= Felipe Benicio Alfau =

Dominican military commander (1818–1878)

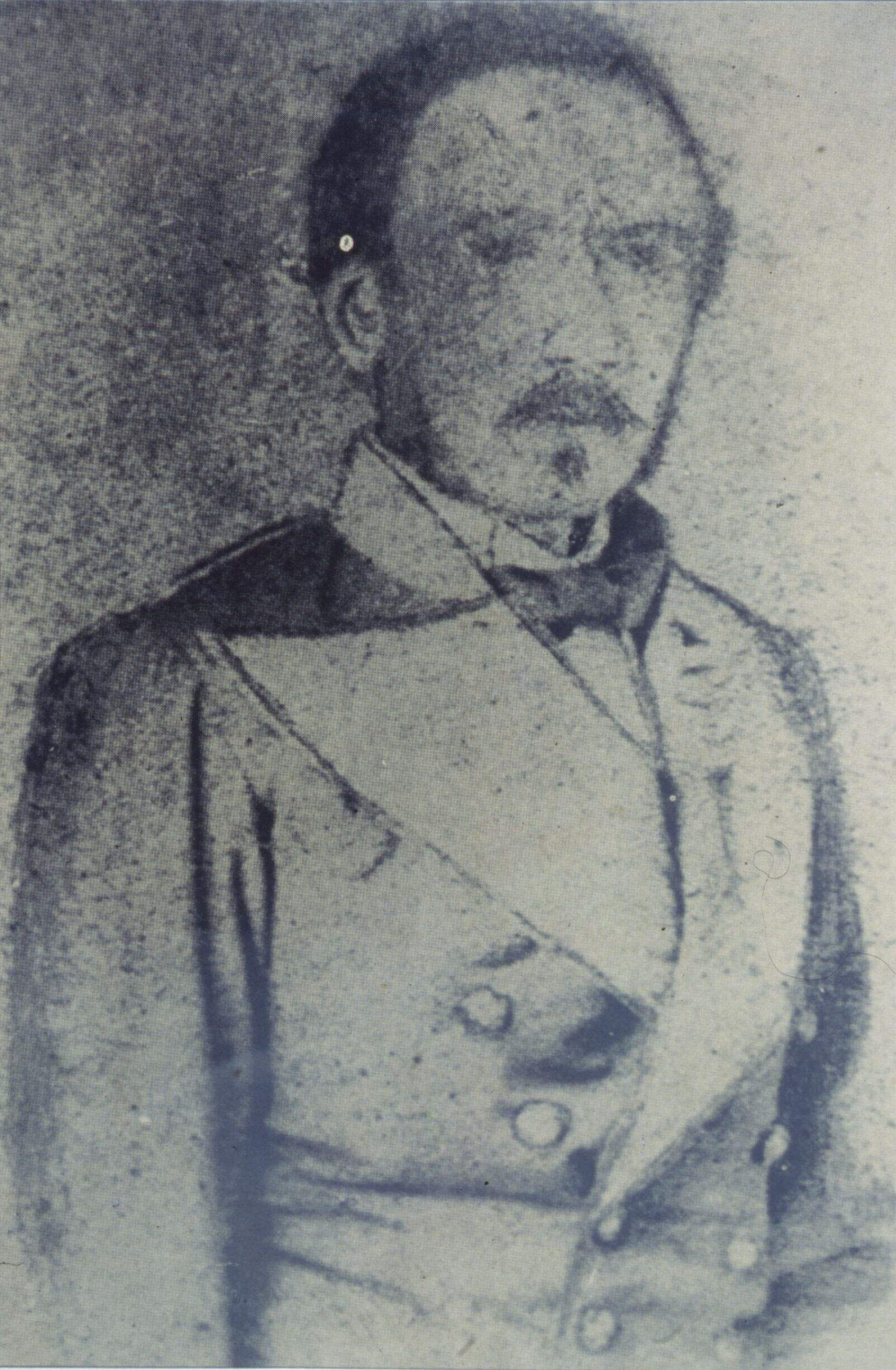
- Born: August 22, 1818; Santo Domingo, Dominican Republic
- Died: October 4, 1878 (aged 60); Seville, Spain
- Citizenship: Dominican and Spanish
- Occupations: Politician, military leader
- Years active: 1844–1878
- Movement: La Trinitaria
- Spouse(s): Maria Josefa Baralt Galván; Maria Elena Lalaurie y Peraza (m. 1873–1878)
- Children: 5; including Felipe Alfau Mendoza
- Parent(s): Maria del Carmen Bustamente López and Julián Alfau Páez
- Relatives: Antonio Abad Alfau (brother); José Antonio Páez (cousin)

Felipe Benicio Alfau y Bustamante (August 22, 1818 – October 4, 1878), better known as Felipe Alfau, was a Dominican military leader, Freemason, Febrerista, politician, and diplomat. He co-founded the secret society La Trinitaria with Juan Pablo Duarte, adopting the pseudonym Simón. A trusted ally of Pedro Santana, he earned the nickname "El Temerario" (The Fearless) from his adversaries, the Baecistas.

Alfau rose to high ranks in the Dominican Army and served as a deputy in 1854, a senator from 1855 to 1857, and governor of Santo Domingo Province in 1847–48 and 1858. As the Dominican Republic's first ambassador to Spain, he negotiated a Spanish protectorate in 1859. After the annexation of the Dominican Republic to Spain in 1861, he was honored by Queen Isabella II with the Order of Isabella the Catholic, the title of gentleman of the chamber, and the rank of field marshal in the Spanish Army. Following the Dominican Restoration War, he settled in mainland Spain with his sons, including Felipe Alfau Mendoza, who became a general in 1908, and his brother, Antonio Abad Alfau. In Spain, he served as military governor of Madrid, La Coruña, Cádiz, and Seville, and was named an Honorary Academician of the Academy of Archaeology and Geography of Madrid. He died in Seville on October 4, 1878, while serving as military governor.

== Origins and family ==
Felipe Benicio Alfau y Bustamante was born on August 22, 1818, in Santo Domingo, to María del Carmen Bustamante López (1798–1835), a Dominican from the same city, and Julián Alfau Páez (1786–1852), a Venezuelan from Guayana, cousin of José Antonio Páez, later President of Venezuela. Julián, son of Joaquín Baldomero Alfau and Ana María Páez y Mendoza, both of Canarian descent, emigrated to the Captaincy General of Santo Domingo in 1804. He married twice: first to María Bustamante in 1815 and later to Rudesinda Sánchez in the 1830s. Julián died in Higüey on May 28, 1852. Two of his sons also died there: Julián, murdered on December 24, 1864, outside the Sanctuary of San Dionisio, and José Joaquín (1837–1881), a senator for El Seibo in 1878. Felipe's brother, Antonio Abad Alfau (1817–1871), was a close companion, and together they were known as "The Alfau brothers." Felipe was baptized on September 2, 1818, at the Church of Santa Bárbara by priest Juan Ruiz.

== Political and military career in Santo Domingo ==
During the Haitian occupation of Santo Domingo, Alfau was conscripted into the Haitian Army under compulsory military service enforced by Haitian governor Jérôme-Maximilien Borgella. In January 1838, he faced trial for assaulting Second Lieutenant Hipólito Tranquil. On July 16, 1838, he co-founded La Trinitaria with Juan Pablo Duarte, Juan Isidro Pérez, Pedro Alejandro Pina, Jacinto de la Concha, Benito González, Juan Nepomuceno Ravelo, Félix María Ruiz and José María Serra de Castro to overthrow Haitian rule. By 1843, Alfau was a member of the Constante Union Lodge No. 8, a Masonic lodge founded in 1822. He aided in hiding Duarte from Haitian authorities in August 1843 and later succeeded him as head and colonel of the Haitian National Guard in Santo Domingo.

In November 1843, Alfau disciplined a soldier, Eugenio Contreras, causing unrest among black troops who opposed his methods. He signed the Manifesto of January 16, 1844, and participated in the February 27, 1844, pronouncement that established the First Dominican Republic. During the Dominican War of Independence, he fought in the Battle of Azua, Battle of El Memiso, and led the Battle of Santiago on April 30, 1844. Promoted to colonel by Pedro Santana on June 2, 1844, he joined Santana’s General Staff.

On July 13, 1844, Santana became Supreme Chief, leading to tensions with the Central Government Board. When Juan Isidro Pérez referenced Marcus Junius Brutus in a dispute, implying a conspiracy against Santana, Alfau protected Pérez from a mob by escorting him to the French consulate.

Promoted to brigadier general on July 23, 1844, Alfau fought in the Battle of Cachimán in December. In 1845, he co-founded the patriotic association Friends of the Country with Manuel María Valencia. He quelled a rebellion in San Cristóbal and defeated Haitian forces alongside Antonio Duvergé at Las Caobas and the Fort of Cachimán. As General in Chief of the Northern Army, he and Francisco Antonio Salcedo repelled Haitian forces at the Battle of Beler in October 1845.

In March 1847, Alfau became a major general and was appointed military governor of Santo Domingo Province. He later served as political governor and Chief Superior of the State High Police. In 1849, he supported Santana’s siege against President Manuel Jimenes. In 1853, he declined the position of Minister of War and Navy, and in 1854, he briefly served as a deputy and was elected vice president but declined the role. From 1855 to 1857, he was a senator for Santo Domingo, opposing a bill granting Santana the use of Saona Island.

In 1856, Alfau led the Northern Army to victory at the Battle of Sabana Larga against Haitian forces under Faustin I. Amid the 1856 crisis involving Buenaventura Báez and Antonio María Segovia, Alfau proposed a reconciliation between Santana and Báez, which was initially accepted but later violated by Báez. During the Cibaeño Revolution in 1857, Alfau sought refuge in a foreign consulate and went into exile in Puerto Rico and Saint Thomas, returning with Santana in 1858. That year, he served as interim political governor of Santo Domingo and ran in the 1859 elections, receiving minimal votes.

== Involvement in the annexation to Spain ==
In May 1859, Alfau was appointed Government Delegate in the Cibao and later became the Dominican Republic’s Extraordinary Envoy and Minister Plenipotentiary to Spain. He negotiated a protectorate with Spanish Minister Saturnino Calderón Collantes, proposing mutual commitments including Spanish military support, fortification of Samaná and Manzanillo, and immigration of Spanish settlers. Spain agreed to provide military aid and instructors but not resources for a Samaná shipyard.

Alfau facilitated the appointment of Antonio Cerezano as Archbishop of Santo Domingo and organized the migration of 305 Spanish settlers between 1860 and 1861, contributing to the establishment of the Dominican Republic’s first military academy and the newspaper El Correo de Santo Domingo. In 1860, he met Queen Isabella II and advocated for annexation, which was formalized on March 18, 1861.

In April 1861, Alfau informed Santana of Haiti’s opposition to the annexation. He was appointed field marshal in September 1861, received the Order of Isabella the Catholic in December, and was named gentleman of the chamber in January 1862. During the Dominican Restoration War, he served as civil and military governor of Santo Domingo until Spanish troops withdrew in July 1865.

== Marriage, offspring, and later years ==
In Spain, Alfau served as military governor of La Coruña (1866–1867), Madrid (1868), Cádiz (1872), and Seville (1873–1878). During the 1868 Glorious Revolution, his son Antonio was injured. Alfau welcomed Queen Isabella II in Seville in 1876.

Alfau married María Josefa Baralt Galván (1825–1908), sister of novelist Manuel de Jesús Galván and academic Rafael María Baralt. In 1873, he married María Elena Lalaurie y Peraza, committing bigamy as his first wife was still alive. He had five children: Cristóbal, Miguel, Antonio, Felipe, and Altagracia.

Alfau died on October 4, 1878, in Seville. His requiem mass was held at the Church of the Sagrario, and he was buried in San Fernando cemetery. In 1891, his remains were likely transferred to a collective ossuary.
