= La Trinitaria (Dominican Republic) =

19th-century secret society in the Dominican Republic

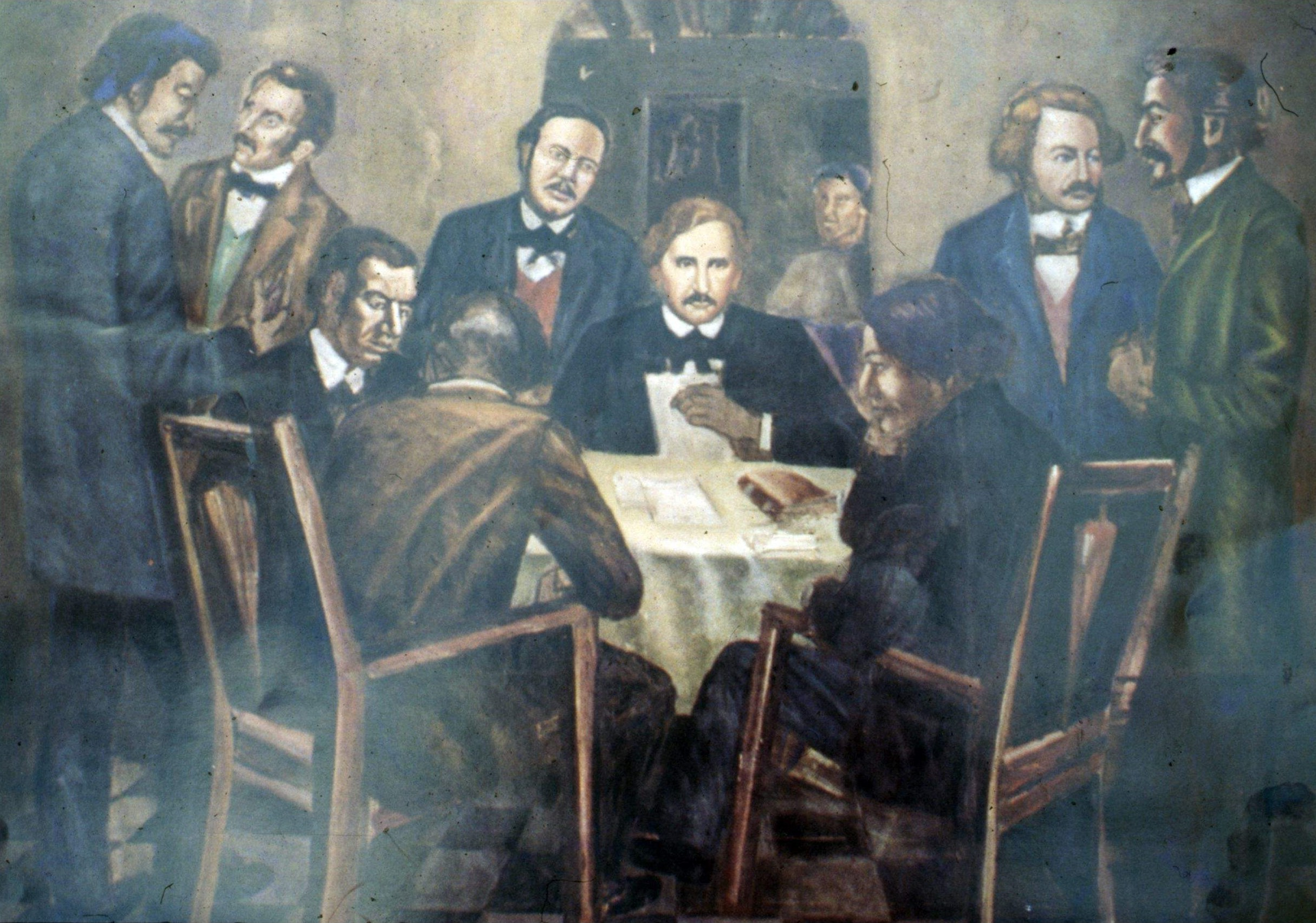
- Meeting between Duarte and the Trinitarios
- Named after: The Trinity
- Formation: July 16, 1838; 188 years ago
- Founder: Juan Pablo Duarte; Juan Isidro Pérez; Pedro Alejandro Pina; Jacinto de la Concha; Félix María Ruiz; José María Serra de Castro; Benito González; Felipe Benicio Alfau; Juan Nepomuceno Ravelo
- Dissolved: August 22, 1844; 182 years ago
- Merger of: La Dramatica; La Filantropica
- Type: Revolutionary movement
- Legal status: Dissolved
- Purpose: Dominican independence Dominican nationalism
- Official language: Spanish
- Leader: Juan Pablo Duarte
- Key people: Juan Pablo Duarte; Francisco del Rosario Sánchez; Matías Ramón Mella

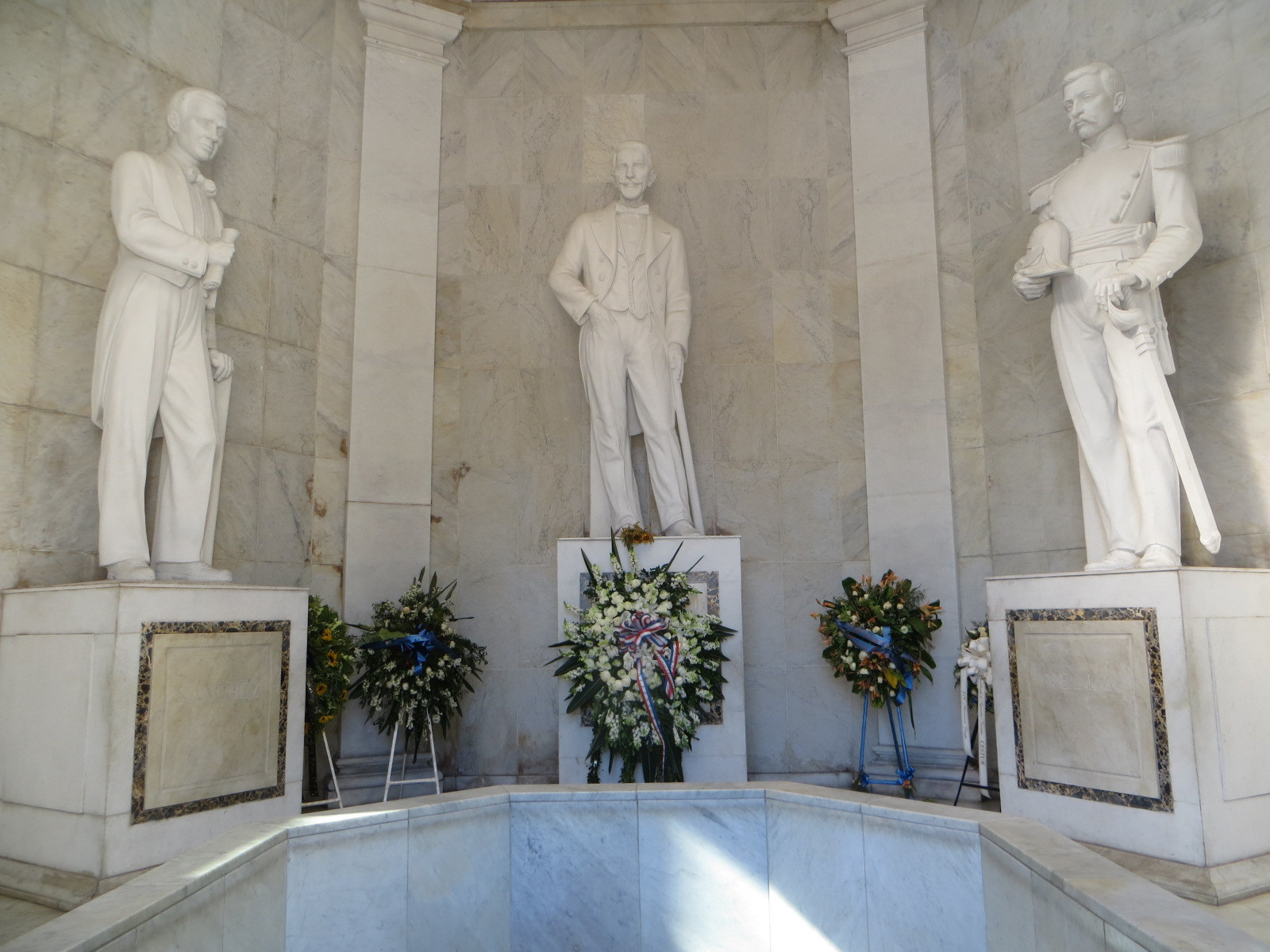
Statues of the three founding fathers. From left to right: Francisco del Rosario Sánchez, Juan Pablo Duarte and Matías Ramón Mella.

La Trinitaria (Spanish: [la tɾiniˈtaɾja], The Trinity) was a secret society founded in 1838 in what today is known as Arzobispo Nouel Street, across from the "Del Carmen's Church" in the then occupied Santo Domingo, the current capital of the Dominican Republic. The founder, Juan Pablo Duarte, and a group of like minded young people, led the struggle to establish the Dominican Republic as a free, sovereign, and independent nation in the 19th century. Their main goal was to protect their newly liberated country from all foreign invasion. They helped bring about the end of the Haitian occupation of Santo Domingo from 1822 to 1844.

Acting in three-person cells and communicating through a complex system of passwords and codes, La Trinitaria focused on a three-pronged message of democracy, representative government, and independence for the Dominican Republic. While they focused on radical ideals, they funneled those ideals through art – members of the group would create intricate theater acts that they would perform anywhere from people's homes in front of a dozen onlookers to the stage of La Carcel Vieja – where hundreds would look on. The performances were created to build communities and establish unity among Dominicans. Woven within the plays would be revolutionary political messaging that would push the agendas of the Trinitarios. These works led to the exile of Duarte in 1843.

== Etymology ==
Basic minimal (equilateral triangular) version of the "Shield of the Trinity" or "Scutum Fidei" diagram of traditional Christian symbolism, with translated English-language captions (in place of original Latin).

The name La Trinitaria was given in honor of the Holy Trinity. The name La Trinitaria alludes to the recruitment method, in which each one had the mission of recruiting three additional members, and these in turn did not reveal the identity of the others. The method used was imported by Duarte, who had spent the previous decade in Europe.

== History ==
In 1821, the once-vibrant economic powerhouse known as the Colony of Santo Domingo began its fight for what is known as the Ephemeral Independence. But unfortunately, the newly independent state lacked support and the leaders were unable to secure a deal with Gran Colombia. By 1822 the newly independent Haitians were fearful that the French would use the eastern portion of the island to mount an attack on Haiti, and re-establish slavery. Under the leadership of Jean Pierre Boyer, the Haitians invaded the eastern side of Hispaniola, outlawed slavery, and unified the island once again. However, conditions under Haitian rule were no better than they had been under the Spanish, and a growing part of the population became dissatisfied with the situation.

A man, Juan Pablo Duarte returned to the country from his studies in the United States and Europe in 1833. After eleven years of domination, the idea of freedom was planted in Duarte by the captain of the ship that took him to the United States, who questioned him about how he felt to be a "slave." At the age of 20, Duarte began the work of independence by sowing ideas of freedom among his friends, to whom he gave free education in his father's hardware store, located on Las Atarazanas Street.

While this was happening, a handwritten sheet called The Spanish Dominican, began to circulate through the city, with messages against the Haitian Government, established in the eastern part of the island in 1822 and directed by the leader Jean Pierre Boyer. The pasquín soon generated interest in the Capital and throughout the country. In response, Boyer circulated La Chicharra, a publication aimed at controlling the rebellion. Although it was anonymous, the pamphlet was written by José María Serra de Castro, who confided his secret to Duarte. Immediately, both joined in the task until one day Duarte encouraged him to deploy more forceful actions.

=== Formation ===
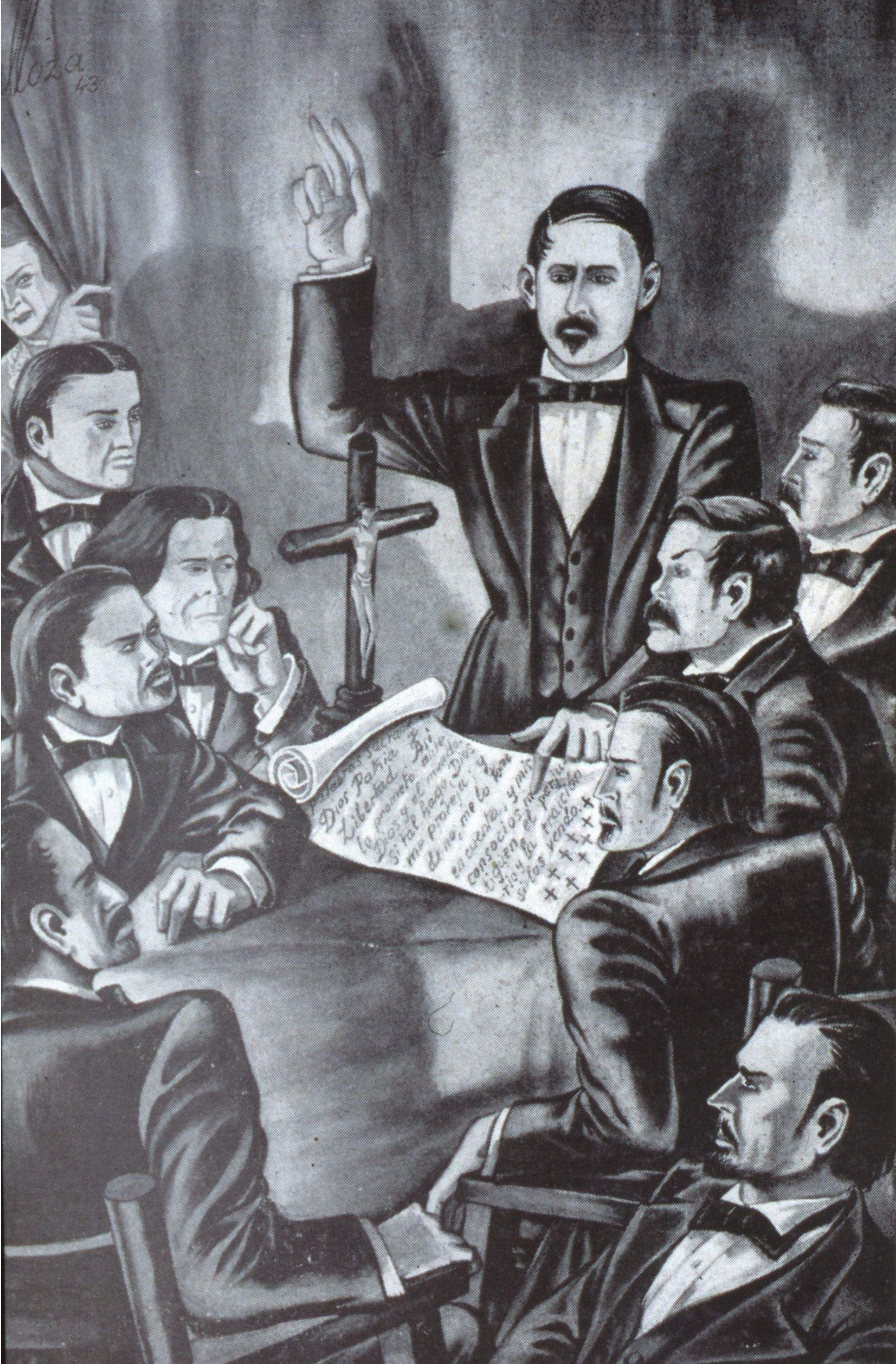
Illustration of the foundation of the Trinitarios by José Alloza.

The foundation of the Trinitarios took place on July 16, 1838, at 11 in the morning, in the city of Santo Domingo, Calle del Arquillo, (which was later called Santo Tomás and is currently Calle Arzobispo Nouel), number 255 in front of the Nuestra Señora del Carmen Church. This was the modest house of Josefa Antonia Pérez (Chepita) and her son, the Juan Isidro Pérez. That day and time was chosen because there would be a crowded procession, and Juan Pablo Duarte considered that it would be more convenient to keep the secret than holding the meeting in a remote place or in the early morning hours.

In that house, he met with eight of his friends and they established the La Trinitaria Secret Society. In that memorable meeting, Duarte told those present:

We are convinced that there is no possible merger between Dominicans and Haitians. We are and will be two different peoples. Our destiny is to be independent, absolutely independent. [...] Our society will be called La Trinitaria because it will be made up of groups of three and we will place it under the protection of the Holy Trinity. Our motto: God, Country and Freedom. [...] My friends, we are here to ratify the purpose that we had conceived of conspiring and making the people rise up against the Haitian power, in order to establish ourselves as a free and independent State with the name of the Dominican Republic. The white cross that will carry our flag will tell the world that the Dominican people, upon entering the life of freedom, proclaim the union of all races through the bonds of civilization and Christianity... The situation in which we will place ourselves will be very serious, and all the more so since once we are already on this path, going back will be impossible. Now, at this moment there is still time to evade commitment. Therefore, if anyone wanted to separate...

At that moment those present interrupted him and confirmed his decision to fight for the proclamation of the Dominican Republic. It was then that Duarte took out of his pocket a document that everyone had to sign with his blood; but before that solemn act, those present took the following oath, written by Duarte himself:

In the name of the Most Holy, Augustinian and Indivisible Trinity of Omnipotent God, I swear and promise, by my honor and my conscience, in the hands of our president Juan Pablo Duarte, to cooperate with my person, life and property to the definitive separation of the Haitian government and to establish a free, sovereign and independent republic from all foreign domination, which will be called the Dominican Republic; which will have a tricolor pavilion in red and blue quarters crossed by a white cross. Meanwhile, we Trinitarians will be recognized with the sacramental words God, Country and Liberty. This is what I promise before God and the world. If I do this, may God protect me, and if not, take it into account; and my fellow members will punish me for perjury and treason if I sell them.

After having said the oath, According to historian Mariano Lebrón Saviñón, to formalize their union, the Trinitarios read the Trinitarian Oath and signed it with their own blood, placing a cross before each person's name. Duarte then said:

The cross is not the sign of suffering; It is the symbol of redemption. The Trinitaria is formed under its aegis, and each of its nine partners is obliged to reconstitute it, as long as one exists, until we fulfill the vow we make to redeem the homeland from the power of the Haitians.

Serra, Ruiz and Ravelo validate their own attendance at that solemn meeting, as do those of Duarte, Pérez and Pedro Alejandro Pina. Ravelo's list is incomplete, as he noted that there had been 12 attendees, of whom he only remembered the names of seven. When Emiliano Tejera interrogated Duarte in Caracas, in 1864, he pointed out that Francisco del Rosario Sánchez and Matías Ramón Mella immediately entered La Trinitaria. Tejera concluded that on July 16 there were two meetings, an inaugural one in the morning and another in the afternoon, in which new members joined. Different sources indicate that at the beginning of La Trinitaria, there were several categories of members. Tejera, with the endorsement of other scholars on the subject, concluded that those attending the morning meeting were: Duarte, Juan Isidro Pérez, Pedro Alejandro Pina, Jacinto de la Concha, Félix María Ruiz, José María Serra, Benito González, Juan Nepomuceno Ravelo and Felipe Alfau. In addition to these nine, the immediate accession of several more is noted, who can also be considered founders of the revolutionary organization: Francisco del Rosario Sánchez, Matías Ramón Mella, Vicente Celestino Duarte, Félix María Del Monte, Juan Nepomuceno Tejera, Tomás de la Concha, Jacinto de la Concha, José Antonio Bonilla, Pedro Carrasco, Epifanio Billini, Joaquín Lluberes, Pedro Pablo de Bonilla, Pedro Antonio Bobea, Juan Evangelista Jiménez, Remigio del Castillo and others.

Each founding member had a pseudonym and an assigned color to protect their identity. Duarte was named president and general of the secret organization, with the power to grant degrees. His close followers received the rank of colonel, and were recognized by a pseudonym and a color. For example, Duarte had blue, which meant glory, Pérez had yellow, a symbol of politics, Pina had red to mean patriotic passion, and Sánchez had green, for hope. Each one had to look for two more who only knew him, so that in case of betrayal only two would be in danger and not all of the conspirators. In addition, they had an alphabet and touch code to communicate.

=== Ideology and teachings ===
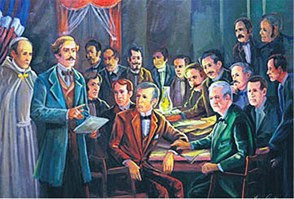
Assembly of the Trinitarios c. 1838

Various documents report on his conception of the ideal order that the nation should achieve. The main source is the draft Constitution that he prepared between the months of April and June 1844, which was left unfinished due to the events that took place. First, it points out that absolute independence constitutes the cardinal law of the nation and the State, and that therefore it is inviolable, regardless of the circumstances. Duarte was opposed to the conservatives, who lacked faith in the ability of Dominicans to make an independent state viable. When events precipitated from the beginning of 1843, almost all conservatives, belonging to the older generations of the upper urban strata, who until then had collaborated with the Haitian rulers, came to the conclusion that the ideal formula to free themselves from the Haitian yoke It was the protectorate of France. For this reason they were disparagingly described as “Frenchified.” In addition to seeing it as impossible to confront Haitian military superiority, they considered that the presence of a foreign power was essential to promote economic progress, since the country was too poor. The most renowned of the Frenchified, Buenaventura Báez, justified his position in favor of the protectorate or the annexation of the country with the principle of cosmopolitanism, that is, that the country was obliged to integrate into the currents of civilization and progress in force in the world. For Duarte, the ideas of the conservatives were nothing more than the expression of an anti-national vocation, and he used the neologism of “orcopolitans”, that is, citizens of hell, to describe the “cosmopolitans” (citizens of the world). Many years later he wrote to his friend, Félix María Del Monte, his thoughts on the matter:

That fraction or rather that faction has been, is and will always be anything but Dominican; This is how it is seen in our history, representative of every anti-national party and therefore a born enemy of all our revolutions.

Duarte maintained his intransigence against the conservative annexationists throughout his life. On one occasion he indicated:

As long as the traitors are not punished, as they should be, the good and true Dominicans will always be victims of their machinations.

Duarte was essentially an anti-colonial fighter, a precursor of Dominican anti-imperialism. Like most citizens he understood the merger had failed. Despite this truism, he affirmed, since the beginning to José María Serra, that he was an admirer of the Haitians, clearly establishing:

I admire the Haitian people from the moment when, going through the pages of their history, I find them desperately fighting against excessively superior powers, and I see how they defeat them and how they emerge from the sad condition of slaves to become a free and independent nation. I recognize him as the possessor of two eminent virtues, the love of freedom and courage; […]

His attitude was contrary to other Creole sectors that advocated returning to Spain, France, Great Britain, and the United States. During the aforementioned conversation, Duarte highlighted how pertinent it was to create an independent republic, not only free from the Haitians, but from all foreign power:

[…] the Dominicans who on so many occasions have gloriously shed their blood, have they done so only to seal the affront that in reward for their sacrifices their dominators grant them the grace of kissing their hands? No more humiliation! No more shame! If the Spanish have their Spanish monarchy, and France has its French monarchy, if even the Haitians have constituted the Haitian Republic, why should the Dominicans be subject, now to France, now to Spain, now to the Haitians themselves, without thinking? in becoming like the others? No, a thousand times! No more domination! Long live the Dominican Republic!”

A second aspect of Duarte's conceptions was his attachment to legality, since he sought to establish a regime based on the norms of institutions, and not on the accidental conveniences of individuals. His draft Constitution contains several sections dedicated to ratifying the obligation to obey the law, both for rulers and the governed. The significance of the centrality that the father of the country assigned to the legality of the state order was that it prevented any hint of dictatorship, the source of which is the violation of the law. Duarte aspired to the construction of a comprehensive democratic order, where the powers of powers and people were delimited, so that there was no impairment of the rights inherent to the dignity of the person. The north of the political system should be respect for freedoms, starting with beliefs. In the draft Constitution, the Catholic religion is enshrined as the “predominant religion in the State,” but without prejudice to “freedom of conscience and tolerance of religions”.

Although it established that sovereignty resided in the nation (the gathering of all Dominicans), it had to be maintained in accordance with a democratic order. Article 20 of the draft Constitution reads: “The Nation is obliged to preserve and protect, through its Delegates and in favor of wise and just laws, the personal, civil and individual freedom, as well as the property and other legitimate rights of all individuals. that compose it.” In another section of the draft Constitution he established: “No power of the earth is unlimited, nor is that of the law.” The democratic conception of the political order was expressed in a complete manner in its proposal that the Dominican State be divided into four powers, and not three as was classical based on the doctrine of Charles de Montesquieu, who had conceived the theory of separation of the three powers as a formula to avoid despotism. In addition to the executive, legislative and judicial powers, the draft Constitution introduced municipal power. That is to say, the municipality began to have a dignity similar to that of the other powers, enjoying full autonomy, a relevant issue since it ensured the exercise of citizen rights. With this centrality of the municipality, Duarte was designing a democracy that guaranteed the participatory exercise of citizen rights and duties.

The above led him to include in the draft Constitution a definition of the type of government:

[…] it must always and before all, be its own and never and never be imposed by foreign forces, whether direct, indirect, proximate or remotely; It is and must always be popular in terms of its origin, elective in terms of the way it is organized, representative in terms of the system, republican in its essence and responsible in terms of its actions.

But he did not limit himself to conceiving his proposal from the mere angle of the political system, but rather connected it with social democracy. From its beginnings, his circle was viewed as a conglomerate of whites who opposed the domination of black Haitians. In fact, many of them participated in the prejudices coming from the colonial past that assigned a status of superiority to whites and a corresponding status of inferiority to blacks. Duarte sopposed these criteria and instilled in his disciples the principle of “race unity.” This meant the recognition that the Dominican nation had been structured through the mixture of diverse ethnic contributions, fundamentally that of Africans and Europeans, to give rise to a particular conglomerate of mulatto majority. This reality was elevated to the category of principle that should guide the association of all the people in a nation of equals, where there were no privileges for reasons of caste or color. (The recruitment of prominent black leaders such as José Joaquin Puello, Eusebio Puello and Gabino Puello further solidified these principles).

The importance assigned to the issue had more than justified reasons, since the main obstacle facing the completion of the formation of the nation lay in the colonial criteria that established inequality between the ethnic-racial components. The concern is observed in one of the poems written by Duarte:

The whites, blacks, mixed, crusaders marching serenely united and daring, let's save the Homeland from vile tyrants, and let us show the world that we are brothers.

The democratic social criterion is developed in a text of his transcribed by his sister Rosa:

Anyone who contradicts in any way the fundamental principles of our political association places himself ipso facto and outside the Law, for the Law would recognize no more nobility than virtue, nor more vileness than vice, nor more aristocracy than that of talent, the aristocracy of blood being forever abolished as contrary to the unity of race, which is one of the fundamental principles of our political association.

Rosa Duarte herself refers that, when the principle of racial unity was fought, her brother proceeded to destroy the draft Constitution.

=== Military training ===
The importance he attached to military tasks is evident in the fact that he joined the National Guard, a Haitian military body composed of civilians, and was gradually rising through the ranks, with the hidden intention of acquiring the training that it understood it should possess to dedicate itself to the necessary tasks that would lead to the definitive separation of the Haitian government. For this, he recommended to his fellow students in the underground that they do the same, which resulted in his appointment as General in Chief of the Liberation Army. It is historical knowledge that La Trinitaria political-military organization because its members were convinced that the task they faced was against seasoned troops who had just defeated a much more prepared French enemy. In turn, Duarte appoints nine colonels, thus becoming this entity the driving force behind all independence activity. Duarte's educational activities began to include shooting and fencing classes, in order to prepare his disciples for war.

Duarte's entry into military life was as a corporal in 1834 for his training in the Haitian National Guard. It is worth referring here to a reflection that the writer Washington de Peña makes on this matter when he suggests: "As it is, he is a corporal of the National Guard, who at the same time is General in Chief of the Army in the formation of a new republic." He reached the rank of captain in 1842 and colonel in 1843, until his appointment was canceled by order of General Charles Rivière-Hérard on June 14 of that same year. Such provision is carried out due to Herard's knowledge of the insurrectionist activities to which the patrician was dedicated.

Precisely, this knowledge occurs after the skirmish that Duarte starred in when in the Plaza de Armas, on January 27. He put himself at the head of attacking forces, without achieving his objective, making a tactical retreat to San Cristóbal, where he acquired new troops, which he unites to his own army. Reorganized and as colonel, second in command of General Desgrottes, he attacks the aforementioned square again, achieving the surrender of it which was commanded by General Bernard-Philippe-Alexis Carrié.

One of the scholars of Duarte's military life, Alfonso Torres Ulloa, referring to Duarte's military skills, does so with the following words:

His vision as a military strategist was demonstrated when he decided to agree to an alliance with the Haitian reformists to overthrow the Boyer's iron dictatorship, since that would allow him to strengthen his positions and weaken the enemy, forcing the division to deepen and then face a weaker enemy. For which he sent Ravelo to Port-au-Prince and when he returned without completing the task, Duarte decided to send Matías Ramón Mella, who managed to reach an agreement with the reformists. And he also demonstrates his gift of command and leadership.

Duarte was posthumously promoted to the rank of General of the Army of the Dominican Republic, by Decree N0. 32–94. (This rank is 4 stars and higher than Lieutenant General.)

A large number of facts and demonstrations of Duarte's strategic military expertise can be recounted. Another example of the founder's military courage - which journalist José Rafael Sosa relates - was when he returned to the country in March 1864, during the Dominican Restoration War, where Duarte shows his intention to join the battles that took place. they carried out, and ends by saying:

If I have returned to my country after so many years of absence, it has been to serve it with soul, life and heart, being that I have always been a reason for love among all true Dominicans, and never a stone of scandal, nor an apple of discord.

=== Theatrical activities ===
By 1840, the Haitian government suspected a possible conspiracy in Santo Domingo, while La Trinitaria grew in followers. Duarte and his followers also founded the societies La Filantrópica and La Dramática, a more visible organization than La Trinitaria, which spread its separatist ideas by staging theatrical events. La Filantrópica, a society of apparent cultural nature, operated under the motto “Peace, union and friendship.” They held public meetings at Pedro Alejandro Pina's home, as literary evenings. Duarte saw how Spain used theatre to raise public sentiment and keep spirits high and as a result, wanted to bring it to the Dominican Republic. The first was “Free Rome” a tragedy in five acts by Antonio Saviñón, and he appeared at a private house with the permission required by the Haitian authorities. At some point the Haitian authorities felt alarmed about one of these works, when “Haiti like Rome” was shouted; However, they decided not to repress the activity because they considered it harmless and that it should even be imitated by young Haitians. The Trinitarios also managed to shake the public by presenting works such as Day of the Year 23 in Cádiz, by the Spanish writer Eugenio de Ochoa. In addition, they presented the drama The Widow of Padilla, by Francisco Martínez de la Rosa, whose staging was quite an event. Several Trinitarios became actors to give life to the characters of the plays, carefully chosen to contribute to the raise awareness about the effects of Haitian domination.

Hoping to increase nationalism, the members of these two groups would rehearse theatre acts in people's homes and perform in front of hundreds in La Carcel Vieja ("The Old Jail", which today houses the Museo de la Catedral). (Enrique Patín Veloz said that Manuel Guerrero, a fervent supporter of Duarte, converted the old prison building into a theater for performances). These performances would help ease tension within the people of the Dominican Republic and it was within these performances that group would push revolutionary agendas. For example, Pérez called for a revolution during one performance and the whole crowd cheered and gave a standing ovation.

=== Revolution against Boyer regime ===
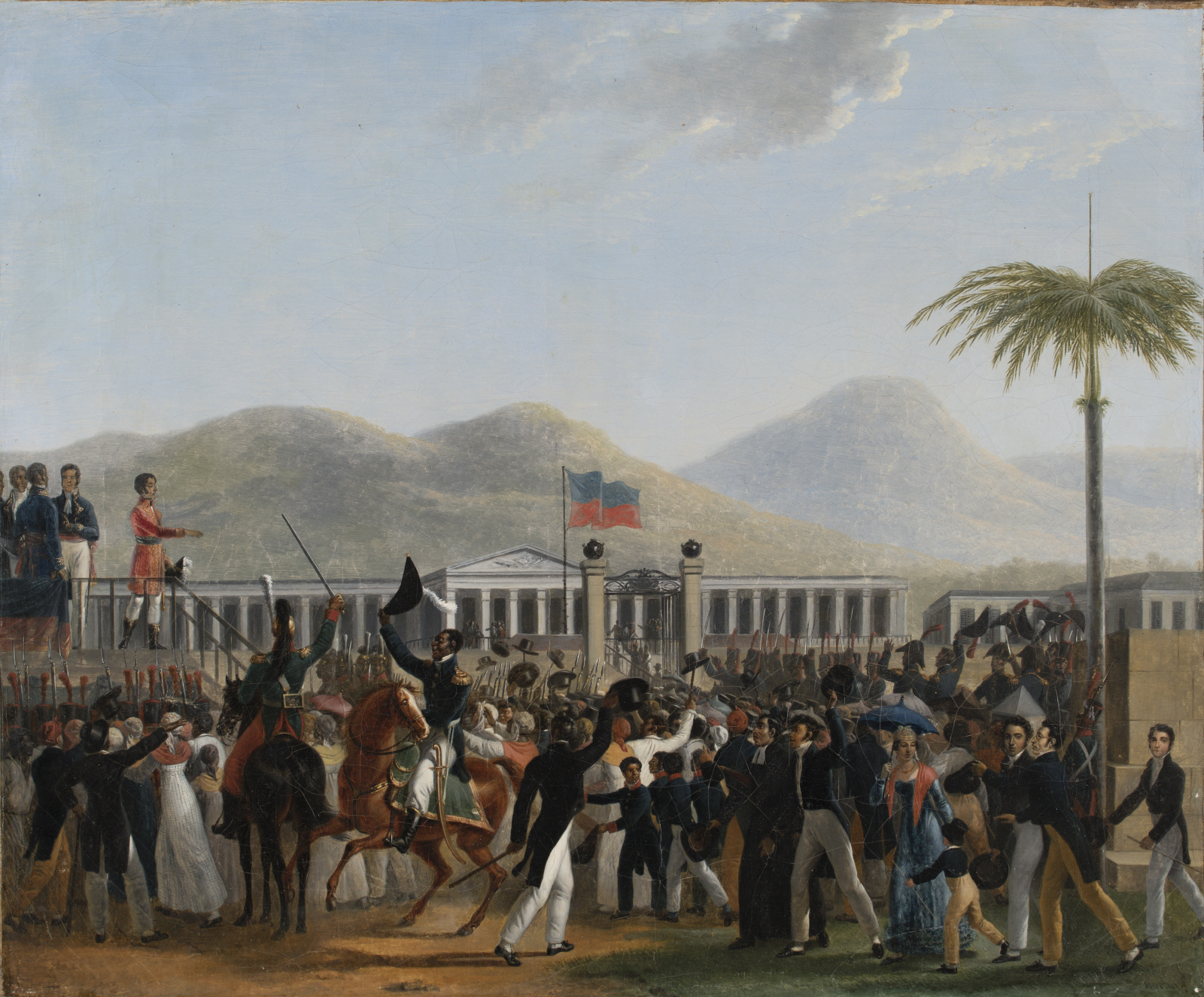
By the end of the 1830s, opposition against the Boyer regime continued to erupt on the island, finally reaching its climate after the 1842 earthquake in Haiti.

After some major fighting in southern Haiti in early 1843, the Reform Revolution crushed all resistance from the forces of the Boyer regime. A provisional government was established in Port-au-Prince under the leadership of the Reformation military leader, Charles Rivière-Hérard. The La Reforma government represented the various sectors that opposed the Boyer regime in recent times but had to respect a large part of the political and military machinery. Upon learning this, Trinitarios send emissaries to Haiti to achieve the combination for the coup. The second emissary, Matías Ramón Mella, managed to make contact and obtain Dominican participation in the revolt.

The fall of Boyer was known in the eastern part of the Island on the afternoon of March 24, 1843 and immediately the different sectors began to mobilize, each one attending to their respective class interests. However, the young people of Trinitaria did not waste time, and under Duarte, as well as by the Haitian anti-boyeristas Adolfo Nouel, and Artidor Gontieux, they headed that same afternoon to the fortress of the city with the purpose of taking it by force. The revolutionaries were detained in the Cathedral Square by Haitian troops, a brief exchange of words between two groups and then a shootout that resulted in two deaths and five injuries. The Trinitarios had to abandon the plaza and take refuge in San Cristóbal, where they pressured the commander of arms to express his support for the revolution. Likewise, they received support from other cities such as Azua, Baní and Santiago. A Popular Junta was installed in Santo Domingo and was in charge of exercising the function of provisional government, and included Duarte and other patriots who had fought alongside the Haitian liberals to overthrow Boyer.

However, the alliance between the Trinitarios and Haitian liberals could not be permanent. Duarte, aware of this, proceeded to take advantage of the situation that was presented to them to make contacts with other young people from the interior of the country in order to achieve independence for the eastern part of the island. The efforts carried out by Duarte were known by the Haitian liberals, who were not willing to give up the eastern part of the island, so they also began to maneuver with the help of other Dominican sectors in order to prevent the materialization of the ideals of the Trinitarios. During that time a series of movements arose but not with independence intentions. Of these, the strongest after that of the Trinitarios, was the one made up of mature men who had collaborated with the Haitians in various administrative positions and who sought to obtain help from France, in exchange for economic and political privileges. The leaders of this movement were the wealthy owner from Azua, Buenaventura Báez, and the bureaucrat Manuel Joaquín del Monte. The group led by Duarte was the only one that did not consider separation, but rather pure independence.

=== Persecution against the Trinitarios ===
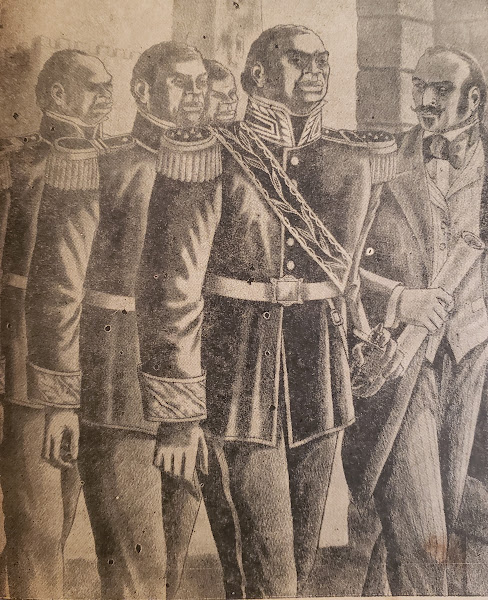
Illustration of General Charles-Rivière Hérard by José Alloza.

The Trinitarios were victims of serious persecution. One of the main centers of conspiracy was the Duarte family home itself. Despite the abuses she received from the dominators, Duarte's sister, Rosa, contributed to the independence work along with a group of friends, who dedicated themselves to manufacturing cartridges for the revolution. In addition, they turned the lead sheets left in Juan José Duarte's warehouse into bullets. Josèfa Antonia Pérez, Ana Valverde, María Trinidad Sánchez, María Baltasara de los Reyes, Concepción Bona, María De Jesús Pina, sacrificed themselves and promoted plots against domination in their homes.

With the fall of the Boyer dictatorship in Haiti, Charles Riviere-Hérard emerged, who moved with his troops to the Capital where he arrived on July 12, 1843. Upon arrival, he stationed his troops in front of the residence of the Duarte family, but Duarte was warned and hidden. On July 14, the Haitians raided Trinitarios in which they arrested Pedro Pablo Bonilla, Juan Nepomuceno Ravelo, Luis Betances, Silvano Pujol, Manuel José Machado, Norberto Linares, Gabriel José Luna, and Narciso Sanchez Ramona, (father of Francisco del Rosario Sánchez), who were immediately sent to Port-au-Prince. Over the next few weeks, Duarte spent from one place to another hiding from the Haitian army in the small citadel that was Santo Domingo because all the houses were guarded and many of Duarte's "traitors," eager to collect a reward, laid in wait for Duarte's whereabouts.

Word spread in the City that the Haitian tyrant offered 3,000 pesos and the colonel's epaulette for Duarte's head. Sánchez, who was also in hiding, fell ill with pneumonia because upon learning of the persecution against Duarte he traveled to look for him in the Capital, and to escape those who were looking for him he spent the night swimming in the Ozama River.

Despite numerous spies and patrols in the streets, Duarte managed to escape. He left for Saint Thomas on August 2, 1843, and from there traveled to Caracas, Venezuela. While there, he dedicated himself to raising funds for the independence cause, holding meetings of Dominicans and Venezuelans at his uncle José Prudencio Díez's house to raise funds. The then president, General Carlos Soublette, despite his promises to help, his words do not materialize and therefore Duarte leaves for Curaçao on December 15, 1843, and from there enter Santo Domingo clandestinely.

=== Preparations for independence ===
Meanwhile, the Trinitarios continued the fight in Duarte's absence. Leadership was transferred to Sánchez, who corresponded with Duarte during the latter's exile in Venezuela, and Mella, who pursued a joint liberal-conservative alliance with the senior politician, Tomás Bobadilla. Thanks to this, on January 16, 1844, the manifesto in favor of independence was released, and the fight for independence began to gain the necessary momentum. On February 24, they held an urgent meeting at Sánchez's house to finalize details of National Independence.

=== Birth of the Dominican Republic ===
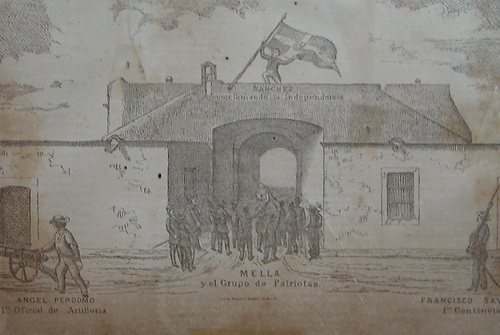
Proclamation of the Dominican Republic at Puerto del Conde on February 27, 1844.

At 10 pm on February 27, the conspirators met at the Puerta de la Misericordia and because there was a smaller group than expected, some began to doubt. But a man, Matías Ramón Mella, fired his blunderbuss into the air, encouraging everyone present. From there they went to the Puerta del Conde where the Declaration of Independence was made and the Central Government Board was installed, chaired by Francisco Del Rosario Sánchez.

At dawn on February 28, the flag that María Concepción Bona and her cousin María De Jesús Pina had embroidered was raised for the first time. On the 29th, at 6 in the morning, the Haitian authorities formally handed over their powers, assets, archives, military equipment and properties. Hundreds of people were celebrating in the streets and had moved to the People's Capital.

In a letter written by the Consul of France in Santo Domingo, Eustache Juchereau de Saint-Denys, to the Minister of Foreign Affairs, François Guizot, on March 3, 1844, he narrates “since then the tranquility has been perfect.”

=== Organizing the Cibao ===
However, the same does not happen with the accounts of the events that occurred during the month of March 1844, in the rest of the incipient nation. Seemingly, the support for the cause of independence was casual and spontaneous, when in reality it is appropriate to specify and highlight the extraordinary proselytizing work carried out by the Trinitarios throughout the national scope, starting in 1838. In Cibao the extensive and successful work carried out by Matías Ramón Mella, achieving the integration of large sectors of the population of this region into the independence movement. (In fact, it was during this action when after the fall of Boyer, he was denounced in Cotuí and was arrested by Haitian authorities, who transferred him as a prisoner to Port-au-Prince, in 1843). These circumstances can be related some aspects of the process of the pronouncements in favor of the cause of Independence, carried out with complete success in the towns of Cibao, which revealed that Duarte's ideal had been deeply and widely embraced throughout the region.

When the Provisional Government was installed on February 28, 1844, one of its first provisions consisted of appointing one of the Trinitarios, Pedro de Mena, as its Delegate to the people of Cibao, with the aim of informing them about the declaration of Independence, and achieving their adhesion to this cause. Mena leaves promptly on March 1 to fulfill his mission in Cotuí, and then in La Vega. The few garrisons that existed there were mostly made up of national guards already committed to the Independence plans, which is why he managed to ensure that the Trinitarios obtained the unanimous support of said populations. Macorís and then Moca, also adhere, without great difficulties, due to the same conditions.

The situation in Santiago, however, was very different from that of other towns. The larger Haitian military force was concentrated there in Cibao, commanded by General Morisset. Its garrison consisted of a company of grenadiers, one of artillery, another of gendarmerie, a fourth of police and the fifth of national guards. Therefore, it was necessary for a special strategy to be formulated to inflict a solid repulsion. On March 4, at nightfall, when the Trinitarios of Santiago, called by Dr. Alejandro Llenas “The Separatists Club,” met at the house of Román Franco Bidó, a messenger sent from La Vega by Pedro de Mena, informing them of their arrival in La Vega and informing them that this town had already spoken out for the cause of Independence. Mena asked them for a meeting in order to prepare Santiago's pronouncement. The main Trinitarios gathered that night included, in addition to Román, his brother Juan Luis Franco Bidó, Domingo Daniel Pichardo Pró, José Desiderio Valverde and his brothers Manuel and Sebastián, Manuel Román and his brothers and Pedro Tapia.

Ezequiel Guerrero, another general who was in Moca, returned early in the morning of March 5 and informed his companions that that town had already spoken out. The group commissions the José Desiderio Valverde to immediately move to La Vega, and coordinate there the strategy that they recommended be adopted. The emissary, upon his arrival in La Vega, explained to Pedro de Mena the difficulties existing in Santiago, and the need to have the support of the independence forces that had already been formed in the other towns mentioned. They quickly execute their action plan. Messengers are sent from La Vega to Macorís, while Mena moves to Moca. On the night of March 5, Macorís' troops join those of Moca and advance along the roads of Tamboril and Don Pedro, commanded by General Francisco Antonio Salcedo and the Delegate of Mena. On the other hand, the troops organized in La Vega, commanded by Colonel Toribio Ramírez and Commander José Durán de Jarabacoa, marched quickly and left for Santiago along the Puñal road. (These troops, who arrived near Santiago, were mainly made up of Dominicans who had been part of the national guard companies who, in turn, came from the military detachments established in the aforementioned towns. These troops are joined by men from the ranches near Santiago, commanded by Bartolome Mejía, Ramón Céspedes, Manuel Jimenes and others).

At dawn on the 6th, an emissary sent by Delegate Pedro de Mena arrived in Santiago, and had communicated with General Morisset, commander of the plaza, informing him of the action initiated with the aim of achieving Santiago's pronouncement, taking advantage of the declaration of Independence. Aware of the seriousness of the situation raised by the emissary of the Delegate of Mena, Morisset immediately gathered the main parents of the community in the Municipality and decided to entrust them with determining the side he should take. Those gathered there decided that the situation should be resolved peacefully, which motivated Morisset to choose to hand over the square to the troops that had already been deployed near the town. Once this decision was made, he also ordered that his troops, which had been sent by him for his defense, located both on the Gurabo road, commanded by Ángel Reyes, and those located in Nibaje, under the command of Mallol, would withdraw to the San Luis Fortress, where the rest of the military garrison was located. The Dominican troops, informed of the decision taken by the Haitian commander, entered Santiago quickly and easily, to the San Luis Fortress, where the Morisset' s forces were already located.

At that moment, the unprecedented and extraordinary spectacle occurred when both groups, hostile and armed, met in the same place in a formal but peaceful manner. In this situation, General Morisset personally proceeded to lower the Haitian flag and “retired as a prisoner of war,” receiving him from Delegate Pedro de Mena who would later have him taken to Santo Domingo. At four in the afternoon on March 6, 1844, “the crossed flag waved for the first time” over Santiago, without a single shot having been fired. The next night, Macorís troops left Santiago, accompanying the Delegate of Mena, with the purpose of achieving the declaration of Puerto Plata for the cause of Independence. With this, Alejandro Llenas affirmed:

Dominican authorities were organized: General Felipe Vásquez, who was previously governor of La Vega, was in charge of the governorship of Santiago. General Imbert was attached to him. Colonel José Gómez and General Francisco Salcedo were sent with forces to Los Hatos (of the Northwest), with the mission of planting the crossed flag on the border.

In these observations, the rapid and well-coordinated movement of patriots, described in this story, was practically duplicated with equal success. This contributed significantly when, twenty-four days later, when there was a new concentration of Dominican forces coming from all over Cibao, the Dominican forces confronted, combated and defeated the invading Haitian troops, this time commanded by General Jean-Louis Pierrot, in the Battle of Santiago.

=== Duarte's return ===
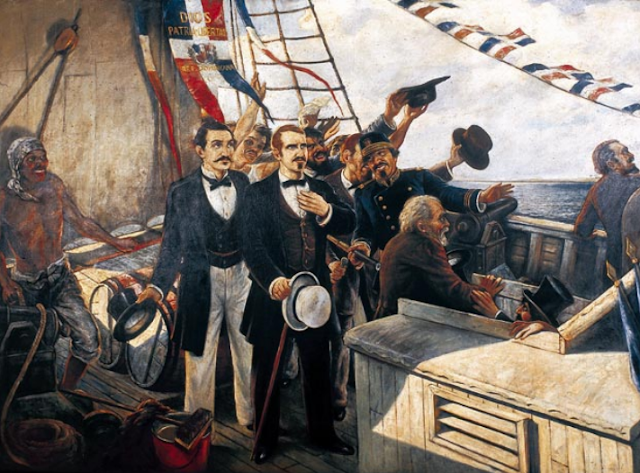
Painting of Duarte's return to his homeland

Duarte arrived in the country on March 15, 1844, from Saint Thomas, where he had contracted malaria. Duarte set foot off the schooner Leonor, a clamor arose of “hosannas” in the crowd that cheered him, and while the cannon of the Fortress fired the ordinance salvo, Archbishop Portes e Infante embraced him and exclaimed: “Hail, Father of the Country!” The crowd followed him with a thunderous clamor to the Plaza de Armas, where he was proclaimed General in Chief of the Armies of the Republic. Upon arriving at the Government Palace, Duarte unsheathed his sword and offered it to the Junta, so that it would be the one to decide the further fate of his activities. The Board promoted him to Brigadier General and he complied with this wish in a clear example of respect for the rule of law.

Following the official ceremony at the Palace, Duarte went home to reunite with his family. The public and the military accompanied him, marking a day of widespread celebration for Duarte, the army, and the Dominican public.

=== Decline ===
The involvement of La Trinitaria is also seen in the early formation of the new republic. Yet for the most part the society's ideology, which was in sync with Duarte's, was not implemented, as Pedro Santana forcibly took the reins of the newly formed nation and exiled Duarte. As a result, Santana enacted re-colonization of the country by Spain, making it the only former colony of the Americas to do so.

== Members of Secret Society La Trinitaria ==
- Juan Pablo Duarte - (1813–1876) was a Spanish-Dominican military leader, writer, activist, and nationalist politician who was the foremost of the founding fathers of the Dominican Republic.
- Matías Ramón Mella - (1816–1864) was a Spanish-Dominican revolutionary, politician, and military general.
- Francisco del Rosario Sánchez - (1817–1861) was an Afro-Dominican politician and revolutionary
- Jacinto de la Concha - (1819–1886) was a Spanish-Dominican revolutionary and politician.
- Felix Maria Ruiz - (1815–1891e) was a Spanish-Dominican politician.
- José María Serra de Castro - (1819–1888) was a Spanish-Dominican revolutionary and hero.
- Benito González - (1811–1883) was a Spanish-Dominican revolutionary and politician.
- Felipe Alfau - (1818–1878) was a Venezuelan-Dominican soldier and politician.
- Juan Nepomuceno Ravelo - (1815–1885) was a Spanish-Dominican revolutionary and colonel.
- Juan Isidro Pérez - (1817–1868) was a Spanish-Dominican revolutionary, politician.
- Pedro Alejandro Pina - (1820–1870) was a Spanish-Dominican military leader and politician.
- Antonio Duvergé - (1807–1855) was a French-Dominican general who is one of the most legendary military figures in the history of the Dominican Republic.
- José Joaquín Puello - (1806–1847) was an Afro-Dominican politician and military commander.
- Eusebio Puello - (1811–1871) was an Afro-Dominican revolutionary and soldier.
- Gabino Puello - (1816–1847) was an Afro-Dominican revolutionary and militant.
- Manuel Jiménes - (1808–1854) was a Spanish-Dominican politician and revolutionary.
- Juan Alejandro Acosta - (1813–1884) was a Spanish-Dominican military commander.

== Other usage ==
Today, La Trinitaria may also refer to the three founding fathers of the Dominican Republic. The usage is a play on words whereby the concept of the Trinity is overlapped with the establishment of one nation by the three founding fathers: Duarte, Sánchez, and Mella.

== See also ==
- Blue Party
- Red Party
- Juan Pablo Duarte
- Dominican War of Independence
- Dominican Restoration War
- Six Years' War

== Bibliography ==
- Rodman Selden, Quisqueya: A History of the Dominican Republic (1964).
- Wiarda, Howard J, The Dominican Republic: Nation in Transition (1969).
- Bell, Ian, The Dominican Republic (1981).
- Wiarda, Howard J, Kryzanek, M. J, The Dominican Republic: A Caribbean Crucible (1982).

=== Additional Bibliography ===
- Henríquez Ureña, Max. La ideal de los trinitarios. Madrid, Spain: EDISOL, 1951.
- Machado Báez, Manuel Arturo. La Trinitaria. Trujillo, Peru: Impresa Dominicana, 1956.
