= José María Serra de Castro =

Dominican political activist (1819–1888)

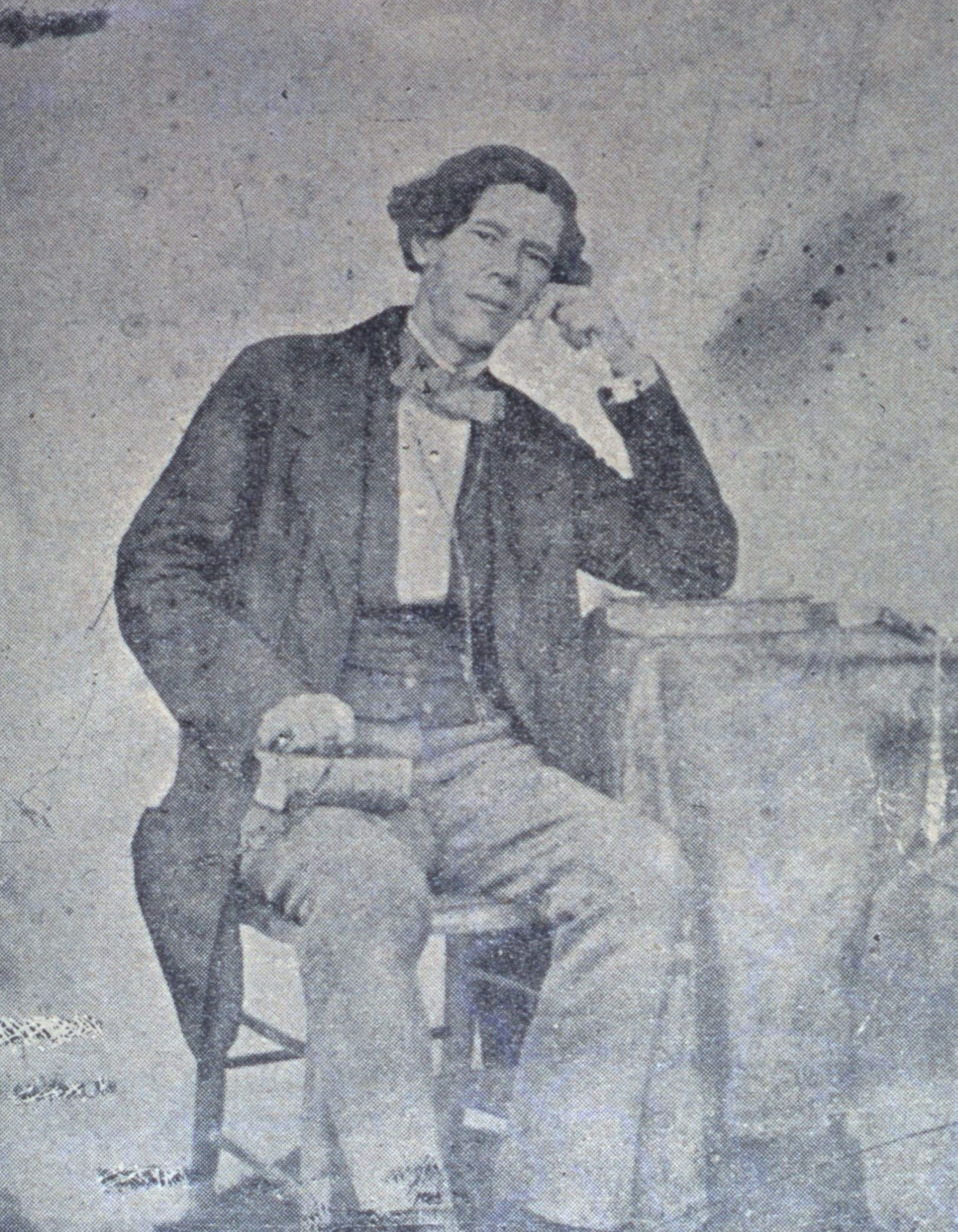
- Born: 1819; Santo Domingo, Captaincy General of Santo Domingo
- Died: August 9, 1888 (aged 69); Mayagüez, Captaincy General of Puerto Rico
- Known for: Co-founder of La Trinitaria

José María Serra de Castro (1819 – August 9, 1888) was a leader of the Dominican War of Independence. He was one of the nine founding members of the secret political-military society called La Trinitaria, and was also a pioneer of Dominican journalism.

== Biography ==
He was born in 1819 in the city of Santo Domingo.

Together with Juan Isidro Pérez, Remigio Castillo, Pedro Antonio Bobea, Felix María del Monte, Rosa Duarte and other Trinitarians, he participated in the theatrical works of the La Filantrópica Society that were presented in the Old Jail building, located next to the Borgellá Palace, in front of Colón Park, with the purpose of raising public awareness about the Dominican independence cause and also obtaining financial resources that allowed them to finance the purchase of ammunition and cover the expenses of their activities in favor of independence.

On February 27, 1844, in the company of his fellow Trinitarians, he participated in the proclamation of the First Dominican Republic.

Shortly after the proclamation of independence, he founded the newspaper El Dominicano with the aim of promoting patriotic ideals, always remaining attached to the Trinitarian ideal.

In 1848, he got along with the administration of Manuel Jimenes, so when he was overthrown in 1849, instituting the regime of Buenaventura Báez, he was considered a follower of the deposed president, causing him unfortunate sorrows that motivated him to leave his country, moving to Saint Thomas and from there to Puerto Rico, where he established his permanent residence, working as a journalist and teacher.

In 1887, he gave his notes on a brief history of the secret independence organization to which he belonged to the priest and politician Fernando Arturo de Meriño, in order for them to be published. This document has allowed considerable historical information relating to the formation of La Trinitaria to become known.

== Death ==
He died in Mayagüez, Puerto Rico on August 9, 1888. In 1915, through efforts made by the Colombian Academic Society, his remains were repatriated to the Dominican Republic.
