= Pedro Alejandro Pina =

Dominican independence leader (1820–1870)

Pedro Alejandrino Pina
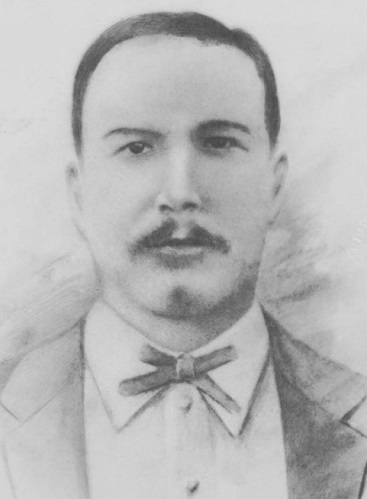
- Portrait of Piña c. 1840s
- Born: Pedro Alejandrino Pina Garcia; November 20, 1820; Santo Domingo, Colony of Santo Domingo
- Died: August 24, 1870 (aged 49); Las Matas de Farfán, Dominican Republic
- Resting place: National Pantheon of the Dominican Republic
- Citizenship: Dominican; Venezuelan
- Occupations: Revolutionary leader, politician
- Years active: 1838–1870
- Political party: Blue Party
- Movement: La Trinitaria
- Spouse: Mercedes Echevarria 1840 ()
- Children: 8
- Awards: National hero

Pedro Alejandrino Pina García (November 20, 1820 – August 24, 1870) was a Dominican politician and military man considered one of the heroes of Dominican independence. He was the co-founder of the Secret Society La Trinitaria and first cousin of the father of Dominican history, Jose Gabriel García and the Dominican activist Concepción Bona.

== Early years ==
Pedro Alejandrino Pina was born in Santo Domingo on November 20, 1820, a year before the declaration of independence led by José Núñez de Cáceres, so his youth passed during the Haitian occupation, which began in February 1822.

As was common, his parents, located in an incipient urban middle class, decided not to leave the country, aware of the disappointments experienced by those who had left in the waves of emigration. His father, Juan Pina, was a small merchant, a grocery store, who had his business in the vicinity of Puerta del Conde, at that time a rather marginal area within the walled city. Juan Pina's offspring, in two marriages, were numerous and some of the hero's brothers were outstanding people. This was the case of Calixto María Pina, who took up a priestly career and became provisional governor of the Archdiocese. Within the Pina family the national ideal and the rejection of Haitian domination were bubbling. (Juan Pina was one of the signatories of the Manifesto of January 16, 1844, which called for the separation of Haiti. And it was in the home of the Pina family where Concepción Bona made the first Dominican flag in January 1844, for which she had the help of María Jesús Pina, Pedro's sister).

In that environment, Pina harbored opposition to Haitian rule since he was a child, in which it is possible that he mixed ethnic motives with national consciousness. This feeling of rejection was evident when he provoked a confrontation against his Haitian classmates, which earned him sanctions and resulted in an insurmountable resentment between both groups. The family environment explains why Pina became a precocious patriot, with concepts defined from his early youth. He was noted for his proficiency in philosophy studies. His entry into the core of young intellectuals who fostered the national ideal was the product of an exceptional cultural development for the time. He distinguished himself at school for his high performance and for consecutive years obtained the medal of merit awarded to the best student on campus. His training was perfected by the private lessons he received from Auguste Brouat, a cultured Haitian resident in Santo Domingo, who developed a beneficial educational action.

In those same years, Pina decided to join the priestly state, a destination that was common due to the difficult circumstances in which the country developed. As there was no seminary, he received training from the Peruvian priest Gaspar Hernández, who in those years led a circle of philosophical scholars, among whose members were several of the young people who would soon undertake conspiratorial actions against foreign oppression. Gaspar Hernández had a conservative stance and preached the return to Spanish sovereignty. But, for the most part, the disciples do not seem to have been influenced by such a position, perhaps because they received the counterweight of other positions that was in favor of an independent State. Historian José Gabriel García, who knew Pina, highlights, in the biography he dedicated to him, "the impetuous character that distinguished him then, and the revolutionary ideas that from the morning of his life were bubbling in his ardent imagination, soon divorced him from the Church." García adds that his renunciation of the priesthood led him to study law, which was also done personally, with an already established lawyer. He also describes his decision to marry Micaela Rosón in 1840, when he was 20 years old.

== Independence activist ==
=== Joining the Trinitarios and La Reforma ===
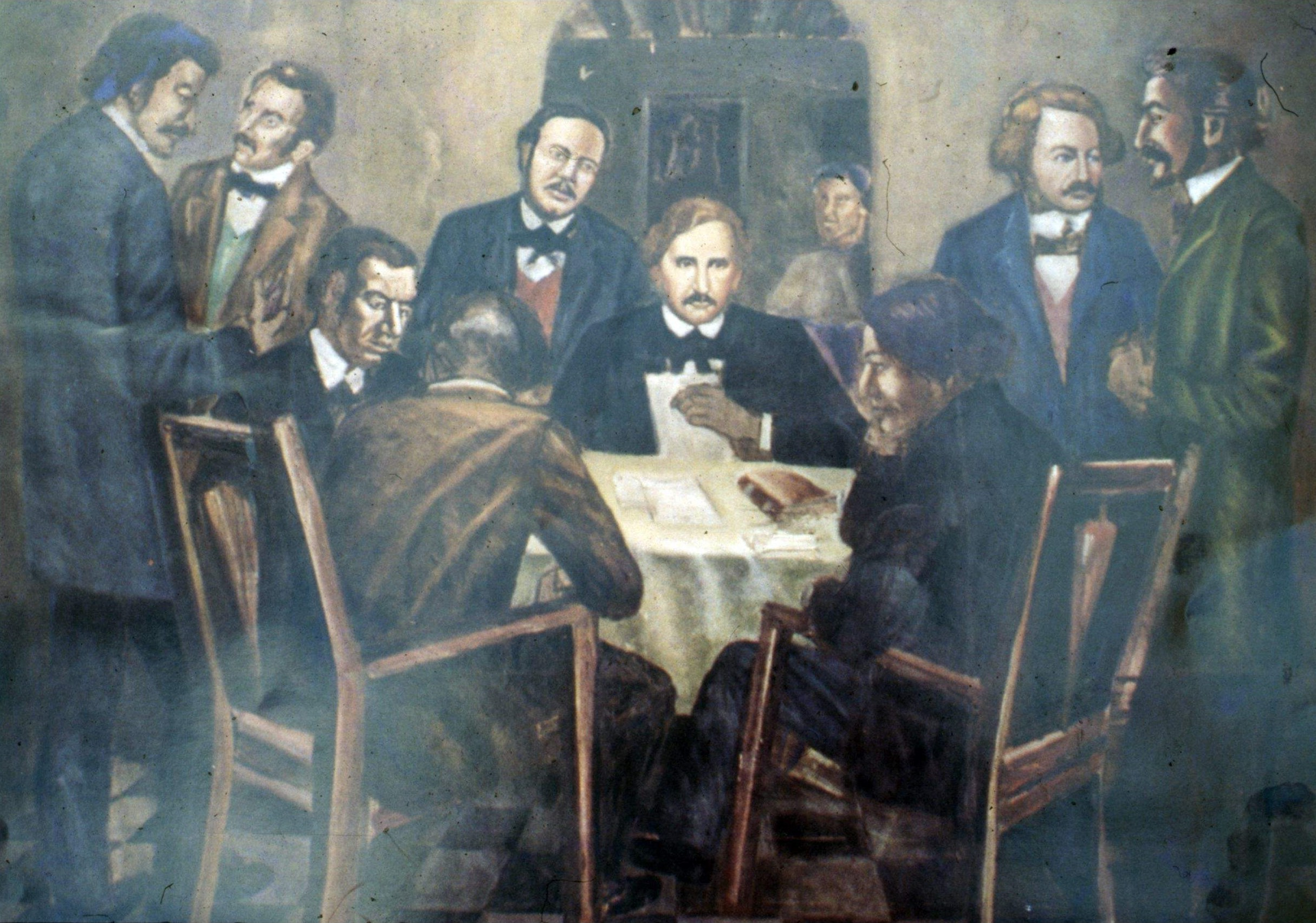
Assembly of the Trinitarios

By the 1830s the deterioration of the Haitian regime was realized, and some disaffected sectors began to pursue a cause for the complete independence of Santo Domingo. One such case was the emergence of a revolutionary secret society called La Trinitaria, on July 16, 1838. Non-consistent versions have been offered about this event, but they can be assumed. stated some facts. That day several conspirators signed an oath to be faithful to the independence cause and the leadership of its leader, Juan Pablo Duarte. They were all young people from the middle and upper urban sectors, a position that gave them access to the liberal doctrines that justified the national cause. Within that conglomerate, Pina was the youngest, at eighteen years old. And far from being an impediment to taking a leading part in the events, youth operated as an incentive to action. The historian García, well aware of the details of the events of those days, relates for example that the recruitment of Francisco del Rosario Sánchez to La Trinitaria was a product of Pina's efforts. Such provision was highlighted on the occasion of the beginning of the processes that led to the proclamation of national independence. Following the fall of the Haitian dictator Jean Pierre Boyer, an uprising occurred in the city of Santo Domingo on March 24, 1843. Duarte's followers gathered that day in the small square of the Carmen church, in front of where almost five years earlier they had founded La Trinitaria. From there they began a march towards the headquarters of the governor's office, demanding the deposition of the incumbent, Bernard-Philippe-Alexis Carrié. They were joined by the Haitian liberals residing in the city of Santo Domingo, led by Alcius Ponthieux, who apparently had links with the Haitian liberal opposition sector originating in the city of Les Cayes. The "reformists", both Dominicans and Haitians, sought the appointment as governor of Commander Etienne Desgrottes, from the liberal sector, in order to extend the Reform process.

The protest was attacked by government troops, resulting in several deaths. The protesters had to leave the city in the direction of San Cristóbal, where they prepared an offensive that forced Governor Carrié to abdicate. A provisional committee was installed composed of three Dominicans and two Haitians. One of its members was Pina who, at the age of 22, jumped to the center of political life. But the most interesting thing was that he became the main tribune of the Dominican sector and acquired fame for his oratory eloquence. Along with the young Pina, his leader and friend, Juan Pablo Duarte, and another Trinitario, Manuel Jiménes, who would also have important performances in the subsequent months and years, were part of the Popular Board, elected by a Popular Assembly on March 30.

From the beginning of the sessions of the Popular Board, in which Pina served as secretary and Ponthieux as president, the national status of the Dominicans was raised. This caused confrontation between the Dominican liberals and the Haitians. Thanks to his oratory skills, Pina took the lead in the organization's sessions, in defense of the national rights of Dominicans. He directed his arguments against those of Jean Baptiste Morin, the other Haitian who belonged to the organization. After one of the exchanges of disagreements, Auguste Brouat concluded that everything was lost for Haiti, since the breakup of the Dominicans was looming closer.

=== Persecution and exile ===
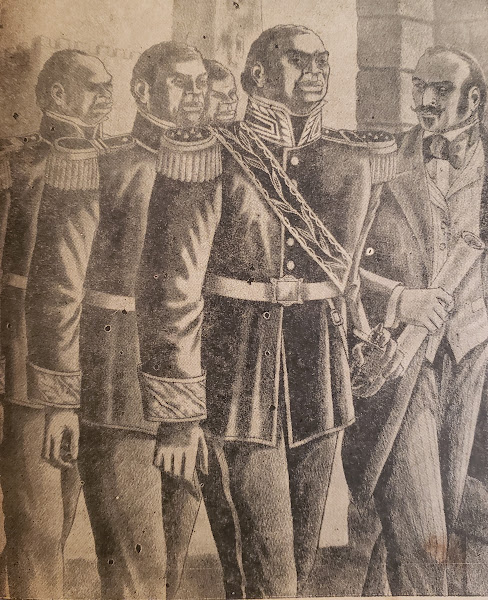
Hérard, upon learning of the actions of the Trinitarios, issued a mass persecution against the independence activists.

The Trinitarios, who now controlled the Popular Junta, promoted the issuance of a document that stated national demands aimed at the autonomy of the Dominican conglomerate and respect for its cultural customs. Faced with these signs, Haitian President Charles Rivière-Hérard, who had led the Reform movement, decided to quell the dissent of the "Spanish boys". At the head of 10,000 soldiers, he entered Dominican territory through the northern part, proceeding to arrest all those suspected of harboring independence purposes. The Trinitarios tried to resist Hérard's entry into Santo Domingo, but, on July 11, 1843, the eve of his arrival, they had no choice but to hide. Pina was one of the most persecuted but, unlike the majority, he managed to evade the search of the Haitian soldiers. However, he had to leave the country, together with Duarte and another of the Trinitarios, Juan Isidro Pérez, because he considered that it was unfeasible to remain hidden for any longer.

The stay of Duarte, Pina and Pérez abroad for more than six months consolidated an endearing sense of brotherhood between the three. Duarte and his sister Rosa would take care of Pina's second daughter, Amelia, in exile. Three months after leaving the country, Pina's third child and first son was born, whom she gave the name Juan Pablo. In September 1843, less than three weeks after arriving in Venezuela and waiting for the start of events, Duarte decided to send Pina and Pérez to Curaçao, from where he hoped they would be able to maintain fluid communications with Santo Domingo, being that small island. one of the two links of the country's foreign trade. They were accompanied by Prudencio Diez, Duarte's uncle, and José Patín, another Dominican resident in Venezuela. Unfortunately, Pina and Pérez could not do anything, since Duarte did not obtain the support of the Venezuelan president, causing him to head to Curaçao.

Duarte and his two comrades, accompanied by a few other Dominicans, planned to secretly enter the country through Guayacanes to start the insurrection, as highlighted in a letter sent to them by Francisco del Rosario Sánchez and Vicente Celestino Duarte. These plans could not come to fruition, so Sánchez decided to follow another course to overthrow the Haitian regime: he established an agreement with a conservative sector led by Tomás Bobadilla. On February 27, 1844, the founding of the First Dominican Republic was proclaimed and a Central Government Board was installed, whose presidency was delegated a few hours later to Bobadilla.

== First Republic ==
=== Return to the Dominican Republic ===
At the beginning there was no controversy between the Trinitarios and the conservatives, although they had strongly divergent criteria about the components of the State that was going to be founded. One of the first measures adopted by the Central Government Board was to commission Juan Nepomuceno Ravelo to go look for Duarte and his companions in Curaçao, on the schooner Leonora. When he arrived at the port on March 15, Duarte was hailed as the Father of the Nation by Archbishop Tomás de Portes e Infante. However, the differences did not take long to surface after his arrival, as Duarte showed hostility towards any media coverage of independence, as was contemplated in the secret negotiations that Dominican conservatives had held with the consul general of France, Auguste Levasseur, while they participated as deputies in the Constituent Assembly of 1843. Duarte led a process of questioning the conservatives' plans, for which he had the support of most of his old friends from La Trinitaria.

On March 22, a week after his return, Pina was assigned to serve as an aide to General Pedro Santana, stationed in Baní as commander of the Southern Expeditionary Front after the Battle of Azua. He stayed at Santana's side longer than Duarte and, unlike Duarte, it does not seem that he had any disagreements with his superior. Rather, Santana appreciated Commander Pina's military skills and came to consider him essential in the campaign.

=== Political dissent and second exile ===
At the end of May 1844, Pina returned with his battalion to Santo Domingo, where he took part in the protest led by Duarte, aimed at preventing the transfer of the Samaná Peninsula to France, in accordance with what was previously stipulated in the Levasseur Plan. The French Consul in the city, who exerted his influence in favor of the conservatives, identified Pina as one of the most hostile to the anti-national plan. On July 9, 1844, Duarte launched a military coup. This led to the deposition of the conservatives of the Central Government Board, considering that freedom was in danger. Pina and Juan Isidro Pérez were integrated into the new board chaired by Sánchez, replacing the expelled conservatives.

When Santana, one of the most conspicuous conservatives, was sure that there was no immediate military risk coming from the Haitians, he decided to march on Santo Domingo and depose the Central Government Board. The city's military chief, General José Joaquín Puello, who a month earlier had led the overthrow of Bobadilla and his conservative friends, opted for surrender, fearing the consequences of civil war. Due to such an outcome, Duarte's proclamation of the presidency, which took place in those days in Santiago and Puerto Plata, did not have much effect in the capital city. The Trinitarios were defeated and the Government Board reorganized in mid-July, this time chaired by Santana, deciding to deport Duarte and those who had supported him for life, on the charge of treason. Pina, Sánchez and Pérez were arrested shortly after the southern troops entered the city. Santana made the gesture of offering Pina a special deal, perhaps out of calculation or because of the eventual appreciation he may have taken of her while they were together in Baní. Through an emissary he sent the proposal to the prison that he disapproved of the proclamation that Matías Ramón Mella had made for Duarte to claim the presidency of the Dominican Republic, in exchange for his release. In an edition of the newspaper El Telefono, dated February 27, 1891, a version of what Pina responded was recorded: "You tell General Santana that I prefer not only exile, but death itself, rather than denying the man that I recognize as leader of the Separation."

Pina was expatriated with Sánchez, heading to England. The ship was wrecked off the coast of Ireland. From there he immediately went to Venezuela, where he spent his second exile, this time until 1848. In the city of Coro, where he established his residence, he worked as a teacher and ventured into commercial activities.

=== Return to the Dominican Republic and third exile ===
When President Manuel Jiménes, who succeeded Santana, issued an amnesty law on September 26, 1848, Pina took the road back the next day after receiving the news, a sign that he kept the fighting spirit alive. Upon arriving in the country, Jiménes, his old companion from the Popular Junta of 1843, granted him the rank of colonel, with a seat in the Secretary of War and Navy. Unfortunately, Jiménes fell as a result of the plot hatched by Santana's supporters after defeating the attempted invasion of Haitian President Faustin Soulouque, Pina decided to leave the country because he assumed that the old dispute with Santana, once again master of the situation, could lead to reprisals. Venezuela continued to be the constant point of reference when Pina realized that he could not be in his land. Hence, he made the nearby South American country his second homeland and adopted its citizenship during his third exile.

Pina's absence from political life in those years was a product of her decision not to compromise with the enemies of democratic ideals. The liberals who entered politics under Santana had to make concessions, as is known from the careers of Francisco del Rosario Sánchez and Matías Ramón Mella. In that third exile, according to what biographers indicate, Pina made the decision to completely withdraw from Dominican affairs, considering that the conditions did not exist for a political practice attached to democratic principles. He did not take advantage of an amnesty from Santana in 1853. Pina's isolation is quite reminiscent of the position of his two companions from the first emigration, Duarte and Pérez, although unlike the first, he was apparently always ready to return to the Dominican Republic. For him, exile represented an existence full of bitterness, always with attention focused on the homeland. Fond of composing poetry, the main theme was nostalgia. This is how "My Homeland" concludes:

There is no pleasure for me. There in the Homeland Beautiful is the sun and beautiful the stars, Sweet is the voice of the bird that sings, Soft is the breeze that kisses the flowers: There in my Homeland is the pleasure of the soul!

== Activism against Spain ==
Despite the isolation, during his third exile, the longest, Pina followed the development of events in the Dominican Republic. When the news arrived of the annexation to Spain carried out by General Santana on March 18, 1861, Pina instantly abandoned his reluctance to participate politically. He understood that the fate of the Dominican people as a national collective was at stake. He contacted his old companion, Francisco del Rosario Sánchez, who from Saint Thomas, led a revolutionary committee that intended to open hostilities as soon as possible against the new foreign dominators.

For Pina, it didn't concern him that most of the members of that opposition group were made up of supporters of Buenaventura Báez. He reasoned that these Baecistas were also opposed to the implementation of Spanish rule, which is why it was necessary to collaborate with them, since it was a problem of life or death for the country. It is likely that Pina considered that Sánchez continued to be a reliable patriot, despite the concessions of the previous years to Santana and his subsequent location within the Baecista current. Furthermore, it can be stated that in that group there were not only followers of Báez. The manifesto issued by Sánchez in the company of José María Cabral left no doubt that the objective pursued was to restore independence without any restrictions.

In the company of other exiles in Venezuela, Pina headed towards Haiti, where Sánchez had managed to obtain the cooperation of Haitian President Fabre Geffrard, who feared that the consolidation of the Spanish presence in Dominican Republic would have negative repercussions on Haiti. Pina was one of the hundreds of Dominicans who made up the expeditionary force that entered through the southern border divided into three columns, commanded by Sánchez through Neiba, in the center, José María Cabral on the left flank, through the San Juan, and Fernando Tavera on the right, for the Neiba Valley. He was part, with the rank of brigadier general granted to him by Sánchez, of the column commanded by Cabral, which came to occupy the town of Las Matas de Farfán. Dozens of Haitian volunteers accompanied the Dominican patriots.

In that position came the news that President Geffrard had been forced to withdraw support for the Dominican insurgents, due to the threat of a Spanish squadron to subject Port-au-Prince to bombing. Cabral, as a seasoned soldier, chose to withdraw, certain that the expeditionary enterprise was doomed to failure, but he made the inconsistency of not giving prior notice to Sánchez. In such dramatic circumstances, Pina decided to go to Sánchez's position to warn him of what was happening. A small group of companions supported him in the risky mission. Sánchez, after Pina's warning, was also forced to withdraw, but was the victim of the betrayal of one of his collaborators, a native of the place. Pina managed to escape the ambush, thanks to the fact that Timoteo Ogando, then captain, knowledgeable about the area and already seasoned in the arts of war, quickly mounted him on the haunch of his horse. With patriotic plans frustrated and apparently postponed with no foreseeable restart date, it was natural for Pina to return to Coro, Venezuela, where he had been living without interruption for the previous 13 years. The Federal War was being fought in Venezuela and, now a citizen of that country, Pina became involved in the fight on the federalist side, in which the supporters of democratic positions were grouped.

When the Dominican Restoration War began in mid-1863, Pina was initially willing to join the fight, but was prevented by both his commitment to the Venezuelan cause and his deteriorating health. He corresponded with Duarte, who had returned to public life after several decades of reclusiveness, and decided to organize an expedition in the company of other patriots, but he could not accompany him.

== Final years ==
=== Joining the Blue Party ===
As soon as news was received in Venezuela that the Spanish troops had abandoned Dominican territory, in July 1865, without thinking twice, Pina returned to Santo Domingo. The Federal War had ended and he was presented with the possibility of returning to his hometown, and not in a war scenario that was unmanageable for his health. As soon as he arrived in the Dominican capital, he placed himself at the disposal of President José María Cabral, his expeditionary companion in 1861.

In Haiti and during the days of the June 1861 expedition, Pina and Cabral had established a friendly relationship. As a sign of trust, high positions were entrusted to Pina. On October 1, he was appointed governor of the province of Santo Domingo, and three weeks later Secretary of State for the Interior and Police. In this position he lasted a few days, since he did not accept Cabral's position of bowing to the Baecista mutiny. However, Pina was integrated into the Constituent Assembly, which continued to function despite the political change, until a new constitutional text was promulgated on November 14, 1865. Pina's participation in this conclave will be seen below.

Initially, the relations between Báez and Cabral remained good, and the former tried to gain the support of those who had fought the annexation to Spain, Pina had no difficulty in accepting the position of judge of the Supreme Court of Justice. Months during which he stayed away from political affairs, he showed signs of distrust towards Báez. As soon as the red leader was overthrown in April 1866 by the concerted action of the leaders of the Restoration War, Pina joined the new order of things. In his second government, Cabral gave even more importance to Pina than in that of months before. The restorative president appreciated Pina's intellectual capacity and her personal consistency. It is likely that the closeness of Pina with Cabral contributed to defining the features of that administration. Cabral appointed Pina as special advisor to the president, a position from which he began to have an impact on the country's affairs. Then he entrusted him with important missions, such as being part of a commission before the Haitian Government for the signing of a treaty of friendship, in the company of Ulises Francisco Espaillat, Juan Ramón Fiallo and the now 80 year old politician, Tomás Bobadilla. The delegation could not achieve its mission, as President Geffrard was overthrown days after his arrival in Port-au-Prince. After the mission in Haiti, he was appointed special commissioner in the province of Azua, an important position because the government was aware that the Haitian Government, chaired by Sylvain Salnave, was preparing to support the aspirations of Buenaventura Báez. In the southern border regions, Pina sought to recover portions of Dominican territory occupied by Haitian authorities and regularize border trade.

=== Constitution Assembly of 1865 ===
As has been noted, at the end of Cabral's first government, which began in August 1865, a Constituent Assembly was convened, which at the same time served as the Legislative Branch, with the objective of giving the Dominican Republic a legal order in accordance with liberal theory. The restorative military leaders and intellectuals in favor of a democratic system understood that they had to leave behind the constitutional tradition that guaranteed a despotic order. That Constituent Assembly was one of the milestones in the visualization of the difficulties that hindered the establishment of democracy. (The only precedent for such an intention had been the Constituent Assembly of Moca, which promulgated the charter of 1858, but which had no lasting effects).

One of the problems that the restorative constituents addressed was to elucidate why the liberal statements of the previous constitutional texts had not had effective application, since they were convinced that the reality of an authoritarian system that granted exaggerated powers to the president of the Dominican Republic. Pina was one of the deputies who distinguished themselves in the debates. He put his intellectual capacity into play to identify problems and derive viable solutions. His weight in the debates led him to be among the drafters of the constitutional text. He systematized the proposals he formulated in the Assembly in a series of four articles titled "Constitution", published in the September 1865 editions of the newspaper El Patriota. His first concern was that the constitutional text adopt provisions to guarantee that the president was a person recognized for his patriotism and honorable background. This emphasis was motivated by the awareness that, even if authoritarianism was eliminated, its figure had a decisive influence on the progress of public affairs. Additionally, he proposed that the necessary criteria had to be established to avoid any abuse of power by the Executive, in such a way that it would be compelled to apply a liberal policy. The starting point of his constitutionalist reflection was that it was imperative to combine a strong executive, in accordance with the conditions of a backward country, with a legal system that guarantees freedoms:

Limiting by law the action of the Executive to the extent possible so that its action in the government of the country is not restricted, making it powerless to curtail the rights of citizens and harm nationality, are things that the Constituent Assembly can, If you want, get it very easily. No more extraordinary powers for the Executive: this weapon that the people grant it in good faith in order to free society from an imminent danger, to ensure public order when tendencies are manifested that are intended to alter it, is such a dangerous weapon, that before they sheath it, they almost always turn it against the person who generously offered it to them so that they could further strengthen the means of action that they could use. That is why the powers of the Executive must always be the same: the limited exercise of power must reside in the Nation, because only it is sovereign.

This search for a weak executive, while capable in its exercise, had the essential purpose of combining governability with freedom. Hence, Pina proposed legislation to make it impossible for authority to exceed the terms of its mandate, that is, to stipulate the abuse of power as a crime and to elevate freedom to the status of a constitutional mandate. Surely because he understood the difficulties that this entailed, he looked for the gaps through which, in Dominican conditions, such a balance between freedom and authority could be feasible. Pina applied his experiences in Venezuelan political affairs, where the nerve of the debate had centered around the powers of the central government and state governments. Possibly because of his Venezuelan experience, he found in the principle of decentralization the key to the ideal political system, since instances would be created for the exercise of citizens' rights and the reduction of the powers of the central government:

If there is no doubt that freedom can fit into all government systems, if it is unquestionable that it does not exist only in the Democratic-Republican system, there is also no doubt that it is the system that comes closest to decentralization, a principle that was introduced moderately in the legislation. homeland, will lead us little by little to the exercise of true popular sovereignty.

With this postulate, he transcended the level of reflection in which the Dominican liberals had moved until then, consisting only of cutting the powers of the Executive. He sought an order that would ensure the functioning of the political system supported by a weak executive. The main antecedent of such a concern had been expressed by Pedro Francisco Bono in the Moca Constituent Assembly, where he unsuccessfully proposed the adoption of the federal system. It is still strange that Pina did not advocate federalism, given his Venezuelan experience, perhaps because he considered that the country was very small and its inhabitants were characterized by common cultural traits. In his opinion, for the local order to be a link in the democratic order, the supremacy of the military element had to be overcome, which put citizens at the mercy of the departmental leaders. The remedy to such tradition was found in a variation in the type of territorial organization. He proposed the adoption of departments, instead of provinces, subdividing them into districts, parishes and sections. All these levels would be subject to the authority of civil officials: respectively, civil governor, prefect, sub-prefect and mayor. He reasoned that it would be achieved:

... the principle of authority, which democratic institutions make reside in the civil element [...] [is not transferred] to that which represents force in society. Subordinated as it should always be to it, it must provide help in the few cases in which it is necessary to adopt rigorous measures to repress excesses that tend to alter order and disturb tranquility, but never exercise any other powers than those assigned to it. grant the ordinances of their institute, powers that at the head of the departments could be exercised by a Square Commander, in the districts by a Sergeant Major and so on.

In the same order, he advocated for a Legislative Branch composed of two chambers with a large number of members, in such a way that the representation of the people was guaranteed to the extent possible. He opposed the previous constitutional system, which rested on a small number of legislators. With two chambers and a large number of members, Congress became a factor in the balance of powers. "Composed of more individuals and represented by two jointly responsible bodies, it is easier for it to impose on the Executive, when unfortunately it deviates from the true path outlined by the laws, to fall into abuse or dictatorship." A direct representation of all populations and a "double discussion on questions of transcendental importance that are submitted to them" would be possible.

Interested in covering all departments of the State, he also reflected on the characteristics of the Judicial Branch. The basic proposal that he stated, based on the experience of the previous 20 years, was based on a simpler institutional structure than the one established in 1844 and that, consequently, would allow a more fluid application of justice. Able to appreciate the contours of the Dominican reality, he argued the need to create a peculiar judicial system, different from the French one, which had been taken as a model, although maintaining a basic analogy. He confirmed that, in fact, the country had been unable in its republican years to institute the judicial organization contained in the French codes of the Restoration, and established two causes for the relevance of a reform: "the shortage of men on the one hand and the poverty of our treasure for another." He summarized his reform proposal in that appellate and superior jurisdiction would be exercised by a supreme court composed of a president, four magistrates and a prosecutor, who would be appointed by the Senate from shortlists proposed by the Chamber of Deputies. The Supreme Court should have the power to apply civil and criminal laws, and its members would appoint first instance judges, so that the judicial system would become independent of the other two powers.

Finally, for an effective exercise of sovereignty by the people, which was the nerve of his concern, he returned to Duarte's idea of adding a fourth power to the already conventional tripartite division: the municipal power. With a greater number of powers, a balance would be achieved between instances of the State that would avoid authoritarianism. In his interventions in the sessions of the Constituent Assembly he expanded on some aspects of the social content that should be guaranteed by the Fundamental Charter. In keeping with the liberal tradition, the nodal point had to lie in the interrelation between freedom and legal equality: "In order for it to make its beneficial influence felt in all classes of society, it is essential that it rest on the most complete equality, on the most broad individual freedom." Such a conjugation would give rise to the set of rights essential for the development of the ideal political system, starting because it would guarantee freedoms and rights, such as the inviolability of life for political reasons:

Life, a precious gift that only nature can grant us, is forever guaranteed to those who commit crimes in political matters, since the death penalty established in the codes for those crimes is abolished; The laws that imposed exile for the same reasons have been repealed: property is as sacred and inviolable as the domestic home; the expression of thought, free, and also the right to petition; positive that of association and that of suffrage; Individual security is guaranteed, because no one is reduced to prison except by their competent judge and by virtue of pre-existing laws, and finally citizens are equal before the law ...

Despite being a disciple of Duarte, Pina does not seem to have been concerned with the issue of social democracy. In his texts on constitutional matters he accepted liberal theory without problematizing it. His consideration of democracy was reduced to the political sphere, excluding the social sphere. It can be assumed that he shared the dominant conclusion of Dominican liberalism, which was nothing more than advocating the establishment of a bourgeois society, seen as an irreplaceable model for access to civilized modernity. Although he did not express it exhaustively, in the glossed texts there are indications to consider that Pina shared the corollary that an adequate political order would open the doors to the solution of social problems. This can be confirmed, to some extent at least, because his disquisitions on the principle of equality focused on the treatment of the rights of foreigners. Pina accepted the common sense of everyone, liberals and conservatives, who gave crucial weight to immigration so that the country could integrate into the current of progress.

If the country needs to get up, arms that promote agriculture, if it needs industries, if it misses the absence of capital, it must be agreed that to obtain the goods it wants, it needs to offer positive advantages to those who often without consultation, they abandon the place of their affections [...] in pursuit of often illusory benefits.

Therefore, he declared himself in favor of continuing to grant guarantees to foreigners, without requiring them to fulfill the obligations that Dominicans had to offer in the service of the State. This approach was made despite his consideration that any protection or system of monopoly for the benefit of a sector, in contrast to the doctrine of free trade, "always harms the very interests that they wish to promote and ends up annihilating the vitality of any country."

== Annexation to the United States ==
The position of the Cabral government was extremely precarious. The country was in ruins and little could be done in a plan of constructive action. Even more important was that the bulk of the Restoration generals, like men from rural areas, did not understand the liberal postulates and began to align themselves behind Báez, the old idol of quite a few of them. In the final months of 1867, the leaders of the northwest took up arms against the Cabral administration and gained ground with the support of the peasant majority, who did not understand or accept liberal principles. In the interest of obtaining resources to confront the sedition of the Baecista leaders, Cabral was willing to accept a proposal from the United States government, formulated on the occasion of the visit of the son of the Secretary of State, William H. Seward Jr, consisting of leasing the Samaná Peninsula for several decades. At that time Pina held the position of deputy, and continued to be a person of the president's greatest confidence. Taking advantage of his position, he advised that no negotiations be carried out that would threaten the integrity of the national territory. Although Cabral did not accept the objection, Pina decided to remain by his side out of a sense of loyalty.

A prominent official of the regime who fell in January 1868, Pina embarked into exile with the president and his collaborators. The blue leaders had to spend a quarantine on an islet near the coast of Venezuela, because when they left the city of Santo Domingo there was a cholera epidemic. During that fifth exile he remained in Venezuela for a year. (It seemed that Pina's destiny was going to have as an inevitable counterpoint that of eternal exile in his second homeland). However, on this occasion he was more involved than before with the progress of the Dominican political processes because, as can be inferred, he considered that a group capable of waging the fight for national independence and democracy had appeared. There are no signs that in 1868 he intended to settle stably in Venezuela, and it can be assumed that he remained attentive to the reorganization of the blues in exile, in order to join the fight in Dominican territory as soon as possible. At the beginning of 1869, some blue leaders from the south, among whom the brothers Andrés, Benito and Timoteo Ogando stood out, prepared the conditions so that former president Cabral could enter Dominican territory from Haiti. In the neighboring country, the exiles of the Blue Party collaborated with the Haitian liberals, led by Nissage Saget, who were trying to overthrow President Salnave. Since she learned of the preparations of her co-religionists, Pina headed towards Haiti and, in December 1868, he arrived at Jacmel, one of the enclaves of Saget's supporters where the Dominicans congregated. Perhaps involved in conspiratorial activity, he did not last long in Haitian territory, but spent months moving between Saint Thomas and Curaçao. When Cabral's position was consolidated in the border regions – in the second half of 1869 – Pina decided to join the armed struggle against the enemies of Báez's Red Party.

He crossed the border in December 1869 and settled first in San Juan de la Maguana. Their determination to take up arms again must have been reinforced by the fact that in those days a treaty was concluded between the governments of the United States and the Dominican Republic through which the latter would become a territory of the "great democracy of the north". From the blue bastion in the southwest, Pina took part in the third national contest after independence. The terrible struggle between reds and blues was colored by the contrast between those who believed in a national destiny and those who rejected such a postulate in favor of access to the prosperity that colonialism provided.

=== Illness and death ===
Although Pina was 49 years old when he joined the fight against the annexation to the United States, he was a man who suffered from serious health problems, which enhances his character as a patriot inclined to action in all areas. The living conditions of the blue combatants were extremely difficult, to the point that even food was scarce and health services were non-existent. The revolutionary politicians established in San Juan de la Maguana and Las Matas de Farfán depended on eventual shipments of small sums of money sent to them by family or friends. The peasant population in the area, apart from being small, was characterized by its extreme state of misery. Cabral's rectitude minimized the exactions of the insurgents on the peaceful ones. Due to his precarious health conditions, Pina could not go to the scene of the fighting, but had to limit his contribution to political tasks. Even in the rear, life was permanently in danger, due to the raids carried out by the murderous gangs of the Baecista regime. He remained in Las Matas, headquarters of the revolutionary movement, where the simile of a national government was created.

The correspondence he had with his son Juan Pablo Pina, also incorporated into the armed struggle, shows that, although he felt like a supporter of Cabral, in reality he had no major interest in the disputes that the former president staged with other prominent men for hegemony. within the liberal conglomerate. He simply wanted to fight again, armed with the conviction that the fate of the country was in danger. Given the fragile conditions in which Cabral's forces operated, Pina could not prevent his health from worsening. A sudden aggravation of the disease had devastating effects and he died on September 20, 1870. He had been in that uncertain battle for freedom for 10 months. Even his death was precocious, as he was not yet 50 years old. He lacked material goods and only had the gift of unreserved dedication left. Oblivious to the calculations of personal convenience of professional politicians, his mystique could not give way. Perhaps he did not even consider that he had received the glory of belonging to the select circle of the architects of the national status of the Dominicans.

== See also ==
- Juan Pablo Duarte
- José María Cabral
- Tomás Bobadilla
