= Joséfa Antonia Pérez =

Dominican activist (1788–1855)

Joséfa Antonia Pérez (March 2, 1788 – July 20, 1855) was a Dominican activist and militant. An independence activist, her actions contributed to the fight during the Dominican War of Independence. She is also referred by her nickname Chepita.

== Biography ==
Doña Joséfa Antonia Pérez was born in Santo Domingo on March 2, 1788, the daughter of a lawyer, Juan Isidro Pérez de la Paz Godíñez, and Francisca Valerio. On November 27, 1805, she married Antonio Beer, captain of grenadiers, from Poland, and they had twelve children.

Her home was used to found the secret society La Trinitaria. One of her sons, Juan Isidro Pérez, was one of the society's founding members, along with Juan Pablo Duarte and Pedro Alejandro Piña.

Doña Chepita, as she was called, watched the streets to distract the Haitian authorities and thus prevent them from noticing the meeting held by the Trinitarios. She assumed the risks that such collaboration entailed.

Doña Chepita died on July 20, 1855, in Santo Domingo.

== See also ==
- Manuela Díez Jiménez
- Juan Pablo Duarte
- María Baltasara de los Reyes

== Sources ==
- Josefa Pérez de la Paz, la valerosa mujer que prestó su casa para fundar la Trinitaria
- Biografias Dominicanas
- Las mujeres febreristas
