= Jacinto de la Concha =

Dominican activist and militant (1819–1886)

Jacinto de la Concha (1819–1886) was one of the early leaders in the Dominican independence movement. He was among the nine founding members of the Trinitarios. However, his popularity waned after his alignment to administrations that favored annexation. Today in the Dominican Republic, he is considered a national hero of the independence struggle of 1844.

== Early years ==
He was born in the city of Santo Domingo in 1819. He was a member of the Secret Society La Trinitaria and the heroes of February 27, 1844. He was an important member of the Dominican national army.

== Activities ==
During the first months of 1849, he served as Tribune and when the liberal government entrusted him with the Ministry of Finance, he participated in the fight to defend the square, besieged by Pedro Santana, after the victory of the Battle of Las Carreras, and when the government of Manuel Jimenes fell, he was exiled.

Some time after returning to his homeland, he became entangled in the revolutionary conspiracy that brought Pedro Eugenio Pelletier to the brink of death in 1855, but the plans did not turn out as Jacinto wanted, so he had to go into exile.

After President Manuel de Regla Mota protected him, granting him amnesty, in 1856, and upon returning to the country, he gave a different direction to his public life, since in the then First Dominican Republic, things did not turn out as the Trinitarios dreamed, with a just homeland for all, therefore Jacinto was a crueler person and more distant from the social problems of the time.

When the Revolution of 1857 took place, he was appointed Commander of Arms of Baní, but shortly after, he was deposed from command and the insurgents captured him, taking him to the city of Santiago; after the revolt he remained in the service of the Government.

Perhaps it is somewhat ironic to know that Jacinto de la Concha was one of those who embraced the cause of annexation to Spain, but that was the case, since the change of regime was very pleasing to him, so he had to fight against the people. From the San Luis Fortress in Santiago, he witnessed the bloody and painful retreat of the Spanish Army to Puerto Plata, but when the Spanish withdrew from Dominican territory, Jacinto joined the Republic.

When Buenaventura Báez regained power, Jacinto de la Concha found his political center of gravity in the leader. He was appointed by Báez as Government Delegate in the Cibao, being a companion of Manuel Rodríguez Objío. When Báez's government was overthrown, he stepped aside, but when Báez came to power again in 1868, he was appointed to another political position, this time as senator and consultant to the senate.

== Death ==
In 1878, there was no other favorable opportunity for Jacinto. Some time later he was decorated as "Professor of the Republic." He died in the city of Santo Domingo in 1886.

== See also ==
- Juan Isidro Pérez
- Manuel Jimenes
- Pedro Santana
