= Félix María Ruiz =

Dominican independence activist (1815–1891)

Felix Maria Ruiz (1815 – October 17, 1891) was a Dominican activist and revolutionary. He was, along with Juan Pablo Duarte, one of the founders of the secret society La Trinitaria, on July 16, 1838, established in the house of Juan Isidro Pérez, located in front of the Church of Carmen.

== Biography ==
Born in Santo Domingo in 1815, from a very young age he received a careful education based on the classics of universal literature, and where there was room for long hours of reading in the family library, which he often shared with his friend and childhood companion Juan Pablo Duarte.

As time passed, the childhood friends met, mature and with greater intellectual background, and above all, Duarte, with very clear political ideals regarding his homeland. Shortly thereafter, the two friends and other young men decided to form La Trinitaria, with the immediate goal of liberating their homeland from Haitian rule.

The Trinitarios was the most important instrument in the independence struggle. After the proclamation of independence, in which Ruiz took part, he participated as a militant for Trinitarian interests in the plans to bring Duarte to the presidency of the new Republic, which was prevented by conservative forces in June 1844.

After six years of struggle, they achieved their goal on February 27, 1844. However, after the initial celebrations, the landowner Pedro Santana and his private army seized power, imprisoned the young Trinitarians, tried them as traitors, and deported them abroad on various ships. Thus began a long exile for Ruiz and his Trinitarian companions.

It wasn't just his homeland he lost; his most beloved possessions remained behind: his family, wife, and three children. After wandering through several countries, he ended up in the Venezuelan state of Mérida, where he settled, worked in various jobs, and married for the second time.

From 1889, he received a pension from the Dominican state, in recognition of his patriotic work.

He settled permanently in Venezuela, but remained faithful to the Duarte ideals. Aged and ill, he died in Venezuela on October 17, 1891. His remains were later transferred to the Dominican Republic, where they rested in the Chapel of the Immortals, from where they were taken to the National Pantheon of the Dominican Republic.

== See also ==
- La Trinitaria
- Juan Pablo Duarte
