= José Antonio Jimenes Domínguez =

José Antonio Jimenes Domínguez (1887 in Cabo Haitiano – 1938) was a Dominican Republic judge and president of the Supreme Court. He was son of president Juan Isidro Jimenes and founder of the "Boletín Mercantil" newspaper.
