= Juan Isidro Jimenes =

President of the Dominican Republic (1899–1902; 1914–1916)

Mr. President Juan Isidro Jimenes
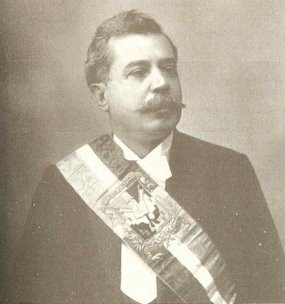

28th President of the Dominican Republic
- In office November 15, 1899 – May 2, 1902
- Vice President: Horacio Vásquez
- Preceded by: Horacio Vásquez
- Succeeded by: Horacio Vásquez

33rd President of the Dominican Republic
- In office December 5, 1914 – May 7, 1916
- Preceded by: Ramón Báez
- Succeeded by: Council of Secretaries of State

Personal details
- Born: November 15, 1846 Santo Domingo
- Died: May 9, 1919 (aged 72) Santo Domingo
- Party: Blue Party
- Spouse: María Josefa de los Santos Domínguez Gómez
- Relations: Juan Isidro Jimenes Grullón (grandson); Domingo Moreno Jimenes (great-grandson); Guillermo Moreno García (great-great-great-grandson)
- Children: 7: José Manuel, Ana Rosa, José Antonio, Carmen Josefa, María Consuelo, María Altagracia & María Dolores Jimenez Domínguez
- Parent(s): Manuel Jimenes González (father); Altagracia Pereyra Pérez (mother)

Juan Isidro Jimenes Pereyra (November 15, 1846 – May 9, 1919) was a Dominican Republic political figure. He served as the president of the Dominican Republic between 15 November 1899 and 2 May 1902, and again between 5 December 1914 and 7 May 1916.

Jimenes was one of the main leaders of the Los Bolos, Blue party or Jimenistas, opposed to the Los Coludos or Horacistas, led by Horacio Vásquez.

He was married to Josefa de los Santos Domínguez. Los Santos spoke French and read poetry and spiritual books.

He is buried in the Catedral de Santa María la Menor.

== Early life ==
He was born on November 15, 1846 in Santo Domingo. He belonged to a family of the Dominican financial oligarchy; his father was Manuel Jiménes, second president of the Dominican Republic, and Altagracia Pereyra.

He settled at an early age in Monte Cristi, where he devoted himself to commerce and made a considerable fortune. His business house had branches in the main ports of the country and in some European cities.

== Early political career ==
He entered politics in 1873, when he went to the mountains to fight against Buenaventura Báez in the Six Years' War. Committed to the liberals, his open opposition to the regime of President Ulises Heureaux led him to exile and to undertake an attempt at an armed invasion of the country in 1872.

He became an expatriate and settled in France, returning to Santo Domingo after the murder of Heureaux in 1899.

== First presidential term ==
His reputation as a financier helped him to become president with the support of the military who had taken part in the conspiracy against the previous president. They appointed General Horacio Vásquez as vice president. He was implicated in the murder of Heureaux and Jimenes had a tense relationship with him. The opposition between the two polarized the political life of the country, which was divided between Jimenistas and Horacistas (also called bolos and colúos, respectively, using the jargon of the popular cockfights).

Jimenes inherited the exorbitant foreign debt accumulated during his predecessor's term of office, the total amount of which had been kept hidden until then. The country's financial situation was catastrophic: customs revenues were in the hands of foreign capital and administrators, who controlled a large part of the treasury's resources.

In an attempt to reestablish government control over financial administration, Jimenes abolished export taxes and decreed the expulsion of foreign personnel who controlled customs. He negotiated directly with the country's European and American creditors. With the former he managed to reach an agreement on the debt, but with the United States (represented by the powerful Santo Domingo Improvement Company) all his efforts were in vain. At the same time, the country suffered continuous revolts and military uprisings.

In April 1902 he was deposed by a movement led by Vice President Horacio Vásquez. The following year, after Vásquez's fall, he tried to retake the government, but the Lilisistas got ahead of him and Alejandro Woss y Gil took power.

== Second presidential term ==
He was re-elected in 1914, after elections controlled by Washington, D.C.. During his second term, he faced continued American interference in Dominican affairs. US President Woodrow Wilson 's administration sought to place the country's economic resources and security forces under Washington 's direct control.

On April 15, 1916, U.S. Secretary of State William Jennings Bryan ordered the invasion of the Dominican Republic. U.S. Marines occupied the country's main cities and took over customs offices.

Jimenes's authority was called into question when the foreign occupation took place and, in May 1916, the nation's Congress voted in favor of the uprising of the Minister of War, General Desiderio Arias. As a result, Jimenes was forced to resign.

He was replaced as president by Francisco Henríquez y Carvajal.

== Death ==
He died in Santo Domingo on May 9, 1919, at the age of 72.

== Sources ==
- Biography of Juan Isidro Jiménez . Available at: http://www.biografiasyvidas.com/biografia/j/jimenez_juan.htm . Consulted on February 2, 2016.
- Jiménez, Juan Isidro (1846–1919) . Available at: http://www.mcnbiografias.com/app-bio/do/show?key=jimenez-juan-isidro . Accessed February 2, 2016.

Political offices
| Preceded by Horacio Vásquez | President of the Dominican Republic; 1899–1902 | Succeeded by Horacio Vásquez |
| Preceded by Ramón Báez | President of the Dominican Republic; 1914–1916 | Succeeded by Council of Secretaries of State |
