= Benito González =

Dominican political activist (1811–1883)

Benito González Jiménez (1811–1883) was a Dominican Republic figure and founding member of the secret political-military society called La Trinitaria. Under the pseudonym Leonidas, he participated in the activities that ultimately led to the separation of the Dominican Republic from Haiti.

He was born in Santo Domingo in 1811. He was one of the founders of the secret independence organization La Trinitaria, and was present at the Puerta del Conde on the night of February 27, 1844.

He actively participated in independence activities alongside Francisco del Rosario Sánchez. After independence, he withdrew almost completely from political activity. He held a few minor positions.

He died in Santo Domingo in 1883.
