= Juan Isidro Pérez =

Dominican revolutionary (1817–1868)

- Born: November 19, 1817; Santo Domingo, Captaincy General of Santo Domingo
- Died: February 7, 1868 (aged 50); Santo Domingo, Dominican Republic
- Occupations: Revolutionary leader, activist, politician
- Years active: 1838–1868
- Known for: Co-founder of Dominican Republic
- Movement: La Trinitaria
- Parents: Valentín Morales (father); Joséfa Antonia Pérez (mother)

Juan Isidro Pérez de la Paz (November 19, 1817 – February 7, 1868) was a Dominican activist who was a key member and co-founder of the secret society La Trinitaria. He was a hero of the Dominican War of Independence.

== Early life ==
He was born in Santo Domingo on November 19, 1817. He was the son of María Josefa Pérez de la Paz y Valerio (1788–1855), and the priest Valentín Morales. He was the uncle of Juan Isidro Jimenes and brother-in-law of Manuel Jimenes. He was a student of Gaspar Hernández, with whom he studied Latin and philosophy. He was also known for his skills as a swordsman.

== Activism ==
He actively fought against the Haitian leader Jean Pierre Boyer in the Reform Revolution carried out in Praslin in 1843. That same year, he was declared captain of one of the companies of the National Guard. Due to the persecution launched by the Haitians, Pérez was one of the rebels who was forced to abandon the cause along with Juan Pablo Duarte and Pedro Alejandro Pina. They returned months later in March 1844 aboard the schooner-brig Leonor, shortly after the Dominican independence was proclaimed.

Following the coup d'état led by Brigadier General Juan Pablo Duarte on June 9, 1844, he served as Secretary of the Central Governing Board of the Dominican Republic.

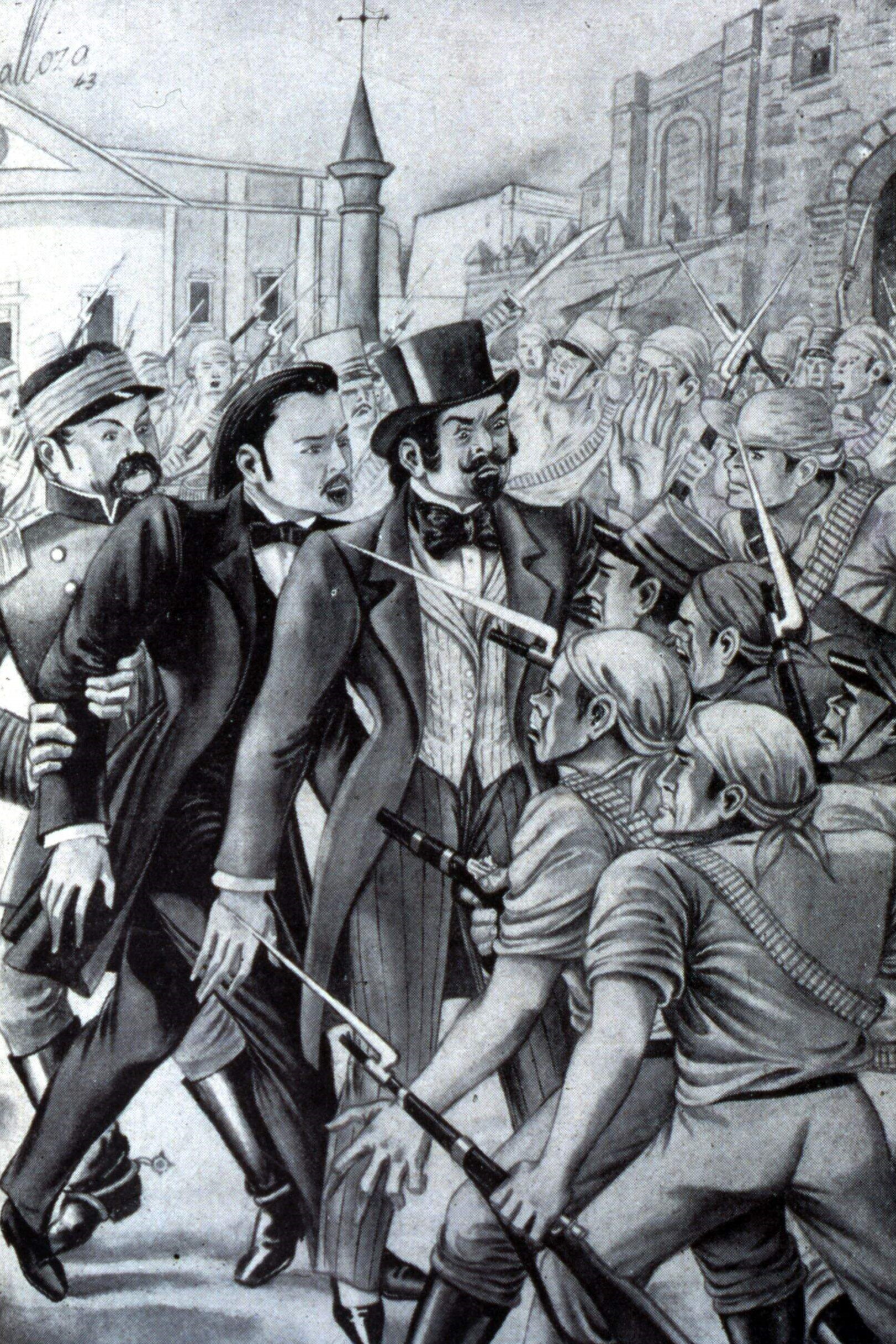
Illustration of Pérez being escorted by Colonel Felipe Alfau to the French consol.

On July 15, two days after Major General Pedro Santana had been proclaimed Supreme Chief, Perez went to the Central Board to inform it of its reorganization. During those moments, Pérez had an incident with a supporter of Santana, called Juan Ruiz; Ruiz claimed that the Board had been dissolved after the proclamation of Santana as Supreme Chief and Pérez would protest against this declaration. They went from arguing to threatening each other and then things escalated after they took out their weapons; Santana would intervene to avoid a tragedy but Pérez would shout at him in a threatening manner: "If Rome had a Brutus, Santo Domingo has one too." Some of Santana's officers, believing that it was a plot to assassinate him, rushed out to the Plaza de Armas while shouting: "To arms, to arms; assassinate Santana." The entire population went to the Plaza de Armas; Some people said "the general is dead" and others shouted: "No, nothing has happened to him, General Santana is alive." Pérez was saved from a lynching by the Seyban troops, devotees of Santana, by the intervention of Colonel Felipe Benicio Alfau and was welcomed in the house of the French consul, Eustache Juchereau de Saint-Denys.

On August 22, he was exiled along with Juan Pablo Duarte and other activists and declared a "traitor to the country" by the Santana government.

In exile he showed signs of dementia, returning to the nation in 1848. Pejoratively called "The Illustrious Madman," he was imprisoned several times.

== Death ==
He died on February 7, 1868, of cholera, in the Military Hospital of Santo Domingo.

== See also ==
- Juan Pablo Duarte
- Pedro Alejandro Pina
- La Trinitaria
- Dominican War of Independence
