= Juan Nepomuceno Ravelo =

Dominican activist (1815–1885)

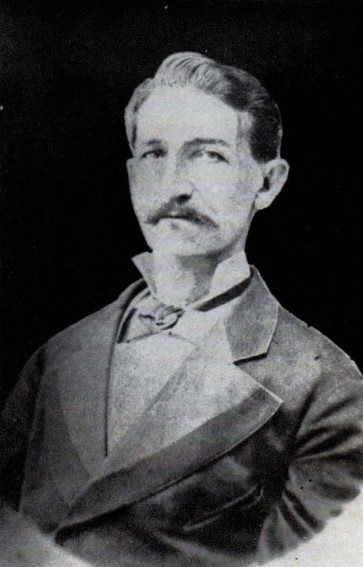
- Born: May 15, 1815; Santo Domingo, Captaincy General of Santo Domingo
- Died: December 24, 1885 (aged 70); Santiago de Cuba, Cuba
- Known for: Founder of La Trinitaria
- Spouse: Altagracia Abreu Razón 1842 ()
- Children: 6

Juan Nepomuceno Ravelo (May 15, 1815 – December 24, 1885) was a Dominican activist and politician, and one of the Founding Fathers of the Dominican Republic.

Ravelo participated in the founding of the La Trinitaria, the secret society that initiated the Dominican War of Independence. He designed the Dominican flag, adopted in 1844.

== Biography ==
He was born in Santo Domingo in 1815. He was one of the founders of the secret independence organization La Trinitaria, and a Colonel in the liberation army in 1844.

On May 19, 1842, he married Altagracia Abreu Razón, with whom he had 6 children: 2 girls and 4 boys.

In 1843, he was linked to the Reform Revolution movement, led by Haitian liberals seeking to end the Boyer dictatorship. He was imprisoned in Haiti while there. Although a Trinitarian, he soon distanced himself from that patriotic group to become involved in internal political struggles.

After the independence proclamation of February 27, 1844, Ravelo served indistinctly the governments of Pedro Santana, Manuel Jiménes and Buenaventura Báez occupying the Ministry of War and Navy, and Public Prosecutor of the Court of First Instance of Santo Domingo, among other public offices.

In 1861, he supported the annexation to Spain, being among those who in 1865, after the Dominican triumph of the Dominican Restoration War, left the Dominican Republic with the Spanish troops to go and live in Cuba, where he died in 1885.

== See also ==
- La Trinitaria
- Juan Pablo Duarte
- Pedro Santana
