= Bernard-Philippe-Alexis Carrié =

Haitian politician and military leader

Bernard-Philippe-Alexis Carrie (1780–1867) was a Haitian military commander and politician.

Born in 1780 in Arcahaie, Saint-Domingue, (present-day Haiti), he was born in the mixed-race family of Alexis Carrie and his wife Marguerite-Anastasie Azema. In 1806, together with generals Henri Christophe, Alexandre Petion and Colonel Jean-Pierre Boyer, he took part in a conspiracy to overthrow Emperor Jean-Jacques Dessalines, then under the command of Boyer participated in the defense of Port-au-Prince.

== See also ==
- Alexandre Pétion
- Jean-Pierre Boyer
- Haitian Revolution
