= Manuel Jimenes =

2nd President of the Dominican Republic (1848–49)

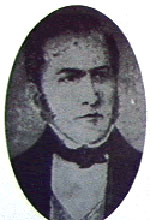
- Portrait of Manuel Jimenes c. 1840s

2nd President of the Dominican Republic
- In office September 8, 1848 – May 29, 1849
- Preceded by: Council of Secretaries of State
- Succeeded by: Buenaventura Báez

General and Minister of War
- In office November 19, 1844 – August 4, 1848

Personal details
- Born: January 14, 1808 Baracoa, Cuba
- Died: December 22, 1854 (aged 46) Port-au-Prince, Haiti
- Resting place: Monte Cristi, Dominican Republic
- Other political affiliations: La Trinitaria
- Spouse: María Francisca Ravelo de los Reyes (1835–18??) Altagracia Pereyra Pérez de la Paz (1849–1854)
- Children: María del Carmen, Isabel Emilia, María de los Dolores, Manuel María and Manuel de Jesús. Juan Isidro Jimenes Pereyra

Military service
- Allegiance: Dominican Republic
- Branch/service: Dominican Army: Liberation Army
- Years of service: 1844–1849
- Rank: General
- Battles/wars: Reform Revolution; Dominican War of Independence

Manuel José Jimenes González (January 14, 1808 – December 22, 1854) was one of the leaders of the Dominican War of Independence. He served as the 2nd President of the Dominican Republic from September 8, 1848, until May 29, 1849. Prior to that he served as the country's Minister of War and Marine Affairs.

The first constitutional governments of the brand new Dominican Republic had to face numerous difficulties. The National Assets Law of July 7, 1845 prevented the Church from recovering the assets confiscated by Jean-Pierre Boyer, putting it at odds with the government of Pedro Santana (1844 – 1848). The growing dictatorial nature of the government caused several deputies and senators to close ranks with the opposition. Added to these two problems were the economic difficulties caused by excessive military expenditures aimed at repelling a Haitian invasion, the poor management of finances and the prolonged drought that ruined the tobacco harvest, depriving the government of important tax revenues, which led to a 250 percent devaluation of the currency. Sick and depressed due to the poor economic situation, Pedro Santana resigned on August 4, 1848, and in his place was the Minister of War and Navy, Manuel Jimenes, a former Trinitario with a liberal tendency.

Without the skills to govern, Manuel Jimenes gradually loosened the reins of power. He dissolved the Army's infantry corps so that his men could go on to cultivate the fields, in addition to earning the antipathy of his supporters for putting obstacles to the return of some Trinitarios, despite the fact that he himself granted them a general amnesty. Unfortunately, a third Haitian invasion in 1849, crushed by Santana, allowed the former president to regain his lost political prestige. Thus, supported by the army, Santana rebelled against the government, and Jimenes, after being defeated in a short but violent civil war, went into exile. In the elections held on August 5, Buenaventura Báez, head of Congress, was elected president, on Santana's recommendation. Jimenes, distraught from his fall from power, left the country for Haiti, where he died in 1854.

== Early years ==
Jimenes was born on January 14, 1808, in Baracoa, Guantanamo, Cuba to Juan Jimenes and Altagracia González, Dominican exiles in Cuba because of Toussaint Louverture’s occupation of Santo Domingo (nowadays the Dominican Republic) and the subsequent wars in the context of the Napoleonic Wars. It is to note that during the early 1800s the Dominican population decreased due to the slave rebellion in Haiti, urging many Dominicans to flee the island: about 4,000 went to Cuba and 100,000 did so to Venezuela while scores exiled in Puerto Rico and Mexico; many Dominicans and their foreign-born children eventually returned to the island.

Between 1810 and 1812 he returned to the country as a child. His parents recovered the estate that the Louverture government had confiscated from them. Living there he was educated and grew up.

According to José Antonio Jimenes Hernández, “Manuel was a university student, and according to the notes of Monsignor Fernando Arturo de Meriño, “he was a clergyman and was about to be ordained, at the age of 18.”

His parents were owners of agricultural, livestock and still businesses in Santo Domingo. Manuel Jimenes also dedicated himself to those businesses.

== Independence plot ==
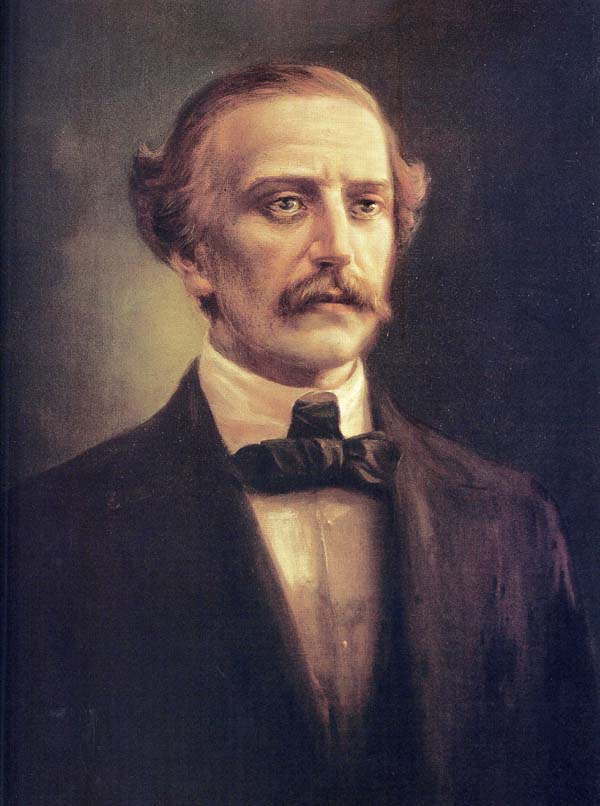
Juan Pablo Duarte, founder of La Trinitaria.

In the years of the Haitian domination, Jiménes decided to get involved with the independence movement. He became involved in movement, La Trinitaria, led by Juan Pablo Duarte. He was a liberal and joined the Reform Revolution in 1843, resulting in the overthrow of Jean Pierre Boyer. He took part in elections with Haitian liberals that sought constitutional reforms to boost the Dominican cause. Unfortunately, the triumph of Charles Rivière-Hérard halted these plans, who responded by launching a full scale persecution against the Trinitarios. Duarte was forced to leave the island, and Jiménes had to go into hiding.

In the days following Duarte's exile, the Trinitarios continued to lead the independence movement. They had to act under the leadership of one of its younger members, Francisco del Rosario Sánchez. They formed an alliance with the conservative Tomás Bobadilla, resulting in the Dominican Act of Independence (1844), which includes signatories from both Trinitarios and conservatives alike.

In preparations for the final phase of the independence, the Trinitarios won support from the 31st and 32nd regiments of the army, of which among the ranks was José Joaquín Puello and his brothers Eusebio and Gabino. Jiménes, at the commission of Sánchez, obtained the support of Martín Girón, an officer who was in charge of the garrison in Puerta del Conde. All of this gave edge for the Trinitarios to officially declare independence on February 27, 1844, where Jiménes witnessed another leader, Matías Ramón Mella, fire the legendary blunderbuss shot that proclaimed the birth of the Dominican Republic.

== Central Government Board ==
In the days following the formation of the First Dominican Republic, He became an active and prominent member and of the Central Government Board. He took office as vice-president of the board, while Sánchez took seat as interim president. He also held the positions of Minister of War and Navy, as well as Minister of the Interior and Police.

However, just as the new government was materializing, in this very city, an uprising had erupted. Santiago Basora, a former slave, led a revolt in the Monte Grande region in response to circulated rumors about alleged intentions by the government to re-establish slavery in the independent nation. (However, the rebels were unaware that the decision to abolish slavery was already agreed upon by the leaders prior to independence from Haiti, as evident in the Dominican Act of Independence). In an attempt to silence these rumors, Jiménes accompanied Tomás Bobadilla to confront the rebels and guarantee the freedom of former slaves. Afterwards, On March 1, 1844, the government immediately issued a decree that reinforced the abolition of slavery. The rebels were even issued a pardon, and incorporated into the "African Battalion" of the Dominican Army.

== Presidency ==
By 1848, President Pedro Santana was facing repudiation from the population, who were protesting the economic crisis suffered by the Dominican Republic. The economic crisis and the parliamentary opposition caused a depression in Santana and therefore in February 1848 he retired to his estate in El Seibo and left the Executive Branch in the hands of a Council of Secretaries of State. However, the retirement created a situation in which opposition to his regime grew and in Congress there were demonstrations of rejection of his economic policy.

In mid-1848, Santana did not even have military support, which was evidenced when he tried, together with General Felipe Benicio Alfau, to dismiss Colonel Tomás Troncoso, accusing him of indecorum, but he did not find soldiers to reinforce his accusations. For this reason, the War Council that tried the soldier declared him innocent. The incident allowed Santana and General Alfau to verify that they did not enjoy sympathy even in the Army. This finally led to Pedro Santana to officially resign from his position on August 4, 1848, before a Council of Secretaries, which assumed the Government until September 8, 1848, when Jimenes, who was the minister of War and Navy.

Following the Santana's resignation, Jiménes was the second constitutional president of the Dominican Republic, on September 8, 1848. Historian Rufino Martínez, from Puerto Plata, says the following: “He persecuted the members of Congress, and placed Santana under accusation so that he would be judged as a conspirator and traitor to the country.”

Jimenes, still a representative of the Trinitarios, did not agree with crime or with any action that disturbed public order. His politics were liberal and his government administration was honest.

=== Policies ===
One of the first things Jiménez did after assuming the presidency was to issue a decree of pardon (on September 26, 1848) of all the exiled revolutionaries who had been previously declared traitors to the homeland, including Duarte. Duarte, however, ignored the pardon. However, in applying the measure, Jimenes acted selectively, because some exiles were denied return to the country. That attitude created difficulties among his followers.

President Jiménez also ordered the disintegration of the Army Infantry corps so that his men could go to work in the fields and promote agriculture.

The political situation began to deteriorate with the culmination of the efforts of a Dominican diplomatic mission in Europe for France to admit the new republic into the international community. France recognized the Dominican Republic as a free and independent State through the provisional signing of a treaty of peace, friendship, commerce, and navigation.

=== Haitian invasion of 1849 ===
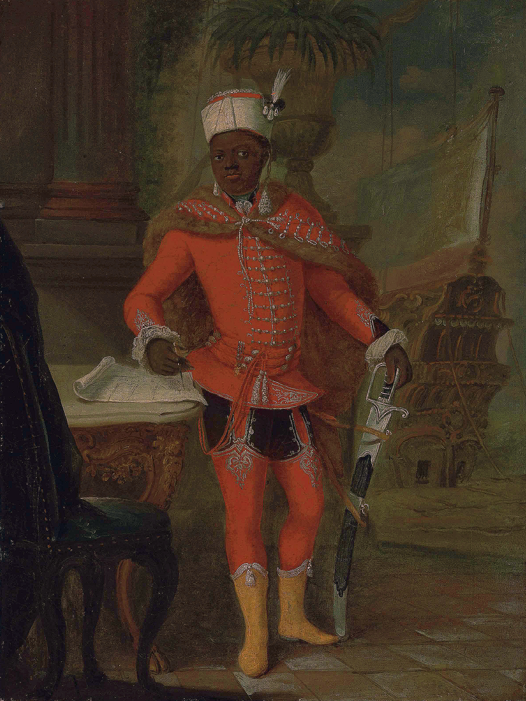
The sudden invasion of Haiti's new ruler, Faustin Soulouque, caused the disruption of France's recognition of Dominican independence.

While the treaty was still in transit, the Haitians took the opportunity to launch another attack. On March 9, 1849, the invasion of the Haitian President Faustin Soulouque took place, who crossed the border with an army of 15,000 men, accompanied by the most important military leaders of that country. They managed to take over all the border towns and arrived in San Juan de la Maguana on March 20, where they set up their headquarters. The Dominican guerrillas could do little to stop them. Jiménes left power in the hands of the council of secretaries of state, and personally headed to the southern region to lead the military campaign against the Haitian invaders. The order was also given for the Dominican warships commanded by General Juan Bautista Cambiaso to reach the waters of the neighboring country with the aim of causing damage to the enemy.

When the Dominican Army was defeated in San Juan de la Maguana, Azua and El Numero, the legislative body called on General Santana on April 2 to take supreme command of the fight, and he was the one with an army of about six thousand Dominican combatants achieved the defeat of the Haitians in the Battle of Las Carreras, in Azua, which lasted three days, from April 19 to 21. This put an end to the third campaign. In the retreat, Soulouque destroyed all the towns he found in his path, and any civilians encountered were massacred along the way.

=== Civil war ===
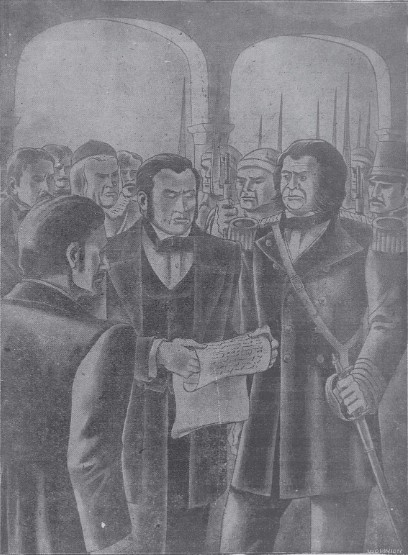
Unable to resist Santana's siege, Jimenes was left with no choice but to renounce his presence.

Jimenes tried to rule Santana out of control of the Army, accusing him of being a traitor to the country and ordered him to hand over command of the Southern Army to General Antonio Duvergé, but Santana did not recognize his authority, receiving the support of generals Merced Marcano, Juan Esteban Aybar, and Bernardino Pérez. Santana ordered his forces not to lay down their arms until a Government was established that respected the Constitution and the laws, which meant declaring rebellion against Jimenes, who responded by dismissing him, but Congress disavowed him and supported Santana's march towards the capital in order to overthrow him.

On May 17, the city of Santo Domingo was declared under a state of siege. The two sides faced each other in a short but violent civil war during which the town of San Carlos, founded by Canarian emigrants in the 17th century, was burned. The consuls of France, England and the United States mediated the conflict and Jiménes capitulated on May 29 to General Santana in the Güibia camp, resigning as President of the Dominican Republic. He left for Puerto Rico, then to Venezuela, then to Curaçao, and then finally, he moved to Haiti.

== Personal life ==
Jimenes married his first wife María Francisca Ravelo de los Reyes on August 19, 1835, in Santo Domingo. The couple had 5 children: María del Carmen, Isabel Emilia, María de los Dolores, Manuel María and Manuel de Jesús.

On May 21, 1849, after marrying his second wife Altagracia Pereyra Pérez, the couple had a son Juan Isidro Jimenes Pereyra, who would later become President of the Dominican Republic.

He was known for being a cockfighting enthusiast. On December 22, 1854, Jimenes died in Port-au-Prince, Haiti. His remains were brought from there in 1889 and rest in the municipal cemetery of Monte Cristi.

== See also ==
- List of presidents of the Dominican Republic
- La Trinitaria
- Tomás Bobadilla
- José Joaquín Puello
- Pedro Santana
- Faustin Soulouque
- Dominican War of Independence
- First Dominican Republic

== Sources ==
- Manuel Jimenes González. Third president of the First Republic . Available at: http://lavendatransparente.wordpress.com/2008/10/02/presidentes-dominicanos-queeran-extranjeros/ . Retrieved January 27, 2016 .
- Jiménez Hernández, José Antonio: Manuel Jiménes, hero of independence, Santo Domingo, Dominican Academy of History, 2001.
- Martínez, Rufino: Dominican Biographical-Historical Dictionary, 1821-1930, Santo Domingo, Autonomous University of Santo Domingo, 1971.
- Moya Pons, Frank: Manual of Dominican history, Santiago, Universidad Católica Madre y Maestra, 1977.
- Soto Jiménez, José Miguel: The heroic battle of Las Carreras in Azua and Baní, in Listín Diario [La Vida], April 29, 2007.
- Presidential descendants: Los Jimenes . Available at: http://www.idg.org.do/capsulas/enero2009/enero20093.htm . Accessed January 27, 2016.

Political offices
Preceded by Council of Secretaries of State	President of the Dominican Republic; 1848–1849	Succeeded by Buenaventura Báez
