= Eustache Juchereau de Saint-Denys =

French diplomat (1809–1883)

Eustace Juchereau de Saint-Denys

French diplomat to Santo Domingo
- In office January 13, 1844 – July 25, 1847
- Monarch: Louis Philipe I
- Preceded by: None
- Succeeded by: Victor Place

Personal details
- Born: 28 March 1809 Bastia, France
- Died: 17 July 1883 (aged 74) Bastia, France
- Occupation: Diplomat

Eustache Jean Juchereau de Saint-Denys (March 28, 1809 – June 17, 1883), was a lawyer, diplomat, polyglot, correspondent and French legislator of French-Canadian origin, graduated from the Faculty of Law of the University of Paris. He was one of the leading French diplomats to the Dominican Republic during the Dominican War of Independence.

Coming from a family of noble lineage and legitimist orientation, he entered the French diplomatic service and developed his career in several European, Asian and American countries, including Greece, Turkey, Spain, Haiti and, especially, the newly born Dominican Republic. In December 1843, he participared, along with his colleagues Adolphe Barrot and André-Nicolas Levasseur, in the negotiations held in Port-au-Prince with several Dominican deputies present at the Haitian Constituent Assembly.

During the first months of the First Dominican Republic's existence, he maintained good relations with all of the rulers, without being influenced by personal sympathies. He forged bonds of respect and cooperation with members of the Central Government Board —among them Francisco del Rosario Sánchez, Tomás Bobadilla, and José María Caminero —although his most notable influence was exercised over Pedro Santana, a general who had come to power after the coup of July 1844, and who viewed the Duartistas with suspicion, a group rejected by the French consul. Saint-Denys established himself as one of the most influential figures in Santana's first government, alongside ministers and senior military commanders. After completing his mission in the Caribbean in 1847, he decided to retire from diplomatic life and returned to his hometown in Corsica, where he lived until his death on June 17, 1883.

== Early years ==
Eustache Jean Juchereau de Saint-Denys was born on March 28, 1809 in Bastia, Corsica, under the First French Empire of Emperor Napoleon Bonaparte, his famous Corsican compatriot who then dominated much of Europe.

He was the son of Louis Juchereau de Saint-Denys (b. 1778) and Marie Antoinette de Rossi (b. 1790). His paternal grandfather, Eustache Marie Juchereau de Saint-Denys (1741–1792), a French-Canadian born in Beauport, New France, was a lieutenant colonel in the Artillery and a Chevalier of the Order of Saint Louis. During the September Massacres of the French Revolution, he was assassinated for his loyalty to Louis XVI on September 4, 1792 at Charleville-Mézières, where he was in command, at the age of 50. Eustache Marie's mother—and Eustache Jean's great-grandmother—was Marie Françoise Chartier de Lotbinière, daughter of Eustache Chartier de Lotbinière (1688–1749), Sieur de Lotbinière, an important civil servant in New France. After being widowed by Marie Françoise (1693–1723), daughter of Captain François-Marie Renaud d'Avène des Méloizes (1655–1699) and Françoise-Thérèse (b. 1670), he was ordained a priest by the Bishop of Quebec and appointed canon, archdeacon of Notre-Dame Cathedral, and Vicar general of the diocese of Quebec.

In his youth, he acquired a command of modern Greek, Italian, and Spanish. He earned a law degree from the Faculty of Law of Paris.

During the Restoration (1815–1830), under the reign of Louis XVI's brother, Charles X (1824–1830), France recognized the independence of Greece with the signing of the Treaty of London (1827), following the emancipation of that country from the Ottoman Empire in 1825. With the accession of Count Ioannis Kapodistrias as the first sovereign of the Hellenic State, the French Minister of Foreign Affairs, Count Auguste de La Ferronnays, announced to the Greek government on May 7, 1828 the appointment of Baron Antoine Juchereau de Saint-Denys, Eustache's uncle, as French consular agent to Greece, taking with him the young Saint-Denys as consular attaché. The Saint-Denys remained in the First Hellenic Republic until the Baron's replacement in 1829.

Eustache Juchereau de Saint-Denys entered the French consular service on April 1, 1834. He was appointed consul at Tarsus on March 20, 1834 and promoted to consul of the second class in July 1839. On January 17, 1843 he took up the post of consul at Bilbao, Spain.

== Diplomacy in Hispaniola ==
=== Sponsorship of independence ===
On July 25, 1843, he was appointed consul to Haiti, a former French colony that had undergone the Reform Revolution a few months earlier, a rebellion that deposed dictator Jean-Pierre Boyer (1818–1843). This uprising had repercussions in neighboring Santo Domingo, the eastern part of Hispaniola (present-day Dominican Republic), then occupied by Haiti since 1822. The new Haitian government led to the formation of a Constituent Assembly in which both Haitian and Dominican representatives participated.

The sudden appointment to this new post was no coincidence. Auguste Levasseur, former Consul General of the Kingdom of France in Haiti – a position he would return to in August 1843 – informed the French Minister of Foreign Affairs, François Guizot, in June of that year, how essential it was to appoint a consul of the kingdom in the city of Santo Domingo, taking advantage of the notorious cultural and religious differences between Dominicans and Haitians, influencing them to separate from Haiti and, at the same time, seek the protectorate of France, which would receive in exchange control or possession of the Samaná Peninsula.

Saint-Denys arrived in Port-au-Prince, the capital of Haiti, on November 28, 1843. He traveled on the frigate La Aurora, accompanied by Adolphe Barrot, France's plenipotentiary in that country. Officially, his mission was to assume the consulate in Cap-Haïtien, a city that had been almost destroyed by an earthquake on May 7, 1842. This circumstance provided an argument for claiming accommodation difficulties. Therefore, it was decided to transfer him to Santo Domingo, in the eastern part of the island.

Before leaving, Saint-Denys became involved in Dominican politics for the first time by associating with several deputies of the Haitian Assembly and, at the urging of André Levasseur, launched an ambitious project for a French protectorate over Santo Domingo, named after the Consul General as the Levasseur Plan. The initiative proposed transforming the Dominican territory into an independent republic under the protection of France and administered by a governor general appointed by the French crown, provided that the Dominicans themselves accepted the established conditions.

The project was negotiated by Saint-Denys, Barrot and Consul General Levasseur himself. It was presented to the Dominican deputies in Port-au-Prince on December 15, 1843. Among those who supported it were prominent figures such as Buenaventura Báez, Manuel María Valencia, Francisco Javier Abreu, Remigio del Castillo, Juan Nepomuceno Tejera, Manuel Ángel Rojas and the priest José Santiago Díaz de Peña.

This plan did not emerge from nowhere. Since 1840, Father Tomás de Portes e Infante, who was Vicar General of the Archdiocese of Santo Domingo —since 1830, sede vacante due to the exile of Archbishop Pedro Valera y Jiménez (1757–1833)—had already been in contact with Consul Levasseur. This was because the French king Louis Philippe I (1830–1848) had ordered the return to the Catholic Church of the property that had been taken from it during the French Revolution. The matter was of particular importance in Santo Domingo, where the Church had lost its properties during the Haitian occupation. For this reason, the France of the July Monarchy presented itself as a closer interlocutor than Isabelline Spain, which, while maintaining rights on the island according to the Treaty of Paris (1814), had embraced an anti-clerical policy under the regency of Espartero.

Dominican deputies approved the Levasseur Plan, however the project was leaked prematurely, being discovered not by the Haitian authorities, but by the Dominican conspirators known as filorios—followers of Juan Pablo Duarte, also known as duartistas—and independentists linked to them. One of them, José María Serra de Castro, discovered the project and learned that the supporters of the Levasseur Plan would declare the independence of the eastern part of the island under the auspices of France by April 25, 1844; which prompted the filorios—who would not allow anyone to get ahead of them in this purpose—to advance the independence declaration, setting the date of February 25, 1844, although it finally occurred on February 27.

Meanwhile, on January 1, 1844, supporters of the Levasseur Plan in the city of Azua distributed a manifesto justifying Haiti's separation under French protection. Later, on January 16, the conservative lawyer, Tomás Bobadilla, with the support of his group and the Trinitarios, published the Dominican Act of Independence (1844), in which he set forth the reasons for making emancipation necessary and alluded in veiled terms to the Levasseur Plan, noting that, in addition to Haiti's own resources, they would resort to "those that foreigners could provide us in such a case."

While all this was happening, Saint-Denys set sail from Port-au-Prince on December 31, 1843, on the corvette La Naiade. He arrived in Santo Domingo on January 13, 1844. The following day, he disembarked and was received by two Haitian generals: Pablo Alí, governor of the department of Ozama, and Henri Étienne Desgrottes, commander of the city. His presence raised expectations among the Dominican independence fighters, who hoped that France might support their cause.

As Consul in Santo Domingo, he played a pivotal role during the independence revolt of 1844. On the night of February 27, 1844, when the first shots of the uprising were heard, numerous women and children sought refuge in his residence, carrying valuables to protect them from the feared Haitian troops, known for their excesses. Despite the Consul's efforts to reassure the terrified neighbors, the panic was such that many preferred to remain in the neighboring houses, prepared to return in case their lives were in danger.

The Casa de la Argolla, former seat of the French consulate in Santo Domingo, was the site of the negotiated surrender of the Haitians on February 28, 1844. (It was previously housed there by French Governor Jean-Louis Ferrand during the Era de France. Later, it was occupied by his victor at Palo Hincado, Spanish Governor Juan Sánchez Ramírez, hero of the War of the Reconquista.)At dawn on February 28, 1844, brothers Pedro and Ramón Santana entered Santo Domingo with a large army. Colonel Pedro Santana immediately visited the French consul's residence to express his support for the Levasseur Plan. According to Saint-Denys, he maintained "a true friendship" with Pedro Santana, whose conduct, he affirmed, "earned his complete trust."

That same day, the Haitian military commanders stationed in the city surrendered bloodlessly at the Casa de la Arroga—then the seat of the French consulate—where they signed their surrender. The following day, General Desgrottes, following Saint-Denys' instructions, formally handed the Ozama Fortress to the command of the Dominican forces.

=== Attempt of a French protectorate ===
On March 3, 1844, Saint-Denys informed the French Ministry of Foreign Affairs of the Dominican governmental body's sympathy for his country. With the consummation of independence, a provisional Governing Junta was formed, composed mostly of Filorians—five of its members—with Tomás Bobadilla as the sole exception. The Central Government Board soon expanded beyond that initial circle: on March 1, it had twelve members, of whom four were Filorians and seven belonged to other factions, including Francisco Abreu, former Dominican deputy in the Haitian Constituent Assembly and supporter of the Levasseur Plan.

Meanwhile, military leadership was left in the hands of Pedro Santana, appointed Brigadier General and commander of the Southern Army on March 7, 1844, who departed for the border on the 13th to secure independence. Just the following day, March 8, Bobadilla —who had been president of the Central Junta since March 1 —met at the consul's residence to discuss the question of the protectorate. Saint-Denys explained the French government's likely position. Shortly thereafter, Brigadier General Francisco del Rosario Sánchez —a member of the Governing Junta and referred to by the consul as "the leader of the revolutionary party"—held a similar meeting and received a warning that France would not intervene without an express request from the Board, warning that proclaiming the protectorate contradicted the manifesto of January 16, 1844. However, he proposed a confidential procedure: the Board could send a secret letter committing itself to including the protectorate in the future Constitution or in a specific treaty.

That same afternoon, Bobadilla and Sánchez presented this alternative to their colleagues, and later an official delegation delivered a letter signed by all nine members, expressing the Dominican desire to formalize the request for protectorate status and establish diplomatic relations with France.

Saint-Denys immediately transmitted the request to the Ministry of Foreign Affairs in Paris, reporting "a strong desire to raise the French flag without waiting for the initiative of France." Minister Guizot, however, rejected the proposal on May 30, 1844, arguing that a protectorate would damage relations with Great Britain and Ireland and contradict Spain's claims of sovereignty over Santo Domingo. The consul had no direct knowledge of this resolution until some time later.

Consul Saint-Denys transmitted the request to the Ministry of Foreign Affairs, reporting a "strong desire to raise the French flag without waiting for action from the French government." However, Guizot, according to the report received, rejected the idea, since accepting a protectorate on the island would spoil relations with Great Britain and Ireland, and since Spain still claimed sovereignty over Santo Domingo. The government in Paris officially informed Saint-Denys on May 30, 1844, of its refusal to accept the protectorate proposal. However, the consul did not actually learn of this decision until some time later.

In a letter dated March 15, 1844 to French Admiral Alphonse Louis Théodore de Mogès, commander of the French fleet in the Antilles, Saint-Denys had declared with some enthusiasm: "I do not believe I am committing myself if I tell you that if we demand with a little insistence, the French colors will soon replace the Dominican colors in Santo Domingo." However, just nine days later, in a communication to Minister Guizot himself (March 24), he acknowledged the need to moderate his action: "Far from demanding with a little insistence, on the contrary, I am obliged to reduce my influence so that the Junta does not raise the French colors quickly."

On the other hand, some members who were initially reluctant to support the Levasseur Plan later became its most fervent defenders. Without holding official consultations, the Santo Domingo Junta sent Saint-Denys confidential communications warning that, if the war of independence failed, they would raise the French tricolor. In this context of war, Santana, two days before defeating Haitian President Charles Rivière-Hérard in the Battle of Azua, had already requested the consul's support for a French expeditionary force. On March 28, the consul arranged a meeting between Bobadilla and Alphonse de Moges, who on the 31st offered himself to President Hérard as a mediator between Haiti and the newly formed Dominican Republic. The following day, he personally met with Herárd.

On April 14, 1844, Santana asked Bobadilla to reactivate "negotiations" with France, should they be at a standstill. In his April 23 report to Guizot, Saint-Denys reported that, after speaking with Bobadilla—who was speaking on behalf of Santana—it had become clear that it was absolutely necessary for France to make an explicit gesture of support for the Dominicans. Santana believed that a moderate loan would suffice; some French officers and a few hundred soldiers from the French Antilles would offer his troops the necessary confidence.

On May 19, 1844, the consul met with the Santana brothers in Santo Domingo; Pedro Santana, who was making a lightning visit to the city, assured him that he, his brother, and their troops would defend the French protectorate, even by the use of force.

On May 26, 1844, in a public session of the Junta in the city's Plaza de Armas, Bobadilla revealed that a project to cede Samaná to France in perpetuity had been approved since March 8. This project had the support of the head of the archdiocese, Tomás de Portes e Infante. The proposal was immediately rejected by the members of the Board, Manuel María Valverde, and Generals Manuel Jimenes —vice president of the Board—and Duarte, who considered the surrender of national territory unacceptable.

On May 28, Saint-Denys presented a new version offering a loan of three million pesos with the Samaná Peninsula as collateral. Under pressure that the French representative would withdraw with his agents if the new terms were not accepted, the majority of the members signed the agreement, with the exception of Duarte, who refused and resigned his post. However, this rejection was short-lived. On June 1, 1844, General Duarte returned to the Junta and approved the revised text, which abolished the perpetual cession and restricted the occupation of Samaná to cases of temporary need. Despite the agreement, a military conspiracy led by his supporters began to take shape.

On June 9, 1844, the coup d'état of the 18 Dominican Brumaire took place, organized by officers of the African Battalion, such as Santiago Basora and loyalists to Duarte. During the coup, he was proclaimed head of the Dominican Army by Colonel José Joaquín Puello. This uprising deposed the members Bobadilla and José María Caminero, recently appointed president of the Junta. Francisco del Rosario Sánchez facilitated the escape of those deposed and entered as vice president of the new Junta, then presided over by Manuel Jimenes.

The anti-filorios—among them Báez, Abreu, Manuel Joaquín del Monte and Francisco Ruiz—sought asylum in the French consulate, which had become the headquarters of the political counteroffensive, and pushed for Santana's return to the capital. Meanwhile, Puello called on the black population to rise up, warning that the protectorate could reintroduce slavery; Saint-Denys clarified, however, that there was no official resolution authorizing military intervention. Although Duarte held the moral leadership of the movement, he avoided direct confrontations with French diplomacy and the position of the consul remained exactly the same. However, the propaganda of his circle eroded sympathy for the French in the Cibao and weakened the prestige of officers such as José María Imbert.

From June 18, 1844, Sánchez assumed the presidency of the Board. He held several meetings with Saint-Denys, assuring him that the coup was a response to "imperative circumstances of the moment" and did not break diplomatic relations. He also affirmed that the proposals formulated by the Dominican Republic would remain intact and that the commitments made would be fulfilled.

=== Advisor to Pedro Santana ===
On July 3, 1844, in Azua, Santana attempted to hand over command of the Army of the South to Colonel José Esteban Roca, as planned by mandate of the Junta. However, the soldiers refused to accept the change and demanded that Santana remain in command. The Army of the South spontaneously proclaimed Santana Supreme Commander of the Republic, a title he rejected. The following day, in Santiago, Duarte was proclaimed president by General Matías Matías Mella and the Army of the North, defying central authority in Santo Domingo.

The Board, for its part, began to worry about Santana's return. Puello, co-author of the 18 Dominican Brumaire, received rumors that Santana was planning to arrive in the capital with his troops to impose his rule. Therefore, the Junta decided to receive him only if he came without soldiers. Tensions increased so much that even the French consul, concerned for the safety of the French living on the island, threatened to withdraw if force was used against Santana. This threat forced the Board to adopt a more moderate attitude.

Following a conversation between Saint-Denys and Sánchez, the latter met with Santana in the town of San Cristóbal to coordinate his entry into the city accompanied by his army. Thus, on July 12, 1844, Santana arrived in the capital and, together with the staff officers of the Southern Army, signed a document requesting French recognition of Dominican independence and its protection.

Santana was proclaimed dictator with the title of Supreme Chief in a counter-coup on July 13. However, the following day, July 14, Santana gave a speech in which he rejected the dictatorship, saying it was a dangerous and damaging position. Instead, he proposed calling elections to form a Constituent Assembly and establish a permanent government. This decision was influenced by the French consul Saint-Denys, who advised him to retain the Junta, not seize absolute power, and adhere to the ideals of the January 16 manifesto.

The consul did not fail to assist even those who did not share his political affiliations. This occurred on the 15th, when a minor altercation broke out at the Junta headquarters between Juan Isidro Pérez, a former member of the Junta close to Duarte, and Juan Ruiz, a supporter of Santana, over the issue of whether the July 13 coup had dissolved the Junta. Ruiz believed it had, but Pérez believed it had not.

The argument escalated to the point where an armed confrontation was feared. Santana, who was present, tried to calm the situation, but an unfortunate remark by Pérez, which seemed to allude to an alleged plot against the Supreme Commander, led Santana's officers to believe that an attack was being planned. They were on the verge of lynching him, had it not been for the timely intervention of Colonel Felipe Benicio Alfau and the consul himself, who managed to guide Pérez to the French consulate, where he found refuge.

By August 1844, the Filarios had already been neutralized by the new Junta, now presided over by Santana. Duarte, Sánchez, Mella, Pérez, and other loyalist leaders were declared traitors. Even so, the consul offered his sympathy to Sánchez, who was arrested on July 17, 1844, for refusing to collaborate in actions against Duarte, who had irregularly served as president of the Dominican Republic in the Cibao. Despite his recommendations, Santana ignored the diplomat's requests.

Once that crisis was over, a Constituent Congress met in San Cristóbal on September 24, 1844, with the mandate of drafting a Magna Carta to replace the January Manifesto. One of its most controversial articles was Article 210, which empowered the President of the Republic to make decisions without any responsibility during the war, including absolute command of the army. According to Consul Saint-Denys, he was the one who suggested this article, which gave Santana almost dictatorial power whenever he invoked this provision.

Likewise, the consul inserted other clauses into the new Constitution, such as the admission of foreigners—without distinction of nationality—to the immediate enjoyment of full civil rights, provided they exercised a useful art or trade. They were also recognized certain political rights, under certain conditions, and were guaranteed the right to own and transmit property on equal terms with Dominican citizens, something that was impossible for white foreigners under the Haitian regime. The Constitution of San Cristóbal was concluded on November 6, 1844, and a few days later, the Constituent Assembly elected Santana as president; he was sworn in on November 14.

On November 20, Guizot, fearful of upsetting Great Britain, postponed his official response to the protectorate project his own consul had negotiated in Port-au-Prince. That same day, he sent a dispatch to Messrs. Levasseur and Saint-Denys expressing his support for a "healthy influence on the pacification of the island" and for "protective action in the direction of its destiny that is in accordance with our interests, those of humanity and civilization." He also categorically rejected any eventual occupation of Samaná. Furthermore, Guizot personally wrote to Levasseur to insist on the definitive renunciation of the protectorate: "I am writing at this time to the King's Consul in Santo Domingo, who has reiterated in one of his recent letters the proposal for a protectorate. It is important that Mr. Juchereau de Saint-Denys definitively renounce this project."

Shortly after, the French consul informed the Dominican government that France would not accept the protectorate and that, as long as Haiti did not recognize the separation, the independence of the Dominican Republic would not be recognized either. Since 1838, France considered the entire island to be Haitian territory and therefore viewed the Dominicans as rebels. Despite this, Guizot proposed that one way to recognize Dominican independence was for the new Dominican Republic to assume part of the debt that Haiti owed to France, given that the territory had been under Haitian control until 1844. In April 1845, Santana officially rejected this claim, although he later considered offering some financial compensation to France. The only member of his cabinet who opposed assuming part of the Haitian debt was Bobadilla, then Minister of Foreign Affairs, who, after initially showing himself favorable to the French, ended up advocating a rapprochement with Spain.

== Final years and death ==
In mid-1847, Saint-Denys requested permission to travel to France. The government granted him the necessary permission. On July 25 of that same year, he departed Santo Domingo for the island of Saint Thomas. He left the consulate under the responsibility of his chancellor, Malespine. On October 14, 1847, the new consul, Victor Place, arrived. His arrival provoked revulsion within the Haitian government. After those years of service, Saint-Denys officially became inactive, effective August 1, 1848.

On November 27, 1848, the French Foreign Ministry ordered him to return to Santo Domingo. Saint-Denys replied to the minister that he was unable to do so. He claimed that his health had seriously deteriorated due to the years he had lived in the Caribbean climate. He declared that he found it impossible to accept the mission of managing the ratification of the treaty of recognition by France, recently signed in October of that same year. (The treaty was ratified in 1852). Despite being called the "godfather of the Dominican separation revolution," he remained firm in his refusal.

He remained in retirement until 31 July 1851. In April of that year he married Constance-Marie Otard de la Grange in Périgord. She was the daughter of Baron Jean-Baptiste Antoine Otard de La Grange (1773–1824), a staunch defender of the throne and the altar. No subsequent charges are known to have been made against him. He retired to live in his native Corsica, where he died in Bastia on 17 June 1883.

== See also ==
- Pedro Santana
- Dominican coup of 18 Brumaire
- Dominican War of Independence
