= Dominican coup of July 1844 =

1844 counter-coup that ousted Francisco del Rosario Sánchez from power

Dominican coup of July 1844 Golpe de Estado del Julio de 1844
- Part of the Dominican War of Independence
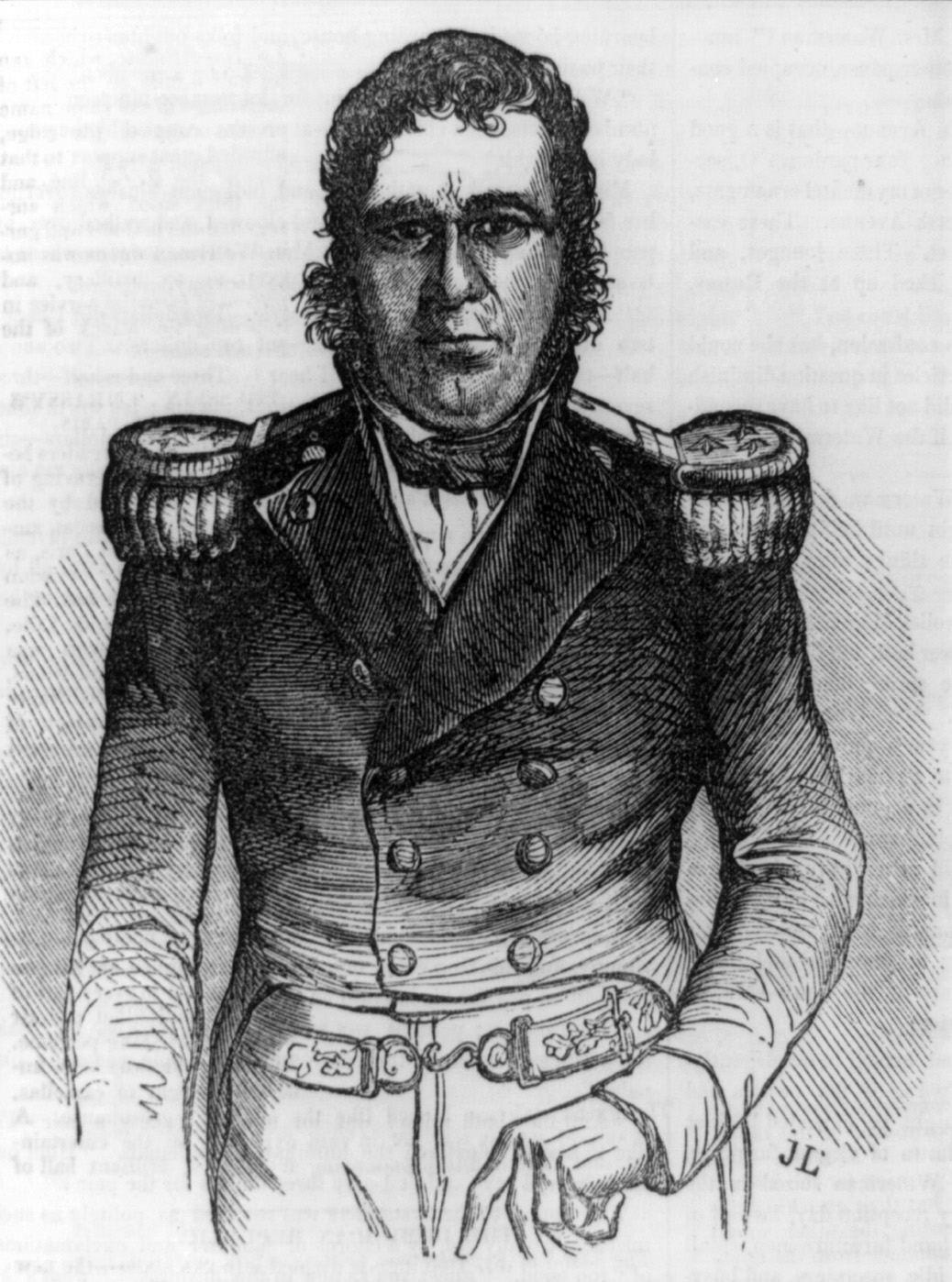
- Pedro Santana, General of the Southern Army and initiator of the coup
- Date: July 13, 1844
- Location: Santo Domingo, Dominican Republic
- Type: Counter-coup
- Organized by: Pedro Santana
- Outcome: Coup successful; Deposition of Francisco del Rosario Sánchez; Presidency restored to Tomás Bobadilla

The Dominican coup of July 1844 was a non-violent, civilian-military soft coup, successfully executed on July 13, 1844, by the Southern Frontier Expeditionary Navy — also known as the Southern Army —vwith the support of large segments of the population of Santo Domingo. Its explicit purpose was to end the state of affairs inaugurated by the coup d'état of June 9 of the same year. The Southern Army, supported by the people of the capital, proclaimed General Pedro Santana, commander-in-chief of that force, as Supreme Chief —a position equivalent to dictator — who presented himself as the guarantor of the restoration of order and of giving the State a stable and lasting government.

This military counter-coup—the second coup d'état in the history of the Dominican Republic —crowned General Pedro Santana as the supreme pillar of order and brought an end to the political crisis that began in June. It also inaugurated a prolonged period of caudillo hegemony during the remainder of the First Dominican Republic (1844–1861), under the strong influence of Pedro Santana's figure and decisions.

== Background ==
The First Dominican Republic, barely three months after gaining independence from Haitian rule, was shaken by the coup d'état of June 9, 1844 — also known as the Dominican 18 Brumaire — ostensibly in opposition to the French protectorate project . This military action, led by General Juan Pablo Duarte — leader of the Filorios or Duartistas and member of the Central Governing Board —and Colonel José Joaquín Puello —commander of arms of the city of Santo Domingo —had the support of a small group of officers from the Liberation Army and the African Battalion. As a result, the president of the Governing Board, José María Caminero, and members Tomás Bobadilla and Carlos Moreno de Hoyos were deposed .

Following the coup, immediate arrests were ordered, including those of Caminero and Bobadilla. However, both managed to escape thanks to a timely warning from General Francisco del Rosario Sánchez, a Duarte supporter and also a member of the Central Junta. Meanwhile, opponents of Duarte 's movement —such as Buenaventura Báez, Francisco Javier Abreu, Manuel Joaquín del Monte, and Francisco Ruiz—took refuge in the French consulate, which became the center of operations for those opposed to the Duarte cause. From there, a countermovement was organized, awaiting the swift arrival of Major General Pedro Santana, head of the Southern Army—also known as the Southern Border Expeditionary Army, part of the Liberation Army —who had been summoned after news of the coup's success.

Although the coup was publicly presented as an action against the French protectorate, the new Governing Junta held talks with the French consul, Eustache Juchereau de Saint-Denys. Sánchez, now president of the Governing Junta, even reaffirmed, on behalf of the government, its willingness to honor previous agreements related to the protectorate, revealing that the Duarte supporters were not entirely opposed to the project. Tensions in the country escalated when Puello sent emissaries into the interior to incite the Black population to resist a supposed French invasion aimed at enslaving them. Amid the uproar, Saint-Denys clarified that the protectorate had not been approved by France.

From its inception, the Santo Domingo Junta, which emerged from the coup, was shrouded in illegitimacy. The country, still at war with Haiti, began to descend into anarchy, with separatist movements such as the one aspiring to independence for the Cibao region. In the south, far from the central political scene and under the constant threat of Haiti, the Southern Army operated. This force had defeated the Haitians in battles such as those of March 19 in Azua, El Memiso, and Tortuguero.

Following the coup d'état in Haiti on May 3, 1844, which deposed Haitian President Charles Rivière-Hérard, the Haitian army withdrew from the city of Compostela de Azua and the town of San Juan, though not before burning Compostela de Azua and part of San Juan. This allowed Santana to occupy several towns that had previously been under Haitian control, although he failed to capture San Miguel de la Atalaya, San Rafael de la Angostura, San Gabriel de las Caobas, or Hincha.

By June 15, 1844, Santana was in Las Matas de Farfán and later in San Juan. That same day, his brother, General Ramón Santana, who had been ill for several days, died in Santo Domingo. In response, Santana requested to be relieved of his command as Commander-in-Chief of the Southern Army by the Junta, so that he could travel to the capital, recover, and attend to his deceased brother's affairs.

On July 3, 1844, in the Plaza de Armas of Azua, Santana prepared to hand over command of the Southern Army to Colonel José Esteban Roca, appointed provisionally until the arrival of the new commander-in-chief, Sánchez, named by the Dominican Junta on June 23. However, the transfer did not take place. The troops flatly refused to part with Santana, as expressed by Colonel Manuel Mora, who said: "We don't want Colonel Roca, nor will we allow them to take Santana from us!" In the end, Santana and Roca agreed to suspend the proceedings and report to the Junta. Subsequently, the Army accompanied Santana and proclaimed him Supreme Chief of the Republic, although he rejected the title.

The next day, in Santiago de los Caballeros, Duarte's pronouncement took place. General Matías Ramón Mella and the Army of the North appointed Duarte as president of the Republic, making it clear that they no longer obeyed the Junta. The situation was curious, because Mella and the members of the Junta were from the Duarte faction. When news spread that Santana had set sail and would soon arrive in the capital, rumors began to spread everywhere. Santana's friends said he was coming to teach them a lesson. This prompted the Junta, influenced by Puello, to declare that Santana would be allowed entry if he came alone, but if he brought his troops, they would stop him with guns. Secret arrangements were made for several days, in case a fight broke out. The alarm spread quickly, and Santana's followers rushed to acquire weapons, making an imminent conflict even more likely.

The French consul, Saint-Denys, seeing the tense atmosphere and worried about his people in the country, warned that he would expel all French citizens if the Junta used force against Santana. This calmed things down somewhat, and the Junta, along with Puello, remained composed. Sánchez spoke with the consul about Santana's entry and then went to the town of San Cristóbal to coordinate the arrival. In the pamphlet * Political Life of Pedro Santana, Current President of the Dominican Republic * (1856)—published anonymously by Felix María del Monte— it is recounted that the meeting between Generals Santana and Sánchez took place in the Church of San Cristóbal. There, Santana complained that he lacked the resources to support his soldiers. Sánchez detailed, point by point, the shipments recently made. Santana then changed his tone of voice and swore to God that he had no sinister intentions against the government, but only to bid farewell to the army within the walls of the capital, thank them, and retire to private life.

On July 12, 1844, Santana entered the capital in the rain, but that did not stop the cheers of the people upon his arrival. Shortly afterward, he appeared at the Borgellá Palace, headquarters of the Junta, accompanied by his large staff: Lucas Díaz, Fernando Tavera, Juan Francisco Guerrero, Pedro Linares, Antonio Duvergé, Antonio Abad Alfau, and Merced Marcano. There he signed a document in which the Junta requested that France recognize Dominican independence and grant it its protection. Santana's first visit after meeting with the Junta was to the French consul, who received him at five in the afternoon along with his staff. The meeting did not allow for an in-depth discussion of the country's problems. Before leaving, Santana promised to return the following day to have dinner with the consul and discuss important matters calmly and at leisure.

== Coup d’etat ==
On July 13, 1844, at seven in the morning, General Santana appeared in the Plaza de Armas of Santo Domingo, in front of the cathedral, with all his troops assembled. He reviewed the Black troops of the garrison and those who had followed him from Baní. General Puello stood nearby and remained by his side throughout the day. It was estimated that there were approximately 4,000 soldiers, joined during the night by some of the men that Santana had left in San Cristóbal. A large crowd of people filled the Plaza de Armas in the early morning, which was partially occupied by the troops.

Before that crowd, Santana delivered a speech. He expressed his desire to retire from public life, while simultaneously offering his fortune and his services to defend the nation once again should the situation demand it. He called upon all Dominicans to seek harmony and unity. In closing, he said: “I have no ambition whatsoever; I desire nothing but your happiness and the glory of my country. If my epaulettes could be detrimental to the interests of the nation, I will surrender them to you, my comrades in arms, who entrusted them to me.” A burst of enthusiasm swept through the ranks of the Southern Army, loyal to General Santana. He tried to tear off his epaulettes—symbols of his authority—but his staff officers prevented him. General Mercedes Marcano declared that it was essential for Santana to remain in command of the troops, as the situation demanded, and concluded with "Long live the Supreme Leader!", which was echoed by the troops and the people present. Throughout the Plaza and its surroundings, cheers resounded: "Long live General Santana! Long live the savior of the nation! Long live President Santana!" Thousands of voices added the cry: "Down with the Junta!"

With the support of the Southern Army and the people of the capital, Santana was invested as dictator with the title of Supreme Chief, disregarding the supreme authority of the Central Government Board, although it was not entirely clear whether the Board would be dissolved. All those present joined in the act. The same slogans were repeated in the city streets, and the members of the Board, gathered in the Borgellá Palace, watched the scene from their balcony. Then, after consulting with his General Staff, Santana announced to the residents of the capital that he did not wish to govern alone and that he would establish a provisional government until a permanent and stable one could be formed. The news was received with hope, relief, and renewed cheers of the same kind. After addressing his soldiers a few more words, he promoted three brigadier generals and two colonels, thus concluding the military ceremony. Followed by the people and the army, he marched to the arsenal at the Ozama Fortress, where he held a second review; immediately afterward, the troops returned to their barracks.

Santana arranged for his men from El Seybo to occupy the Tribune and all the military posts in the city—previously entrusted by Puello to the African Battalion—without immediately withdrawing those soldiers with whom there was distrust. He had some 2,500 Black soldiers at his disposal; to avoid divisions, he made concessions that reassured them about their future. His General Staff, composed almost entirely of loyal Black officers, was key to restoring order and trust. He spent the rest of the day receiving the numerous delegations that came to congratulate him and offer their services.

== Aftermath ==
On the evening of July 13, 1844, General Santana visited the French consul, Eustache Juchereau de Saint-Denys. After dinner, they discussed the day's events and the affairs of the country. Santana confessed that if he rejected the dictatorship they wanted to offer him, he would feel he was failing in his duty due to his lack of experience. He asked Saint-Denys for his opinion and recounted that his friends were advising him to take violent measures, to seek revenge and punishment, but that this went against his principles. Everything indicated that Santana was about to decide to dissolve the Central Government Board and assume the dictatorship himself.

Saint-Denys tried to dissuade him. He advised him to seek justice for the coup d'état of June 9 and the pronouncement of July 4, and to return to legality and the principles of the Manifesto of January 16, 1844, while a permanent government was being organized. He proposed that he reject any kind of personal dictatorship that would place the responsibility for his actions on his men, maintain the Board, reinstate the members of the previous cabinet who had been ousted in the coup, and remove those who had been imposed upon them. He also suggested that he assume the presidency of the Board; in this way, he would have almost all the power of a dictator, while maintaining appearances. He warned him that if the Cibao region had already elected Duarte as president, a dictator from Santo Domingo would not be recognized. Instead, with the more modest title of president of the Board, it would be easier for him to gain the people's support and maintain unity. Santana accepted the advice. That very night, back at home, he ordered a statement to be prepared rejecting the "dangerous office of dictator, so disastrous for those nations that have found themselves forced to try it." He read it on July 14 to a cheering audience, and in passing announced that he would call for elections for a Constituent Assembly to establish a permanent government. He closed his message with a call for unity under the triadic motto: "Indulgence, peace, union!"

On July 15, at the Borgellá Palace, he convened the Santo Domingo Junta to announce its new structure. That day, a conflict arose between Juan Isidro Pérez, a member of the Junta and a supporter of Duarte, and Juan Ruiz, a supporter of Santana. The argument escalated, threats were exchanged, and they nearly came to blows. Santana was upstairs and came down to try to mediate, but Pérez issued him a threat: "If Rome had a Brutus, Santo Domingo has one too." The allusion to Marcus Junius Brutus, one of Julius Caesar 's assassins, hinted at a possible plot against Santana. The general's officers, interpreting the reference to classical Rome as a clear death threat, rushed to the Plaza de Armas and raised the alarm: "To arms! To arms! They're assassinating Santana!" The entire population came running: some claimed "the general is dead" and others replied "no, nothing has happened to him, General Santana is alive." Pérez was saved from a lynching thanks to the intervention of Felipe Benicio Alfau, as the French consul took him into his consulate. Half an hour later, everything was back to normal.

The following day, July 16, Santana reorganized the Junta, installed himself as president, and retained the title of Supreme Chief. Joining the Junta were Tomás Bobadilla, Carlos Moreno de Hoyos (who had been expelled by the coup of June 9), Toribio Mañón, José Ramón Delorve, Manuel Cabral Bernal, Félix Mercenario, the moderate Duarte-supporting generals, Sánchez and Manuel Jimenes, and Colonel Lorenzo Santamaría as secretary. The Junta declared itself permanent until order was restored. Sánchez's tenure was short-lived: he refused to oppose Duarte and was imprisoned. Several others were also arrested, including Manuel María Valverde, José Díez Jiménez, Mariano Cangas, Buenaventura Freites, José Ramón Ortiz and officers Rafael Rodríguez, José del Carmen García and Cesáreo Prado, a certain Castro from El Seybo, Manuel Leguisamón, Ostres, Blanco, Muñoz, the Haitian "Dominicanophile" Félix Richiez and his two sons, Pedro Alejandro Pina, Vicente Celestino Duarte and Enrique his son, among others.

The new Junta set to work restoring order and the confidence of the Dominicans. On July 17, it ratified the Junta's decree of March 1 on slavery, which stated that "slavery is contrary to natural liberty, to the eternal principles of religion, reason, and sound politics," and that any Dominican who brought slaves into the country or participated in their purchase or sale "will be considered a pirate and punished with death." This occurred, among other things, because a Spaniard arrived claiming slaves who had escaped from the Captaincy General of Puerto Rico; the African Battalion, led by Santiago Basora, attempted to kill him, but Santana ordered his arrest and repatriation to Puerto Rico.

One week later, Tomás de Portes e Infante published a pastoral letter supporting the Junta, stating that disobeying Santana and the Junta was tantamount to offending God and threatening excommunication "any person who interfered in disrupting the provisions of our wise government." At the same time, the Junta called for elections for a Constituent Assembly, declared it would not cede territory to any other nation, refused to recognize Duarte as president, and reaffirmed that slavery would not be reinstated. At that time, General Duarte had support in the cities of Santiago de los Caballeros, Cotuí, Moca, Puerto Plata, San Francisco de Macorís, and Concepción de la Vega, but he lacked significant military forces, and his group was a minority. Mella proposed elections with Duarte as vice president and Santana as president, but Santana rejected the idea.

Finally, on July 28, Santana published a proclamation accusing Duarte of being "Colombian-lover" and criticizing him for not contributing to independence like the other patriots: "This new-style liberator was in Curaçao, calm and secure, when the Dominicans rose up; this new-style liberator has not contributed a single penny to the needs of the Republic; this new-style liberator strolled peacefully through the streets of the capital, while the good patriots, the true heroes, made all kinds of sacrifices and risked death in battle to give us a homeland and liberty.”
