= Dominican coup of 18 Brumaire =

1844 coup of the First Dominican Republic that ousted Tomás Bobadilla from office

Dominican coup of 18 Brumaire Golpe de Estado del "18 de brumario" dominicano
- Part of Dominican War of Independence
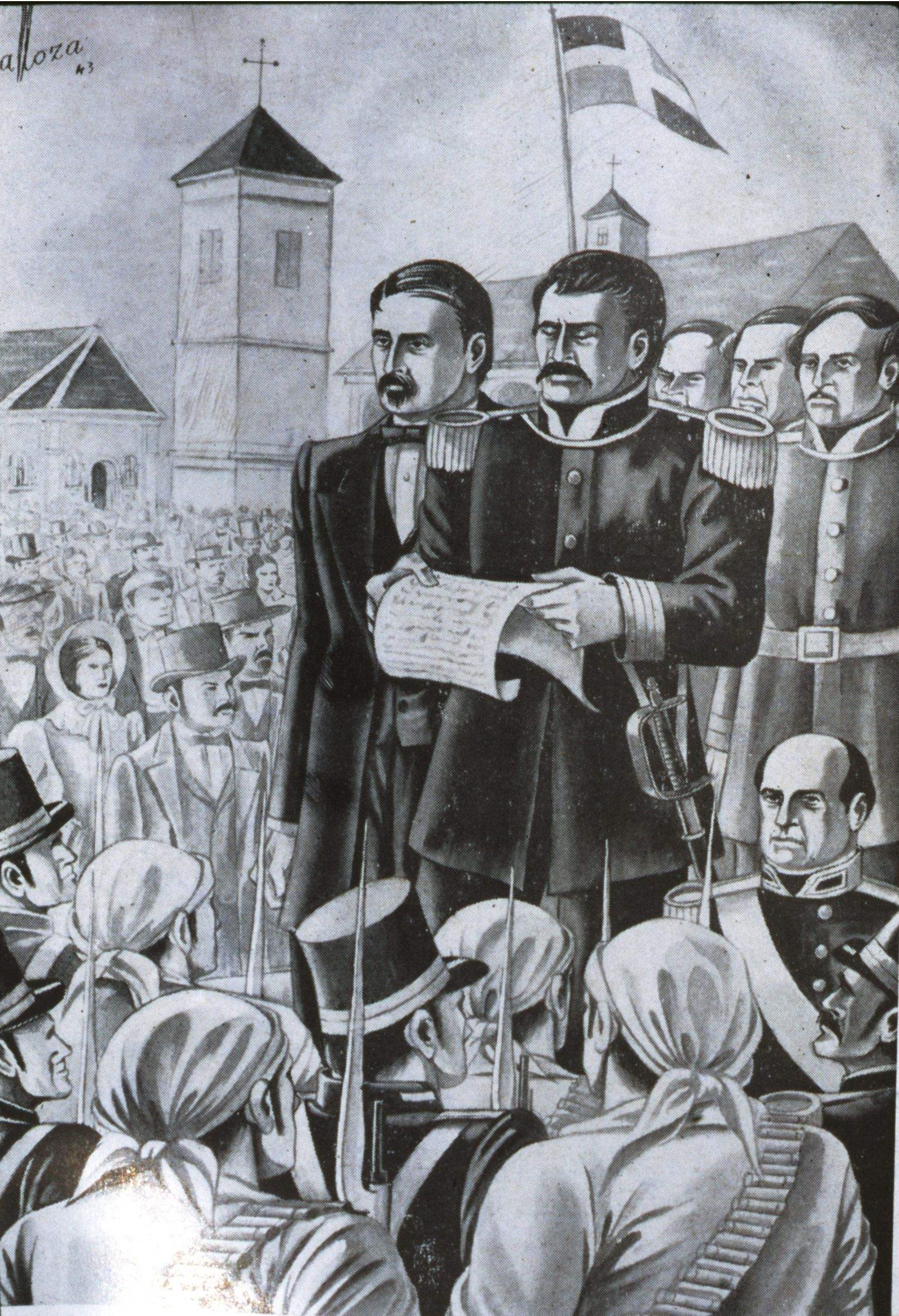
- Juan Pablo Duarte, leading figure of the Dominican 18 Brumaire, proclaimed as president by his supporter, Matías Ramón Mella.
- Date: June 9, 1844
- Location: Santo Domingo, Dominican Republic
- Type: Coup d'état
- Cause: Process of Levassuer Plan
- Organized by: Juan Pablo Duarte; José Joaquín Puello
- Participants: Juan Pablo Duarte; José Joaquín Puello; Santiago Basora; Manuel Jimenes; Matías Ramón Mella; Francisco del Rosario Sánchez; Pedro Alejandro Pina; Juan Isidro Pérez
- Outcome: Coup successful; Deposition of Tomás Bobadilla; Presidency restored to Francisco del Rosario Sánchez; Disruption of the Levassuer Plan

The Dominican coup of 18 Brumaire was a military coup d'état that took place on June 9, 1844, in the Dominican Republic. Orchestrated by liberal leaders of the Dominican War of Independence, this event constituted the earliest military coup d'état recorded in the history of the Dominican Republic.

In May 1844, after the defeat of Haitian president Charles Rivière-Hérard, political disputes arose between the independent Trinitarios and the ruling conservative government led by Tomás Bobadilla. Bobadilla, a staunch annexationist, favored the idea of the Dominican Republic becoming a French protectorate to protect the country from further Haitian aggression. While negotiations with France was still in motion, General Juan Pablo Duarte and a group of his followers began plotting a military coup to oust the sitting president and take power in the nascent Dominican Republic to confront the possible French invasion.

The coup d'état began at the Ozama Fortress, before itching its way to the headquarters of the Central Government Board, until eventually reaching Borgella Palace. With mounting support increasing, as well as the intervention of Manuel Jiménes, the mutineers forced Bobadilla to accept capitulation. The success of the coup led to the formation of a new cabinet, this time under the governance of another liberal leader, Francisco del Rosario Sánchez. New members were incorporated into the Board, including Juan Isidro Pérez and Pedro Alejandro Pina, both well-known supporters of Duarte. Unfortunately, this board was short lived, as only a month later, in July 1844, Sánchez was toppled in another military coup, this time led by the conservative caudillo, Pedro Santana.

Dominican historiography hold this event as an anti-French uprising in response to a proposed French protectorate. However, other critics view this uprising as an internal power struggle among factions that remained split on the topic of foreign protectorate annexation.

== Background ==
In the days following the proclamation of Dominican independence on February 27, 1844, the new nation was faced with immediate dangers. The Haitian government's refusal to recognize Dominican independence set of a series of military campaigns that threatened national sovereignty. Dominican historian, Frank Moya Pons, in Manual de Historia Dominicana, maintains that the then president, Charles Rivière-Hérard, determined not to lose the resources necessary to pay France the remainder of the indemnity debt it had at the time with the division of the island, set the Haitian army in motion on March 10 in an incursion that advanced to Azua, in the south of the country. The same would occur with another part of the Haitian army that would arrive at the end of the same month in Santiago in the north. Facing a powerful army that outnumbered the Dominicans by 8 to 1, many saw the numerical superiority of the Haitian army as a significant threat, and it was well known that the reason a third attempt at military occupation did not materialize immediately was due to Haiti's internal tensions, which led to Hérard's departure from power on May 3, 1844. (The subsequent governments of Philippe Guerrier, Jean-Louis Pierrot and Jean-Baptiste Riché would also become particularly brief).

Following Hérard 's defeat in the Battle of Azua, led by the Southern Expeditionary Army commanded by General Pedro Santana, the latter ordered the evacuation of Azua, which would later be occupied by Hérard's troops. On March 21, the board decided that in addition to Santana, there should be another senior officer who could replace him in case of absence and who would help him and cooperate with him in the defense of the country. Another general, Juan Pablo Duarte, was entrusted with this mission, leaving the next day accompanied by Colonel Pedro Alejandro Pina, chief of his General Staff.

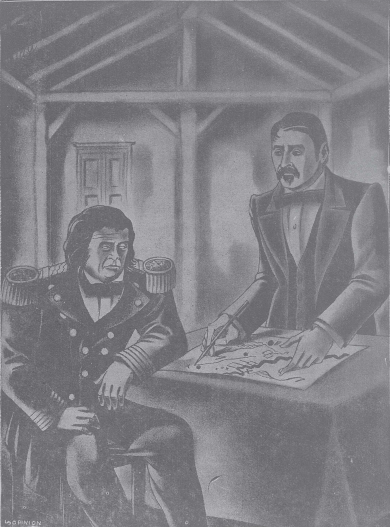
Meeting between Generals Juan Pablo Duarte and Pedro Santana.

On March 23, in Baní, the interview between Duarte and Santana took place. Duarte proposed to attack Hérard from the rear but Santana would reply saying that he would tell him his decision after consulting with the chiefs and officers who were under his command; these soldiers wanted to attack Hérard but without the presence of Duarte. On April 1, he would write to the board complaining that an attack against the Haitian troops was not launched, and three days later the board would dismiss him from his duties saying that his presence was necessary. On May 10, he would express to the board his desire to go to Santiago for the expedition that would cross the towns of Constanza and San Juan de la Maguana to attack Hérard from the rear. After five days, the board would reply to his request but would ask him to remain in his duties in the capital.

This military situation had a tense effect on the nascent Dominican Republic, thereby preventing the Central Government Board from focusing its efforts on the organic structuring of the State. Juan Bosch recalls in his work The Petite Bourgeoisie in the History of the Dominican Republic, this board, which had emerged in March 1844, had been unjustifiably headed by the conservative sector represented by Tomás Bobadilla, despite the fact that the Trinitarios had been the ones who conceived and put into action the independence plan, whose leader was Francisco del Rosario Sánchez. A second factor was then added – the internal conflict in the Central Government Board – which was influenced by the first factor already mentioned, since tensions increased due to the Trinitarios idea of maintaining independence without foreign interference and the conservative position continued to be that of turning to the French protectorate. This group was represented by Bobadilla, Santana and the archbishop of Santo Domingo, Tomás de Portes e Infante.

On May 26, in the city's Plaza de Armas (now Parque Colón), a public session of the board was held and was opened by a speech by Bobadilla, explaining that it was necessary for the republic to have a protectorate with France (a project that arose in December 1843 by the Dominican constituents in Puerto Príncipe and that the board had requested on March 8). The project supported by Bobadilla and Portes e Infante contemplated the perpetual cession of the Samaná peninsula to the France, which was opposed by Duarte, Manuel Jimenes, Jose Desiderio Valverde and many other liberal politicians; the majority of the board would reject the intended project.

The plan began at the Ozama Fortress in Santo Domingo, where they received support from a group of officers. The Trinitarios believed that Bobadilla and the other members of the Central Governing Board were guilty of conspiring against national sovereignty by maintaining negotiations aimed at obtaining the protection of the French. Sánchez foresaw that several of the conservatives could lose their lives in the movement and warned them of the scope of the plan so that they would have time to seek asylum in the French consulate, as several later did. Despite this act of peculiarity, it was agreed by the liberal generals that once the coup against the Central Government Board was consummated, Sánchez would be elected president in place of Bobadilla.

On May 28, 1844, the French monarchy's consul, Eustache Juchereau de Saint-Denys, sent the Junta another document with the terms in which the protection treaty was to be conceived, threatening to leave the country with his compatriots and ships. The new version of the protectorate project contained that France would give the country a loan of 3,000,000 pesos, receiving the Samaná Peninsula as a guarantee of payment of the sum. On this occasion, it was accepted and signed by the entire Junta, with the exception of Duarte; Duarte, upon refusing to sign the request for a protectorate, resigned from his positions as a member of the Junta and as commander of the department of Santo Domingo. On May 31, 56 officers signed a document addressed to the Board so that Brigadier Generals Sánchez, Matías Ramón Mella, and Antonio López Villanueva were promoted to the rank of division general, and while for José Joaquín Puello the rank of brigadier general was requested. The document also requests that Duarte be elevated to division general and that he be given the position of commander in chief of the Liberation Army:

“He is to be elevated to the rank of Major General, Commander in Chief of the Army, and we believe that this promotion is not unjust, since he has been the man who for many years has been constantly dedicated to the good of the country, and through societies, acquiring proselytes and publicly sowing the seeds of Separation, he has been the one who has contributed the most to forming that spirit of freedom and independence on our soil. In short, he has suffered a lot for the country, and his name was invoked immediately after the names God, Country and Liberty; he was always considered the Leader of the Revolution. It is true that he was not with us at the time of the pronouncement, but that proves that the persecution against him was even more fierce; he used the time of his expatriation to request aid for the country, but it was necessary that there be a pronouncement first, and he could not get what he wanted.”

The only one who was accepted for promotion was Puello, however some Seibanos together with friends and supporters of Santana, outraged by the requests, spoke out against them, causing the Junta to postpone the request of the Duartistas. On June 1, Duarte would rejoin the Junta, now headed by President José María Caminero, and sign the request for protection and recognition of independence by France. The new request for a French protectorate no longer included the cession of the Samaná Peninsula in perpetuity, replaced by a provisional French occupation of Samaná Bay if necessary.

== Coup d'état ==
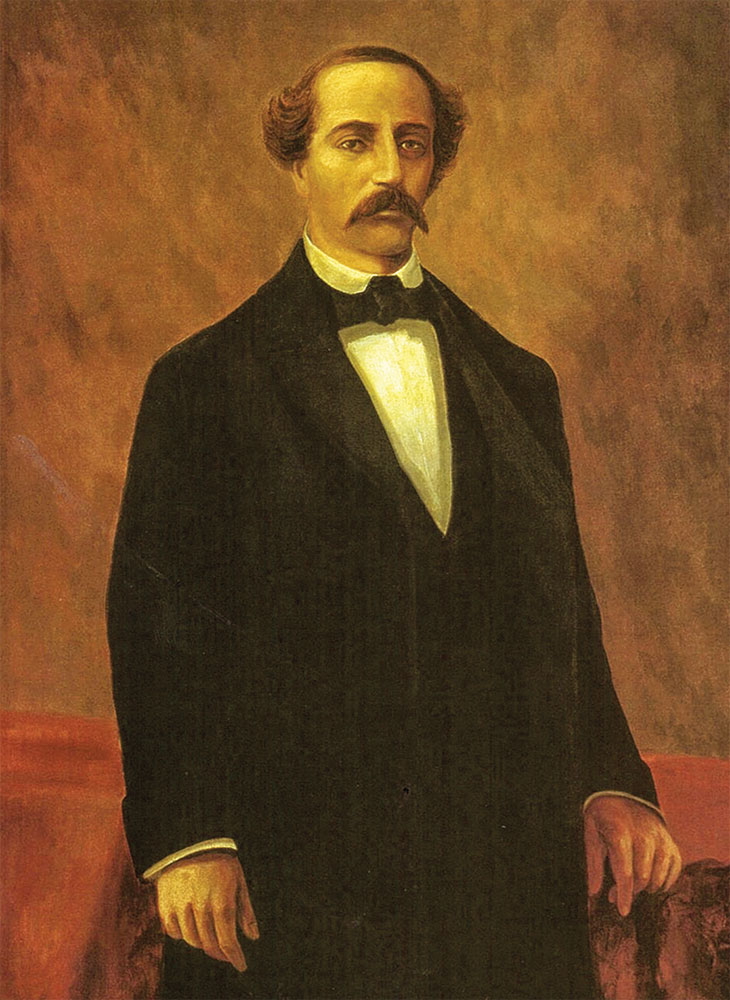
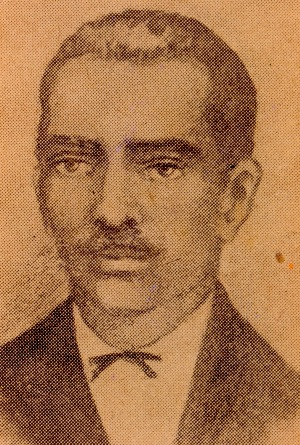
Juan Pablo Duarte (left) and José Joaquín Puello (right), the primary leaders of the military coup.

Secretly, Duarte and Puello's party formed a conspiracy to overthrow the Junta of José María Caminero. Duarte and Puello were supported by 150 to 200 officers who had been former slaves, including Santiago Basora, who became their entourage because they believed that their freedom was threatened by the whites after the Duartistas told them that the protectorate supporters wanted to sell the country to the French and restore slavery. The Duartistas were in a position to carry out the coup because Brigadier General Ramón Santana, feared by Puello's supporters, was in critical health, and in addition, the French warship Naiade was absent.

On the morning of June 31, Duarte gave a speech to the troops gathered at the Torre del Homenaje arsenal and the officers of his General Staff where he proclaimed Puello as brigadier general and, in turn, he proclaimed Duarte as inspector general of the Dominican troops; General Puello took the lead in the city and went to the Junta upon hearing the cries: "Down with Bobadilla! Down with Caminero ! Death to the traitors! Death to Delmonte, Javier Abreu, Francisco Ruiz and Báez!". The commander of the department of Santo Domingo, Manuel Jimenes, decided to appear before the Junta to obtain from it, voluntarily or by force, the ratification of the coup along with the expulsion of Caminero and Bobadilla, forcing them at the same time to sign a list of proscription. Duarte and Puello led about twenty officers to the Board and there, in the name of the people and the troops, imposed their appointments, obtaining, almost without resistance, the sanction of everything they had just done. Among other members of the Central Government Board, other liberal leaders such as Pedro Alejandro Pina, Manuel María Valverde and Juan Isidro Pérez were appointed. Duarte, who held the rank of general and member of the Junta, was appointed Military Commander of Santo Domingo, the main military garrison in the Dominican Republic.

According to Saint-Denys, in a letter he wrote to Guizot, the coup was chronicled with the following:

As for the rest, Mr. Minister, in my opinion, the coup d'état of June 9 is above all a struggle between individuals and private interests rather than a change of sympathy towards us. They wanted to overthrow Mr. Caminero and Mr. Bobadilla (the last two presidents of the Junta) only to take their positions and place themselves at the head of the country's political affairs at the time when negotiations with France are taking place and consequently benefit from this position so favorable to the interests of these so-called patriots. Everyone here, as in the north, wants the protectorate and the intervention of France. Our enemies themselves share this way of seeing things, if they were sure that this would not in any way harm their projects of progress and their personal positions. Interest is the only motive for all these dissidences.

== Aftermath ==
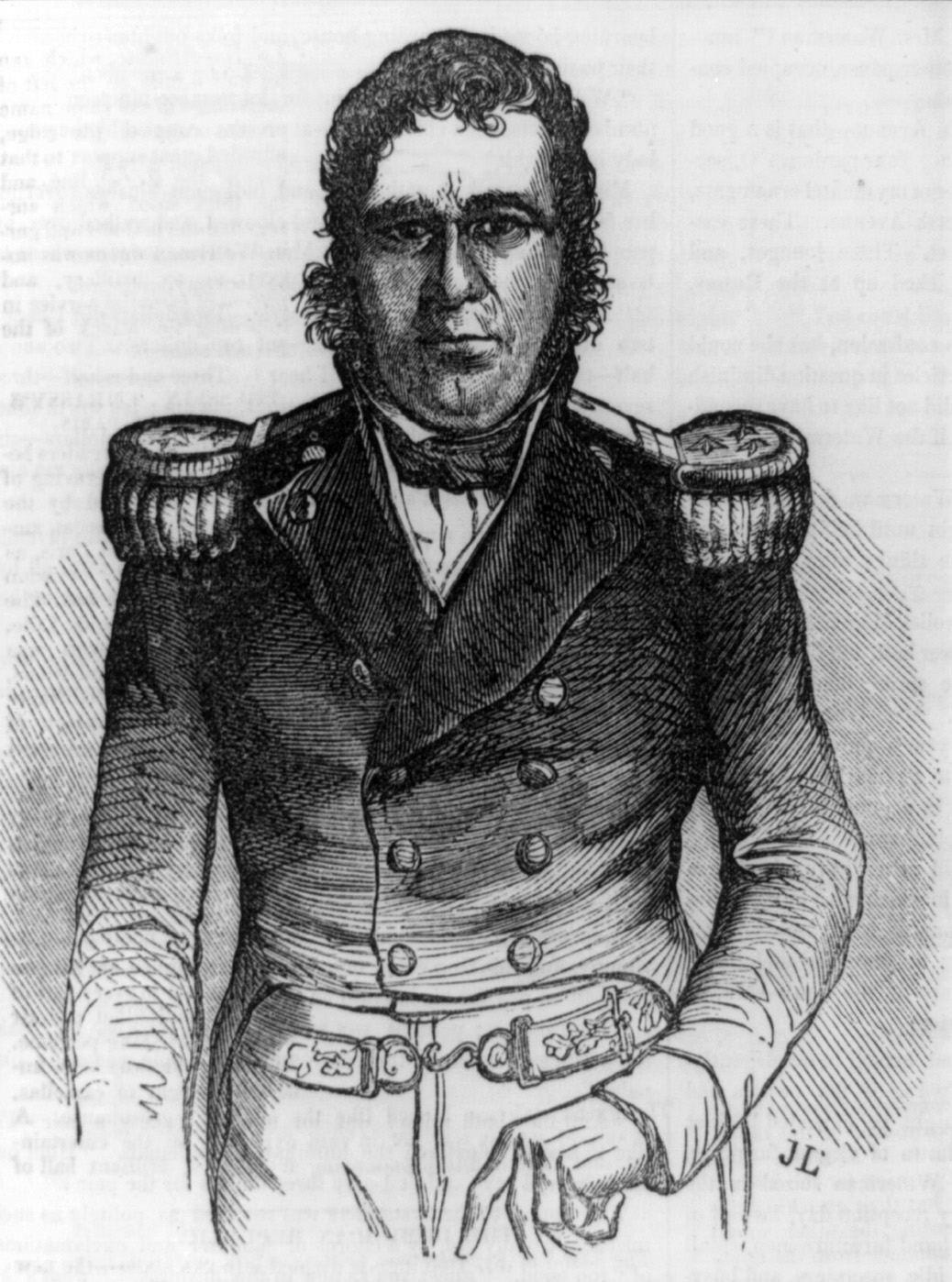
Pedro Santana, who did not accept the events of the military coup, took advantage of the disagreements between the leading Trinitarios to seize control of the government.

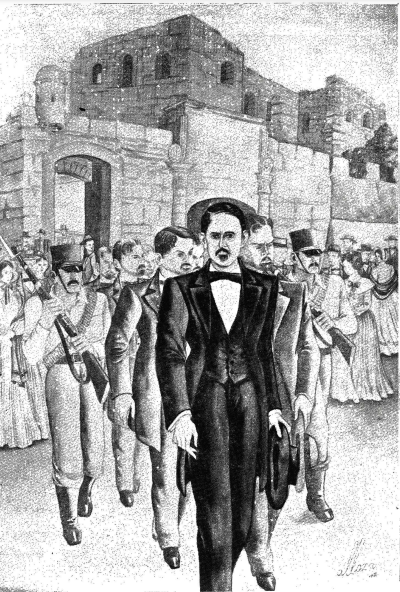
Unwilling to throw the country into civil war, Juan Pablo Duarte reluctantly accepted to go into exile.

The Junta, now led by President Sánchez, acting on a letter from the commander-in-chief of the department of Santiago, Mella sent Duarte to the Cibao on June 18 to intervene in the internal discord and restore peace. On June 31, he made his presence felt in the city of Santiago. On July 4, Mella proclaimed Duarte as president of the republic, ignoring the authority of the Junta. Mella would communicate in a letter to Sánchez: "My desired one has arrived and I will return him to you as President of the Dominican Republic." Sánchez disapproved of the actions of Mella and of the now president Duarte. Sánchez would express to Mella: "the Febreristas should not give the sad example of such tumultuous exaltations, as with this anarchy would be enthroned." The Duartistas who had previously attacked General José María Imbert managed to attract him, and the cities of Moca and La Vega recognized Duarte as president of the nation.

On July 11, Duarte made his appearance in the city of Puerto Plata, where he was also acclaimed as president, and where he gave a selfless speech in which he expressed his gratitude towards the people of Puerto Plata and his desire to see the population free, happy and at peace:

You have given me unequivocal proof of your love, and my grateful heart must give you one of gratitude. It is as ardent as the vows I make for your happiness. Be happy, children of Puerto Plata, and my heart will be satisfied even if I am exonerated from the command you want me to obtain; but be fair first, if you want to be happy. That is the first duty of man; and be united, and thus you will extinguish the torch of discord and defeat your enemies, and the country will be free and safe. I will obtain the greatest reward, the only one I aspire to, when I see you free, happy, independent and peaceful.

Mella later addressed the Junta to regret the silence regarding his requests for help to remedy the evils that threatened him. Mella decided to name a commission composed of Colonel Domingo Mallol and Commander Juan Luis Franco Bidó, who would represent the Cibao and present to the Junta the needs and demands of the region, as well as the proclamation of Duarte as president.

However, the Cibao was unaware of the events that occurred in the capital. On July 12, 1844, the southern forces commanded by Santana entered the capital, where the head of the garrison, José Joaquín Puello, offered no resistance, allowing Santana to enter the city and seize power. He was named Supreme Chief by the people and the Army itself. This changed the organization of the Board, which was now headed by Santana and had the consent of Sánchez, who would not remain long with President Santana, who preceded to dismiss and exile many of the liberal leaders from the island, including Sánchez, Mella, and Duarte.

France, which had once previously controlled the Dominican Republic until being ousted in an uprising in 1809, would forever retract its attempts to regain control on the island following the success of the military coup. France, along with the United Kingdom, would later go on to recognize the Dominican Republic as a sovereign country in 1850.

== Historiography ==
Despite its brief success, this coup was described as an example of anti-imperialism that solidified the revolutionary ideals of the Dominican War of Independence. Historian Hugo Tolentino Dipp, in his book Introduction to Dominican Social History, wrote of the military coup:

the June 9 movement was, authentically, of the same lineage that characterizes the February 27 movement. A heroic act, certainly carried out without having the force capable of backing it up and making it viable, but undoubtedly permeated with the deepest nationalist feelings and the greatest repudiation of any attempt to alienate the national territory.

This coup d'état, which permanently ended the French threat to Dominican independence, was called by Saint-Denys as the 18 Dominican Brumaire, named after the 18 Brumaire, a bloodless coup d'état led by Napoleon Bonaparte on November 9, 1799, which concluded the French Revolution. Although, Saint-Denys, in a letter of July 1, 1844, addressed to the Minister of Foreign Affairs of France, François Guizot, would communicate that: "Although apparently directed against France, the coup d'état of the 9th has in no way changed my position here."

This constitutes a third element to be taken into account in order to understand the convulsions of the so-called “first year of the homeland.”

== See also ==
- Dominican War of Independence
- Juan Pablo Duarte
- José Joaquín Puello
