= Santiago Basora =

Dominican revolutionary leader

Santiago Basora (fl. 1840s) was a Dominican revolutionary leader in the Dominican War of Independence. Basora, a former slave himself, was determined that the new independent government would uphold its promise that slavery would never return to the Dominican Republic. He a revolt in Monte Grande before being confronted by independence leaders Tomás Bobadilla and Manuel Jimenes, who ensured him that slavery was forever abolished.

== Origins ==
He was born in Guinea in West Africa and was baptized by a Portuguese priest in Santo Domingo with the surname Basora upon arrival. He was known to have had the utmost respect of the colored class of the now Dominican Republic. A staunch anti-slavery activist, his stance against the institution would serve as a key element that allowed the Trinitarios to win over support from the colored class.

During the Haitian regime in eastern Hispaniola, Basora was the captain of the African battalion, a body of black soldiers, many of whom, like Basora, were former slaves. These forces, camped in Pajarito, (present-day Villa Duarte), was initially indecisive about the events of the time, since a large part of the population was committed to the patriots.

== Dominican War of Independence ==
On March 1, 1844, two days after the proclamation of Dominican independence by the Trinitarios at Puerta del Conde, Battalion Commander Esteban Pou revealed suspicion about an alleged rumor that the leading government would reimpose slavery. They devised a plan to rebel in response to this, but the captains had been extracted by Tomás Bobadilla and Manuel Jimenes, whom were commissioned by President Francisco del Rosario Sánchez to confront them. The rebels were assured that slavery would never return to the nation, and were issued a pardon by Bobadilla. Basara's company was made up of inhabitants of Monte Grande, who, once the Dominican War of Independence had begun, that company and others from the same region were commanded by Basora himself. His forces was said to have provided services to the Southern line. This column, called The African Battalion, was soon left in the Capital while the improvised columns left for the South under the command of Pedro Santana.

The elements of that unit military personnel were always touched by suspicion, fearful that the issue of racial prejudice and its consequences would be reborn. They were well treated, however, even regarding the new homeland they came to feel satisfied and not to distrust the spirit of equality prevailing among the Dominicans. But on the occasion of the dispute of predominance over the leadership of the government, in which the question of a protectorate under France was discussed. General Juan Pablo Duarte and his supporters won the collaboration of Basora, who was convinced that the return of slavery was inevitable with the impending French invasion. With this, Duarte had successfully managed to disrupt the protectorate project and dismiss the culprits from office.

His military, during the days of confusion and lack of personal guarantee prevailing in the city after the 18 Dominican Brumaire of June 9, 1844, demonstrated themselves as provocateurs and determined to uphold the freedom and equality of all Dominicans by any means necessary. However, the triumphant return of Santana commanding his army that had just been formed fighting in the fields of the South, put an end to the conceit of the African Battalion. This caused the repressed Basora and his troops to express doubt to the new order that had now materialed in the government.

However, other conflicts soon embroiled that threatened the principles upheld within the independent state. A Spaniard from Puerto Rico, who himself was a slave owner, came to the country to reclaim nine of his slaves, who, according to him, had escaped to the Dominican Republic, and were believed to have been part of the African Battalion. Seemingly unaware that the Dominican territory was now an independent state, he publicly dedicated himself to stating the purpose of his arrival, which soon reached the ears of the soldiers of the battalion. Enraged, Basora and his troops took to the streets to hunt down the man. The Spaniard was able to avoid being caught by taking refuge in a family home, which was ultimately surrounded by his pursuers, who were prepared to take action against him. However, the intervention of General Santana prevented such an outcome. Accompanied by his General Staff, the Spaniard was taken to the Ozama Fortress, from where he was secretly taken out to be put on board a ship. After this, Santana often looked for a pretext to detach Basora to the fields of the South; but days of truce followed one another, and he was brought to the plaza again, as less dangerous than leaving him quartered in that vast and sparsely populated region.

By 1847, hostilities between the black battalion and the ruling conservative cabinet intensified. When the imprisonment and trial of Minister José Joaquín Puello took place, the government took the necessary precautions, promptly sending infantry and cavalry troops to the city from Baní and El Seibo, and mobilizing the Civic Guard, formed in front of the arsenal to prevent reprisals from his supporters. The African Battalion, while apparently prepared to act, was ultimately repressed from taking action, while the entire city, with its traffic of armed people, was already in full mobilization.

Not much is known about their activities following the death of Puello, but it is known that they took part in repelling the invasion of Faustin Soulouque in April 1849. Afterwards, Basora, still a supporter of the liberal president, Manuel Jimenes, was expelled from the country.

== Historiagraphy ==
The actions of Santiago Basora represented one of the many chapters in the Dominican history regarding the issue of slavery.

== See also ==
- José Joaquín Puello
- Manuel Jimenes
- Tomás Bobadilla
