= José María Caminero =

Dominican conservative politician (1782–1853)

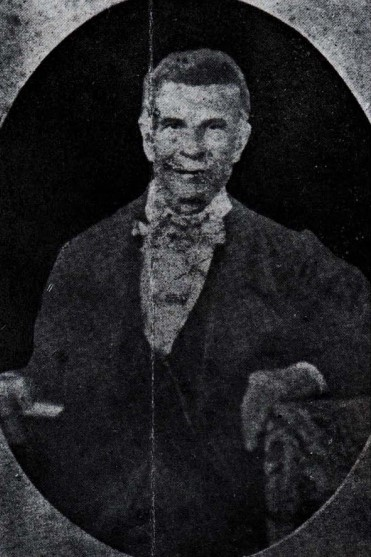
- Photograph of Caminero c. 1840s
- Born: 1782; Santiago de Cuba, Cuba
- Died: January 2, 1853 (aged 71); Santo Domingo, Dominican Republic
- Occupations: Revolutionary, Writer and politician
- Spouse: Maria Guadalupe Heredia

José María Caminero y Ferrer (1782 – January 2, 1853) was a lawyer and politician from the Dominican Republic. He played a significant role in the different political processes that occurred on the island from the early independence movement of José Núñez de Cáceres, the Haitian occupation and the independent Dominican governments until his death in 1853.

== Birth and early years ==
Map of the island of Hispaniola (1820).

José María Caminero y Ferrer was born in the city of Santiago de Cuba, Cuba, in 1782.

Before arriving on the island of Hispaniola, José María Caminero married María Guadalupe Heredia in his hometown. She is believed to be the sister of the French poet José María de Heredia.

From his early years, he demonstrated his ability as an interpreter and translator of from French to Spanish before the courts of Santiago de Cuba, a position he held from 1806 to 1809. Later, he served as a public interpreter for the Government in the Captaincy General of Santo Domingo in 1818.

He was elected deputy for Santo Domingo in the Chamber of Commons of Haiti, a position he held from 1822 to 1827, during the years of Haitian domination. Caminero also participated in commissions of inquiry in the years 1822 and 1842. By 1828, at the age of 39, he held the position of Receiver of the Register and Interpreter. He was also a prominent member of the Freemasonry section, an influential organization of the time. In 1834, José Caminero assumed an important role as Port Interpreter of Santo Domingo, thus consolidating his presence in the port area of the city. However, his career would take a momentous turn on March 9, 1835, when Jean-Pierre Boyer appointed him Government Commissioner near the Civil Court of the city of Santo Domingo.

== Dominican independence ==
Not only did he stand out in the governmental sphere, but Caminero was a fervent supporter of the separatist movement and signed the Manifesto of January 16, 1844, joining the country's independence process. In addition, he joined the separatist movement of the Trinitarios in Santo Domingo and acted as Delegate of the Provisional Governing Board before the Haitian general Henri Etienne Desgrotte for the capitulation of Santo Domingo.

On March 1, 1844, he joined the Central Government Board and on June 1 of that same year, he presided over the Board. At that time, he requested protection and recognition of independence by France. However, secretly, Juan Pablo Duarte and José Joaquín Puello, two liberal Generals, conspired to stage a coup d'état and overthrow the Board presided over by Caminero. On June 9, 1844, Duarte and Puello led the 18 Dominican Brumaire that overthrew Caminero. Following this, the arrest of Caminero and Tomás Bobadilla, among others, was ordered, although they managed to escape thanks to the warning given to them by Francisco del Rosario Sánchez and both took refuge in the house of the French consul. On July 13, a counter-coup led by General Pedro Santana reinstated the Board members who had been expelled by the coup of June 9.

On November 6, 1844, as secretary of the Constituent Congress, Caminero participated in the drafting of the country's first political Constitution.

== Diplomatic career ==
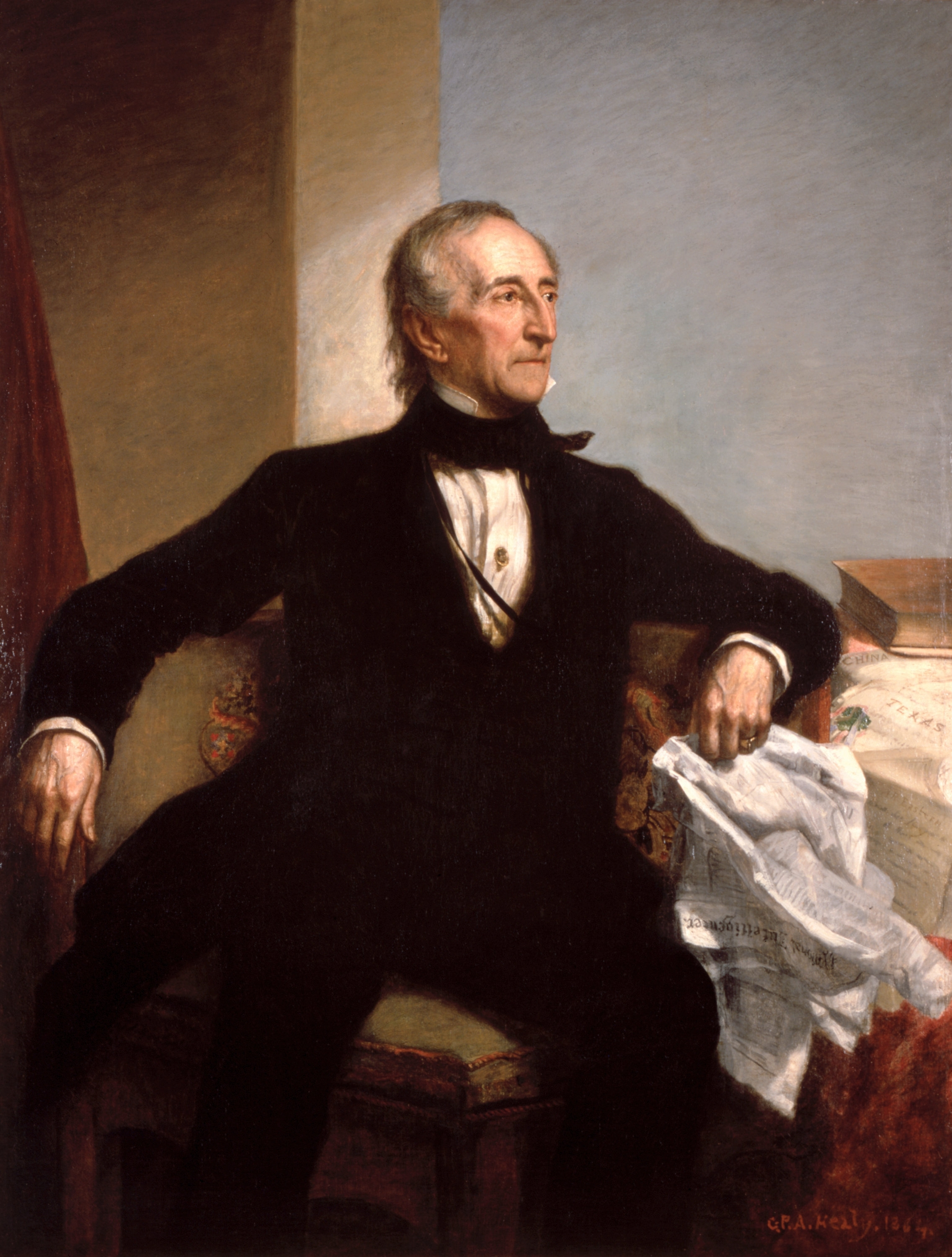
As the war against Haiti loomed on, Caminero attempted to forge relations with powers like the United States under John Tyler, whom he tried to persuade to recognize Dominican independence.

In 1844, the Dominican Republic was faced with the challenge of obtaining international recognition of its newly proclaimed independence. At this important juncture, President Santana made the decision to appoint Caminero to his most relevant role as commissioner and public envoy to the Government of the United States of America. Caminero's mission, which left for Washington, D.C. on December 5, 1844, was to establish relations of friendship, alliance, and trade with all the great nations, especially with the one that had been a pioneer in the fight for freedom in America.

On January 6, 1845, Caminero was received by Secretary of State John C. Calhoun and fulfilled his mission by delivering a copy of the Dominican Constitution and a letter to the President of the United States, John Tyler, formally requesting recognition of Dominican independence. However, at that time, the international agenda of the United States was not focused on establishing diplomatic relations with countries in Spanish America, as its efforts were focused on completing territorial expansion to the West. Despite Caminero's efforts and the favorable interest shown by President Tyler, the latter decided to send a special commissioner, John Hogan, to Santo Domingo to gather detailed information about the country. Hogan's mission, carried out in 1845, resulted in an exhaustive report that assessed the political, economic, and military situation of the Dominican Republic, as well as the opinion of the population regarding the United States. Despite the interest shown by the administrations of Tyler and later James K. Polk, the recognition of Dominican independence by the United States would take many years to materialize. The American government, aware of its interests in the Caribbean, had to ensure that recognizing Dominican independence was beneficial and convenient for its foreign policies.

== Later career ==
Caminero also had a distinguished career in the judicial field and held important positions in the Dominican government. He held various ministerial positions, including Minister of Foreign Affairs and Minister of Finance and Commerce, during the administrations of Santana and Manuel Jimenes. In addition to his distinguished career in the political arena, Caminero also left his mark in the judicial field. In 1847, he stood out as Public Prosecutor of the Supreme Court of Justice and participated as a public prosecutor in the special court that tried the Puello brothers.

During the invasion of Faustin Soulouque, the Battle of Las Carreras took place at the Caminero estate on April 21, 1849.

As plenipotentiary, he signed together with Juan Esteban Aybar and Ricardo Miura the treaty of friendship, commerce and navigation with France on May 8, 1852.

== Death ==
He died in the Dominican capital of Santo Domingo on January 2, 1853. He was 71 years old.

== See also ==
- Tomás Bobadilla
- Juan Pablo Duarte
- José Joaquín Puello
- John Tyler
