= Basora =

Basora is a surname. Notable people with the surname include:

- Adrian A. Basora (born 1938), American diplomat
- Estanislau Basora (1926–2012), Spanish football player

== See also ==
Basra, for which Basora is the Spanish form
