= Dominican–French Treaty (1848) =

1848 diplomatic treaty between Dominican Republic and the Kingdom of France

Tratado de Reconocimiento, Paz, Amistad, Comercio y Navegación
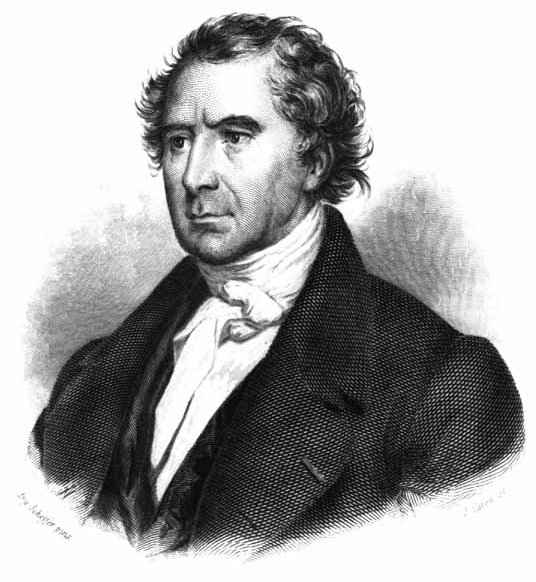
- François Arago, president of the French Executive Commission of 1848
- Type: Diplomatic recognition and Trade agreement
- Signed: May 14, 1848
- Location: Santo Domingo, Dominican Republic
- Effective: 1848
- Parties: Dominican Republic; Kingdom of France
- Language: Spanish, French

The Treaty of Recognition, Peace, Friendship, Commerce, and Navigation, or simply the Dominican–French Treaty (1848), was a bilateral diplomatic agreement signed on May 14, 1848, between the Dominican Republic and the Kingdom of France. Through this legal instrument, France formally recognized the existence of the Dominican Republic as a sovereign and independent nation. This treaty served as a fundamental pillar for 19th-century Dominican diplomacy, as France was one of the dominant global powers of the era.

== Background ==
The division of the island of Hispaniola, which gave rise to the two current nations, was fundamentally caused by the Osorio Devastations (1605–1606). These forced depopulations in the northern and western parts of the island allowed French adventurers and settlers to gradually establish themselves in the abandoned territories, which eventually led to the colony of Saint-Domingue and, later, the state of Haiti.

Following the proclamation of Dominican independence on February 27, 1844, the new state required recognition from European powers to halt Haitian reconquest attempts and ensure its economic viability. France, due to its historical relationship with the territory and its commercial interests in the Caribbean, was a key actor in this process.

== Negotiations ==
Dominican diplomatic missions, led by figures such as Buenaventura Báez, worked intensively in Paris to demonstrate the stability of the Dominican government and the irreversibility of its separation from Haiti. The negotiations culminated in Santo Domingo with the signing of the treaty. The Dominican government sought not only recognition but also clauses for commercial and diplomatic protection.

== Key points of the treaty ==
The treaty was structured into several articles that established the basis of Franco-Dominican relations:

- Recognition of Sovereignty: France admitted the Dominican Republic as a free and sovereign State, renouncing any previous claims of sovereignty.
- "Most Favored Nation" Treatment: It guaranteed that any commercial advantage granted to a third country would automatically be applied to the counterpart.
- Freedom of Navigation and Trade: It facilitated the exchange of primary products such as tobacco, sugar, and precious woods (such as mahogany), which were the main engines of the Dominican economy.

== Historical significance ==
The ratification of this agreement allowed the Dominican Republic to emerge from international isolation. French recognition, combined with that of the United Kingdom, forced Haiti to reconsider its strategy of total war, as it now faced a nation that held the legal backing of transatlantic powers.

== See also ==
- History of the Dominican Republic
- Foreign relations of the Dominican Republic
- France–Dominican Republic relations
