= Fortaleza Ozama =

UNESCO World Heritage Site
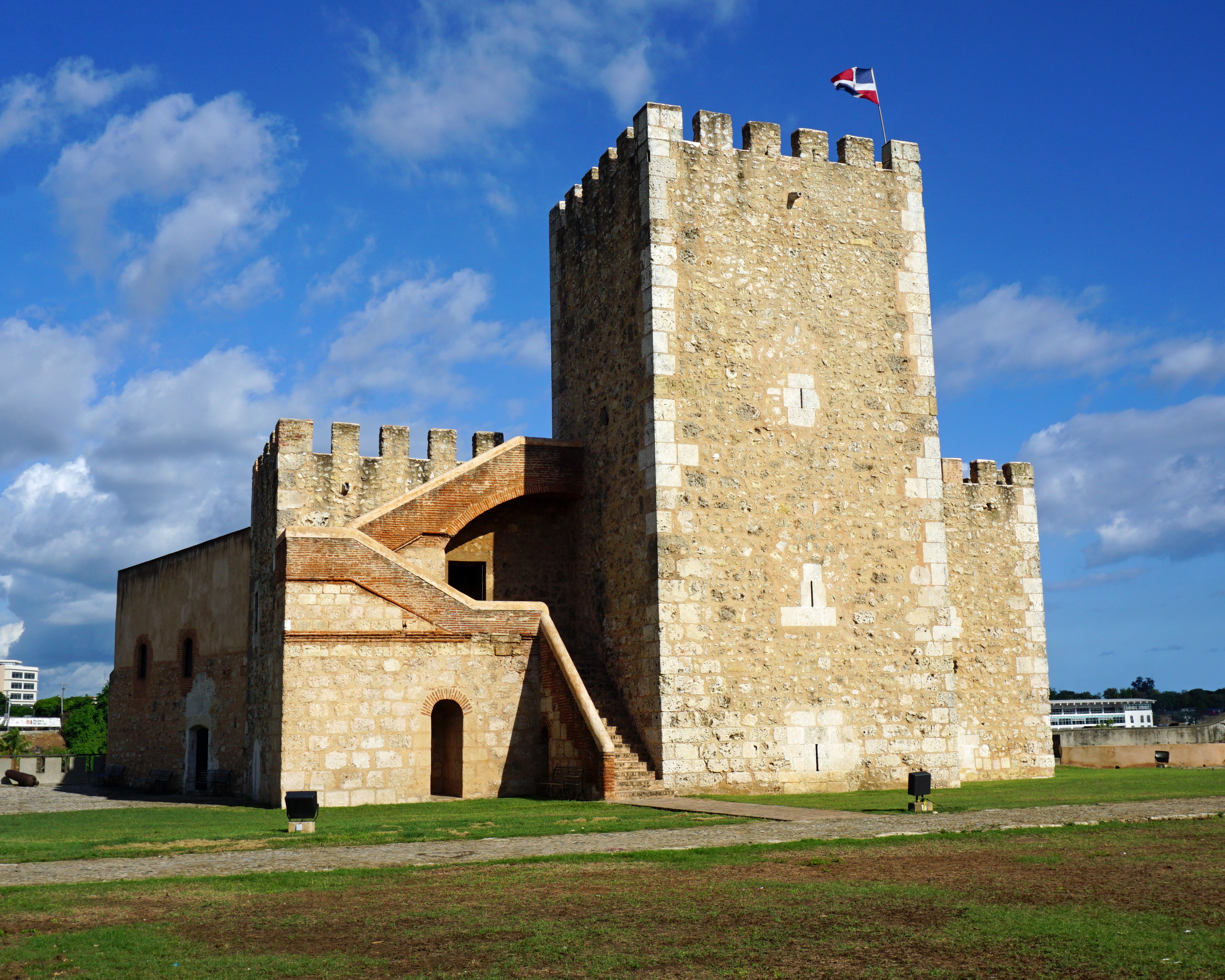
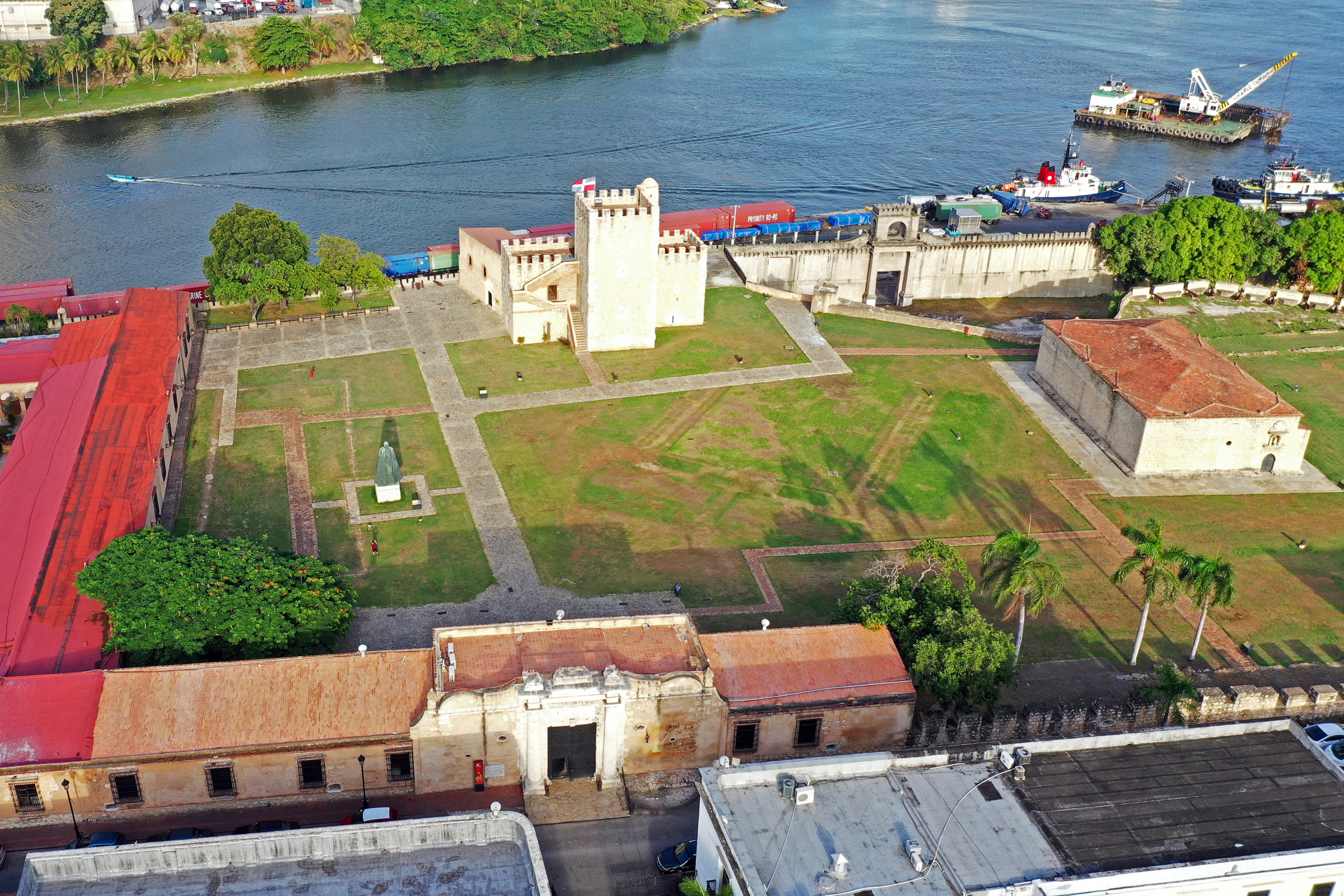
- Ozama Fortress

- Location within the Dominican Republic
- Location: Santo Domingo, Dominican Republic
- Part of: Colonial City of Santo Domingo
- Criteria: Cultural: (ii), (iv), (vi)
- Reference: 526
- Inscription: 1990 (14th Session)
- Coordinates: 18°28′24″N 69°52′54″W

The Ozama Fortress (Spanish: Fortaleza Ozama), also formerly known as the city wall's Homage tower, is one of the surviving sections of the Walls of Santo Domingo, which is recognized by UNESCO as being the oldest military construction of European origin in the Americas. It was built between 1502–1508 by the Spanish at the entrance to Santo Domingo's Ciudad Colonial, Dominican Republic, and overlooking the Ozama River. Named after this river, the fortress, also is referred to as "La Fortaleza" or "The Fortress". It was declared by UNESCO as a World Heritage Site, together with the other historical monuments of the Ciudad Colonial.

The Ozama Fortress is part of the Colonial City of Santo Domingo. According to historians and architects, the construction of this monument lasted from 1502 to 1508, which was started by Governor Nicolás Ovando. During the 16th century, the 18-meter high tower was the highest European-built construction of the Americas.

The construction of this fortress is designed in the form of a stone castle and still preserves its original architecture. Inside the fortress there are tunnels and dungeons where the prisoners were locked up, Christopher Columbus himself, one of the most important figures in the history of the Americas, was imprisoned in the fortress.

In 1938, the riverside of the Ozama fortress was enclosed by a tall, thin, gray, reinforced concrete wall, equipped with parapets and bartizans to look like a colonial fortification, as part of the modernization of the Port of Santo Domingo under the leadership of Dominican dictator Rafael Trujillo.

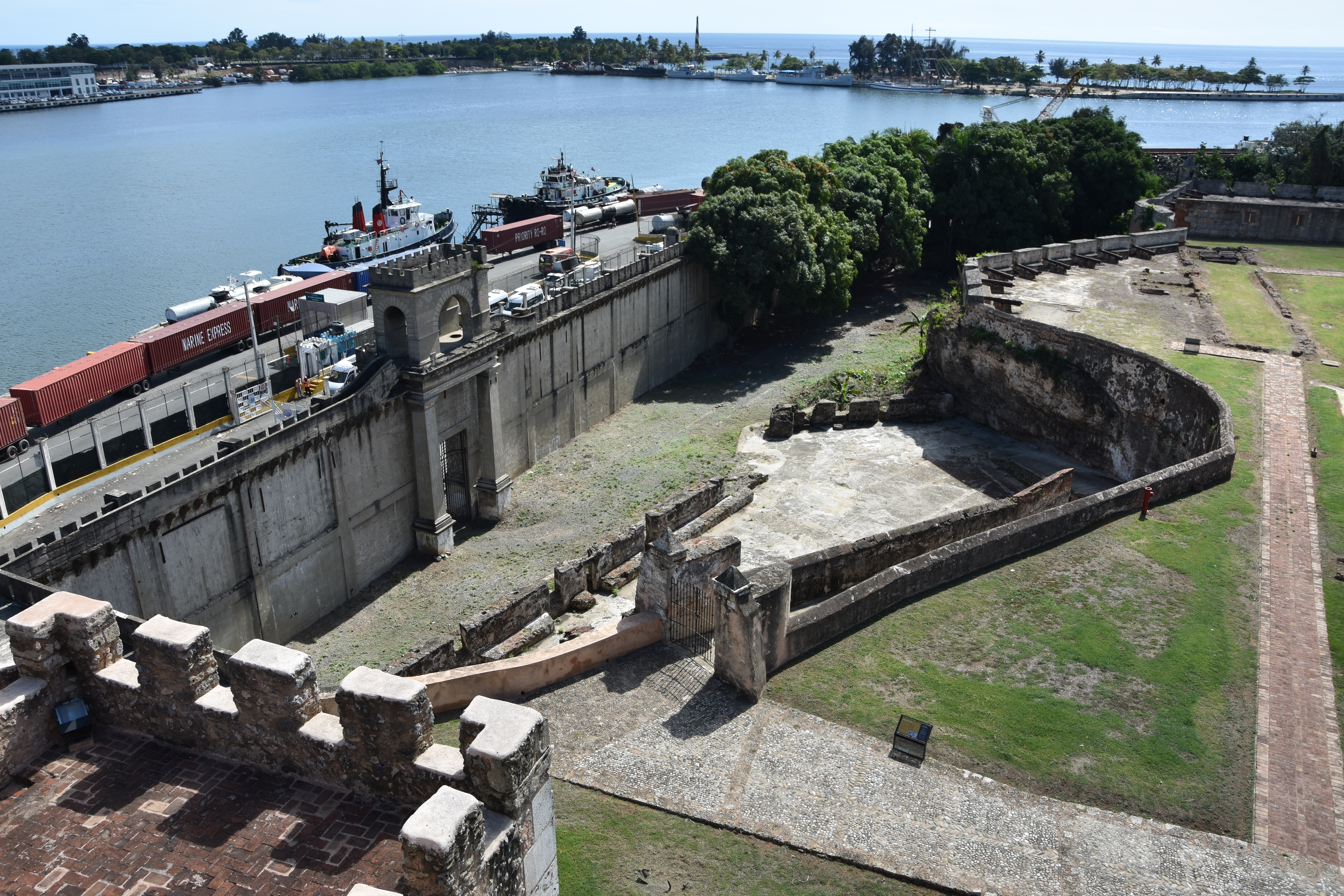
Riverside of the Ozama fortress showing the original structure behind the modern wall built in 1938

== History ==
Constructed in a medieval architectural style, the Tower of Homage (Spanish: Torre del Homenaje) stands in the center of the grounds. The castle was designed to guard the entrance to the port of Santo Domingo and defend the city from seaborne enemies. The main objective of this construction was to protect the city from the various attacks of the English, French and Dutch pirates and conquerors.

Coral stones extracted from the sea were used for construction. Black and Taino slaves worked for the construction of the fortress. Nicolás de Ovando, founder of Santo Domingo, personally chose the lot of the construction when it was completed in 1505. The fortress was considered the Axis of the Conquest by the Spaniards once they had explored the whole island.

The architect of the building was the Spaniard Gómez Garcia de Varela. The construction started with the main tower, then the shooting platforms, then the main defensive fort. The Fortaleza was seized by the pirate Sir Francis Drake in 1586. The entrance gate on Calle Damas was originally built in 1608, known as the Prevention Gate. In 1787, the gated entrance was replaced by the actual one, the Carlos III gate.

Pirates and politicians were usually jailed in the fortress. During the eighteen & 19 century, the ex-presidents Jacinto Peynado and Horacio Vásquez did some time in the prison. In 1965, the Fortaleza ceased to serve as a prison and became a public building.

In 1965, in the month of April, the Patriotic War broke out, led by a group of soldiers and the people, electing Colonel Francisco Caamano as Constitutional President of the Republic on May 4. During the Government of Colonel Francisco Alberto Caamaño Deño, the Ozama Fortress ceased to be a military compound by Law No. 11 of President Caamaño, being converted into a public place, with the name of Plaza de la Constitución, Law contained in the Official Gazette No. 4 of your Government. There are bullets holes in the doors dating from 1965, due to the fighting in the Dominican Civil War.

== Description ==
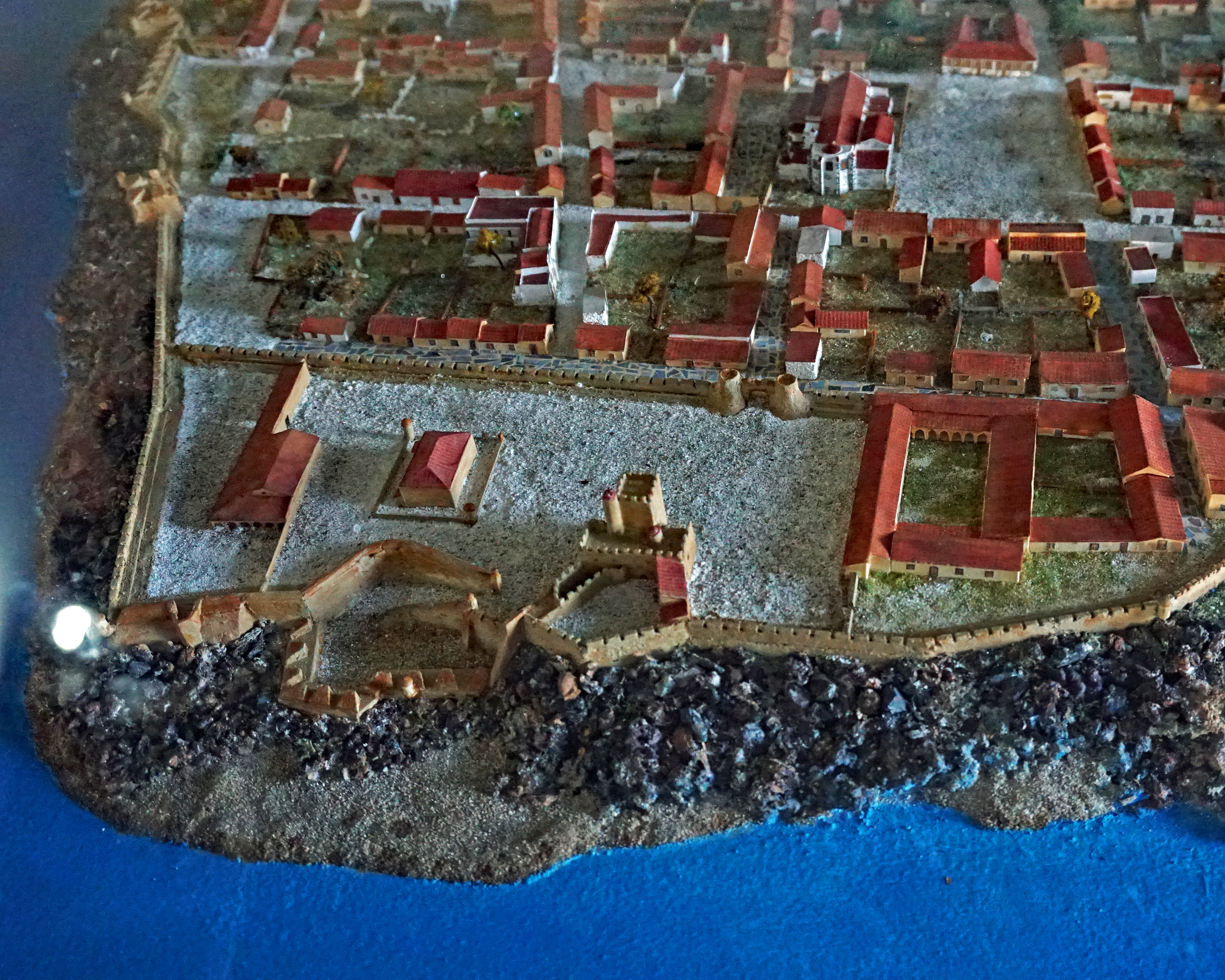
The length of the city walls in 1785. The Ozama Fortress is one of the surviving sections. Model exhibits at the Museo de las Casas Reales in Santo Domingo

The Fortaleza is located at the end of Las Damas Street. Its name is due to its location near the Ozama River.

The statue in front of the building depicts Gonzalo Fernández de Oviedo y Valdés, governor of the fortress from 1533 to 1557, and author of Historia General y Natural de las Indias. The statue was imported from Salamanca, Spain in 1977, and was made by the artist Joaquín Vaquero Turcio

The central tower of the building is 18-meter high, with walls 2-meter thick. The fortified walls around the building are 3-meter thick, except on the river-side where the walls are 1-meter thick. The cement holding the stone walls together is a mixture of gypsum, clay, lime and the blood of animals.

== Notable prisoners ==
- Juan Nepomuceno Ravelo (1843), Trinitario
- Félix Mercenario (1843), Trinitario
- Pedro Pablo de Bonilla (1843), ex-president of Supreme Court of the Dominican Republic
- Narciso Sánchez Ramón (1843), father of Francisco del Rosario Sánchez
- Luis Betances (1843), Trinitario
- José María Leyba Ramírez (1843), Trinitario
- Manuel Leguizamón (1843), Trinitario
- Silvano Pujol (1843), former secretary of the Central Government Board
- Manuel José Machado (1843), Trinitario
- Pedro Valverde y Lara (1843), Trinitario
- Gabriel José de Luna (1843), Trinitario
- Juan Pablo Duarte (1844), founder of the Dominican Republic
- Francisco del Rosario Sánchez (1844), former president of the Dominican Republic
- Matías Ramón Mella (1844), revolutionary and military general
- Juan Isidro Pérez (1844), member and co-founder of the secret society La Trinitaria
- María Trinidad Sánchez (1845), was a Dominican separatist
- Andrés Sánchez (1845), Trinitario
- Antonio Duvergé (1849), military general
- Dionisio Valerio de Moya (1866)
- Gregorio Urbano Gilbert, guerrilla fighter
- Alejandro Woss y Gil, former president
- Rafael Alburquerque, former vice president
- Eduardo Read Barreras
- Antinoe Fiallo Rodríguez
- Rafael Leonidas Aybar Astacio
- Carlos Parahoy (1888)
- Pablo Báez Lavastida (1889) ex judge of the Supreme Court of Justice
- Eusebio Manzueta (1873)
- Cnel Basilio Gavilán (1873).
- Eugenio Miches (1868-1874)
- Bernabé Sandoval (1868-1874)
- Eugenio Generoso de Marchena(1892)
- Ramón Castillo (1889)
- José Estay (1889)
- Remigio Zayas (1903)
- Juan de la Cruz Rojas (1903)
- Leopoldo Espaillat a Polín (1903)
- Andrés Navarro Castro(1903)
- Manuel de Jesús Gómez a Pelén (1903)
- Benito Moción (1865)
- Manuel Rodríguez (1867)
- Carlos Báez (1867), brother of Buenaventura Báez
- Luis Tejera Bonetti (1911)
- Mauricio Jimenes (1912)
- Joaquín Barba (1807)
- Cnel Elías Anderson y Laya (1906)
- Carlos Anderson (1906)
- Pedro Livio Cedeño
- Fabio Fiallo (1920)

== Gallery ==
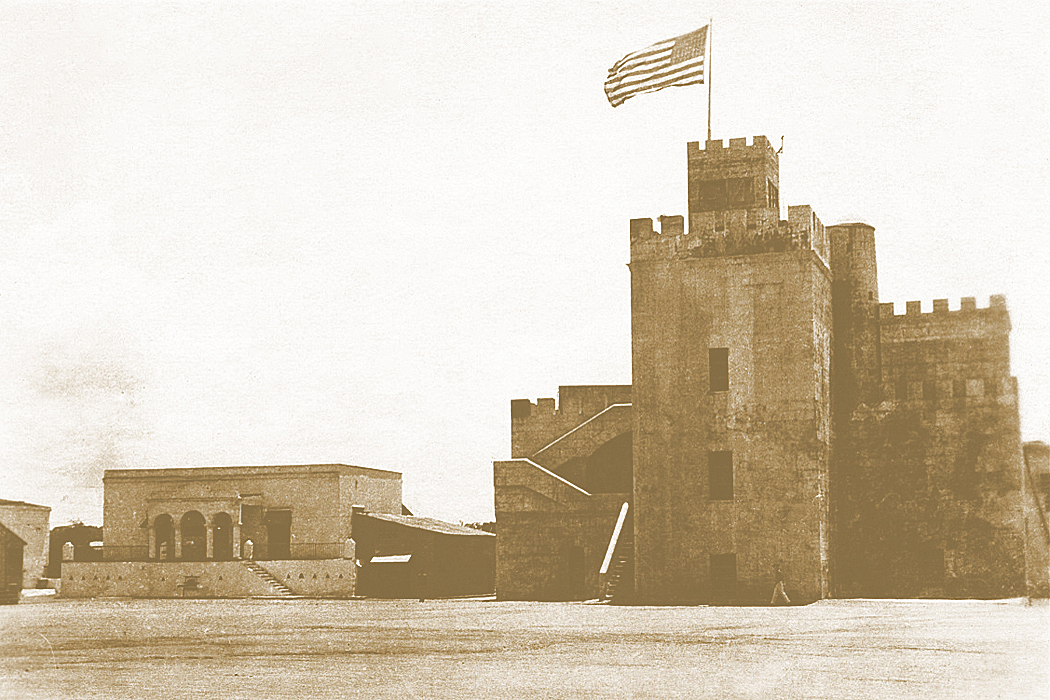
Fortaleza Ozama in 1922 with the USA flag.

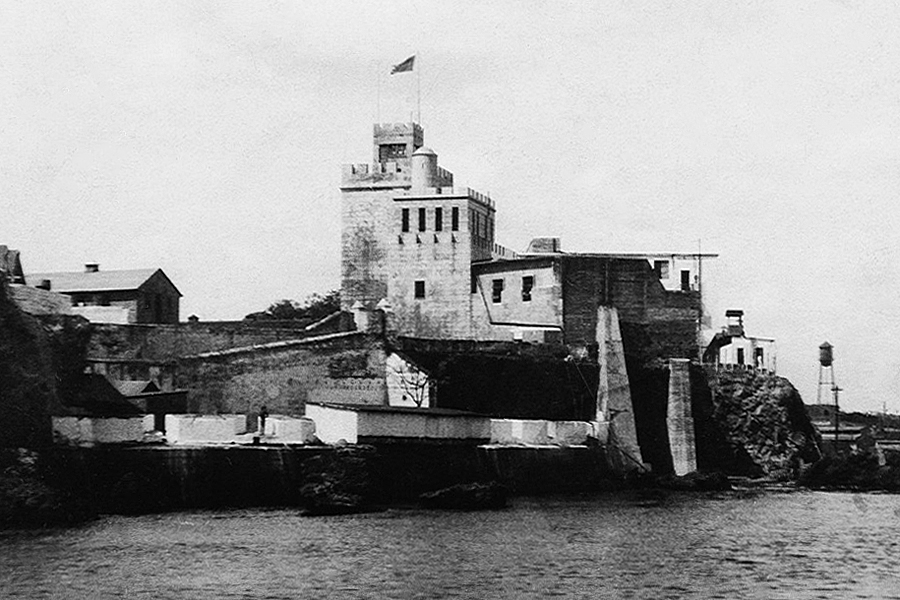
Fortaleza Ozama in 1922.

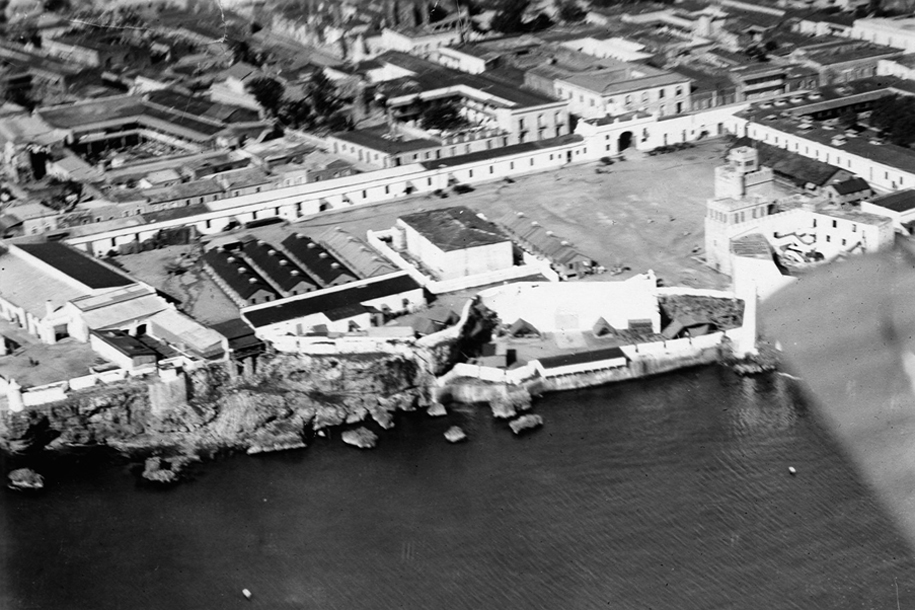
Aerial view of Fortaleza Ozama in 1922

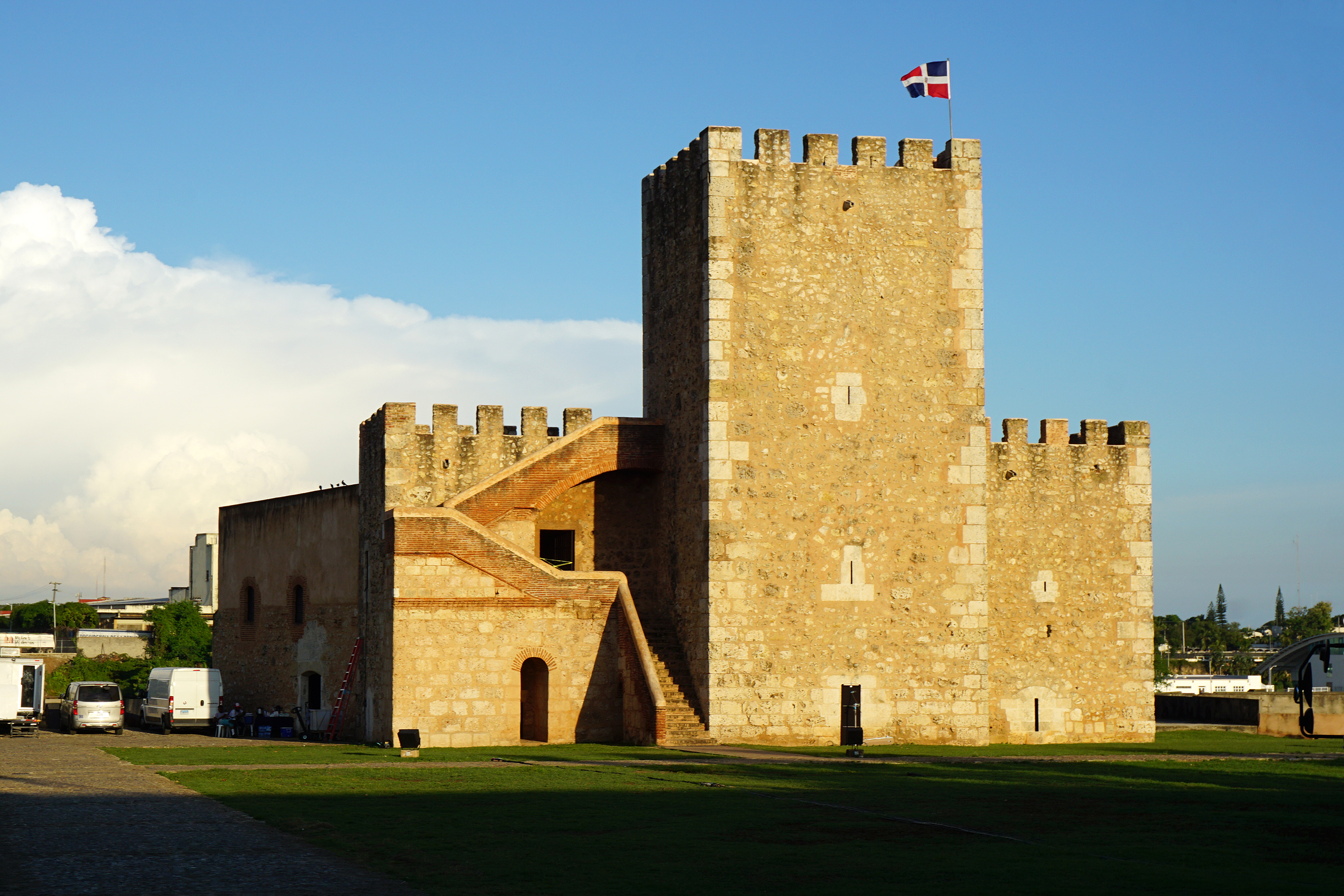
Ozama Fortress today

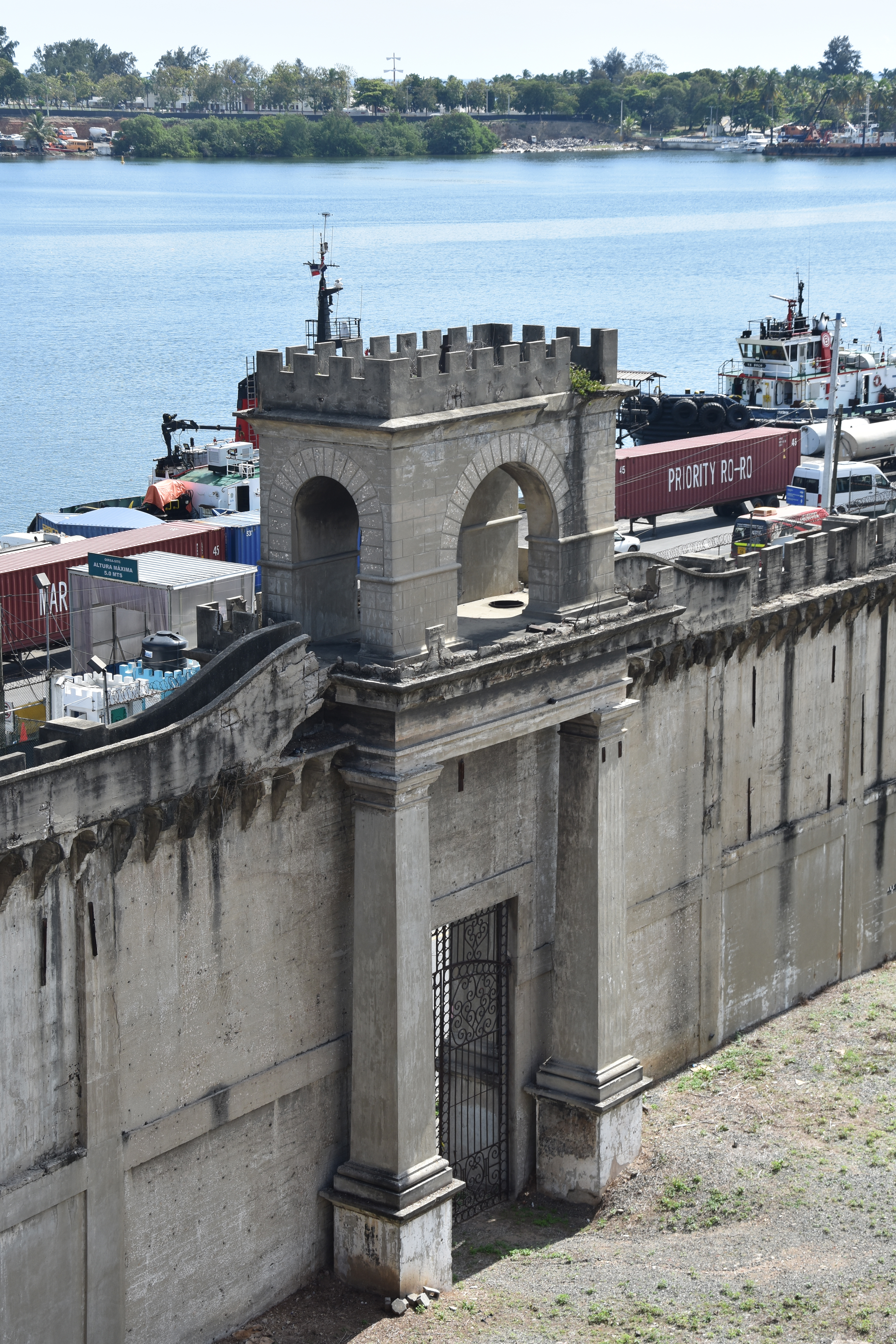
Colonial Wall Gate next to Fortaleza Ozama

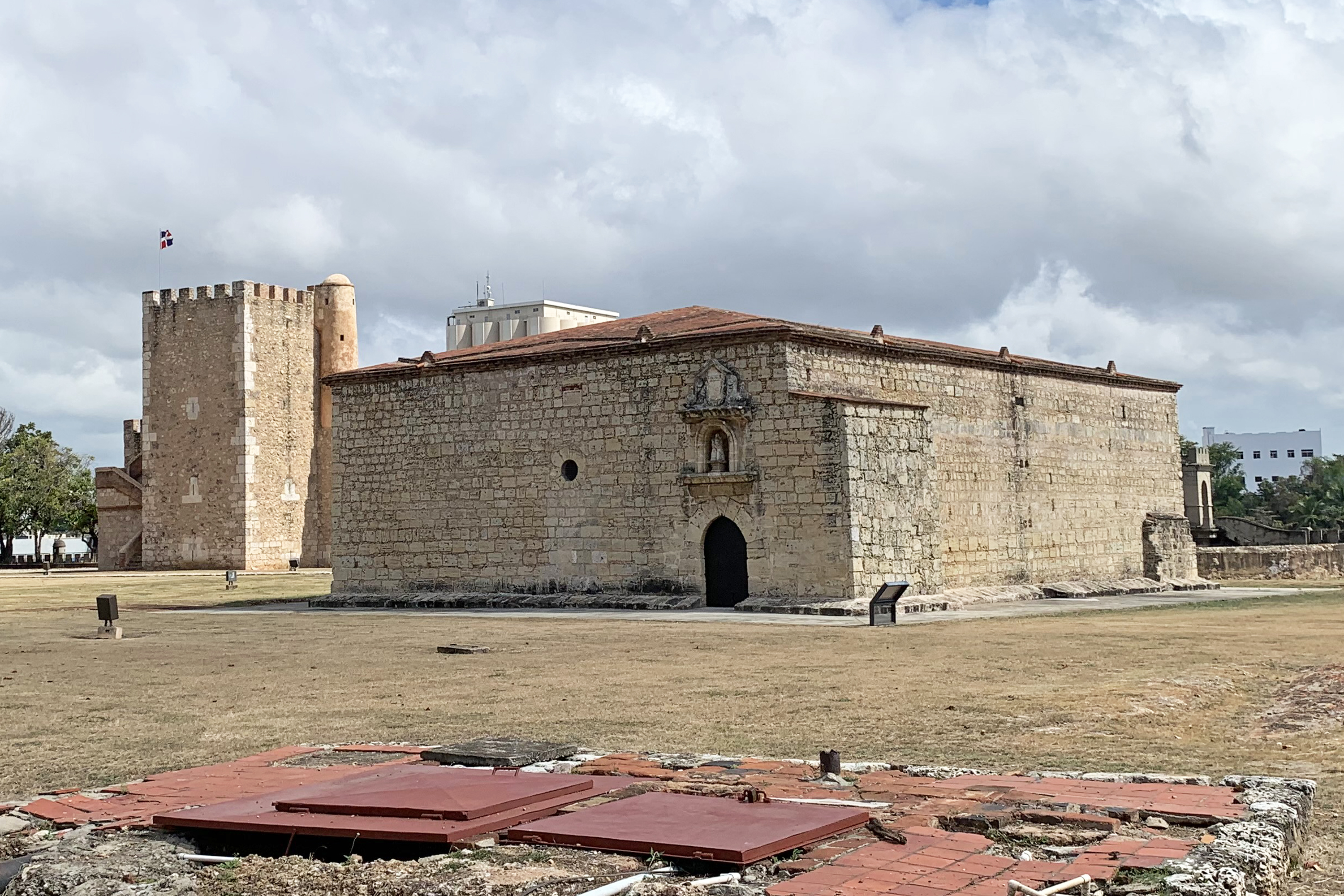
Former ammunitions store of the Fortaleza Ozama

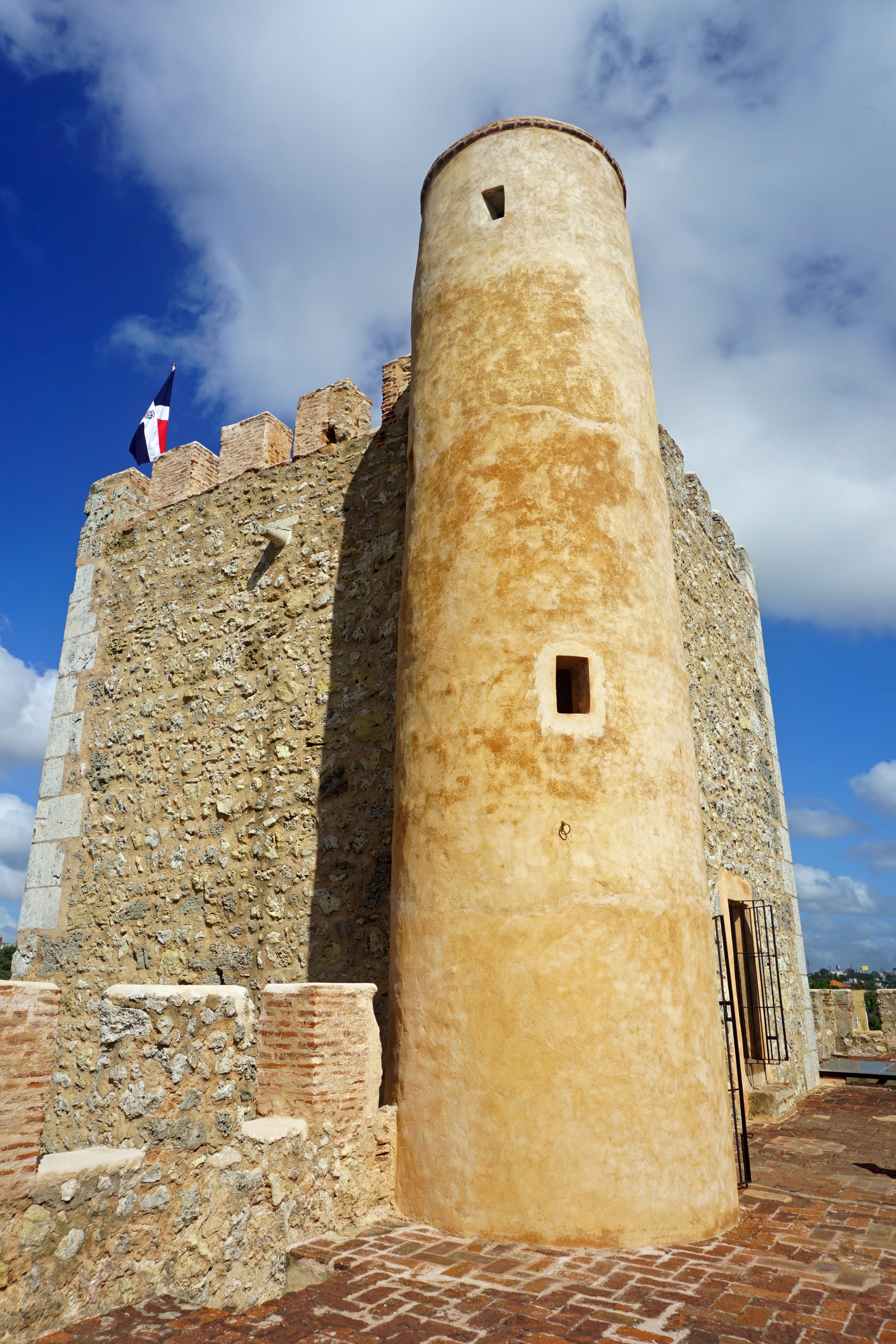
Tower of Homage

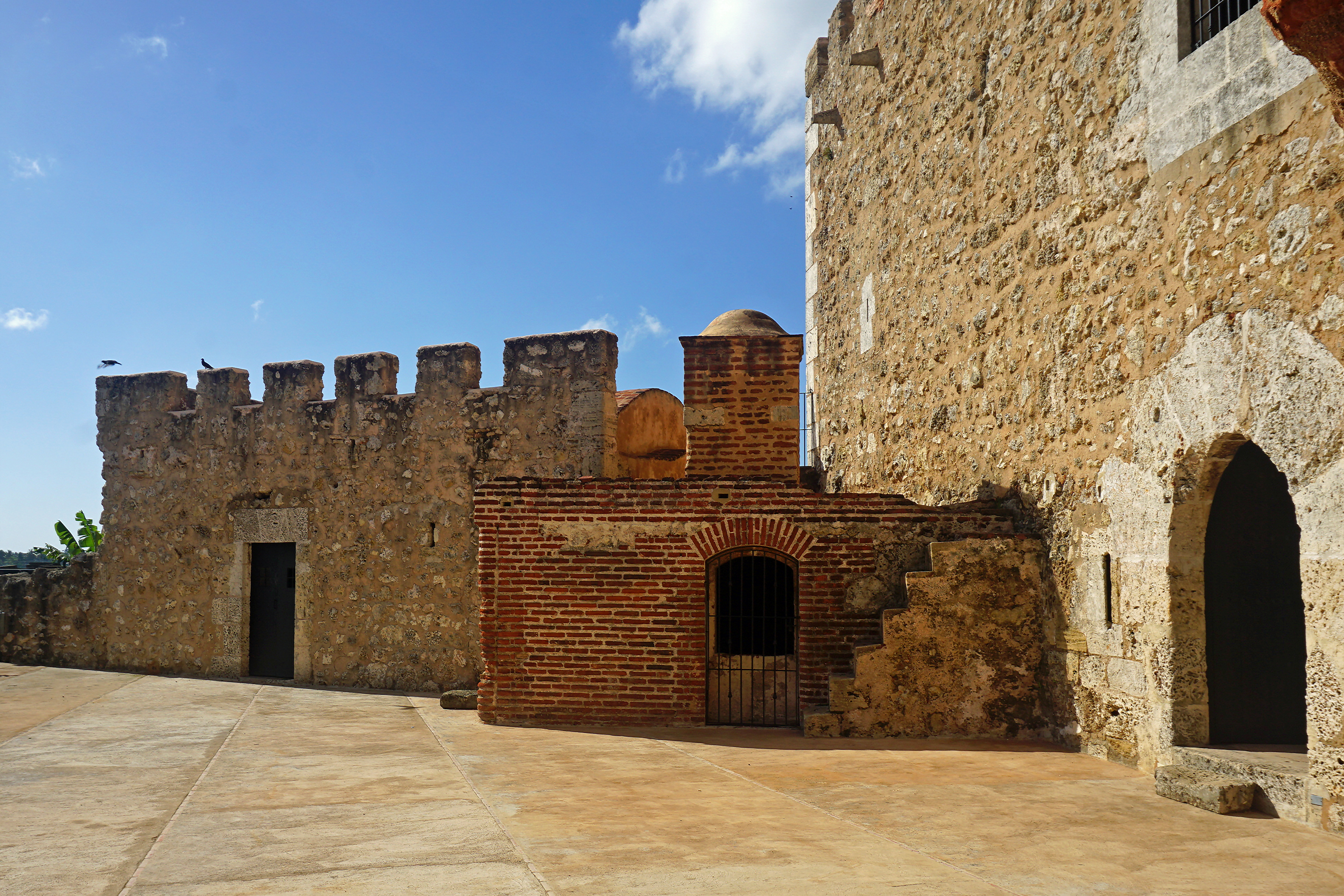
Top of the lower tower

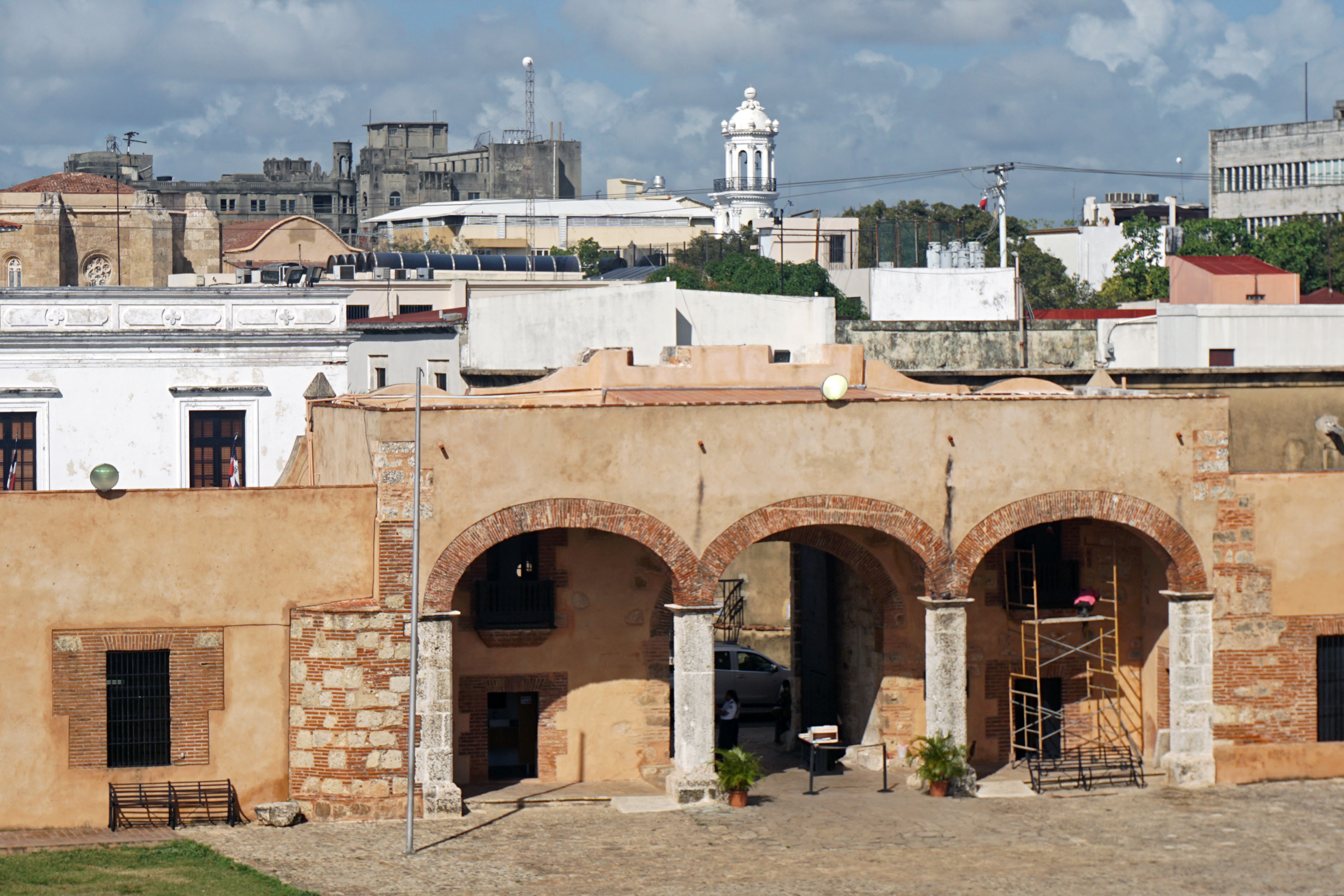
Fortress entrance

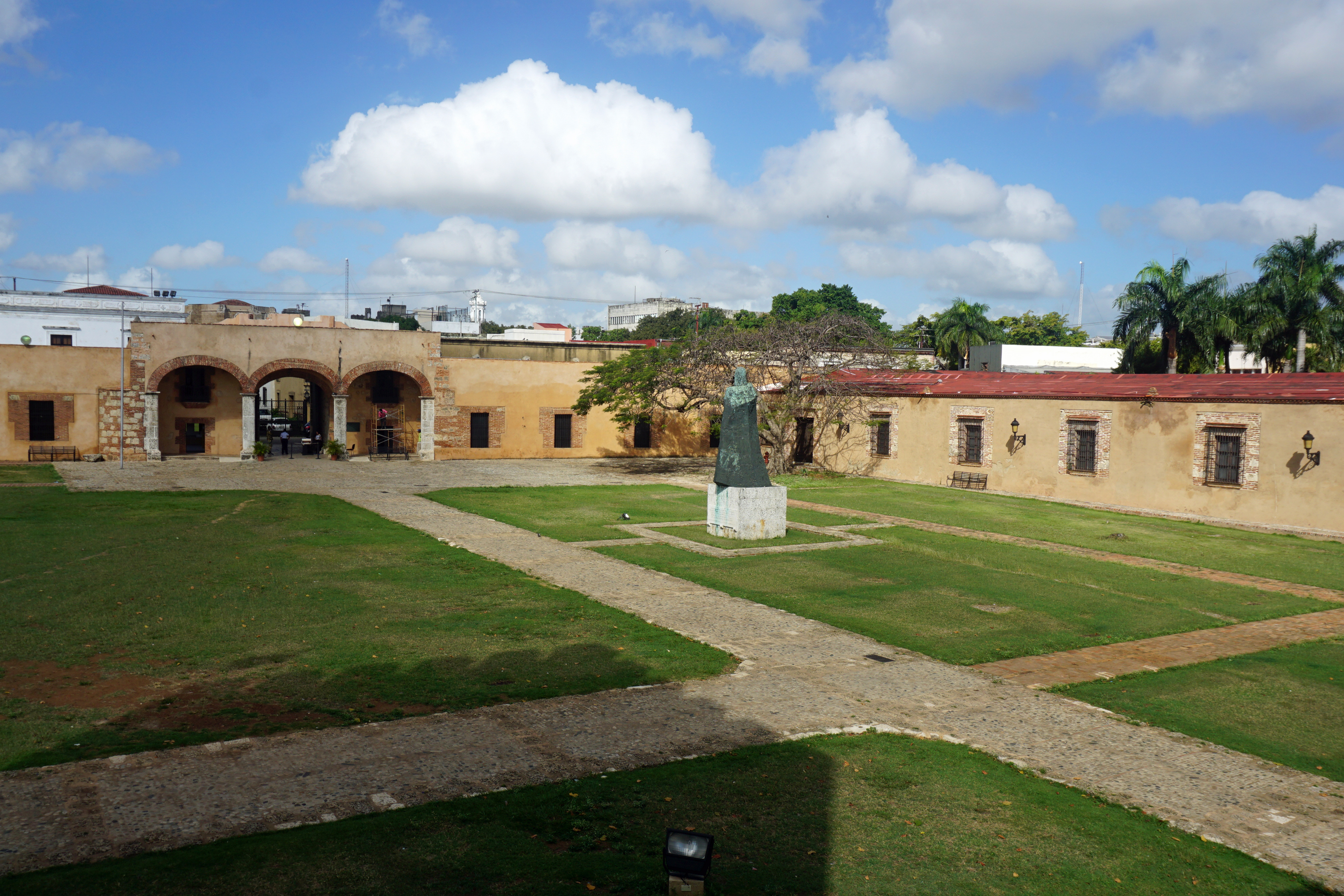
Fortress interior garden

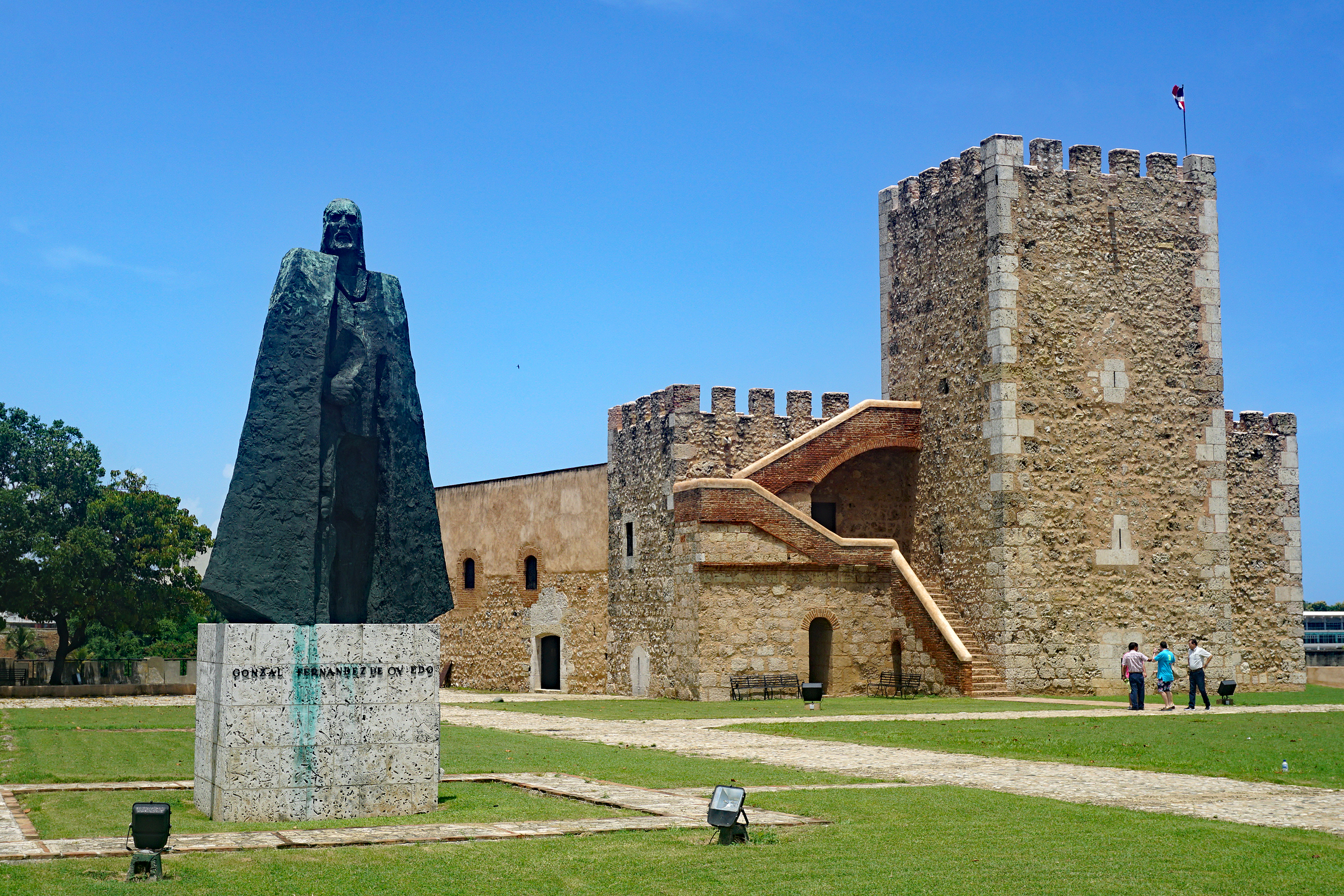
Statue of Gonzalo Fernández de Oviedo y Valdés

== See also ==
- List of colonial buildings in Santo Domingo
- Colonial City of Santo Domingo
- List of oldest buildings in the Americas
