= Altar de la Patria =

Altar of the Homeland
- Altar de la Patria (Spanish)
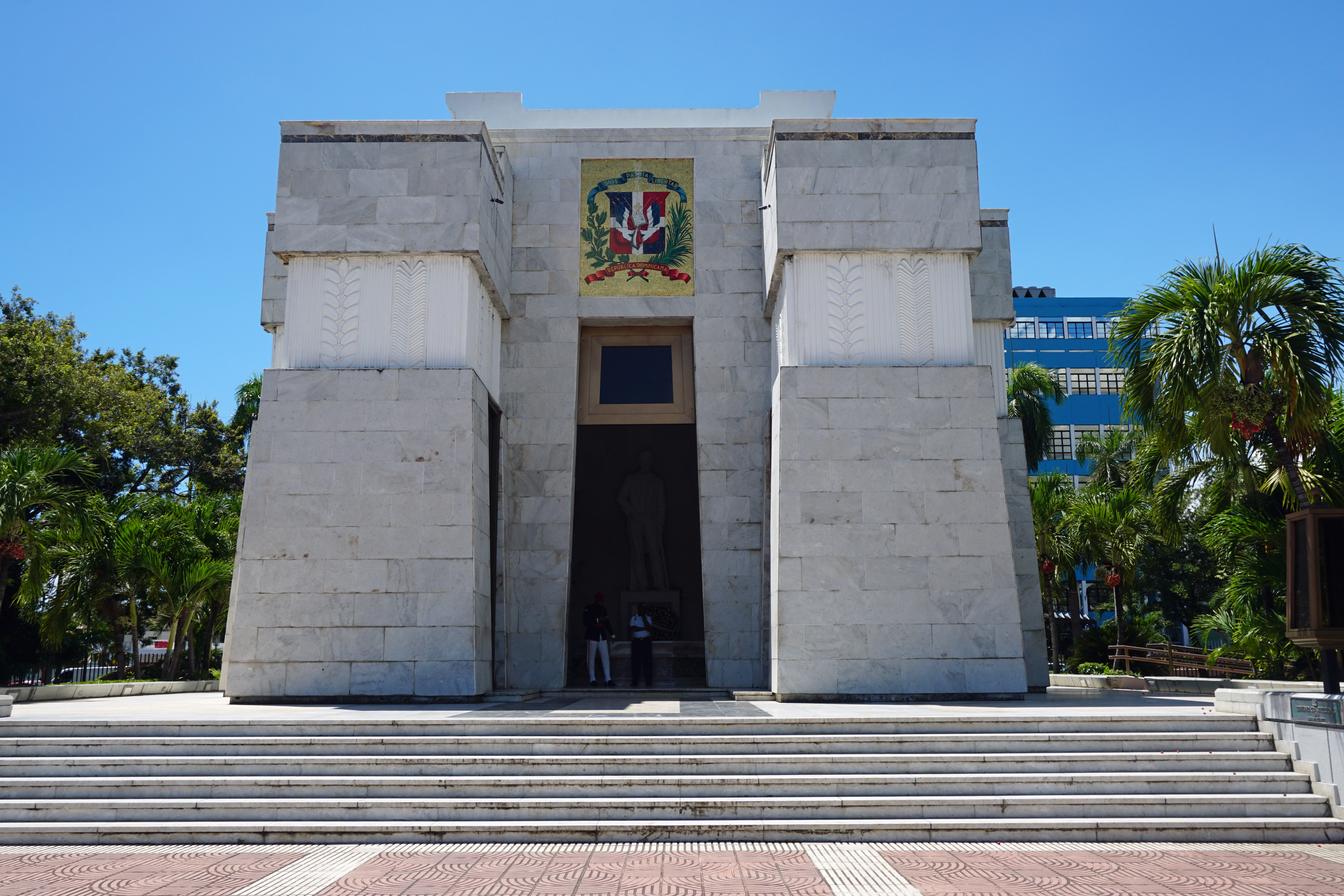
- View of the Altar from the Independence Park

- Location in Dominican Republic
- 18.471237°N 69.892416°W
- Location: Santo Domingo, Dominican Republic

History
- Built: 1976

Site notes
- Architect: Cristian Martínez Villanueva

Altar de la Patria, or Altar of the Homeland, is a white marble mausoleum in Santo Domingo, Dominican Republic that houses the remains of the founding fathers of the Dominican Republic: Juan Pablo Duarte, Francisco del Rosario Sánchez, and Ramón Matías Mella, collectively known as Los Trinitarios. Within the mausoleum there are statues of the founding fathers, carved by Italian sculptor Nicholas Arrighini; there is as well an eternal flame that is kept lit in memory of the patriots. The Altar is within the Baluatre del Conde and is the main attraction of the Parque Independencia (Independence Park).

== History ==
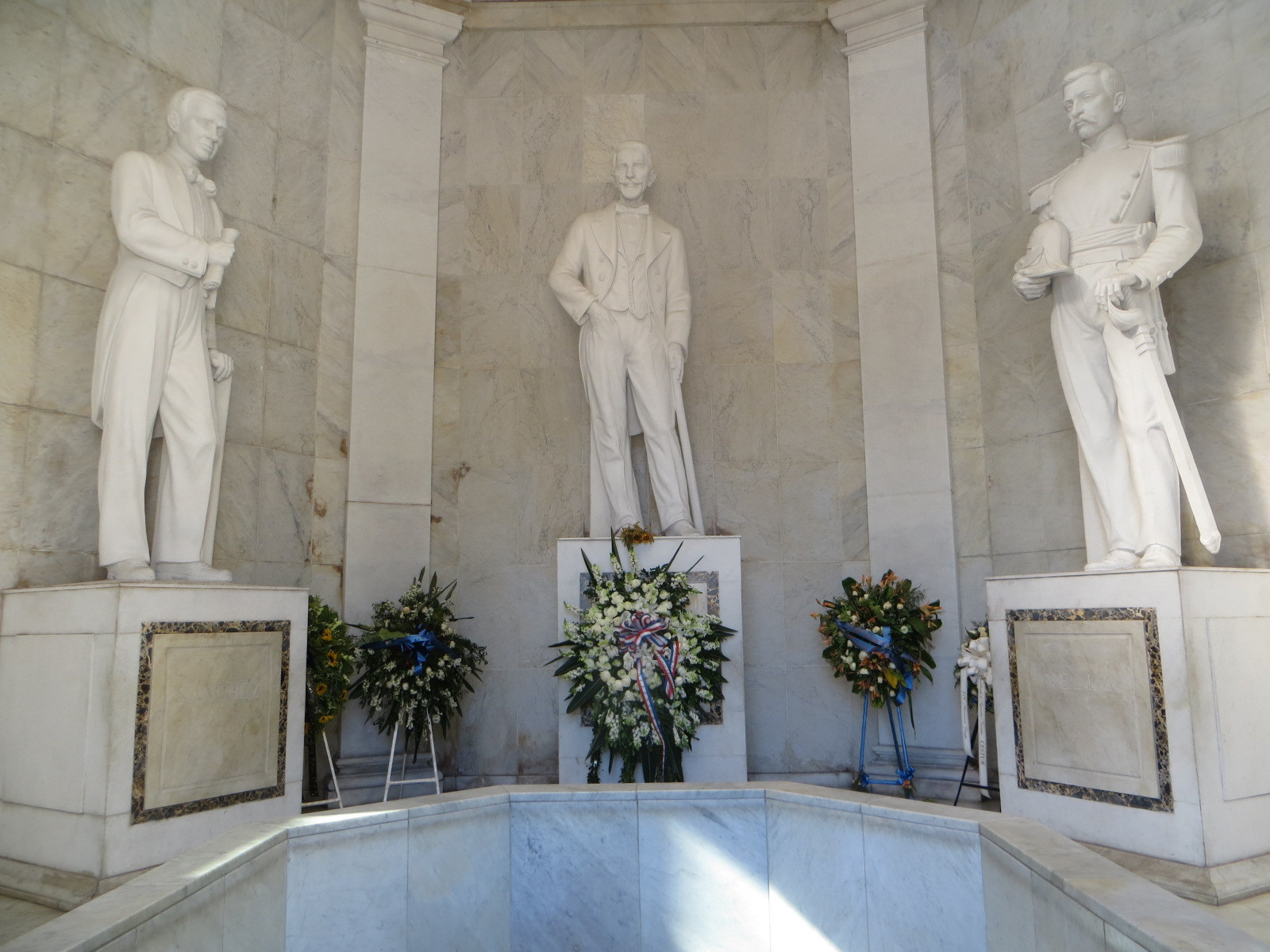
From left to right, the tombs of Francisco del Rosario Sánchez, Juan Pablo Duarte, and Matías Ramón Mella, the founding fathers of the Dominican Republic

In 1912, the Puerta del Conde was redesigned by architect Antonin Nechodoma to its present state; no longer was there a street passing through the park. This redesign later facilitated the construction of the Altar de la Patria in 1976. The Altar was located at the center of El Parque Independencia by architect Cristian Martínez Villanueva.

Prior to being placed in the Altar de la Patria, the remains of the founding fathers were kept at Capilla de los Inmortales de la Catedral de Santo Domingo (Chapel of the Immortals of the Cathedral of Santo Domingo). From March 27, 1943, they were kept at La Puerta del Conde for 33 years, before they found their final resting place in the then newly built Altar de la Patria.

== See also ==
- History of the Dominican Republic
