= Benigno del Castillo =

Dominican lawyer and writer (1830–1861)

Benigno del Castillo (1830 – July 4, 1861) was a Dominican lawyer and writer. He was a martyr of the Dominican Restoration War.

== Life ==
Although it is stated that his birth was in Baní, in 1830, his intellectual development took place in Santo Domingo. He was a lawyer, eloquent speaker, and writer with a great talent for poetry and patriotism who was capable of dying as he died for the independence of his country.

He was an officer in the campaigns against the Haitian invasions. In the Cibaeño Revolution against Buenaventura Báez, Castillo was on the official side, the Baecista. When the government fell to Spanish annexation, he went into exile with his leader, there he enlisted in the patriotic expedition led by Francisco del Rosario Sánchez and entered the Dominican Republic at the end of June 1861. He fell prisoner alongside the hero and with him he went down to the tomb and climbed up to glory before the executioners who killed him, on July 4, 1861, in San Juan de la Maguana. He was approximately 31 years old.

== See also ==
- Francisco del Rosario Sánchez
- Dominican Restoration War
