= Puerta del Conde =

UNESCO World Heritage Site
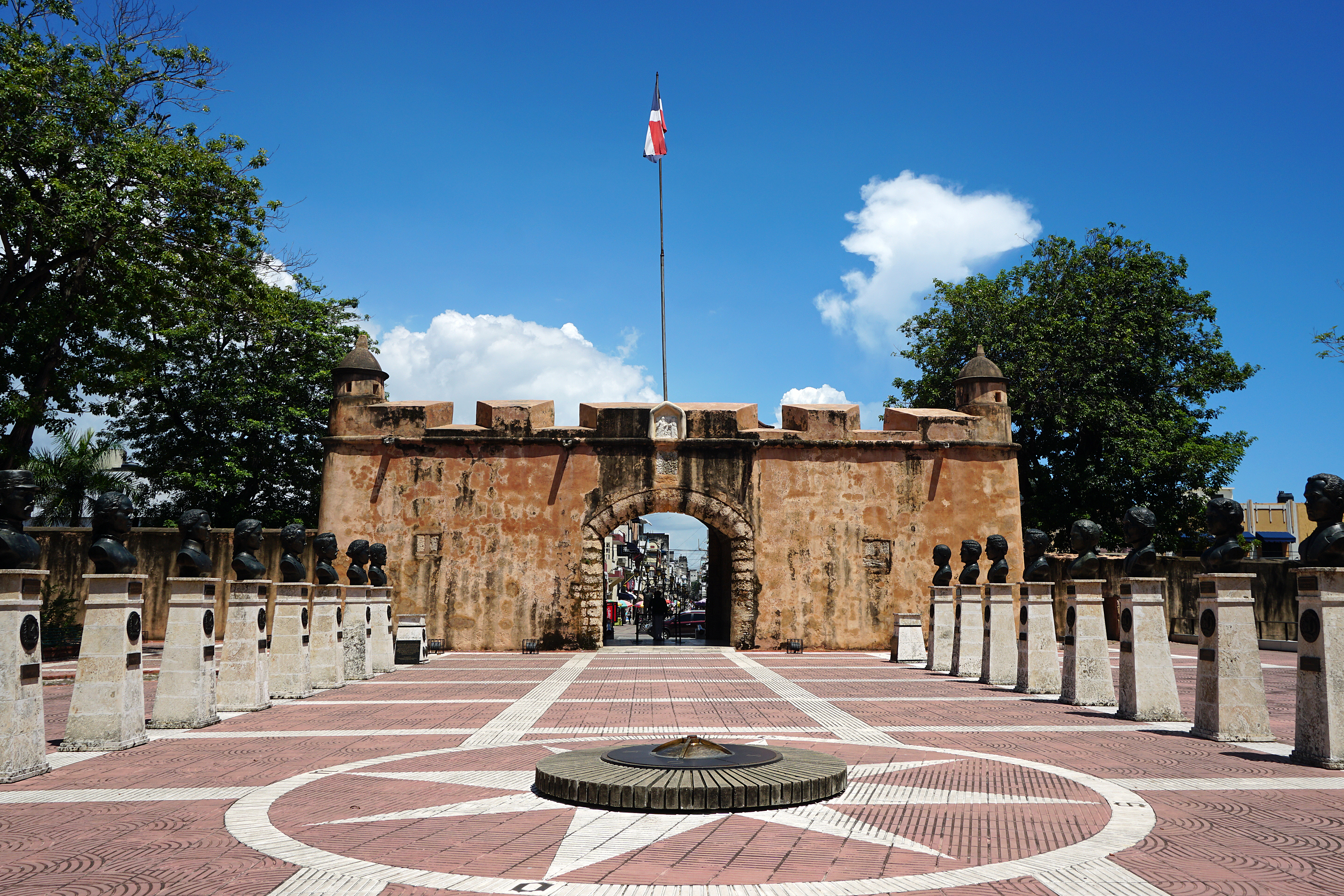

- Location within the Dominican Republic
- Location: Santo Domingo, Dominican Republic
- Part of: Colonial City of Santo Domingo
- Criteria: Cultural: (ii), (iv), (vi)
- Reference: 526
- Inscription: 1990 (14th Session)
- Coordinates: 18°28′17″N 69°53′30″W

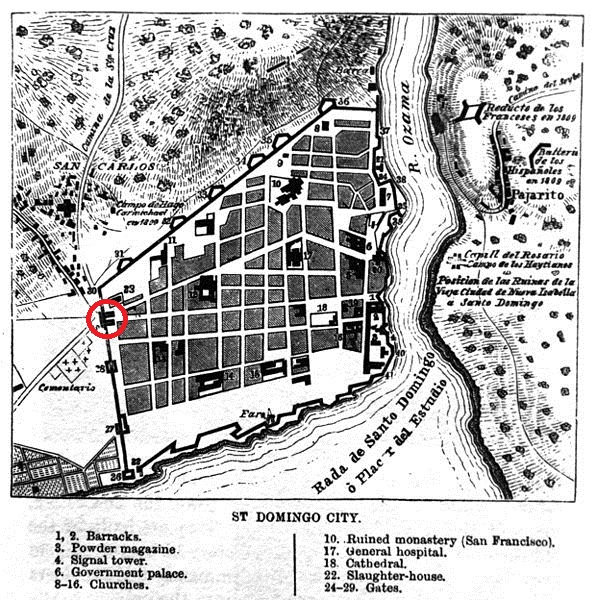
Map of Colonial Santo Domingo from 1873. The red circle indicates the location of El Baluarte del Conde.

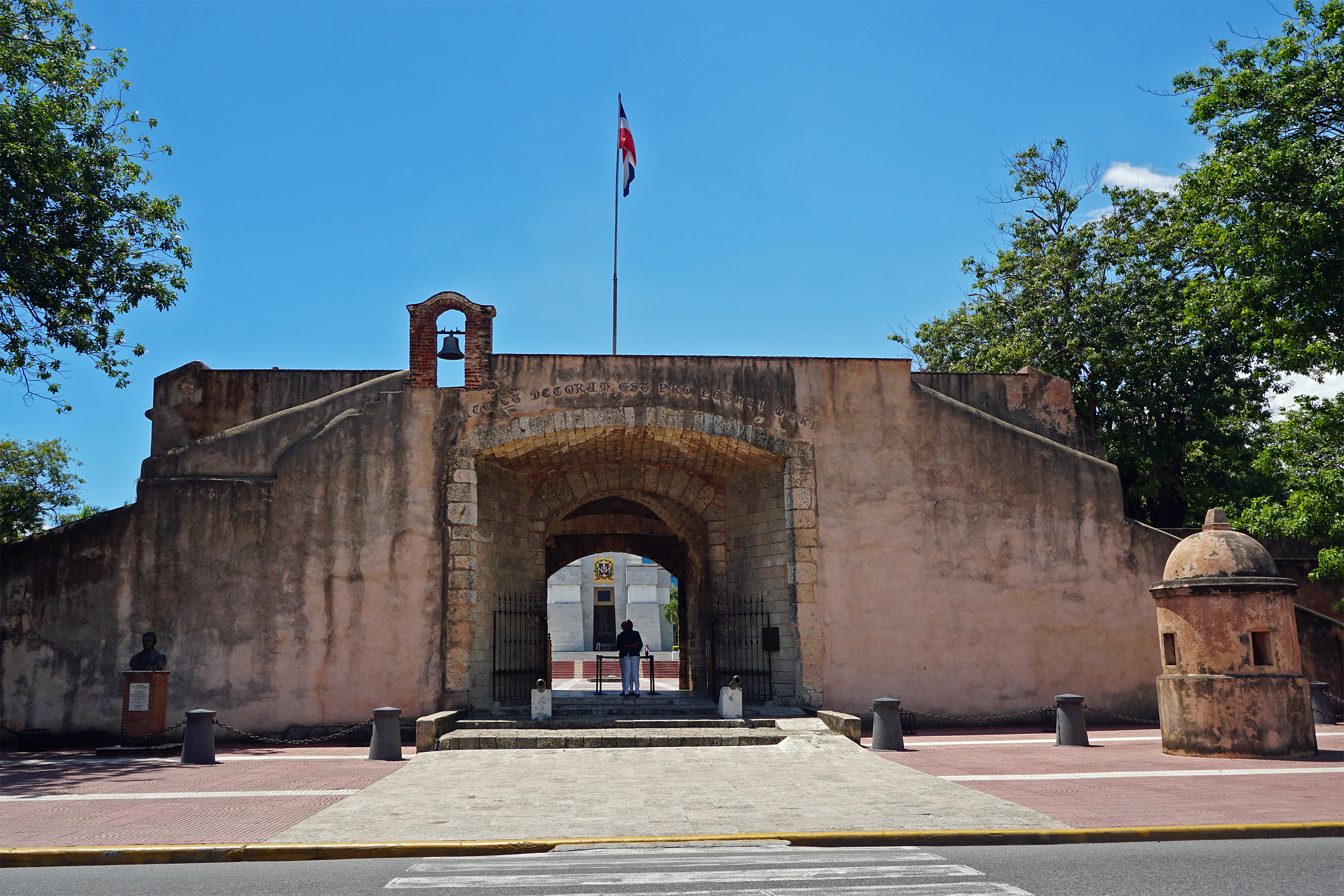
La Puerta del Conde

La Puerta del Conde (The Count's Gate) was the main entrance to the fortified city of Santo Domingo (in present-day Dominican Republic), named to honor Governor Captain-General Bernardino de Meneses Bracamonte y Zapata, 1st Count of Peñalva, who during his tenure saved the city from a siege in 1655 by Englishmen General Robert Venables and Admiral William Penn amid the Third Anglo-Spanish War.

The gate is part of a structure called El Baluarte del Conde (The Count's Bulwark), a fort in Ciudad Colonial, the colonial area of Santo Domingo. The fort was part of a larger system of fortifications that ran along a defensive wall which surrounded Ciudad Colonial. The Altar of the Fatherland and Independence Park are located there.

Francisco del Rosario Sánchez, one of the Dominican Founding Fathers, proclaimed Dominican independence and raised the first Dominican Flag, on February 27, 1844.

== History ==
=== Colonial era ===
The construction of this site began in 1543 and the site was originally named Fort San Genaro. It was designed to defend Santo Domingo from invading armies and attacks by pirates and corsairs.

The muralla (defensive wall) was modified in 1655 after the English, led by William Penn and Robert Venables, undertook the Siege of Santo Domingo. The invasion was thwarted by Spanish troops commanded by the Captain General of the Colony, Don Bernardino de Meneses y Bracamonte, Count of Peñalva. Due to his valor, the site was named in his honor La Puerta del Conde. The muralla was appended to Fort San Genaro and the structures became indistinguishable and known since 1655 as La Puerta del Conde.

El Baluarte del Conde was a typical model of the school of 17th-century bastion fortresses of Italian influence, which are preserved in the Caribbean as a major legacy of 17th-century fortifications. The city's defensive wall reached its full footprint by about the 18th century with the addition of various defensive structures, effectively enclosing Colonial Santo Domingo in a pentagonal wall. La Puerta del Conde was the western entrance into Colonial Santo Domingo. Not much remains of the defensive walls which once surrounded the entire city, except for several sections with gates and forts, including: La Puerta del Conde, La Puerta de la Misericordia, Fuerte San Jose, Fuerte Santa Barbara, Fuerte San Gil, etc.

== Contemporary Dominican Republic ==
Today, La Puerta del Conde serves as the main entrance to El Parque Nacional (The National Park), also referred to as Independence Park. Inscribed above the arch of La Puerta del Conde is "ỉDulce et Decori est pro patria moriḯ", in Latin, which means "It is indeed sweet and honorable to die for the fatherland". El Baluarte del Conde is a symbol of independence and contains several monuments and structures which attest to the Dominican struggle for freedom. It is common to refer to the fort as La Puerta del Conde/Parque Nacional, being that these are the two most visible and relevant symbols of the Dominican Republic; the park is where the Altar de la Patria (the Altar of the Fatherland) is located.

=== Parque Independencia ===
El Parque Independencia (Independence Park) is a historic park within the confines of El Baluarte del Conde so named because it contains the site where Dominican independence was proclaimed in 1844. The Altar de la Patria (see below) is located in the Park. Parque Independencia is nowadays only bound by a section of the original defensive wall, La Puerta del Conde. In 1912, the Park was redesigned by architect Antonin Nechodoma to its present state; no longer was there a street passing through the park. This redesign later facilitated the construction of the Altar de la Patria.

=== Altar de la Patria ===
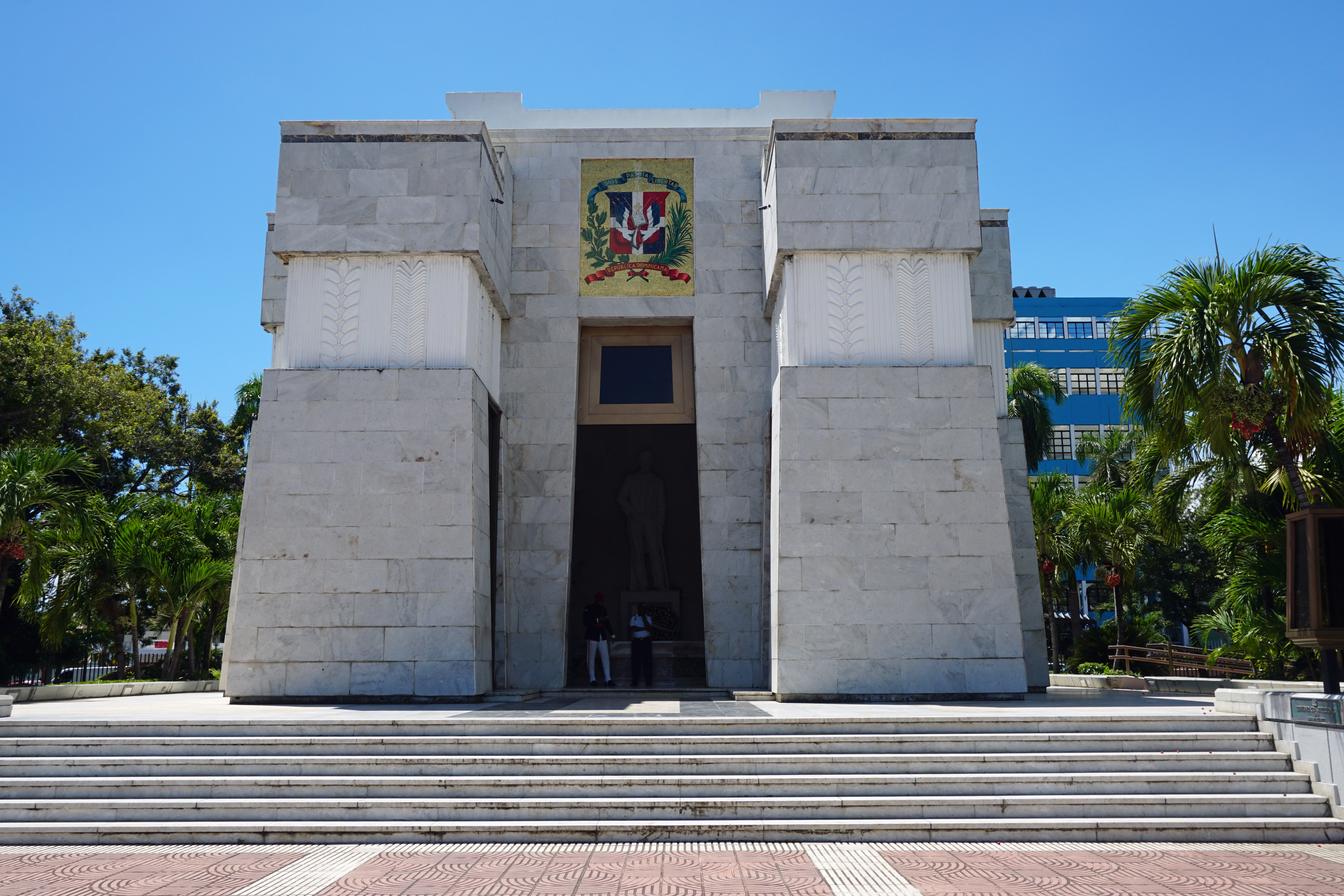
Altar de la Patria

The Altar de la Patria, or Altar of the Fatherland, is a mausoleum made of white marble, built in 1976. The Altar houses the remains of the founding fathers of the Dominican Republic: Juan Pablo Duarte, Francisco del Rosario Sánchez, and Matías Ramón Mella, Within the mausoleum there are statues of the founding fathers, carved by Italian sculptor Nicholas Arrighini, and there is also an "eternal flame" that is kept lit in memory of the patriots.

== See also ==
- History of the Dominican Republic
