= Dominican Republic–Haiti relations =

Bilateral diplomatic relations

- Dominican Republic: Haiti

Dominican Republic–Haiti relations are the diplomatic relations between the Dominican Republic and the Republic of Haiti. Relations have long been hostile due to substantial ethnic and cultural differences, historic conflicts, territorial disputes, and sharing the island of Hispaniola, part of the Greater Antilles archipelago in the Caribbean region. The living standards in the Dominican Republic are considerably higher than those in Haiti. The economy of the Dominican Republic is ten times larger than that of Haiti. The migration of impoverished Haitians and historical differences have contributed to long-standing conflicts.

The island of Hispaniola was the site of the first permanent European settlement in the Americas, the Captaincy General of Santo Domingo established in 1493 by Spain. The Spanish Empire controlled the entire island from the 1490s until the 17th century. Due to its strategic location British and French pirates began establishing bases on the western side of the island. Battles began during colonial times and developed into constant conflicts between the European powers. Eventually the island was divided in 1697, with Spain controlling the eastern side and France controlling the western side.

The distinction between the colonies was accentuated by differing settlement patterns. Spain developed a settler-based society with a white and mixed-race majority, while the French brought masses of African slaves to their side of the island. France trafficked nearly ten times as many slaves, creating a divergent population in their colony. These historical events led to Dominicans and Haitians becoming culturally and ethnically different groups.

During the start of the 19th century Haiti became independent from France after a series of slave revolts in 1804. Afterwards the Spanish colony of Santo Domingo, the predecessor of the Dominican Republic, also became independent from Spain in 1821 after more than 300 years of Spanish control. Thus since 1804 many wars, massacres, border disputes, and stand-offs have occurred between the two countries. Haiti would eventually become the poorest country in the region, while the Dominican Republic developed into one of the largest economies of Latin America. In the 21st century, illegal Haitian immigration into the Dominican Republic ensure tensions remain high. Many Haitians migrate due to extreme poverty and political unrest in their country.

== Country comparison ==
	Dominican Republic	Republic of Haiti
Coat of Arms		
Flag	Dominican Republic	Haiti
Population	11,532,151	11,470,261
Area	48,671 km^{2} (18,792 mi^{2})	27,700 km^{2} (10,700 mi^{2})
Population Density	220/km^{2} (570/sq mi)	417/km^{2} (1,080/sq mi)
Capital	Santo Domingo	Port-au-Prince
Largest City	Santo Domingo – 1,029,110 (4,274,651 Metro)	Port-au-Prince – 1,200,000 (3,133,000 Metro)
Government	Unitary presidential republic	Unitary semi-presidential republic under an interim government (de jure); Limited to none (de facto)
First Leader	José Núñez de Cáceres	Jean-Jacques Dessalines
Current Leaders	Luis Abinader	Alix Didier Fils-Aimé
Official languages	Spanish	French and Haitian creole
GDP (nominal)	US$334.292 billion ($30,710 per capita)	US$38.200 billion ($3,040 per capita)

== History ==
=== European colonization ===
Christopher Columbus colonized the island of Hispaniola during his first voyage to the Americas in 1492. The original inhabitants of the island were the Native Tainos, an indigenous group related to the Amazonian natives of South America. The native Tainos suffered a steep population decline early on due to brutal enslavement, warfare, and intermixing with the Spanish colonizers. When the Spanish Crown outlawed the enslavement of Natives in the island with the Laws of Burgos, slaves from West Africa and Central Africa were trafficked from the 16th to 18th centuries. These Africans eventually intermixed with the Europeans, Mestizos, and Natives creating a triracial Creole culture in Santo Domingo. The official name was La Española, meaning "The Spanish (Island)". It was also called Santo Domingo, after Saint Dominic.

Main cities and towns of Hispaniola during the early 1600s.

The political division of the island of Hispaniola is due to the European struggle for control of the New World, when France and Spain began fighting for control of the island. They resolved their dispute in 1697 by splitting the island into two colonies. France established a lucrative plantation economy and trafficked nearly ten times as many slaves on their side of the island. Meanwhile, in the eastern side of the island the Spanish promoted the migration of white settlers from Canary Islands to fight against further incursions in the colony of Santo Domingo throughout the 18th century. The Spanish colonial administration invested more in infrastructure and institutions in Santo Domingo compared to the French administration in Haiti.

The population of Santo Domingo was approximately 125,000 in the year 1791. Of this number, 40,000 were white landowners, about 70,000 were mixed-race, and 15,000 were black slaves. This contrasted sharply with neighboring Saint-Domingue (Haiti), which had an enslaved population of approximately 860,000 slaves, representing 90% of the French colony's population, and accounting for nearly two fifths of the entire Atlantic slave trade from 1785 to 1790. As restrictions on colonial trade were relaxed, the colonial French elites of St. Domingue offered the principal market for Santo Domingo's exports of beef, hides, mahogany and tobacco.

=== Wars of Independence ===
In the 1790s, large-scale slave rebellions erupted in the French portion of the island, which led to the eventual removal of the French and the independence of Haiti in 1804. At Dessaline's order, Haitian rebels, most formerly enslaved, fought back against European enslavers and colonizers, successfully pushing out the French population of Haiti. The eastern portion of the island was preparing itself for an eventual separation from Spain.

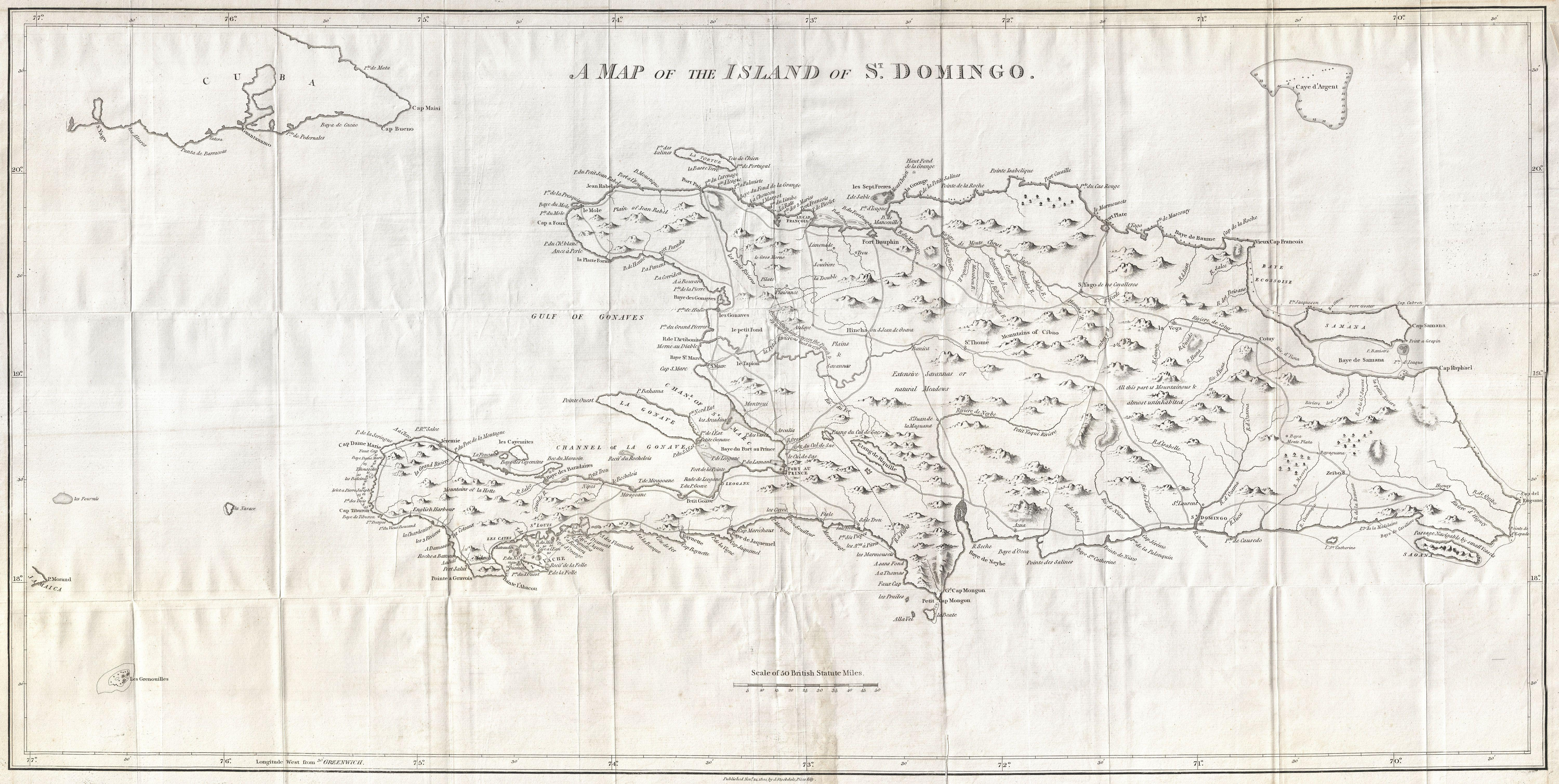
Map of the island of Hispaniola published by John Stockdale in 1800 showing the line of demarcation between French and Spanish portions of the island as defined in 1776. These divisions would later evolve into Haiti and the Dominican Republic as we know them today. Edwards further identifies the Mountains of Cibao, where Columbus famously sought for gold.

With the outbreak of the Haitian Revolution, the rich urban families linked to the colonial bureaucracy left the island, while most of the rural hateros (cattle ranchers) remained, even though they lost their principal market. Nevertheless, the Spanish crown saw in the unrest an opportunity to seize all, or part, of the western region of the island in an alliance with the rebellious slaves. The Spanish governor of Santo Domingo purchased the allegiance of mulatto and black rebel leaders and their personal armies. In July 1793, Spanish forces, including former slaves, crossed the border and pushed back the disheveled French forces before them.

Although the Spanish and Dominican soldiers had been successful on the island during their battles against the French, such had not been the case in the European front, as Spain and Portugal lost the War of the Pyrenees, and on 22 July 1795, the French Republic and Spanish crown signed the Treaty of Basel. Frenchmen were to return to their side of the Pyrenees in Europe and Spanish Santo Domingo was to be ceded to France. This period called the Era de Francia, lasted until 1809 until being recaptured by the Dominican general Juan Sanchez Ramirez in the reconquest of Santo Domingo.

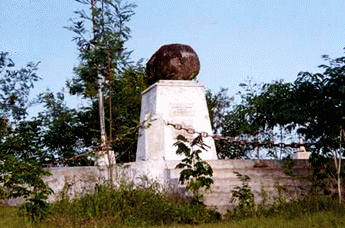
Monument to the Battle of Palo Hincado in Cotuí, Sánchez Ramírez, Dominican Republic.

=== 1821–1844 ===
On 9 November 1821 the Spanish colony of Santo Domingo was overthrown by a group of rebels at the command of José Núñez de Cáceres, the colony's former administrator, as they proclaimed independence from the Spanish crown on 1 December 1821.

Santo Domingo was regionally divided with many rival and competing provincial leaders. During this period in time the Spanish crown wielded little to no influence in the colony. Some wealthy cattle ranchers had become rulers, and sought to bring control and order in the southeast of the colony where the "law of machete" ruled the land. On 9 November 1821, the former Captain general in charge of the colony, José Núñez de Cáceres, influenced by all the Revolutions that were going on around him, finally decided to overthrow the Spanish government and declared independence from Spanish rule, this would usher in an Ephemeral Independence that was abolished by Haiti.

A group of Dominican politicians and military officers in the frontier region had expressed interest in uniting the entire island, while they sought power with military support from Haitian officials against their enemies.

Haiti's president, Jean-Pierre Boyer, a mulatto who was seen as an ally promised his full support to the frontier governors. Boyer had also made a concession with the French, and agreed to pay France for the lost territory of Haiti. Boyer agreed to pay a sum of 150 million Francs (nearly twice what France had charged the United States for the much larger Louisiana territory in 1803) in exchange for the recognition of Haiti's independence.

Eventually, the Boyer dictatorship became extremely unpopular throughout the island. The Dominican population grew increasingly impatient with Boyer's poor management and perceived incompetence, the suppression of Dominican culture, and the heavy taxation that was imposed on their side. The island was hit with a severe economic crisis after being forced to pay a huge indemnity to France.

Attempts to redistribute land conflicted with the Dominican system of communal land tenure (terrenos comuneros), which had arisen with the ranching economy, while the Haitian peasants also resented being forced to grow cash crops under Boyer's Code Rural. In rural areas, the Haitian administration was usually too inefficient to enforce its own laws. It was in the city of Santo Domingo that the effects of the occupation were most acutely felt, and it was there that the movement for independence originated.

In 1838, Juan Pablo Duarte, an educated nationalist, founded a resistance movement called La Trinitaria ("The Trinity") along with Ramón Matías Mella and Francisco del Rosario Sánchez. It was so named because its original nine members had organized themselves into cells of three. The cells went on to recruit as separate organizations, maintaining strict secrecy.

In 1843, Haitian conspirators made a breakthrough as they overthrew President Jean-Pierre Boyer, while placing another mulatto Charles Rivière-Hérard in charge. Hérard, faced a rebellion by blacks in Port-au-Prince. The two regiments of Dominicans were among those used by Hérard to suppress the uprising. Dominican nationalists decided to take action with the leadership of Francisco del Rosario Sánchez, Ramón Matías Mella, and Pedro Santana, a wealthy cattle-rancher from El Seibo who commanded a private army who worked on his estates.

On 27 February 1844, some 100 Dominicans seized the fortress of Puerta del Conde in the city of Santo Domingo, and the following day the Haitian garrison surrendered. As these Haitian troops withdrew to the west side of the island, they pillaged, burned and massacred Dominican civilians. In retaliation, Dominican gunboats bombarded Haitian ports.

=== Dominican War of Independence (1844–1856) ===
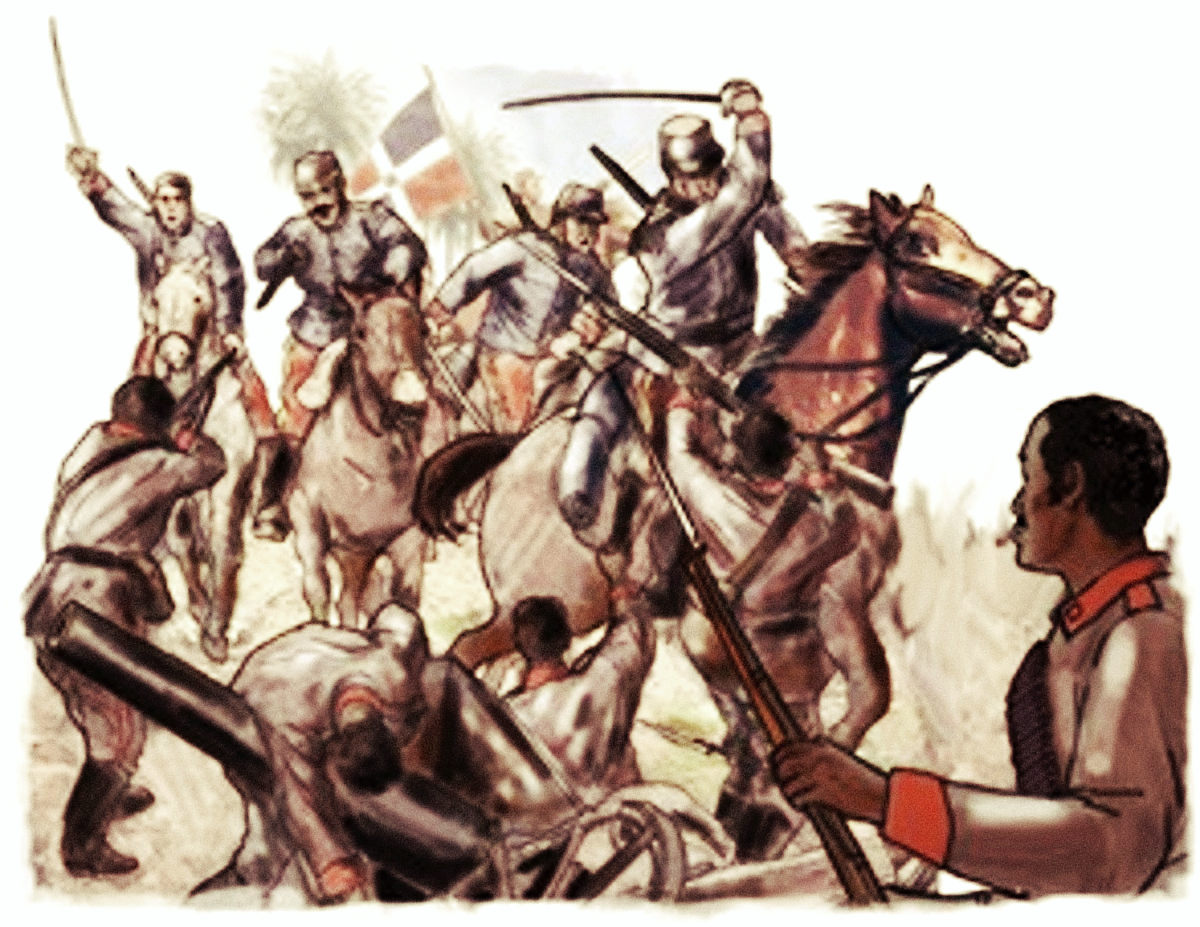
Dominican war with Haiti, 1844–1856

Haitian Commander, Charles Rivière-Hérard, sent three columns totaling 30,000 men to try and stop the Dominican uprising. The Battle of Fuente del Rodeo was the first major armed encounter against Haiti in the war. A force of Dominican troops defeated an outnumbering force of the Haitian Army led by Hérard.

The Battle of Azua was fought on 19 March 1844. A force of some 2,200 Dominican troops led by General Pedro Santana defeated an outnumbering force of 10,000 troops of the Haitian Army led by General Souffrand. The Dominicans, killed over 1,000 Haitian soldiers while only suffering 2 dead and 3 wounded. After this victory, the Dominicans withdrew their headquarters to the Ocoa River, and the valleys of Baní, where their cavalry and lancers could operate; and in this way, they restrained the march of the Haitians, who could not advance beyond Azua; and having then attempted to open a way through the passes of the Maniel, they were in every re-encounter driven back with loss. Meanwhile, in the northern region, the Battle of Santiago was fought on 30 March. Although heavily outnumbered, the Dominican troops, led by General José María Imbert, defeated Haitian Army troops led by General Jean-Louis Pierrot.

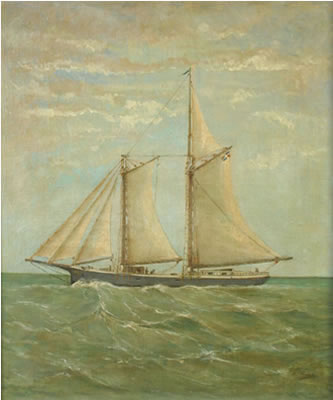
Schooner Separación Dominicana during the Battle of Tortuguero

At sea, the Dominican schooners Maria Chica (3 guns), commanded by Juan Bautista Maggiolo, and the Separación Dominicana (5 guns), commanded by Juan Bautista Cambiaso, defeated a Haitian brigantine Pandora (4 guns) plus the schooners Le signifie and La Mouche off the coast of Azua on 15 April, sinking all three enemy warships and killing all the Haitian sailors without losing any of their ships.

As a result of these successive Haitian defeats, Hérard was ousted on 3 May, leading to the temporary suspension of Haitian military operations. Santana's forces captured Santo Domingo on 12 July, where he was proclaimed the ruler of the Dominican Republic. Consequently, the rival Trinitarios were ousted from power.

With the Dominican War of Independence still waging, on 17 June 1845, Dominican troops from Las Matas, under the command of General Antonio Duvergé carried out a military offensive in Haiti, capturing four enemy trenches and killing over 100 Haitian troops at the cost of only 2 killed. The Dominicans captured two towns on the Plateau du Centre and established a bastion at Cachimán. Haitian President Jean-Louis Pierrot quickly mobilized his army and counterattacked on 13 July, resulting in over 200 casualties on the Haitian side, while the Dominican forces were able to repulse the attack without suffering any casualties. On 22 July, the Haitian forces launched another attack on the Dominican stronghold at Fort Cachimán. The Haitians were repulsed after a battle that lasted three and a half hours, in which the Dominicans only suffered seven casualties.

On 6 August, Pierrot ordered his army to invade the Dominican Republic. More than 3,000 Haitian soldiers and less than 20 Dominican militias had been killed at this point. On 17 September 1845, the Dominicans defeated the Haitian vanguard near the frontier at Estrelleta where the Dominicans attacked with the use of bayonets, a Haitian cavalry charge. On 27 September 1845, Dominican Gen. Francisco Antonio Salcedo defeated a Haitian army at the battle of "Beler," a frontier fortification. Salcedo was supported by Adm. Juan Bautista Cambiaso's squadron of three schooners, which blockaded the Haitian port of Cap-Haïtien. Among the dead were three Haitian generals. On 28 October, other Haitian armies attacked the frontier fort "El Invencible" and were repulsed after five hours of hard fighting. In a significant naval action between the Hispaniolan rivals, a Dominican squadron captured 3 small Haitian warships and 149 seamen off Puerto Plata on 21 December. On 1 January 1846, Pierrot announced a new campaign. However, in 27 February, when he ordered his troops to march against the Dominicans, the Haitian army mutinied, resulting in his overthrow. The war had become highly unpopular in Haiti, and Pierrot's successor was unable to organize another invasion.

However, Haiti had still not recognized the Dominican Republic. On 9 March 1849, Haiti's President (and soon-to-be Emperor) Faustin Soulouque led 10,000 troops in an invasion of the Dominican Republic. The Haitians attacked the Dominican garrison at Las Matas. Dominican General (and presidential contender) Santana raised 800 soldiers and, with the help of several gunboats, routed the Haitian invaders at the Battle of Las Carreras on 21–22 April. The battle opened with a cannon barrage and devolved into hand-to-hand combat.

In an attempt to forestall yet another Haitian invasion, in November 1849, Dominican President Buenaventura Báez launched a naval offensive against Haiti. A Dominican squadron composed of the brigantine 27 de Febrero and schooner Constitución and commanded by Capt. Charles J. Fagalde, a Frenchman, appeared off the Haitian coast, taking prizes. On 4 November, the squadron bombarded the Haitian village of Anse-à-Pitres and disembarked a landing party, seizing booty. The next day, the Dominican ships bombarded Les Cayes, captured a schooner and sank some small craft. Fagalde wanted to sail up the Windward Passage between Haiti and Cuba in search of more prizes. However, the Dominican crews mutinied so Fagalde returned to the port of Santo Domingo. On 8 November, Soulouque declared the Dominicans pirates, but possessing no naval force at that time he could do little else. Báez dispatched a second naval expedition against Haiti. On 3 December, the squadron composed of the brigantines 27 de Febrero and General Santana and the schooners Constitución and Las Mercedes and commanded by Juan Alejandro Acosta, bombarded and burned the town of Petit Rivière. The Dominicans also captured Dame-Marie on the west coast of Haiti, which they plundered and set on fire.

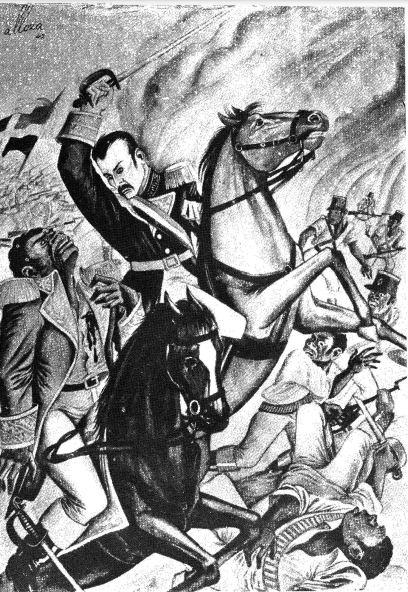
Battle of Santomé illustration

By late 1854, with Haiti still not recognizing Dominican independence and intent on its reconquest, the nations were at war again. In November, 2 Dominican ships captured a Haitian warship and bombarded two Haitian ports. In November 1855, Soulouque, having proclaimed himself Emperor Faustin I of a Haitian empire which he hoped to expand to include the Dominican Republic, invaded his neighbor again. But again the Dominicans proved to be superior soldiers, defeating Soulouque's army, which vastly outnumbered them.

In the south, 4,500 Dominicans led by José M. Cabral defeated 12,000 Haitian troops on 22 December 1855, at the Battle of Santomé. On the same day another force of Dominicans defeated 6,000 Haitian troops at the Battle of Cambronal. The Dominicans achieved a subsequent victory over a Haitian contingent of 6,000 soldiers in Ouanaminthe, resulting in the deaths of over 1,000 Haitians, with numerous others wounded and reported missing during their return to the capital. On 27 January 1856, some 8,000 Dominicans defeated 22,000 Haitians at the Battle of Sabana Larga near Dajabón after eight hours of fighting which came down to hand-to-hand combat. Thousands of dead or dying were abandoned on the battlefield. Upon Soulouque's arrival in Port-au-Prince with the remaining remnants of his army, he faced vehement curses from women who had lost their sons, brothers, and husbands in the war. Nevertheless, he succeeded in securing for Haiti possession of Lascahobas and Hinche.

Another military invasion by the Empire of Haiti in 1859 was defeated by the Dominican forces, but years of defensive warfare against Haitian irridentism left the Dominican economy in ruins. The constant threat of renewed Haitian invasion led Pedro Santana, with support from a faction of Dominicans, to reincorporate the Dominican Republic to Spain in 1861 as an overseas province with full representation in Madrid. Certain aspects of the Spanish administration led to a guerrilla war between Dominican nationalists and Spanish forces beginning in 1863, which resulted in 10,888 Spanish soldiers killed or wounded and another 30,000 dead from yellow fever. Spain spent over 33 million pesos on the war. This immense monetary cost, combined with the heavy human toll of the war, led Spain to finally withdraw its forces in 1865. The Dominicans who opposed the Spanish occupation suffered 4,000 dead, while the pro-Spanish militia under Santana suffered 10,000 casualties during the conflict. The military prowess displayed by the Dominican army during the Dominican Restoration War forced Haiti to realize that the goal of conquering the Dominican Republic was unattainable, and it finally recognized Dominican independence in 1867.

=== Trujillo Regime and the Parsley Massacre (1937) ===
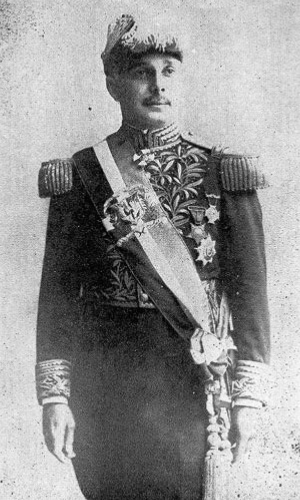
Rafael Trujillo, president of the Dominican Republic from 1930 to 1961

The Trujillo regime was marked by a period of growing anti-Haitian sentiment in the Dominican Republic, including a campaign to “Dominicanize the frontier”. Dominican dictator Rafael Trujillo built upon and weaponized racial ideology that framed Dominicans as Hispanic and white, in contrast to Haitians, who were portrayed as black and African. The hostile relations between the two nations continued due to disputes over sections of the border, which was not finally delimited until 1929. A subsequent commission set about conducting on-the-ground demarcation, however there were continuing disputes over certain sections of the boundary. Trujillo met Haitian President Sténio Vincent to settle the border issue in 1933 and again on February 27, 1935, with a final border treaty agreed upon, being signed on March 9, 1936. Despite this agreement, Trujillo subsequently launched a wave of anti-Haitian violence in 1937, culminating in the Parsley massacre in which tens of thousands of Haitians were forced across the border or killed. Rafael Trujillo ordered an attack on Haitians living in the northern border regions of the Dominican Republic, mainly in Dajabón. The number of dead is still unknown, though it is now calculated between 20,000 and 30,000 making it the deadliest massacre in the history of the Caribbean region.

=== 1963 Border Crisis ===
In early May 1963, several fugitives who the Haitian government believed were behind a failed assassination attempt on Haitian President Duvalier’s life took shelter in a Dominican Embassy in Port-au-Prince, leading to a diplomatic crisis. Haitian police followed the fugitives inside briefly before withdrawing and surrounding the Embassy. This prompted a standoff between Haiti and the Dominican Republic. Haiti would not allow the anti-government forces to leave the Embassy, while Dominican President Bosch wanted them off of Dominican soil. On May 4, Bosch issued a warning to Haiti to allow free passage of the anti-government forces and amassed 1,200 Dominican soldiers and five tanks on the border, threatening an invasion.

The United States, Canada, and the United Kingdom began evacuating citizens and coalescing forces around Port-au-Prince, believing that an armed conflict was imminent. Although the United Nations Security Council (UNSC) had an emergency meeting, it was ultimately decided that the Organization of American States (OAS) had control of the situation and would be a more effective mediator. During the UNSC meeting, Haiti accused the Dominican Republic of aggression based on the desire to “destroy the only Negro State in the Americas”, to which the Dominican Republic representative denied, citing the diverse population of the Dominican Republic. Mediation from the OAS led to de-escalation, with Haiti agreeing to give the dependents in the Embassy safe passage and Dominican troops withdrawing by May 16.

== Contemporary relations ==
=== 1991 deportations and crisis ===
In June 1991, President Joaquín Balaguer of the Dominican Republic issued decree No. 233-91, which ordered the expulsion of foreigners living and working on sugar plantations. While the decree was initially presented by the Dominican government as a humanitarian measure to combat forced labor on state-owned sugarcane plantations, and was a reaction to intense international and domestic criticism, it did not resolve itself this way.

The Dominican government and military moved quickly to carry out the decree. Over the course of three months up to 6,000 Haitians and Dominico-Haitians were deported, with tens of thousands of others fleeing to Haiti. People were rounded up by soldiers based on appearance, separated from their families, and sent to makeshift detention centers, which were largely overcrowded and abusive.

Some Dominican citizens were even stripped of their nationality. Identification documents declaring Dominican-born Haitians citizens of the DR were often destroyed, deporting these people regardless. Across the board, both the Haitian immigrants and Dominico-Haitians were not granted due process or court hearings, and given no attempt to prove the possibility of potential citizenship.

At the same time, the 1991 coup d'état of president Jean-Bertrand Aristide of Haiti led to a further refugee crisis and mass exodus of Haitians, who attempted to escape political violence, repression, and human rights abuses such as extrajudicial killings and torture carried out by the new military regime. This exodus primarily included a flood of migrants back over the Haitian-Dominican border, to the displeasure of the Dominican government. This only further exacerbated the situation, and led to a continued increase of violence and jailings, carrying over until 1992. This sudden exodus of Haitians from the Dominican Republic, coupled with the effects of the 1991 coup, led to a refugee crisis that lasted until 1994, with immigrants fleeing north chiefly to the US and the Bahamas.

=== 2010 Haitian earthquake ===
After the devastating earthquake of 12 January 2010, countless Haitians fled across the border to escape the quake's effects. The Dominican government was one of the first to send teams to help distribute food and medicine to the victims and made it easier for Haitians to acquire visas to receive treatment in Dominican hospitals. Supplies were transported to Haiti through the Dominican Republic, and many injured Haitians were treated in Dominican hospitals.

Haitian refugees were also taken in and supported by many Dominicans, though relations deteriorated as the refugees have remained in the Dominican Republic. This has led to reported concerns among some Dominicans that quake refugees contribute to rising crime, over-crowding, cholera and unemployment. More and more discrimination has been attributed to the massive numbers of Haitian refugees in the Dominican Republic. Over the past years tensions have risen, causing the International Organization for Migration to offer Haitians $50 each plus additional relocation assistance to return to Haiti. More than 1,500 have accepted that assistance and returned.

=== 2013 court case ===
In 2013, the Dominican Constitutional Court issued Judgment 168-13, more commonly referred to as La Sentencia. The ruling reinterpreted the 1929 Dominican Constitution which granted automatic jus soli, or birth right citizenship to all people born in the Dominican Republic, regardless of national origin, race, or parental immigration status. The ruling invalidated jus soli citizenship and thus removed citizenship from an estimated 60,000-200,000 people living in the Dominican Republic, many of whom are of Haitian descent. The case followed the 2010 Dominican Constitution that formally prohibited nationality for children of those ‘residing illegally’ and decades of Haitian migration to the Dominican Republic, primarily for labor.

The judgment rendered many people stateless, meaning they were not recognized as citizens by any country. The ruling has been heavily criticized by many human rights organizations, namely Human Rights Watch and The Inter-American Commission on Human Rights, for violations of rights such as loss of access to education, employment, and legal identity.

In response to international pressure, the Dominican Congress passed Law 169-14 in 2014, establishing a route to naturalized nationality. The law created two categories: those previously registered as citizens and those never registered as citizens. Previously registered people were eligible to regain nationality. Those who never registered as citizens could apply for naturalization after two years of legal residence. Human rights monitors noted that implementation was limited and many people of Haitian descent remained without documentation or legal status and cite ‘antihaitismo’, a deeply rooted anti-Haitian sentiment among Dominicans, as a cause for this policy.

=== Border disputes ===
==== Border wall ====
In February 2023, construction was started on a border wall that will cover 164 kilometers (102 miles) of the 392-kilometer (244 miles) border with Haiti. The project includes 70 watchtowers and 41 access gates for patrolling containing fiber optics for communications, movement sensors, cameras, radars and drones. This $32 million project will be the second longest border wall in the Americas, after the US-Mexico wall. Proposals for a wall came from several Dominican politicians, including Ramfis Trujillo, grandson of Dominican dictator Rafael Trujillo, and current president Luis Abinader, as a measure to reduce irregular migration from Haiti and smuggling. The idea is supported by the majority of the Dominican population. Dominican officials claim the wall will slow the illegal drug trade and reduce the chance of gang violence in Haiti from spreading to the Dominican Republic. The project is controversial, with claims that it will do little to reduce illegal migration, will encourage bribery of Dominican Republic soldiers, and will become a source of conflict. The wall is being built in Dominican Republic territory, allowing DR soldiers to patrol on both sides.

==== Dajabón river issue ====
In August 2018, Haiti began construction of the Pittobert irrigation canal on the Binational Dajabón river. The Dominican Republic raises concerns about possible river flow reduction, and in 2021, alleges the construction of the Pittobert irrigation canal in Haiti violates the 1929 Treaty of Peace, Friendship and Arbitration between the two countries. This stance is based on the non-consultative nature of the canal and the fact its plans involve a diversion of the binational river, which forms the entire northernmost part of the border between the Dominican Republic and Haiti. However, a study by the Dominican National Institute of Hydraulic Resources (INDHRI) found that the Pittobert canal’s extractions would still be below the extractions made on the Dominican side.

In April 2021, Dominican soldiers gained illegal entrance into Haiti to stop the construction. The Dominican government applied pressure with threats, and the work was stopped shortly before the assassination of President Jovenel Moïse. Then, in August 2023, a peasant movement and the Assembly of Communal Sections (ASEC) restarted construction. Hundreds of Haitians volunteered as workers and held mass vigils. Jesuit priests and leftist organizations who work on the Dominican border have both spoken out in favor of fair use of the Dajabón River water by both countries. They also denounced mining exploitation plans that consume and contaminate enormous amounts of water, set to take place in the same Dominican border province of Dajabón (as the Pittobert irrigation canal). In response to the continued construction of the Pittobert canal, the Dominican Republic greenlit the upstream Don Miguel Dam in 2023 in order to control downstream water supply.

== Cultural and economic relations ==
=== Cultural and economic factors ===
Though relations since then have improved, the two countries remain deeply divided on demographic, political, racial, cultural and economic lines. Haiti's political situation is volatile, and the economy of the Dominican Republic is ten times larger than that of Haiti, prompting many Haitians to move to the DR seeking better opportunities, where they are often the subject of discrimination. In the mid-twentieth century, the economies of the two countries were comparable. Since that time, the Dominican economy has grown while the Haitian economy has diminished. The economic downturn in Haiti has been the result of factors such as internal power struggles, rapid population growth, environmental degradation, and trade embargoes. Today, Haiti is the poorest country in the Western Hemisphere. There is a lack of resources, and Haiti's population density exceeds its neighbor's by far. Despite the UN sending missions since the 1990s, in order to maintain peace, terrible conditions persist.

One large contributor to cultural dissonance is the language barrier, as Spanish is the primary language spoken in the eastern part of Hispaniola (Dominican Republic) while French and Haitian Creole are spoken in the western part (Haiti). Race is another defining factor of Dominican–Haitian relations. The ethnic composition of the Dominican population is 70% mixed race, 18% white, and 12% black; while 95% of the Haitian population is black. The Dominican economy is also over 1000% larger than the Haitian economy. The divergence between the level of economic development between Haiti and the Dominican Republic makes their border the one with the highest contrast of all Western world borders and it is evident that the Dominican Republic has one of the highest illegal migration issues in the Americas.

=== Haitian migration in the Dominican Republic ===
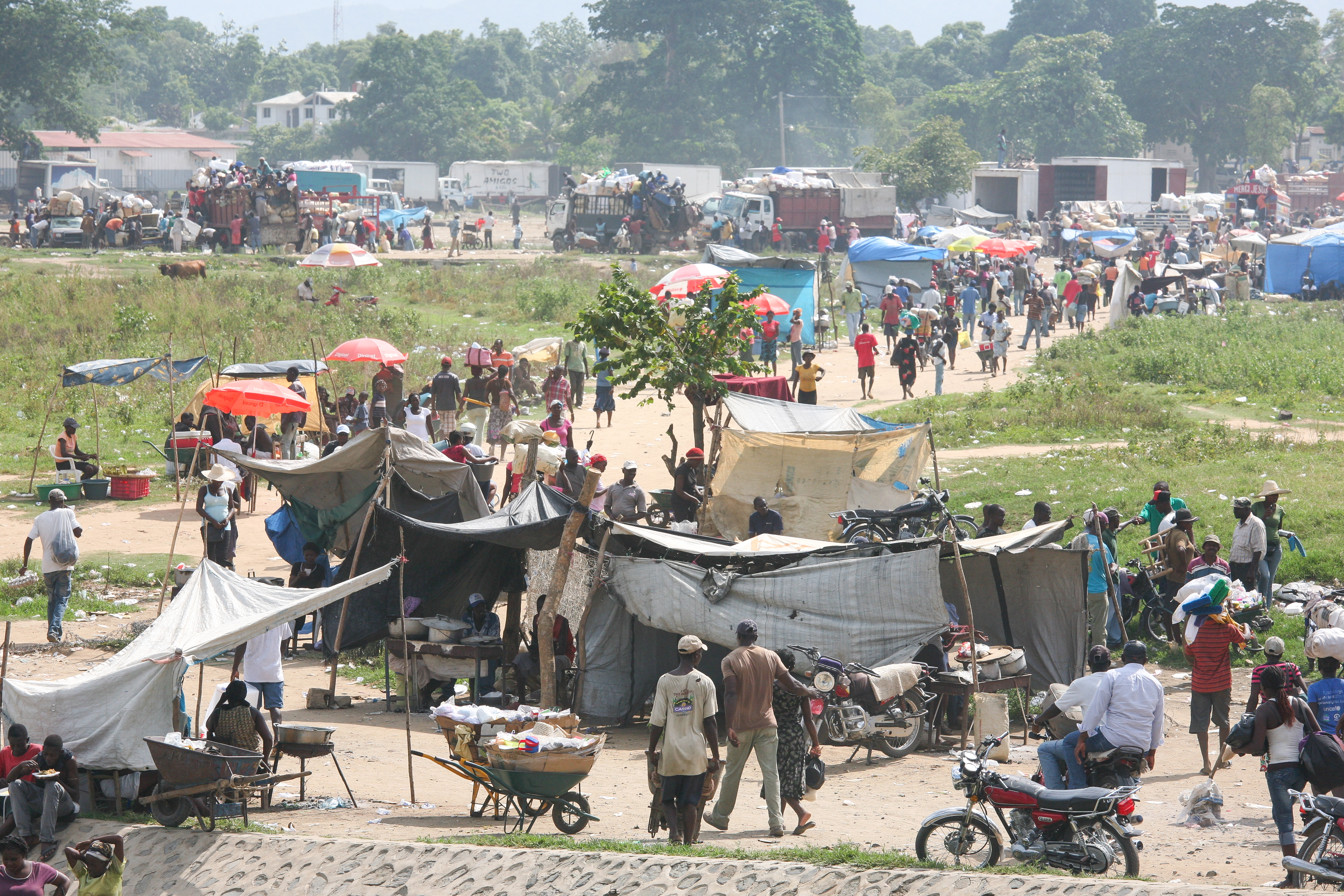
Haitians at the border between Haiti and the Dominican Republic.

Some cross-border cooperation exists in areas such as health, business, and infrastructure. Many Haitians travel to the Dominican Republic to find seasonal or long-term work to send remittances to their families. Some of these Haitian workers, as well as Dominicans of Haitian descent have reported complaints of discrimination against them by the Dominican majority population. Other Haitians who would seek work, instead remain in Haiti, fearing discrimination on the other side of the border.

Migration has been taking place since the 1920s, when Haitian laborers were actively encouraged to come work in the thriving Dominican sugar industry. With modernization from the 1960s on, fewer workers were required, and other Dominican industries and services started employing more Haitian workers, often an inexpensive, less regulated labor source with fewer legal protections. Many Haitian women find work in Dominican households, and Haitian men at Dominican construction sites, often leading to the move of an entire family.

A large number of migrated Haitian workers have continued to live in the Dominican Republic over several generations. The two governments have been unable to agree upon a legal framework to address the nationality of these descendants, leaving around one million people of Haitian ancestry in the Dominican Republic effectively stateless, restricting their access to health care, education and employment opportunities.

Though migration from Haiti to the Dominican Republic is economically beneficial to both countries, it is one of the leading contributors to tension between the two countries as well; illegal immigration from Haiti resonates high dissonance with the Dominican people. It has led to anti-Haitian feelings and mistrust of the Haitian people. Another problem with Haitian migration into Dominican Republic is that it blurs the line of citizenship. This factor of migration affects not only Dominican economy but its culture as well.

Travel across the border used to be quite easy, with daily bus service from Santo Domingo to both Haiti's north and south coasts. Much of the frontier was very open until the 2020s, with regular crossings to markets on either side. It is possible to drive much of the line and one unfenced north–south highway actually straddles the border. In September 2023, the Dominican Republic decided to close its border with Haiti following a water rights dispute.

=== Sports ===
In 2016, the baseball federations of the Dominican Republic and Haiti agreed to develop and promote baseball in Haiti (especially at the border), on the basis that sport is a developmental element to foster peace, as well as strengthening friendship and mutual respect between the two peoples. With the support of the Dominican ministry of Sports, the president of the Dominican Baseball Federation (FEDOBE) was thankful and quoted saying "it allows our federation to fulfill the dream of helping Haiti in baseball." He has pledged to put the Haitian Baseball Federation in relation to the international organizations. Coaches will be sent to Haiti for technical courses, referees and scorers by the Dominican Baseball Federation, while the Haitian Federation will support the logistics in the training and training programs.

== Resident diplomatic missions ==
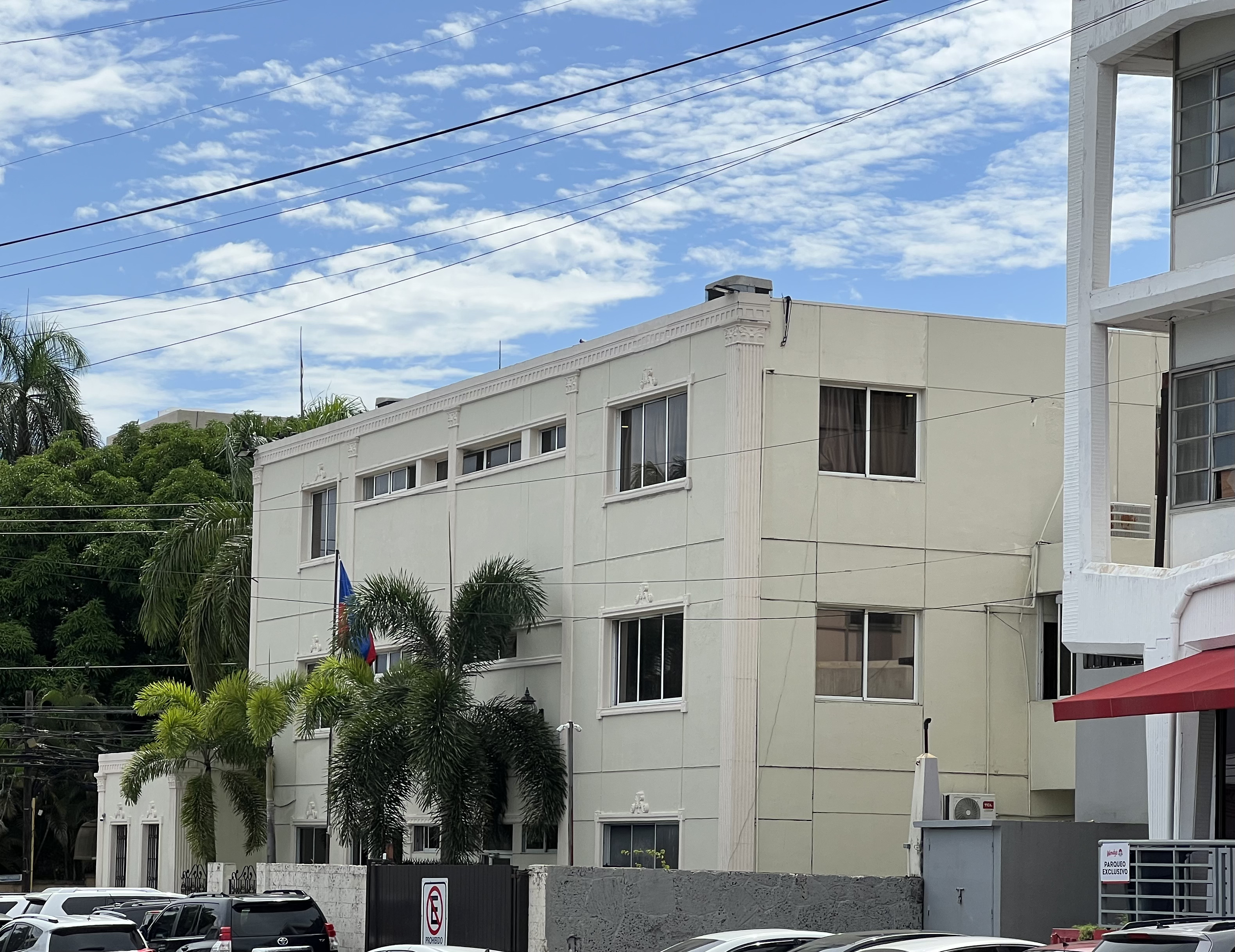
Embassy of Haiti in Santo Domingo

- Dominican Republic has an embassy in Port-au-Prince and consulates-general in Anse-à-Pitres, Belladère, Cap-Haïtien and Ouanaminthe.
- Haiti has an embassy in Santo Domingo and consulates-general in Barahona, Dajabón, Higüey and Santiago de los Caballeros.

== See also ==
- Dominican Republic–Haiti border

== Footnotes ==
=== Works cited ===
- Clodfelter, Micheal (2017). Warfare and Armed Conflicts: A Statistical Encyclopedia of Casualty and Other Figures, 1492-2015 (4th ed.). McFarland.
- Léger, Jacques Nicolas (1907). Haiti: Her History and Her Detractors. The Neale Publishing Company.
- Marley, David (2005). Historic Cities of the Americas: An Illustrated Encyclopedia. ABC-CLIO.
- Matibag, E. (2003). Haitian-Dominican Counterpoint: Nation, State, and Race on Hispaniola. Springer.
- Serra, José María [in Spanish] (1845). "Los Haitianos". El Dominicano. No. 1.
- Showalter, Dennis (2013). Imperial Wars 1815-1914. London: Amber Books. ISBN 978-1-78274-125-1. OCLC 1152285624.
- Smith, Matthew J. (2014). Liberty, Fraternity, Exile: Haiti and Jamaica after Emancipation. UNC Press Books.
