= Dominican training ship Juan Bautista Cambiaso =

Dominican Navy training ship

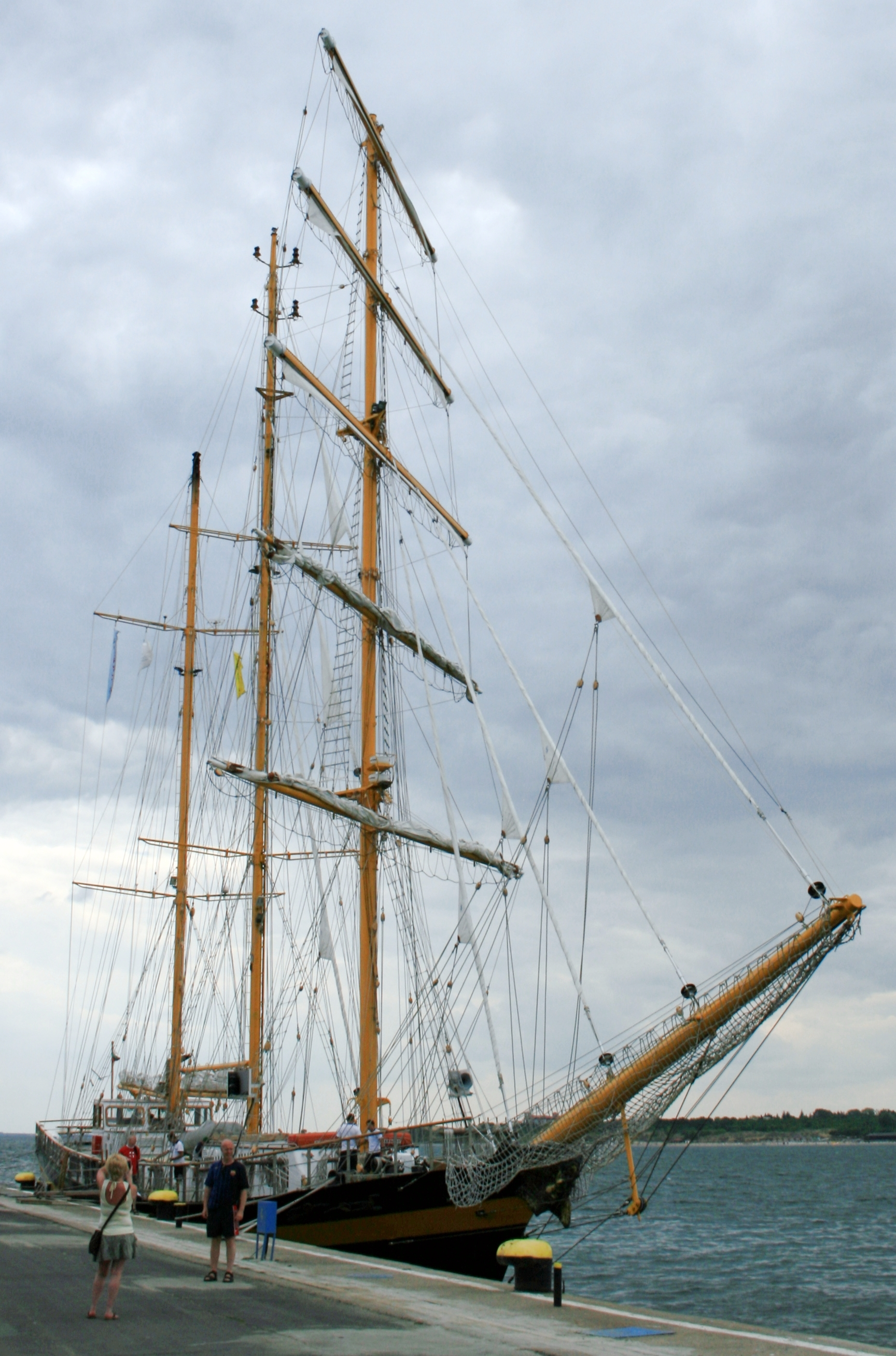
- Juan Bautista Cambiaso at port of Nesebar, Bulgaria (June 2010)

History

Dominican Republic
- Name: Almirante Juan Bautista Cambiaso
- Owner: Dominican Navy
- Port of registry: Santo Domingo, Dominican Republic
- Builder: MTG-Dolphin PLC, Varna/Bulgaria
- Launched: 29 August 2009
- Acquired: August 2018
- Renamed: August 2018
- Identification: IMO number: 9542271; MMSI number: 327801018; Call sign: HIWA
- Status: Active

General characteristics
- Length: 54 m (177 ft 2 in)
- Beam: 8 m (26 ft 3 in)
- Sail plan: three-masted barquentine; 16 sails, total sail area of 1,000 m^{2} (11,000 sq ft)

Juan Bautista Cambiaso (BE-01) is a training ship for the Dominican Navy. Launched in 2009, it is a three-masted barquentine (schooner barque) with a hull made of steel and a teak-covered deck. It is named after Genoese-born Dominican Admiral Juan Bautista Cambiaso, who founded the Dominican Navy in 1844.

== Description ==
Juan Bautista Cambiaso is a barquentine. She is 54 metres (177 ft 2 in) long with a beam of 8 metres (26 ft 3 in) and can accommodate up to 37 cadets for multiple-day journeys, with a permanent crew of 12.

Her callsign is HIWA and she is identified by the MMSI number 327801018.

== History ==
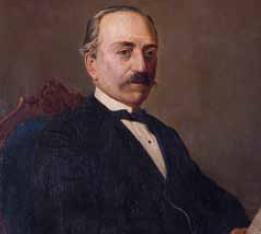
Juan Bautista Cambiaso (1820–1886), founder of the Dominican Navy

Juan Bautista Cambiaso was launched on 29 August 2009 in Varna, Bulgaria. The ship — originally named Royal Helena— was acquired by the Dominican Navy in August 2018 and named in honor of Admiral Juan Bautista Cambiaso, founder of the Dominican Navy, who defeated the Haitian Navy in the Battle of Tortuguero. During this engagement, a force of three Dominican schooners led by then-Commander Juan Bautista Cambiaso (at the helm of the flagship schooner Separación Dominicana) defeated a force of three warships of the Haitian Navy, ensuring naval supremacy for the newborn nation.

The ship replaced an earlier training ship of the same name, acquired from the Royal Canadian Navy in 1947. That ship, a corvette, had previously been named HMCS Belleville. It was scrapped by the Dominican Navy in 1972.

The ship appeared in the 2016 Black Sea Tall Ships Regatta, 2017 Tall Ships Regatta, and 2017 Tall Ship Races. On 20 June 2017 she struck the docked Spanish replica ship Victoria, while entering the port of Oudeschild, Netherlands. There were no reports of injuries in this incident.

For a short period in 2018 after the acquisition by the Dominican Navy, the vessel was named Maria Trinidad Sanchez.. María Trinidad Sánchez is a heroine from the independence wars of the Dominican Republic.

Additionally, Juan Bautista Cambiaso has played a part in Dominican international relations, and is used as an "Ambassador of the Seas of the World" by the Dominican Navy. In July 2023, the ship made a port call in Jamaica, strengthening ties between the two nations.
