= Cambiaso Hermanos =

Chilean food and household products company

- Native name: Cambiaso Hermanos S.A.C.
- Formerly: Vallarino y Cambiaso; Antonio Cambiaso e Hijos
- Industry: Food and household products
- Founded: 1875
- Founders: Antonio Cambiaso Lavagetto; Juan Bautista Cambiaso
- Headquarters: Avenida Brasil 2492, Valparaíso, Chile
- Area served: Chile
- Products: Tea, cereals, cleaning products
- Brands: Té Supremo; Adelgazul; Aluplast; Superior
- Website: www.cambiaso.cl

Cambiaso Hermanos (legally Cambiaso Hermanos S.A.C.) is a Chilean food and household products company based in Valparaíso. Founded in 1875, it produces and markets products including tea, cereals and household goods. Its brands include Té Supremo, Superior and Aluplast. In 2008, Diario Financiero described the company as one of Unilever's main competitors in Chile, and Tea Journey later listed Cambiaso Hermanos, through Supremo Tea, among the leading brands in the Chilean tea market. The company marked its 150th anniversary in 2025.

== History ==
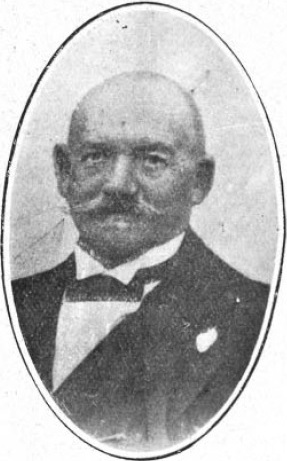
Antonio Cambiaso.

The company was founded in 1875 as Vallarino y Cambiaso by the Italian immigrants Antonio Cambiaso Lavagetto and his uncle Juan Bautista Cambiaso, both from Genoa. Spanish-language sources state that the business was also established in the Dominican Republic, where Antonio's brother Luis Cambiaso served as Italy's consul. Juan Bautista later returned to the Dominican Republic, where he participated in the founding of the Dominican Navy, while Antonio continued the Chilean business with his sons under the name Antonio Cambiaso e Hijos.

After Antonio Cambiaso's death in 1917, his sons Juan, Ernesto, Luis and Carlos Cambiaso Denegri renamed the firm Cambiaso Hermanos. In 1921, the company established the El Vergel preserves factory. In 1943, the brothers divided their business interests, with Luis and Carlos remaining in charge of the original Valparaíso-based company, which was reorganized as a joint-stock company in 1950.

In the early 1960s, the company went through a crisis after the deaths of Luis and Carlos Cambiaso Denegri, and management passed to Luis Cambiaso Ropert and Mónica Cambiaso Ropert, children of Luis Cambiaso Denegri. In 1964, the company began selling packaged tea, which later became its signature product; brands associated with that line included La Rendidora and Té Supremo. Through its Supremo brand, Cambiaso became a sponsor of Teletón in 1978, and in 2015 its Superior garbage-bag brand was added as another sponsoring brand.

In 1983, the company entered the plastics business by producing its own tea packaging, later expanding into bags and other packaging products. It subsequently diversified its product range and began international expansion. In 2001, it created its U.S. subsidiary, Cambiaso Brothers. In 2004, as part of that diversification process, the company acquired consumer-product assets and brands from Alufoil S.A., including Alufoil and Aluplast. It later acquired Parro, Alvariño y Cía. Ltda., owner of the Samba and Aroma tea brands. One of the company's owners, Mónica Cambiaso Ropert, died on 28 January 2011.

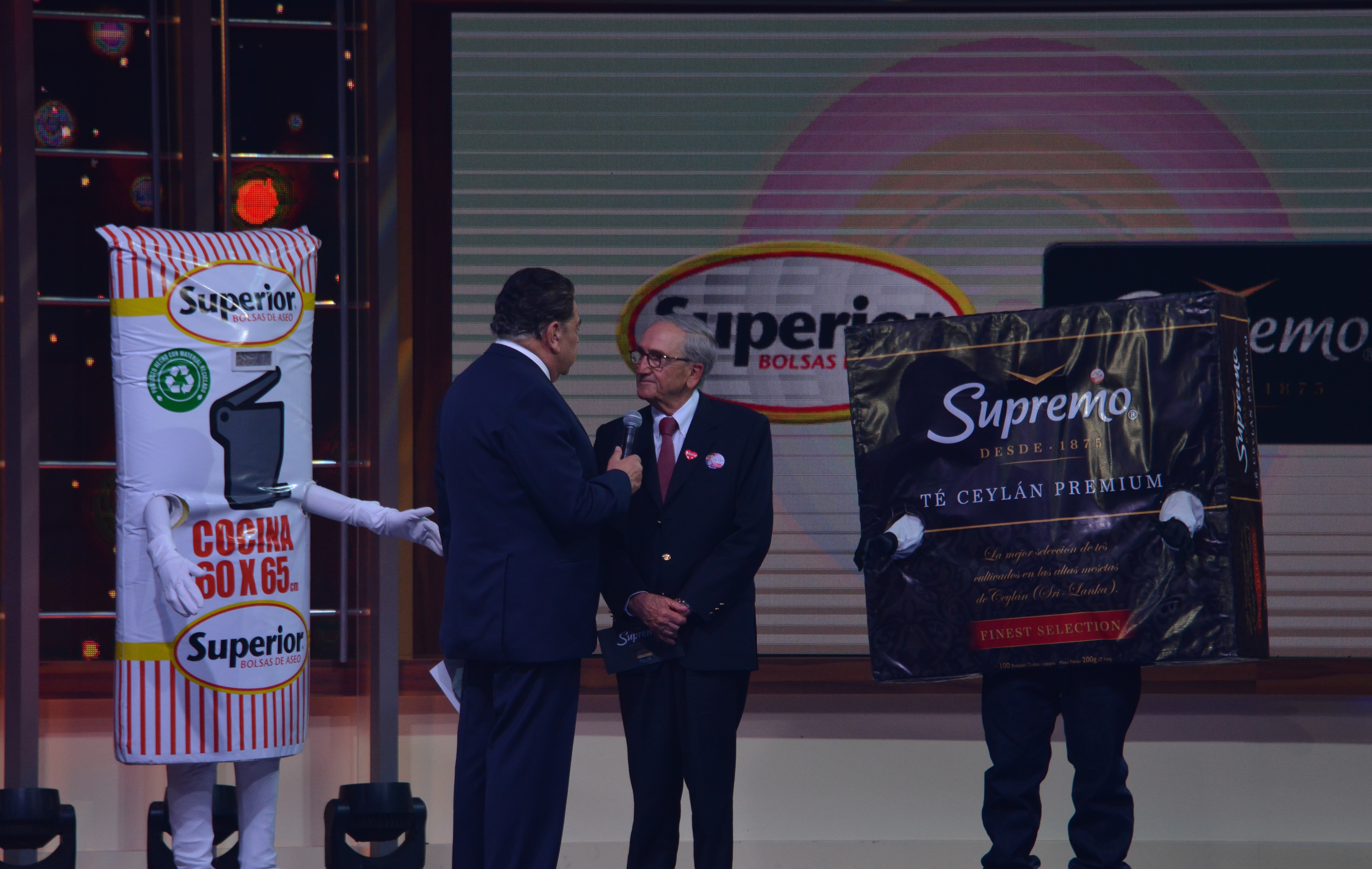
Luis Cambiaso (right) with Don Francisco during the company's donation announcement at Teletón in 2017. The mascots of Superior and Té Supremo are also shown.

On 15 June 2014, a fire destroyed the company's main plant in Placilla, Valparaíso. After the disaster, the company imported tea from Sri Lanka and acquired new machines so that packaging could continue in Chile.
