= Juan Alejandro Acosta =

Dominican military commander (1813–1886)

Admiral Juan Alejandro Acosta
- Born: Juan Alejandro Acosta Bustamante c. 1813; Baní, Captaincy General of Santo Domingo
- Died: April 2, 1886 (aged 72–73); Santo Domingo, Dominican Republic
- Burial place: National Pantheon of the Dominican Republic
- Military career
- Allegiance: Dominican Republic
- Branch: Dominican Navy; Dominican Army
- Service years: 1844–1856
- Rank: Admiral
- Conflicts: Dominican War of Independence; Battle of Tortuguero

Juan Alejandro Acosta Bustamante (1813 – April 2, 1886) was born in Baní into a locally prominent family. At the age of sixteen, Acosta became a good friend of Juan Pablo Duarte. Acosta became a member of the secret patriotic society, La Trinitaria (The Trinity). He commanded the brigantine Leonor, the first ship to fly the Dominican flag. Acosta commanded various Dominican warships during the Dominican War of Independence. He opposed annexation of the Dominican Republic to another nation and was expelled from the Dominican Republic by Buenaventura Báez. He died in poverty.

== Early years ==
He was born in Baní, Dominican Republic in 1813, during the España Boba era. He is the son of Francisco Acosta and María Baltasara de los Reyes. Committed to the activities of the Triniatrios, he signed the Dominican Act of Independence (1844).

== Participation in the Dominican Navy ==
At the time of the Haitian capitulation, on February 28, 1844, he had to allay fears that worried the residents of Monte Grande about the abolition of slavery in the process that had begun. He was founder of the Dominican Navy along with Juan Bautista Cambiaso. In March, he piloted the schooner La Leonor, which interrupted Juan Pablo Duarte's exile in Curaçao; That was the first time he waved the Dominican flag on foreign beaches. When President Jean-Louis Pierrot decreed a patent of marque against the Navy, it was able to survive due to the expertise of its founders.

== Later military career ==
He distinguished himself in different naval combats. In 1849, he led the offensive squadron against Faustin Soulouque's positions in Petit Riviere, Dame Marie and in the Keys Inlet. He later participated on the revolutionary side in July 1857 against Buenaventura Báez in the Cibaeño Revolution. Some several years later, when Pedro Santana proclaimed the annexation to Spain in March 1861, disagreeing with his military chief's move, he remained neutral. A decade later, On November 9, 1871, in Curacao, he supported Pedro Antonio Pimentel by signing a manifesto against the annexation to the United States that Báez intended to make.

== Death ==
He died in Santo Domingo in 1886 with the rank of brigadier general.
