= 1895 Dominican Republic arbitration referendum =

Referendum in the Dominican Republic

A four-part referendum on arbitration over a border dispute with Haiti was held in the Dominican Republic on 2 June 1895. Voters were asked whether an arbitration tribunal should be established, whether Pope Leo XIII would be an appropriate arbitrator, what compensation Haiti should receive if the outcome was favourable to the Dominican Republic, and whether the government should comply with the tribunal outcome if it was unfavourable to the Dominican Republic. All four proposals were approved by voters.

== Aftermath ==
As a result of the referendum, the two countries signed an arbitration agreement on 3 July 1895. However, the Vatican declined the request, noting that it was "restricted to the simple interpretation of Article 4 of the Treaty of 1874." Subsequently, the countries agreed to form a mixed demarcation commission on 28 May 1899.

== See also ==
- Dominican Republic–Haiti relations
