= María Chica =

Dominican naval vessel

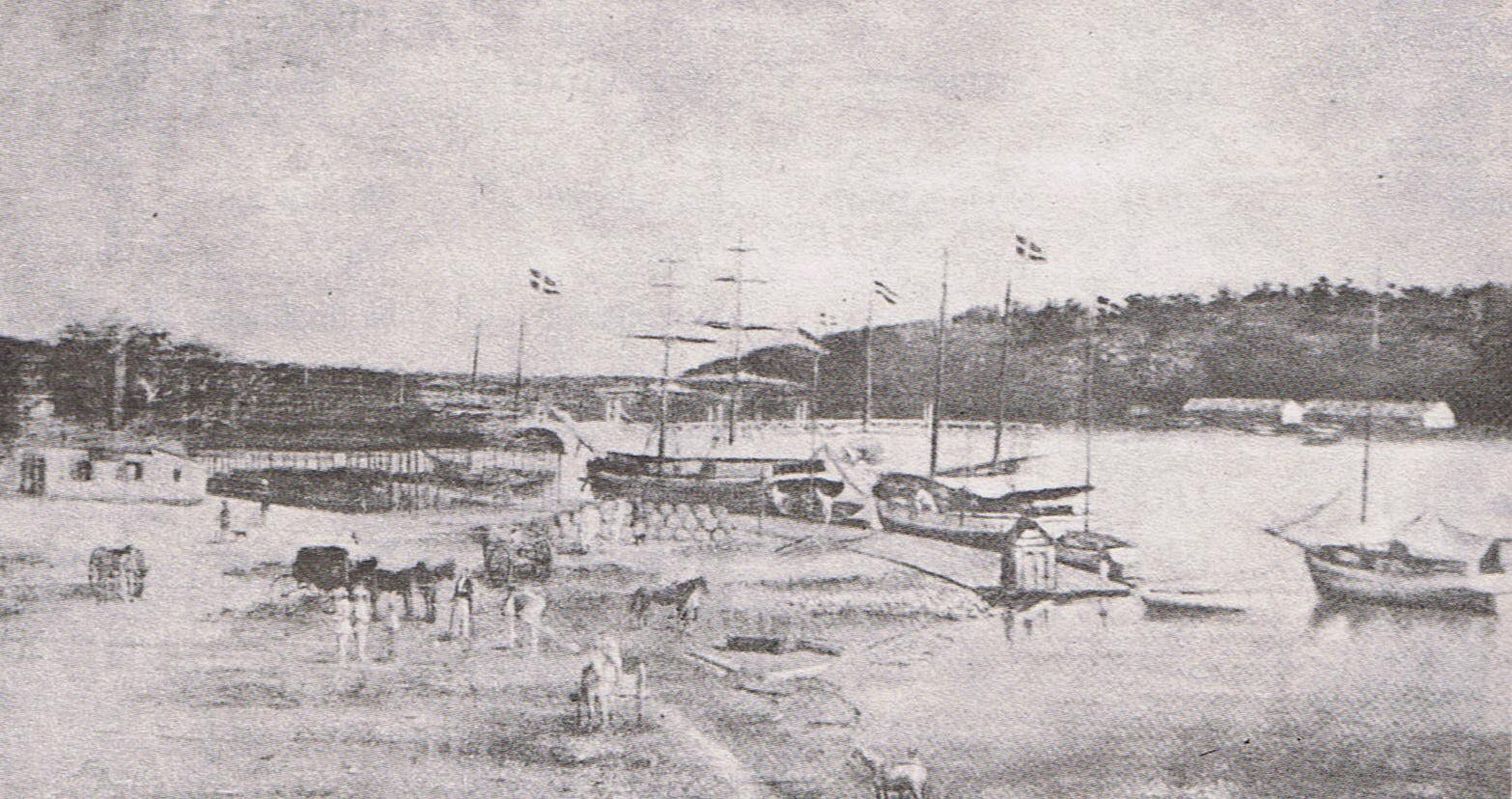

History

Dominican Republic
- Name: María Chica
- Acquired: April 13, 1844
- Commissioned: April 23, 1844
- Fate: Unknown

General characteristics
- Class & type: Schooner
- Tons burthen: 78
- Propulsion: Sail
- Armament: 3 × 4-pounder guns

The schooner María Chica was one of the first armed Dominican naval vessels of the Dominican War of Independence and is claimed to be one of the founding vessels of the Dominican Navy, alongside Separación Dominicana (flagship) and Leonor. She was captained by Commander Juan Bautista Maggiolo during the Dominican War of Independence. Before the war, the schooner was owned by Catalan merchants José and Francisco Ginebra.

== Bibliography ==
- Windt Lavandier, César de; García Alecont, Víctor Francisco; Ventura Domínguez, Albérico (1992). La Marina en la Guerra de Independencia Dominicana [The Navy in the Dominican War of Independence] (in Spanish). Santo Domingo: Centros APEC de Educación a Distancia.

== See also ==
- Battle of Tortuguero
- Dominican Navy
