= Battle of Tortuguero =

1844 battle of the Dominican War of Independence

- Part of the Dominican War of Independence
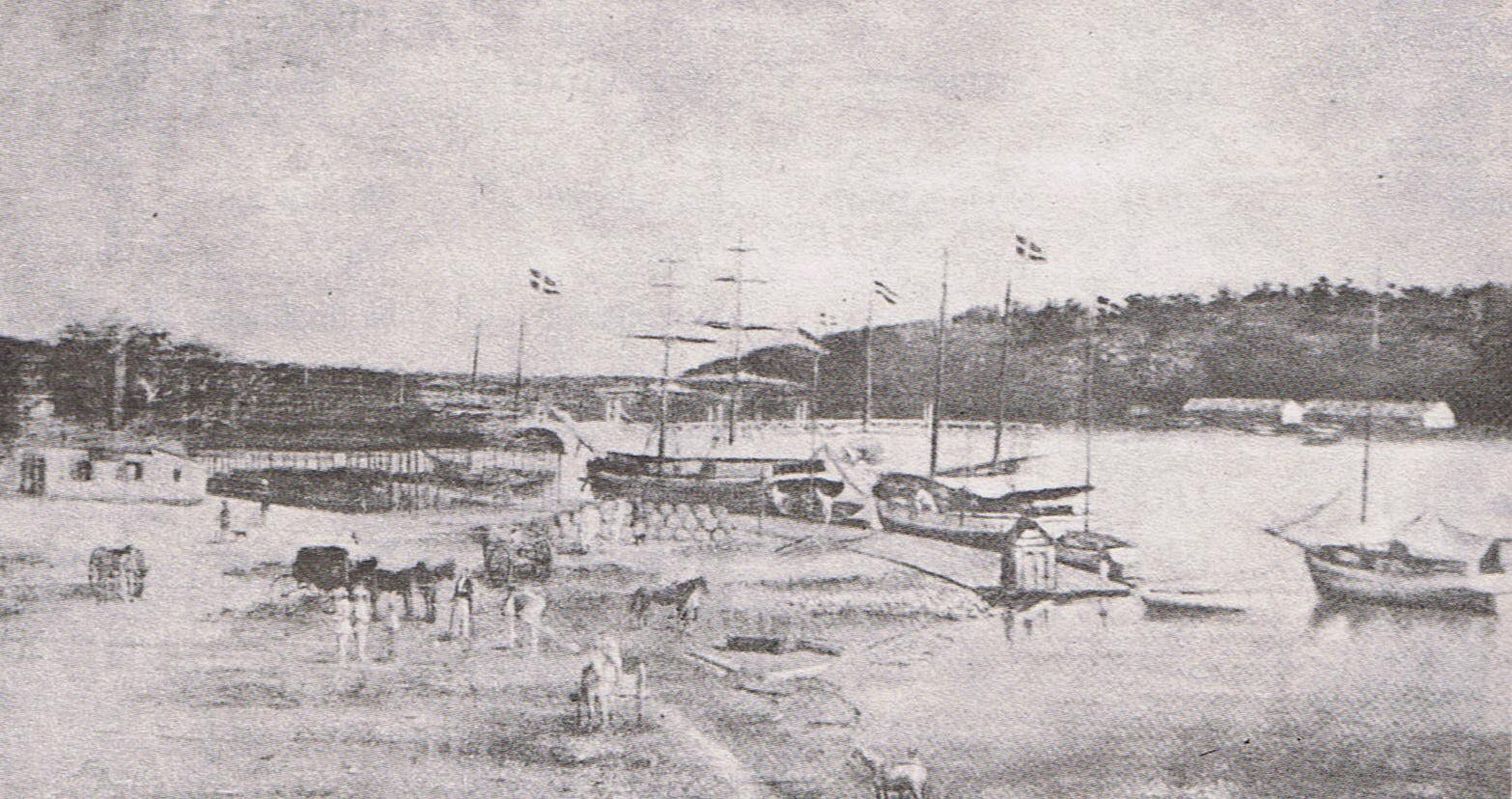
- The three Dominican schooners later on in Santo Domingo circa 1850.
| Date | 15 April 1844 |
| Location | Puerto Tortuguero, Azua Province |
| Result | Dominican victory |

Belligerents
| Dominican Republic | Haiti |

Commanders and leaders
| Comm. Juan Bautista Cambiaso; Capt. Juan Bautista Maggiolo; Lt. Juan Alejandro Acosta | (Haiti) Unknown |

Strength
| 3 schooners (Separación Dominicana, María Chica, and San José) | 1 brigantine (Pandora); 2 schooners (La Mouche and Le Signifie) |

Casualties and losses
| None | 1 brigantine sunk 2 schooners sunk |

The Battle of Tortuguero (Spanish: Batalla de Tortuguero) was the first naval battle of the Dominican War of Independence and was fought on 15 April 1844 at Tortuguero, Azua Province. A force of three Dominican schooners led by Commander Juan Bautista Cambiaso defeated a force of three vessels of the Haitian Navy. Though it was a minor naval battle engagement, it determined the naval supremacy of the Dominican Republic over Haiti until the end of the war.

== Prelude to battle ==
On March 31, 1844, news from French Admiral Alphonse Louis Théodore de Mogès from the frigate La Neréide, warned of a flotilla of Haitian vessels that had been raiding the coast of the Ocoa Bay and transporting supplies to the Haitian Army in Azua. He recommended President Tomás Bobadilla of the Central Government Board, to order all ships in Santo Domingo be used for war. Conscripts for the new navy gathered at Puerta de la Misericordia, among them were Juan Alejandro Acosta, José Antonio Sanabia, Joaquín Orta, Teodoro Ariza, Pedro Tomás Garrido y Fermín González.

Acosta, together with some fellow merchants, armed two schooners. Acosta received the schooner Eleonore (renamed San José) from the British merchant Abraham Cohen and was followed by the Genoese merchant Juan Bautista Maggiolo who received the schooner María Chica from the Catalan merchants José and Francisco Ginebra. Both schooners set sail in early April to Aguas de la Estancia, Baní to meet there with Commander Juan Bautista Cambiaso, another Genoese merchant.

== The battle ==
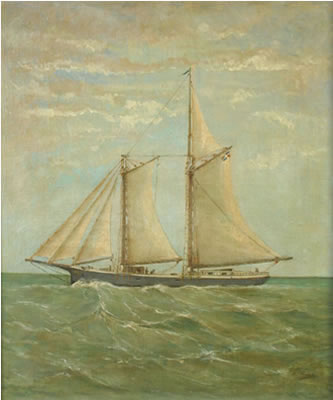
Schooner Separación Dominicana during the battle, by Adolfo García Obregón.

On April 13, 1844 three schooners led by Commander Juan Bautista Cambiaso set sail from Aguas de la Estancia. Cambiaso leading the schooner Separación Dominicana (flagship), the Captain Maggiolo led the María Chica and Lieutenant Acosta led the San José.

Two days later, on 15 April 1844 Commander Cambiaso sighted three vessels off shore bombarding Puerto Tortuguero, Azua. The three vessels were the Pandora, La Mouche and Le Signifie. Cambiaso quickly decided to engage the fleet and after a combination of manoeuvres the enemy succumbed. All three enemy vessels were sunk. Almost all sailors died in the battle and there is no record of any survivor from the sinkings.

== Aftermath ==
News from this victory travelled fast and on 23 April 1844 the Junta Central Gubernativa authorised to incorporate these three schooners in the newly created Dominican Navy, and Commander Cambiaso was appointed to the rank of Admiral. Haitian presence at sea vanished after this engagement, which ensured naval supremacy for the newborn nation.

== Bibliography ==
- "Imperial Wars 1815–1914". The Encyclopedia of Warfare. Amber Books Ltd. 2013. ISBN 9781782741251.
