= Juan Bautista Cambiaso =

Genoese-Dominican sailor, founder of the Dominican Navy (1820–1886)

Admiral Juan Bautista Cambiaso
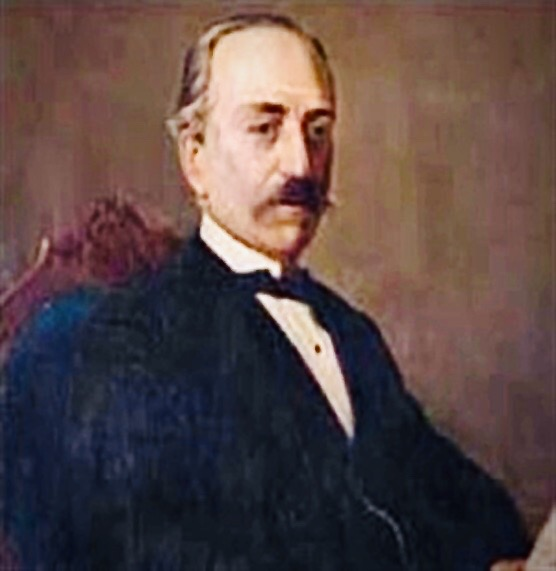
- Portrait of Juan Bautista Cambiaso
- Born: Giuseppe Giovanni Battista Cambiaso; September 12, 1820; Genoa, Savoyard State
- Died: June 21, 1886 (aged 65); Santo Domingo, Dominican Republic
- Burial place: National Pantheon of the Dominican Republic
- Military career
- Allegiance: Dominican Republic
- Branch: Dominican Navy; Dominican Army
- Service years: 1844–1856
- Rank: Admiral; Divisional general
- Conflicts: Dominican War of Independence; Battle of Tortuguero

Juan Bautista Cambiaso (September 12, 1820 – June 21, 1886), né Giuseppe Giovanni Battista Cambiaso, was a Genoese-born sailor and soldier, best known for helping establish the naval forces of the nascent Dominican Republic during its war of emancipation. He was the first admiral of the Dominican Navy and is considered its founder.

Throughout the Dominican War of Independence, which lasted 12 years, Cambiaso was a front-line soldier always in defense of the newly formed Dominican Republic. Later, after returning to his commercial activities, he served as Consul of Italy in the country. He was a distinguished municipality and an authentic Hero of National Independence.

Today, the Dominican Navy remembers Cambiaso by mentioning his name in its anthem along with another Italian, Juan Bautista Maggiolo who, like him, threw himself inti the front lines to maintain the independence of the Dominican Republic. The sailboat training ship of the Dominican Navy also bears the name of the First Admiral, Juan Bautista Cambiaso. His mortal remains rest in the National Pantheon of the Dominican Republic, along with the venerable ashes of the other heroes and martyrs of the Dominican Republic.

== Early years ==
Juan Bautista Cambiaso was born Giuseppe Giovanni Battista Cambiaso on 12 September 1820 in Genoa, then part of the duchy of the same name.

It is not known when he came to the country together with his brother Luis Cambiaso Chiozzone from Italy. He stayed permanently living in Santo Domingo, where he raised a family and joined the different days waged by the Dominicans. He gradually established himself in Santo Domingo during the later stages of the period of Haitian rule over Hispaniola, where he made a living through commerce and came to sympathize with the Trinitarios' cause for secession.

== Dominican War of Independence ==
After independence was declared on 27 February 1844 and after learning that a Haitian flotilla was bombarding towns along the southwestern coast, the Junta Central Gubernativa (revolutionary government committee) ordered the seizing of the port of Santo Domingo and all vessels flying the Haitian colors therein. Cambiaso, who had learned seamanship in his homeland, was given command of the schooner Separación Dominicana.

On 15 April 1844, a flotilla with Separación Dominicana as flagship, comprising schooners San José and María Chica, engaged the Haitian vessels and sank two schooners and a brigantine on waters outside the town of Puerto Tortuguero. On 23 April, the Junta proclaimed Cambiaso Admiral of the newly formed naval force (Marina de Guerra de la República).

On 3 September 1844, he brought prisoners from Puerto Plata on the Separación Dominicana, among them was Juan Pablo Duarte, Juan Isidro Pérez and other Trinitarios, after being declared traitors to the Homeland on the order General Pedro Santana.

Colonel Cambiaso went in December 1844 to Petite Marie, Curacao, to look for the ship General Santana, which was under repair on that island.

He participated very actively in the campaign of 1845. He contributed to the victory of the Battle of Beler, attacking the enemy in Bari-Barú with the flotilla that he commanded.

The Navy's assistance would prove vital to the patriot Army during the 1849 campaign, and thanks to it victory was achieved at Las Carreras and El Número. By repelling enemy vessels and providing logistic support and transportation for troops, the patriots were able to liberate the southern region of the island as far as the frontier with Haiti proper.

On 6 January 1856, he helped rout a Haitian host at El Can, Barahona, and for this deed he was promoted to Divisional general of the Army.

== Retirement and death ==
After retiring from the military, Cambiaso returned to Santo Domingo and dedicated the rest of his life to his mercantile business. He died there on 21 June 1886, aged 66.

== Physiognomy and Character ==
Historian José Gabriel García said the following about him:

Dominican, this good man, by naturalization, since he was Italian by birth, not only helped create what should be his adoptive homeland and the legitimate homeland of his children, but he also had the enviable glory, in his capacity as a skilled and experienced sailor, of laying the first bases of what was once the Dominican flotilla, a naval force that, if due to its special conditions would not have served to dispute the dominion of the seas with any maritime power, was enough to parade the crossed flag with honor through Haitian waters and defend our coasts from the cowardly attacks of the enemy. It is famous that, encouraged by the enthusiasm with which he greeted the wonderful appearance of his second homeland, he improvised famous privateers equipped with all the rules of art from inadequate merchant ships as if by magic; and that from simple coastal ship skippers he formed in a short time honorable and brave naval officers, who always knew how to keep the dignity of the nation high; important services that would have been enough for Dominican society, grateful for its generous benefactor, to place him among others equally valuable, eager to be more useful every day to the land where he had found frank hospitality and sincere affections like family...

== See also ==
- Dominican War of Independence
- Dominican Navy
- Juan Bautista Cambiaso (ship)
