= Dominican Navy =

- Armada de Republica Dominicana
- Founded: 15 April 1844
- Country: Dominican Republic
- Branch: Navy
- Type: Navy
- Size: 13,200 personnel, 34 ships
- Anniversaries: April 15
- Engagements: Dominican War of Independence; Dominican Civil War
- Website: armada.mil.do (in Spanish)

Commanders
- Current commander: Vice Admiral Juan Bienvenido Crisostomo Martínez
- Notable commanders: Admiral Juan Bautista Cambiaso

Insignia
- Naval Ensign

- Naval Jack

The Navy of the Dominican Republic (Spanish: Armada de Republica Dominicana (ARD)), is one of the three branches of the Armed Forces of the Dominican Republic, together with the Army and the Air Force.

== History ==
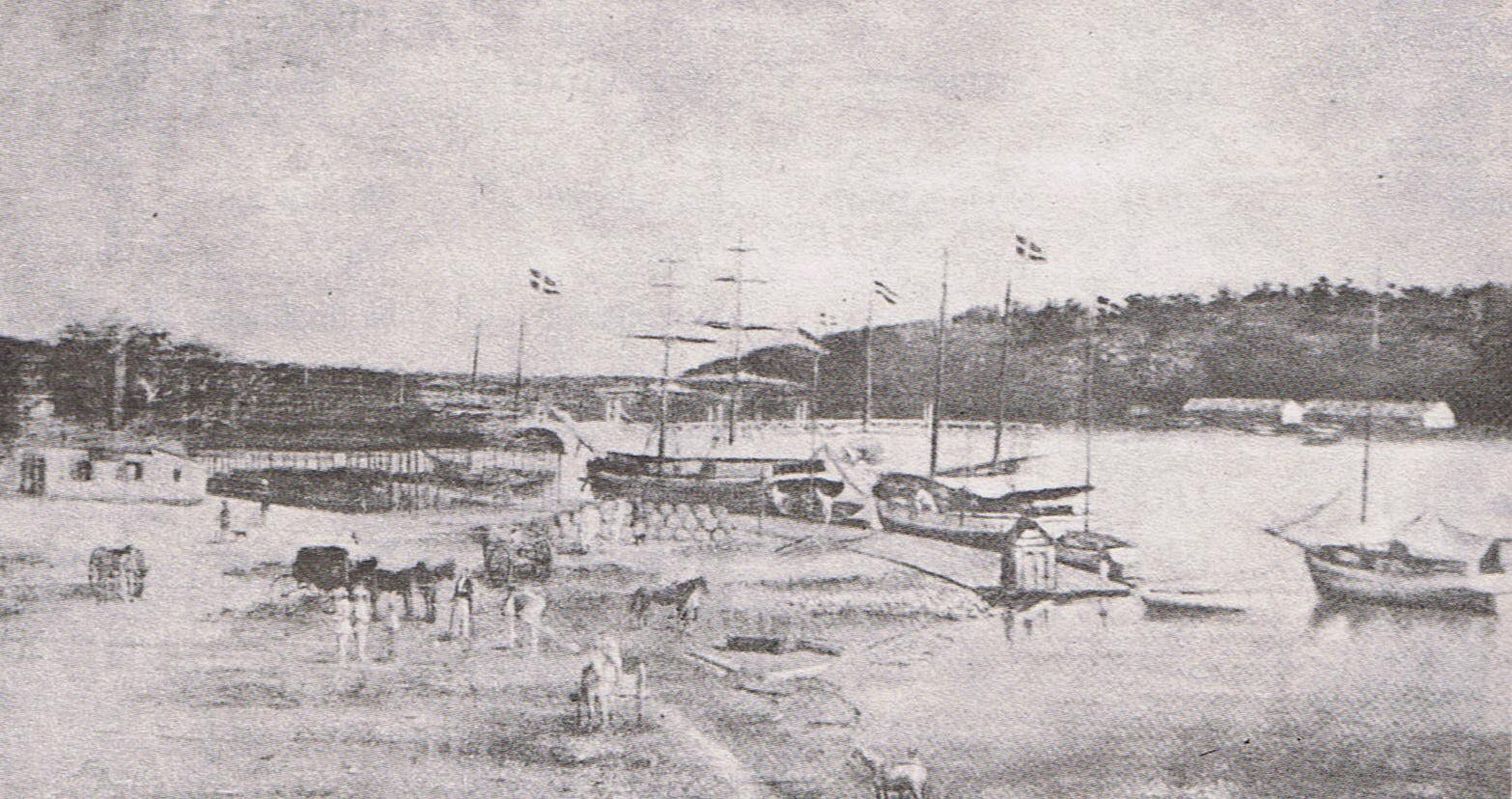
The three Dominican schooners later on in Santo Domingo circa 1850.

After the Dominican Republic gained its independence from Haiti on February 27, 1844, there was a need to create a naval fleet. Three schooners were commissioned for this, Separación Dominicana (flagship), María Chica and Leonor. These were the original three Dominican vessels which were incorporated in the newly created Dominican Navy as authorized by the Junta Central Gubernativa with the Naval Act of 1844 on April 23, 1844, the same day the Navy was created. Even though, the three schooners had been in action since April 15 at the Battle of Tortuguero, where they were led by Admiral Juan Bautista Cambiaso and sank six Haitian ships.

During the Dominican Civil War, a part of the Navy opposed the "Return to the Legitime Government" which was victim of a coup d'état in September 1963 and used the frigate Mella to bombard the National Palace with the help of the Air Force.

On the other side of the conflict, The elite navy force "Hombres Ranas" (Frog Men) under Commander Ramon Montes Arache, fought to bring the 1962 democratically elected president back in office. The other navy commanders were afraid of the "Hombres Ranas" taking control over Las Calderas Naval Base. See United States occupation of the Dominican Republic (1965–1966)

== Naval bases ==
The Navy maintains several naval stations and detachments, but has three main bases:

- Base Naval 27 de Febrero, located in the city of Santo Domingo, the Chief of Staff and the Naval Academy "Vice-Admiral Cesar de Windt Lavandier".
- Base Naval de Las Calderas, located in Peravia Province, is the largest naval base. The Bahia Las Calderas Naval Shipyard (ANABALCA) is located here. This shipyard is responsible for the maintenance of naval units of the fleet, as well as civilian vessels. Military and civilian vessels, such as tugs, boats, barges, pilot boats have also been built at this site.
- Base Naval Boca Chica, located in Boca Chica, 35 km east of Santo Domingo.

== List of current vessels ==
| Class | Name | Origin | In service | Notes | Image |
Patrol Division
| USCG seagoing buoy tender (Mesquite class) | PA-301 Almirante Didiez Burgos | United States | 1 | The flagship of the Dominican Navy, she was transferred by the United States Coast Guard (USCG) in 2001. She is used for coastal patrol, navigational aid maintenance, midshipman cruises, humanitarian assistance, naval training exercises, troop transport, and at sea refueling. She is armed with two M-2 0.50 caliber machine guns and two single Oerlikon 20 mm cannon, but can also be armed with two extra 0.50 cal. machine guns, two M60 machine guns and one 3/50 (single) gun. | PA-301 Almirante Didiez Burgos |
| White-class coastal buoy tender | PM-203 Tortuguero; PM-204 Capotillo | United States | 2 | Tortuguero and Capotillo were transferred to the Navy by the USCG in 1999 and in 2002, respectively. They are used for coastal patrol, navigational aids maintenance, midshipman cruises, humanitarian assistance, naval training exercises, and at sea refueling. They are armed with two M2 0.50 cal. machine guns. | PM-204 Capotillo |
| Tejo class Offshore Patrol Vessel | | Portugal | 4 on order | | |
Coast Guard Division
| Point-class cutters | GC-101 Aries; GC-105 Antares; GC-110 Sirius | United States | 2 | They are used for coastal patrol, search and rescue operations, anti-narcotics operations. They are armed with two M2 0.50 cal. machine guns. | GC-105 Antares |
| Seawart-class patrol boat | GC-103 Procion; GC-104 Aldebarán; GC-106 Bellatrix; GC-108 Capella | United States | 4 | They were acquired between 1968 and 1971. Between 2003 and 2005 they underwent a general renovation, receiving new engines, new generators, new radars, GPS navigation system, auto-pilot system, etc. They are used for coastal patrols, search and rescue operations, and anti-narcotics operations. They are armed with three M-2 0.50 cal. machine guns. | GC-106 Bellatrix |
| Swiftships 110'-class patrol boat | GC-107 Canopus; GC-109 Orión | United States | 2 | Built in 1984 by Swiftships shipbuilders. Between 2003 and 2005 they underwent a general renovation, receiving new engines, new generators, new radars, a GPS navigation system, and an auto-pilot system. They are used for coastal patrols, search and rescue operations, and anti-narcotics operations. They are armed with two M2 0.50 cal. machine guns, one Oerlikon 20 mm cannon (single) and one M60 machine gun. | GC-109 Orión |
| Swiftships 35-meter patrol boat | GC-112 Altair | United States | 1 | Built in 2003 by Swiftships shipbuilders. It is used for coastal patrols, search and rescue operations, and anti-narcotics operations. It is armed with two M2 0.50 cal. machine guns and one single-mounted Oerlikon 20 mm cannon. | GC-112 Altair |
| Swiftships 36 meter | GC-111 Centaurus | United States | 1 | Built in 1976 by Swiftships shipbuilders as a research vessel for the University of Delaware. The Dominican Navy acquired it in 2017. It is used for coastal patrols, search and rescue operations, and anti-narcotics operations. | EX-Hispaniola in Santo Domingo |
| Defiant-class patrol vessel | GC-102 Betelgeuse; GC-114 Arcturus | United States | 2 | Built by Metal Shark Shipbuilders. Used for coastal patrols, search and rescue operations, and anti-narcotics operations. | Defiant-class patrol boat |
Salvage and Rescue Unit
| Damen Stan Patrol 1500-class patrol boat | LR-151 Hamal; LR-152 Vega; LR-153 Deneb; LR-154 Acamar | Dominican Republic | 3 | These patrol boats were built in the Dominican Republic by Astilleros CIRAMAR in 2004. They are used for coastal patrols, search and rescue operations, anti-narcotics operations. These patrol boats are unarmed, but they carry M16 rifles and can be fitted with an M60 machine gun. | LR-153 Deneb |
Interceptor Boat Division
| 32' - 37' Justice Boston whaler-class boat | LI-155 Castor; LI-156 Pollux; LI-157 Atria; LI-158 Shaula; LI-159 Enif; LI-161 Elnath; LI-162 Polaris; LI-165 Regulus; LI-166 Denebola; LI-167 Acrux; LI-168 Rigel; LI-169 Algenib; LI-170 Becrux | United States | 13 | They are used for coastal and river patrols, search and rescue operations, anti-narcotics operations, and go-fast interdiction. Justice 32' can be armed with an M60 machine gun and Justice 37' with three M60 machine guns, and they carry small arms such as rifles and shotguns. | Elnath, Polaris and Nunki |
Auxiliary Vessels Division
| Damen Stan 2608-class tug | RM-2 Guarionex; RM-3 Guaroa | Dominican Republic | 2 | Built in the Dominican Republic by CIRAMAR. They are currently being operated on a lease by the company SVITZER Dominicana. | RM-3 Guaroa |
| LCU-1600-class landing craft utility | LD-31 Neyba | United States | 1 | | |
| Floating docks | DF-1 | United States | 1 | Operated by CIRAMAR. | |
Training
| Three-masted barquentine | BE-01 Juan Bautista Cambiaso | Bulgaria | 1 | Originally named Royal Helena, the ship was launched on 29 August 2009 in Varna, Bulgaria. She can accommodate up to 37 midshipmen for multiple-day journeys. In 2018 the ship was acquired by the Dominican Navy and renamed Juan Bautista Cambiaso. She is 54 metres (177 ft 2 in) long with a beam of 8 metres (26 ft 3 in). | BE-01 Juan Bautista Cambiaso |

== Ranks ==
=== Commissioned officer ranks ===
The rank insignia of commissioned officers.

| Rank group | General / flag officers | | | Senior officers | | | Junior officers |
|---|---|---|---|---|---|---|---|---|---|
| Dominican Navy |
| Dominican Navy | Almirante | Vicealmirante | Contralmirante | Capitán de navío | Capitán de fragata | Capitán de corbeta | Teniente de navio | Teniente de fragata | Teniente de corbeta |

=== Other ranks ===
The rank insignia of non-commissioned officers and enlisted personnel.

| Rank group | Senior NCOs | | Junior NCOs | Enlisted |
|---|---|---|---|---|
| Dominican Navy |
| Dominican Navy | Sargentos mayores | Sargentos | Cabos | Marineros especialista |

== Dominican Naval Auxiliary Corps ==
The Dominican Naval Auxiliary Corps is a civilian force that possesses its own resources to assist in search operations, rescue and environmental protection. This organization was created by the Executive by Decree 887-09 and it is composed of a group of business and professional volunteers.

The organization operates private boats, barges and aircraft made available to the Navy, in order to assist with non-military activities or public order and safety at sea. The Dominican Naval Auxiliary has a presence in the north, northeast, east, south and center of the country.

== Naval Commandos ==
The Naval Commandos are the Special Operations component of the Dominican Navy and are only employed in emergency situations. The Naval Commandos are capable of undertaking unconventional warfare, hostage rescue, counter-terrorism, VBSS (Visit Board Search and Seizure) and are experts in handling explosives and amphibious operations. They are also trained in parachuting, hand-to-hand combat, CQC and other key skills. The team's armament includes the M16 rifle with the M203 grenade launcher, the Colt M4A1, M14 rifle, Mossberg 500 shotgun, the M60 machine gun and small arms. The team operates inflated zodiac boats, RHIBs, and night vision goggles, among other equipment.

Some team members saw action during Operation Iraqi Freedom. Dominican troops, comprising a battalion of special components of the Dominican Armed forces, were under constant mortar attacks but suffered no casualties. While in Iraq, the troops were serving in the Plus Ultra Brigade, which was under Spanish command and operating in Southern Iraq.

== Marine Infantry Command ==
Raised in 2008 the MIC serves as the youngest arm of service in the Dominican Navy, which is tasked for amphibious and landing operations. One Marine Battalion is of active service as of the present. It is also the youngest Marine unit in all of Latin America.

== See also ==
- Military of the Dominican Republic
