= Dominican schooner Separación Dominicana =

Founding vessel of the Dominican Navy

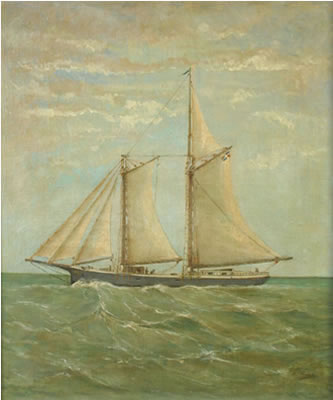
- Schooner "Separación Dominicana" during the Battle of Tortuguero, by Adolfo García Obregón.

History

Dominican Republic
- Name: Separación Dominicana
- Acquired: April 13, 1844
- Commissioned: April 23, 1844
- Fate: Unknown

General characteristics
- Class & type: Schooner
- Tons burthen: 78
- Propulsion: Sail
- Armament: 5 × 4-pounder guns

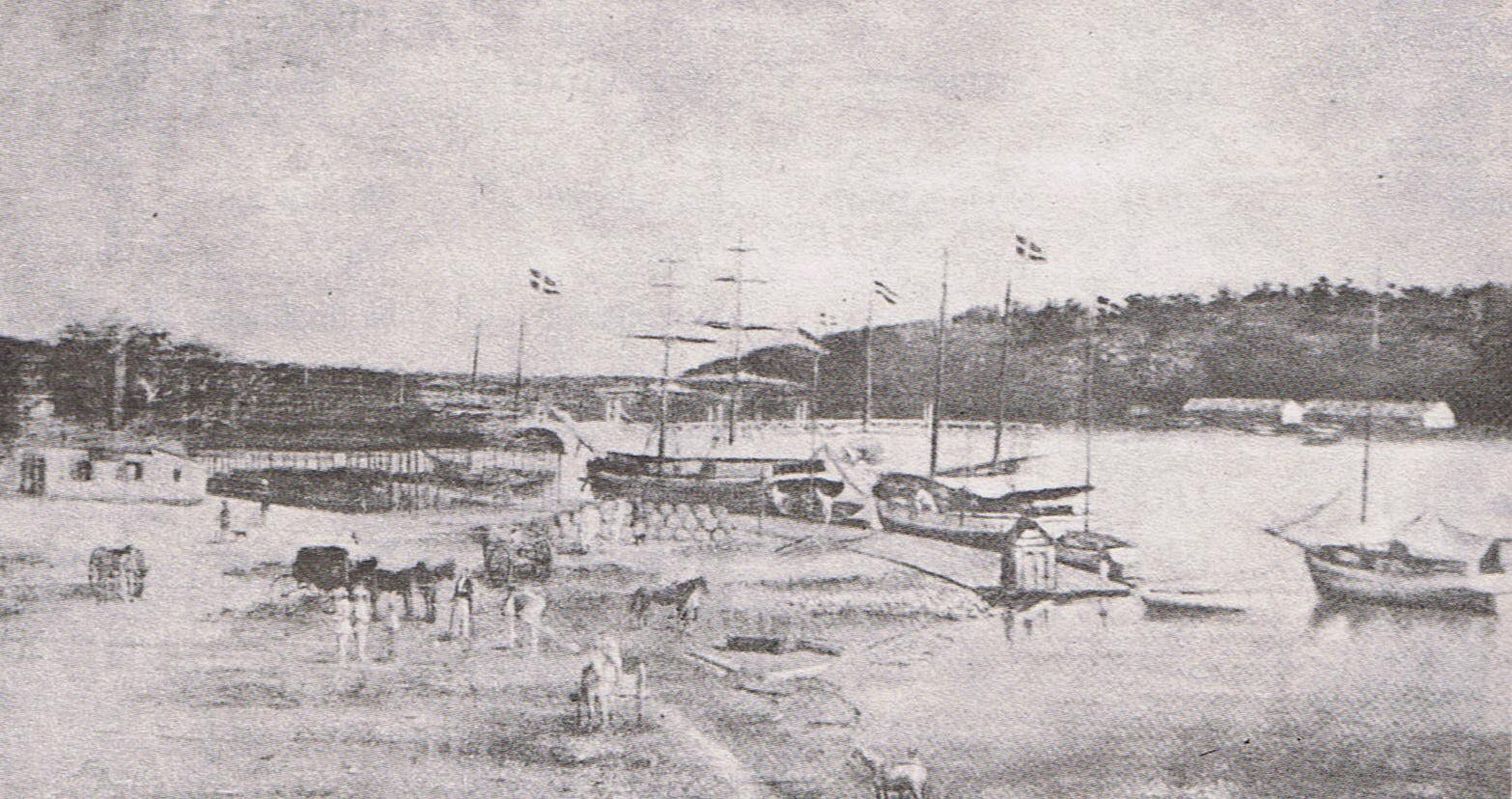
The Separación Dominicana and her two sister schooners in port in Santo Domingo circa 1850

The schooner Separación Dominicana was the first and flagship vessel of the early Dominican Navy, which was formed in 1844. She saw action in the Dominican War of Independence, including the notable Battle of Tortuguero.

== History ==
During the Dominican War of Independence, after the February 1844 Dominican declaration of independence from Haiti, Haiti responded with a blockade of all of the Dominican Republic's ports in early March 1844.

In the Battle of Tortuguero on 15 April 1844, Juan Bautista Cambiaso commanded the five-gun flagship Separación Dominicana and two smaller schooners, decisively defeating a Haitian brigantine and two schooners. As a result of the battle's outcome, Haitian president Charles Rivière-Hérard was ousted from power and Haitian naval operations against the Dominican Republic were suspended.

On April 23, 1844, the Junta Central Gubernativa (Central Government Board) ordered that all three schooners be incorporated into the newly created Dominican Navy, and Commander Cambiaso was named admiral.
