= Andres Rosón =

Dominican priest (1797–1862)

Andrés Rosón
- Andrés Antonio Rosón Mota
- Born: 1797; Santiago de los Caballeros, Dominican Republic
- Died: January 1862 (aged 64–65)
- Occupations: Priest, politician, legislator
- Known for: Father of the Dominican Constitution (1844), parish priest in Baní

Ecclesiastical career
- Church: Roman Catholic
- Title: Parish priest of Nuestra Señora de Regla (Baní)

Andrés Antonio Rosón Mota (1797 – January 1862), known as Andrés Rosón, was a Dominican priest, politician and legislator. He carried out much of his priestly ministry as a parish priest in Baní. In 1844, he was elected deputy to the first Constituent Congress of the Dominican Republic, actively participating in the creation of the Constitution of 1844, making him one of the "Fathers of the Constitution." In 1860, he was nominated as a candidate for metropolitan Archbishop of Santo Domingo, following the death of Archbishop-elect Antonio Cerezano Camarena, who died in Puerto Rico before taking office. His candidacy was supported by both President Pedro Santana and the Consultative Senate, although his appointment was ultimately unsuccessful.

== Biography ==
He was born in Santiago de los Caballeros in 1797, son of Captain Cayetano Rosón and Antonia de Mota Ruiz. His father and one of his brothers died tragically in 1801, during the expedition of Toussaint Louverture to Santo Domingo by Haitian troops commanded by General Moyse Louveture — Toussaint's nephew — in Santiago de los Caballeros.

During the brief period of España Boba, the young Rosón, at the age of 18, entered the Royal and Pontifical University of Saint Thomas Aquinas (Santo Domingo) during its reopening, appearing in the university registers for the years 1815 and 1816. He witnessed the baptism of José María Serra de Castro on December 19, 1819, and of Rosa Duarte on June 28, 1820. After completing his ecclesiastical studies, he was ordained a priest on January 21, 1821, the feast of Our Lady of Altagracia, by Archbishop Pedro Valera y Jiménez, the first Dominican bishop of the Archdiocese of Santo Domingo.

After his priestly ordination, he served as secretary to Pedro Valera y Jiménez until 1830, when the Dominican prelate left for Cuba after being the victim of an assassination attempt. Archbishop Valera expressed his appreciation for Reverend Rosón by including him as an heir to his estate, along with Father Tomás de Portes e Infante.

In 1835 he was appointed parish priest of Santa Bárbara, in the city of Santo Domingo, and later of Nuestra Señora de Regla in the town of Baní, where he served for almost three decades until his death, dedicating almost 30 years to this community.

Following the earthquake of May 7, 1842, which destroyed the church of Baní, he promoted its reconstruction with the support of General Félix Marcano. The new wooden temple was inaugurated in May 1846 (the church was consumed by a fire in 1882) and was later visited by the American agent Lieutenant David Dixon Porter, who was impressed by the parishioners' attendance at mass. The town had 4,650 inhabitants.

He supported the Reform Revolution in 1843 and delivered homilies against the Haitian occupation of Santo Domingo. On February 28, 1844, the priest endorsed Dominican independence in Bani. He participated as a representative of Bani in the Constituent Assembly of San Cristóbal, contributing to the drafting of the first Constitution of the Republic, along with Buenaventura Báez, Manuel María Valencia, Vicente Mancebo and Father Julián de Aponte. He opposed Article 210, which granted extraordinary powers to the president in times of war.

In a speech given on November 24, 1845, he expressed his positive assessment of the Constitution: "Although a more complete and perfect work cannot be described, because such is the character of man's productions, at least it was one that suited our present position... This work has been considered by sensible and religious men as one of the most outstanding benefits with which Divine Providence has favored us ..."

He also provided pastoral care to the hamlet of San José de Ocoa, which he visited on several occasions, especially during the patronal feasts of the Virgin of Altagracia. In December 1846 and January 1847, commissioned by Father Portes e Infante, vicar general of the archdiocese, he visited San José de Ocoa to administer the sacraments and encourage the construction of a temple. In Bani, he also promoted the patronal festivities of Our Lady of the Rule, inviting the most renowned preachers of the time, such as Father Valencia and Deacon Gabriel Moreno del Christo.

On August 10, 1848, he signed a manifesto addressed to the Tribunate reiterating his rejection of Article 210. On January 21, 1855, as commissioner of Tomás de Portes, he blessed and inaugurated the first church in the hamlet of Ocoa, establishing the first hermitage there.

On February 15, 1859, following the death of Archbishop Portes and that of his designated successor, Gaspar Hernández, (who died in Curaçao in 1858), the Dominican chancellery, under the leadership of Miguel Lavastida, presented a shortlist of three candidates for the governance of the Archdiocese of Santo Domingo to the Apostolic Vicar of Curaçao, Martínus Niewindt. The shortlist included Rosón, Fernando Arturo de Meriño, and Miguel Billini Hernández. Father Meriño was ultimately elected.

Between 1859 and 1860, he continued to participate in the religious festivities of La Altagracia in Ocoa, where he also celebrated baptisms during the novena and the patron saint festivities.

On June 28, 1860, Foreign Minister Pedro Ricart y Torres recommended Rosón as ecclesiastical governor in a letter to the elected Archbishop of Santo Domingo, Antonio Cerezano Camarena, who had been ordained a priest alongside Father Rosón in 1821, but died in Puerto Rico on July 11, 1860 before arriving. Later, on August 7, 1860, President Pedro Santana informed Pope Pius IX of the death of Father Cerezano and proposed Father Rosón as a candidate for the archbishopric. The Minister of Foreign Affairs asked the Dominican ambassador to Spain, Felipe Benicio Alfau, to make the proposal to Tomás Iglesias y Barcones, Patriarch of the Indies. In September 1860, the Consultative Senate presented a list of three candidates to the Executive Branch, consisting of Rosón, Antonio Gutiérrez (parish priest of Seybo) and Manuel González Regalado (parish priest of Puerto Plata), although Santana had already suggested Rosón exclusively.

On March 17, 1861, he supported the annexation of Bani to Spain, becoming one of the leading ecclesiastics who supported the process. The annexation interrupted the nomination process and rendered Andrés Rosón's candidacy for archbishopric null and void.

He was godfather and teacher of Máximo Gómez, who would later become general and chief of the mambises during the Cuban War of Independence. Although he had initially been oriented towards ecclesiastical life, Gómez opted for a military career. He was at Rosón's side during his last days, signing his will with him in January 1862.

Father Andrés Rosón died at the end of that month, at the age of 65.
