= Gabriel Moreno del Christo =

Dominican priest and politician (1831–1905)

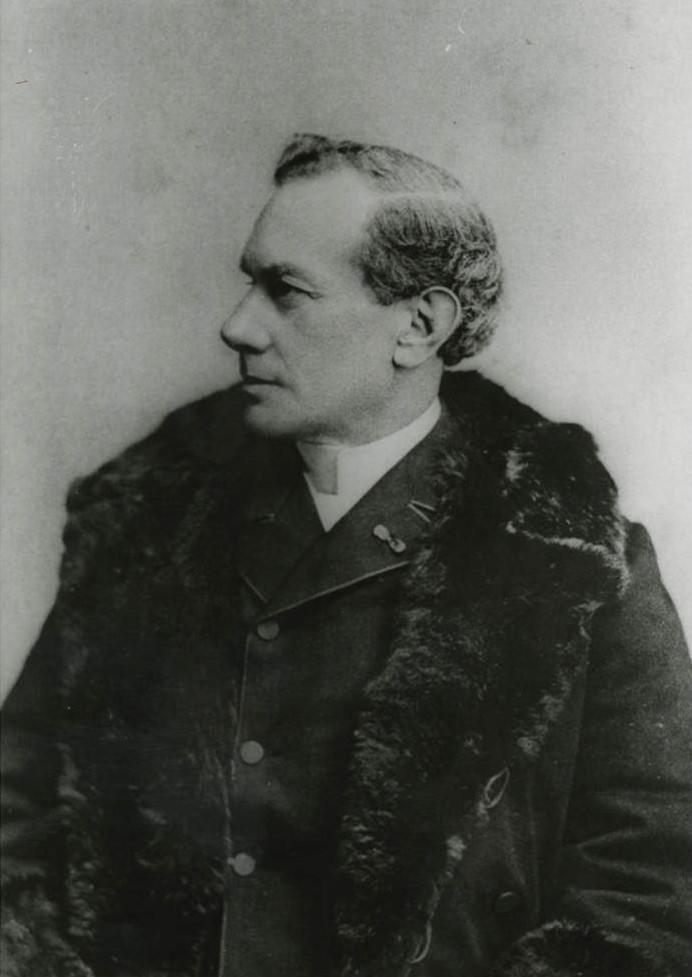
- Born: March 21, 1831; Santo Domingo, Captaincy General of Santo Domingo
- Died: October 26, 1905 (aged 74); Santo Domingo, Dominican Republic
- Education: Saint Tomás Aquinas University
- Occupations: Religious leader and politician

Gabriel Benito Moreno del Christo (March 21, 1831 – October 26, 1905) was a Dominican priest, prelate, politician, diplomat and orator. He was named monsignor and Honorary Chamberlain of His Holiness in 1858 by Pope Pius IX until his revocation in 1861, after the accusation against him of concubinage and paternity of several children in Higüey was proven.

== Biography ==
He was born in the city of Santo Domingo on March 21, 1831. He was the legitimate son of the owner Carlos Moreno de Hoyos (1800– 1881), who was a student at the Royal and Pontifical University of Santo Tomás de Aquino between 1816 and 1817, director of the Santo Domingo City Council in 1820, signatory of the Manifesto of January 16, 1844 and member of the Central Government Board. His mother, Carlota del Christo (1803– 1853), married Carlos Moreno on July 3, 1828.

Moreno was baptized by Father Tomás de Portes e Infante, vicar general of the archdiocese and canon of the Cathedral of the Annunciation of Santo Domingo, on March 29, 1831.

During the First Dominican Republic, Moreno was one of the first intellectuals, thanks to his attendance at the Santo Tomás de Aquino Conciliar Seminary, established in 1848 by Portes. At this institution, he was a student of the priest Elías Rodríguez y Ortiz, the first rector.

While still a subdeacon he wrote in El Eco de Ozama (1852– 1853), combating Protestant propaganda in Puerto Plata. He denounced what he called "antisocial pretensions" and maintained that this preaching was not genuine, but rather hid hidden political ends. After being ordained deacon he spread the gospel with great acceptance in all the churches of Santo Domingo, Baní and El Maniel.

On May 8, 1854, he was ordained a priest in the Cathedral of the Annunciation by the Archbishop of Santo Domingo, Tomás de Portes, with General Pedro Santana, President of the Dominican Republic, as his godfather. Three days later, Santana provided him with the war schooner Cibao to take him to the port of Quiabón, from where he went to the Sanctuary of San Dionisio in the town of Higüey. This parish was his favorite during his 50 years of priestly exercise.

He later showed sympathy for Buenaventura Báez, something common among many clerics of the time, who saw him as a champion and defender of the Church against Santana's religious policy, considered insufficiently committed to their demands. He helped celebrate the second proclamation of Báez as president in October 1856, celebrating a mass where he highlighted the virtues of the leader, comparing him to the Roman Emperor Constantine the Great.

However, this adherence brought him problems during the Cibaeño Revolution, when he was arrested in Higüey, imprisoned in the city of Santiago and later transferred to the San Felipe Fortress in Puerto Plata. Priests such as Manuel María Valencia, parish priest of Santiago, and Jesús Fabián Ayala García, parish priest of San Cristóbal, were also harassed. That year also marked the death of the coadjutor bishop Elías Rodríguez and, the following year, that of Archbishop Portes.

At the age of 27, he embarked on a European journey that began in London, where in August 1858 he had an audience with Cardinal Nicholas Wiseman, Archbishop of Westminster, who provided him with letters of recommendation. During his time as a subdeacon, he fervently studied the restoration movement of the Catholic Church in England, which had been devastated in the 16th century.

In Rome, he impressed the Prefect of the Propaganda Fide, Cardinal Alessandro Barnabò, and won the sympathy of Monsignor Bartolomeo Pacca, chamber master to His Holiness. In October 1858, at an audience with Pope Pius IX, he presented a report on the Church of Santo Domingo, following the advice of Barnabò. His impact was so positive that Barnabò and Pacca warmly congratulated him on the benevolence that Pius IX felt for the "young priest", as he was called in the Apostolic Palace. Shortly afterwards, he was named a monsignor and Chamberlain of Honor to His Holiness. Moreno, now dressed as a monsignor, had an extended audience with the pope, who presented him with a gold and pearl rosary with a malachite cross.

Days after his visit to the Pope, he visited Cardinal Giacomo Antonelli, Secretary of State of the Holy See. At the end of the visit, in St. Peter's Basilica, he recited a Te Deum in gratitude for Santana's triumph in the Cibao, which restored Santo Domingo to its status as capital of the Dominican Republic in September 1858.

His audacity in presenting himself before the Papal Court without a diplomatic post irritated his adversaries at home, many of whom believed that he was seeking to be appointed Archbishop of Santo Domingo. When he submitted the report, he had the recommendation of Martin Joannes Niewindt, Apostolic Vicar of Curaçao, who praised his conduct. Upon returning from Rome, he sent several letters to Cardinal Barnabò requesting faculties to administer the confirmation, without receiving a reply.

In 1859, an anonymous letter to the Cardinal Prefect of Propaganda Fide, together with reports from the Apostolic Vicar of Curaçao, discredited Monsignor Moreno, accusing him of immoralities. This resulted in the denial of his request to administer confirmation.

Despite being an untouchable figure thanks to the support of Santana, who named him Honorary Chaplain to the president on February 1, 1860, he felt slandered in the "most iniquitous way." During that time he gave on February 17 "a concise but eloquent speech" in the Cathedral of Santo Domingo at the funeral of Rafael María Baralt, Dominican consul in Spain, attended by high state officials. He obtained two certificates of good conduct from the priest Fernando Arturo de Meriño, vicar general of the archdiocese of Santo Domingo, in May and July 1860. However, it was discovered that he had had illicit relations with Luisa Caminero Heredia, daughter of the deceased José María Caminero, with whom he had two sons, and with Celimena Villegas, with whom he had a daughter.

Meriño, who had previously supported his actions, was the one who denounced his scandalous conduct. Despite the admonitions, Moreno del Christo persisted in his conduct. Father Meriño 's letter was so forceful that, on June 4, 1861, Cardinal Barnabò informed Father Meriño about the revocation of the cleric Moreno's title of Honorary Chamberlain of His Holiness. Upon receiving the correspondence from the Cardinal Prefect of Propaganda Fide, Meriño commented that Father Moreno accepted the measure.

On the eve of the annexation of Santo Domingo to Spain, the Minister of the Interior and Police, Felipe Dávila Fernández de Castro, asked the priest Moreno to give the speech on behalf of the Church on the day of the annexation. When he refused, Manuel de Jesús Galván, secretary of Santana, visited him at his home. Finally, on March 17, 1861, Santana personally asked him to accept the request, and he agreed. On March 18, he made a speech at the Cathedral Primada de Indias, where he praised President Santana, recalling the history of the island from its discovery by Columbus in 1492 to the oppression suffered under Haitian rule. He highlighted the struggle of the Dominicans for freedom, especially in the fields of Azua and Las Carreras, where Santana distinguished himself as "liberator and father of the country." The monsignor praised the president's action in placing the people under the protection of Queen Isabella II of Spain, ensuring religion, freedom and the Spanish national identity. He concluded with an ovation in the name of the Church, followed by a Te Deum of thanksgiving to God.

In June 1861, he was appointed Chaplain of the Royal Audience of Santo Domingo, reaching his greatest personal glory by giving a notable speech, dedicated to the entry of the Royal Seal in Santo Domingo. During those days, the Spanish authorities entertained him in an event held at the Government Palace. That same year, he traveled to Havana, called by Francisco Serrano, governor of Cuba. On this occasion, Admiral Joaquín Gutiérrez de Rubalcava dedicated a banquet to him at the Maestranza Palace.

On 21 October 1862, Archbishop Bienvenido Monzón appointed him canon of the Primate Cathedral. Thanks to his loyalty to the monarchy he was decorated as Commander of the Order of Isabella the Catholic that same year. In November 1862, he travelled to Madrid as a representative of Santana, who had a scheduled trip that did not take place, and had the opportunity to meet Queen Isabel II and the republican Emilio Castelar, future president of the First Spanish Republic.

After the death of Santana, to whom he administered the anointing of the sick on his deathbed, and the end of the Dominican Restoration War, Báez returned to the country in December 1865. He was received with a Te Deum in his honor, giving a speech full of praise by Moreno. On September 7, 1866, together with other priests, he signed a document submitting to the jurisdiction of Louis Nicolas Joseph de Buggenoms, appointed Extraordinary Envoy of His Holiness and Apostolic Vicar of Santo Domingo. On November 8, 1866, he was named parish priest of Baní. In the church of Moca, that same year, he protected Pedro Antonio Pimentel, saving him from being executed by Juan de Jesús Salcedo.

In 1867, while serving as parish priest in La Vega , he welcomed the President of Haiti, Sylvain Salnave, as a guest during his visit to the country on the occasion of the signing of the treaty of peace, friendship and trade between the two island republics. In 1868, he returned to the care of the parish of the town of Higüey, and in October 1871, he officiated and confirmed the marriage of Cesáreo Guillermo with his partner María de la Cruz Herrera.

In 1874, he was elected deputy for the Province of El Seibo, remaining in his seat until 1875. On January 1, 1875, the apostolic vicar, Brother Roque Cocchia, appointed him honorary canon of the Cathedral Chapter.

In 1878, President Guillermo removed him from his parish in Higüey. He returned to the Congress of the Dominican Republic as a deputy for the Province of Santo Domingo from 1880 to 1881. In November 1885, he congratulated Meriño after his consecration as archbishop of Santo Domingo.

In 1886, President Alejandro Woss y Gil appointed him Envoy Extraordinary of the Dominican Republic to France, entrusting him with congratulating Jules Grévy on his re-election to the presidency of the French Republic. President Grévy decorated him with the Legion of Honor. In Paris, Moreno led a worldly life, moving away from the ideal of his priestly ministry.

On October 26, 1905, he died in his native Santo Domingo, and was buried in the Regina Angelorum Church, the same place where he had celebrated his first mass.

== Legacy ==
In Higüey, a street bears his name.

== See also ==
- Fernando Arturo de Meriño
- Andres Rosón
- Gaspar Hernández
