= Miguel Lavastida =

Dominican politician (1821–1887)

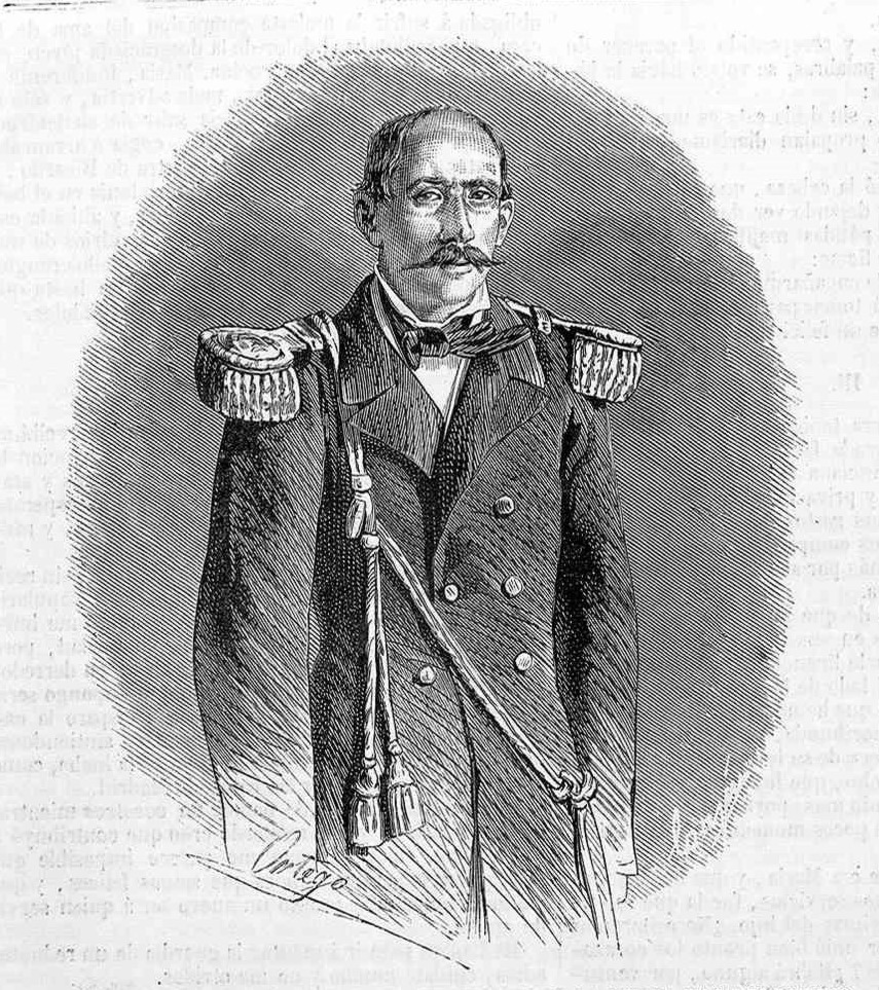

Personal details
- Born: July 4, 1821 Santo Domingo, Colony of Santo Domingo
- Died: November 8, 1886 (aged 65) Matanzas, Cuba
- Spouse: Altagracia Heredia y Sola

Miguel Antonio de Jesús Lavastida Fernández Palomares (July 4, 1821 – November 8, 1887) known professionally as Miguel Lavastida, was a Dominican politician, freemason and military man whose administrative career spanned several decades and multiple roles during the First Dominican Republic.

He held various ministerial positions in the Dominican government, including minister of finance, interior and police, foreign affairs, and war and navy. His influence became particularly noticeable during the presidencies of Manuel de Regla Mota and Pedro Santana. In Santana's last administration, he held the position of minister secretary of state for foreign affairs, where he stood out notably. His diplomatic skills were such that they was compared to those of the Austrian imperial chancellor Klemens von Metternich. For this reason, the priest Gabriel Moreno del Christo nicknamed him "the Metternich of Santana.”

== Early life and family origins ==
He was born on July 4, 1821, in the city of Santo Domingo. His father, Miguel Lavastida y Aguirre (1790–1830), was a captain of infantry militias during the España Boba, standing out as one of those who supported José Núñez de Cáceres in the ephemeral independence and died being a commissioner during the Haitian regime. Miguel Antonio's grandfather, Francisco Lavastida y Valladares, died in Caracas in 1812, while his grandmother, María Manuela Aguirre y López del Pulgar (1753–1839), came from a distinguished family. His paternal grandfather, Juan de Lavastida, a Peninsular public notary, settled on the island in 1753 and married Rosa Antonia Valladares, thus founding the Lavastida lineage in Santo Domingo. Miguel's mother, Francisca Fernández de Palomares, was the daughter of Colonel Esteban Palomares (1749–1801), a military man born in Oran, a Spanish city in North Africa, who rose to the rank of lieutenant colonel of infantry and commanded the Bánica barracks, bravely participating in the War of the Convention on the island. Francisca was married first to Juan de Alcalá, a Venezuelan from Cumaná and relative of Marshal Antonio José de Sucre, who was murdered by a slave.

== Political career ==
In Hato del Llano, when Gabino Puello had concluded his mission of distributing the manifesto of January 16, 1844 to the select personalities of the South and was preparing to retire to Santo Domingo, he was advised by Lavastida to avoid entering Baní so as not to be arrested, since the allies of Buenaventura Báez wanted to arrest him. After independence was declared, he began his public career as National Treasurer. On December 21, 1844, Lavastida married Altagracia Heredia y Sola, daughter of José Vicente Heredia y Campuzano and Faustina Sola y Zárraga, in the Primate Cathedral of America. He was one of the founders of the patriotic association Amigos del País, created by Manuel María Valencia on May 30, 1845, to promote national improvements. Among its first initiatives, the society organized a general subscription to help Dominicans abroad who lacked the means to return to their country. While serving as substitute judge of the Court of Appeals of Santo Domingo, he was appointed Minister Secretary of State for Finance and Commerce by President Báez in September 1851 and temporarily assumed the Ministry of Justice and Public Instruction between December 1851 and April 1852. Despite having had a successful mission in the Cibao region in 1852, he decided to leave office to join the Santanista opposition. On February 9, 1853, he was elected member of the Tribunate for the province of Azua and held his seat for a brief time. Under the second presidency of Pedro Santana, he established himself as a figure close to this leader and a member of his clique, occupying the post of minister of the interior and police on three occasions between 1853 and 1856, and also taking up again the portfolio of Finance and Commerce, where he was in charge of the Department of Development. In 1855, he went on a mission to the nearby island of Cuba, then still a Spanish colony, and managed to get the archbishop of Santiago de Cuba, Saint Antonio Mary Claret, to grant him two priests to serve as chaplains for the Cibao Army. In 1856, during the short presidency of Manuel de Regla Mota, he was in charge of the Interior and Police and Foreign Relations offices, facing the crisis caused by the Spanish consul, Antonio María Segovia, through the Segovia Registration. He was nominated for the presidency and received a single vote in the elections of September 22, 1856. He remained in office until Báez returned to the presidency in October 1856.

== Revolution of 1857 ==
In July 1857, after learning of the uprising in Santiago against the Báez regime, Lavastida and others close to Santana, suspected of being involved in the revolution, sought refuge in the consulates of France and Great Britain. Shortly thereafter, they left for Puerto Rico, arriving in Saint Thomas on August 1, 1857, where General Santana had been in exile since April of that year. He was one of the signatories of the National Manifesto of July 27, 1858, which proposed that Santana take charge of the Dominican State, giving the country its previous course and repealing the Constitution of Moca. Lavastida was part of the commission that took the manifesto to Santana, who accepted the principles of the document and formed a cabinet the next day, naming Lavastida as minister of war and navy, and later also of foreign affairs. In 1859, he suggested to the consul of the Kingdom of Sardinia, Juan Bautista Cambiaso, that the Dominican Republic request the protection of Sardinia. This idea was supported by the French and British consuls of Santo Domingo, who considered it a viable solution to ensure the economic survival and security of the country from Haiti. However, the events of the Second Italian War of Independence prevented the project from moving forward. He was also one of the founders of the Supreme Council of the 33rd Degree of the Dominican Republic on February 16, 1861.

== Services to Spain ==
With the proclamation of the annexation to Spain, the then governor-general, Pedro Santana, appointed him Director General of Government of War and Navy, and then, on June 10, 1861, he changed the title to Secretary of Government of War and Navy, until he was replaced by the peninsular colonel Mariano Cappa. In his role as improvised general, Lavastida traveled to the Cibao to verify that the pronouncements of the annexation were in order, since it was feared that that region was more prone to unrest. During his mission, he was present at the proclamation of the annexation in Guayubín on March 25, 1861, where Generals Fernando Valerio, Gaspar Polanco, José Antonio Hungría, Manuel Jiménez, Lucas de Peña, Santiago Reyes, Bartolo Mejía, and other leaders whom he distrusted were present. On August 8, 1861, he attended the swearing-in ceremony of Santana as lieutenant general, governor and captain general of Santo Domingo, an event in which Francisco Serrano y Domínguez, governor and captain general of Cuba, presided over the swearing-in. Shortly after, on August 12, General Lavastida became part of the Classification Board, whose mission was to classify the officers of the former Dominican Army. In September 1861, Francisco Serrano commented in a letter that, due to the total confidence that Santana had in Lavastida, the latter had amassed a considerable fortune, in contrast to the public misery, and that it was rumoured that he had obtained it by illicit means. For this reason, General Serrano considered it appropriate that Lavastida be transferred to another Spanish territory. In 1862, Lavastida, together with Felipe Dávila Fernández de Castro, traveled to Madrid to present Santana's resignation as captain general of Santo Domingo, with instructions not to open it until arriving in Madrid and to present it without excuses. In addition, he was part of the Economic Board of the province of Santo Domingo. In 1863, Lavastida was awarded the Commandery of the Order of Charles III and was appointed a member of the board of directors of Santo Domingo. In September 1863, he was appointed interim civil governor of the District of Santo Domingo, replacing General Pedro Valverde. He was replaced by Felipe Ginovés Espinal on July 4, 1864. During the Restoration War, the militias of the Dominican reserves refused to consume the biscuits sent from the island of Cuba, destined for the Spanish Army. To supply their needs, provisions were taken from Lavastida's home. By Royal Order of August 8, 1864, the Counselor of Litigation was appointed Rapporteur of the Government Section of the board of directors.

== Final years and death ==
On July 11, 1865, he left his country on the steamer Pizarro due to the abandonment of Santo Domingo by Spain, residing permanently in Cuba. He died on November 9, 1887, at six in the afternoon in Matanzas, as a result of laryngeal cancer. He received the anointing of the sick before dying, and did not leave a will. His funeral was held at the Church of San Carlos Borromeo the following day, being buried in the general cemetery of the city. [ 1 ]

== See also ==
- Pedro Santana
- Antonio María Segovia
