= Pedro Valverde =

Dominican general and politician (1818–1900)

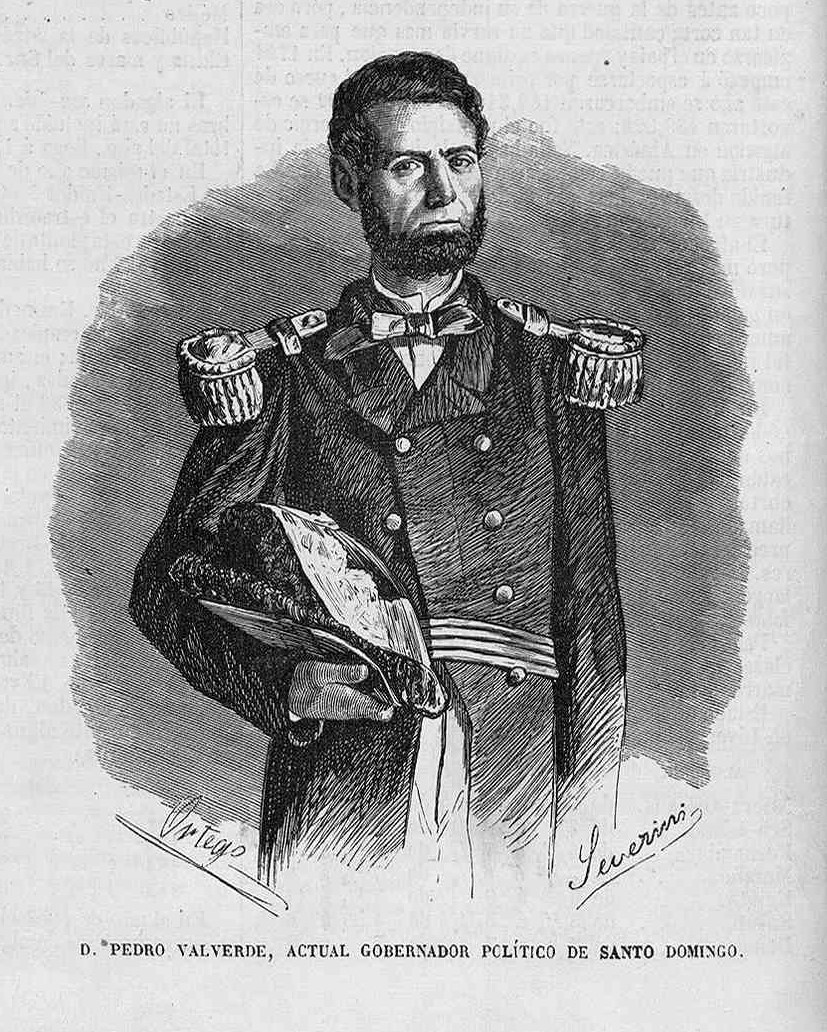
- Born: July 5, 1818; Baní, Colony of Santo Domingo
- Died: March 31, 1900 (aged 81); Santo Domingo, Dominican Republic
- Military career
- Allegiance: Dominican Republic; Spain
- Branch: Dominican Army; Spanish Army
- Service years: 1844–1900
- Rank: General
- Conflicts: Reform Revolution; Dominican War of Independence; Dominican Restoration War; Six Years' War

Pedro Valverde Lara (July 5, 1818 – March 31, 1900) was a Dominican politician and military figure who held various cabinet positions between the 1840s and 1870s. He also participated in ceremonial events, such as the exhumation of the remains of General Pedro Santana in 1879 and the transfer of the remains of General Juan Pablo Duarte in 1884.

== Early years ==
He was born in Baní on July 5, 1818 into a White Criollo family. He was the son of Miguel Valverde and Marcela Lara. He grew up, however, in the capital city of Santo Domingo.

He was part of the Reform Revolution promoted by Charles Rivière-Hérard and opposed the intrigues of the Haitian royalist sector, which attempted to distort the revolutionary movement by sowing discord and unfounded fears, such as the rumor that the reformists sought to enslave blacks. In April 1842, pamphlets were distributed in Baní accusing some Dominican reformers of belonging to a supposed faction in favor of annexing the Santo Domingo to New Granada (present-day Colombia). Valverde, along with his comrade, Pedro Alejandro Pina, who were carrying out pro-reform propaganda work in San Cristóbal and Baní, were forced to flee the latter town to avoid imprisonment under false accusations of being "pro-Colombian," promoted by elements of the Haitian regime of Jean Pierre Boyer.

He joined the Dominican independence movement led by Juan Pablo Duarte. However, during the persecution led by Hérard, Valverde was arrested along with other patriots and imprisoned in the Ozama Fortress in July 1843. Following his release, he rejoined the independence movement. Valverde was present at the Puerta del Conde revolt on the night of February 27, 1844, in which the First Dominican Republic was proclaimed.

== First Republic ==
In 1848, Valverde was part of the entourage that accompanied President Manuel Jimenes on his visit to the Cibao, with the aim of dispelling bad impressions about the political change following the resignation of General Pedro Santana and attracting some loyalists of the previous regime. In January 1852, he was appointed to the Conservative Council, representing the Province of El Seibo, a position he held until December 1854. During his time as a legislator, he participated in the constitutional reforms of February and December 1854. On January 13, 1854, the Santo Domingo City Council appointed him judge in charge of cases related to abuses in the freedom of the press. Additionally, in June 1854, he was commissioned for the general repair of the Palace of the National Congress.

During the Dominican War of Independence, he took part in defending the country in the 1855 campaign of Haitian Emperor Faustin I. Valverde commanded and won the Battle of El Can, near Enriquillo, a decisive victory that expelled the Haitian forces from the region. By the end of the war, he reached the rank of colonel.

In May 1857, he was part of the commission charged by President Buenaventura Báez with implementing an exchange of worthless paper money in the cities of La Vega and Santiago de los Caballeros, a measure that, despite the explanations given to Cibao figures such as Generals José Desiderio Valverde, Benigno Filomeno de Rojas and Domingo Mallol, generated adverse effects. As a result, on July 7, 1857, the inhabitants of Santiago de los Caballeros, disavowed the government of Báez and, under the Valverde's leadership, formed a new government, initiating the Cibaeño Revolution.

Faced with this uprising, Valverde took refuge in one of the foreign consulates in July 1857 and, shortly after, went into exile in Puerto Rico, arriving on the Danish island of Saint Thomas in August 1857, where Santana himself was in hiding. Days later, Valverde returned to the country with Santana, arriving in Puerto Plata. He was one of the signers of the National Manifesto of July 27, 1858, which proposed that Santana assume leadership of the country, repealing the Constitution of Moca and putting in place that of December 1854. Valverde was part of the commission that presented this manifesto to Santana, who accepted its principles.

Later, Valverde was sent as a messenger from Santana to President Valverde to ask him to reconsider his refusal to resign as president of the Republic in the city of Santiago. On December 24, 1858, he joined the sect of Freemasonry.

== War of Restoration ==
In 1861, when the annexation was proclaimed, he was enlisted in the reserves with the rank of general. As a close defender of annexation, he served the Spanish as Governor of Santo Domingo and remained in office even after The Dominican Restoration War was in progress. The Spaniards rewarded the services of Valverde, and in October 1863, he was awarded the medal of Charles III.

However, Valverde was under suspicion of disaffection on the part of the Spanish when he requested a pay raise. Public opinion considered him an instigator of the revolution in the capital and he was seen as disaffected with Spain. He was deposed from his position as governor, replaced by General Miguel Lavastida, Santana's former minister, and imprisoned in the Ozama Fortress. Thanks to Santana's intervention, General Valverde was taken as a political prisoner along with him to the military campaign of Guanuma and Monte Plata, where Santana would face the Restorers.

During his stay at the Guanuma camp, Valverde y Lara took advantage of the discontent brewing within the ranks of the Dominican reserves of the Spanish army, mostly recruited voluntarily in San Cristóbal. Through a silent campaign, he encouraged many Sancristobaleños to desert, which occurred with surprising speed. By the time of the Battle of Arroyo Bermejo, Santana had almost no Dominicans in his ranks. Furthermore, it was rumored that Valverde was responsible for the defection of the Santanista general Eusebio Manzueta, who joined the Restorationist ranks.

In November 1863, Valverde returned to Santo Domingo, where, apparently driven by envy and a desire to regain power, he began a conflict with Lavastida, intending to force his return to the office of governor. In his attempt to discredit Lavastida, Valverde resorted to slander, sowing discord among the inhabitants and fomenting grievances against the Spanish administration. As time progressed, Valverde's attitude and presence became increasingly unbearable for both Lavastida and the governor, Carlos de Vargas. For three months, both endured his provocations, but tension reached a critical point. In an act of compassion, moved by Valverde's story about his father's recent death, Governor Vargas generously granted him 3,000 pesos. However, his conspiratorial behavior did not cease, leading Vargas to take drastic measures. Valverde was arrested and exiled to the castle of Santa Catalina, where he arrived in April 1864.

== Six Years' War ==
Upon his return in 1865, Valverde attempted to approach President Pedro Antonio Pimentel, who received him coldly. Later, along with prominent military officers such as Generals Marcos Evangelista Adón, José María Cabral and Eusebio Manzueta, he promoted an insurrection that culminated in the dismissal of Pimentel and the rise of General Cabral to power under the title of Protector. On August 4 of that same year, Valverde assumed the Secretariat of War and Navy, a position he obtained thanks to the influence of Juan Ramón Fiallo, who promoted a policy of integration of Baecistas and ex-Santanistas in the Cabrales government of the Blue Party. This appointment unleashed a dispute for power between both factions. The inclusion of Valverde in the Ministry of War caused the departure of Manuel Rodríguez Objío from the Cabral's cabinet. He remained in office until being appointed governor of Santo Domingo in October 1865.

In May 1866, Valverde joined the uprising against the third administration of President Báez, forming an alliance with Generals Gregorio Luperón, Pimentel, and Federico de Jesús García, leaders of the Blue Party. Together, these three Blue generals assumed power through a Triumvirate after overthrowing Báez in a coup d'état. In September of that same year, Valverde participated in the presidential elections, where he obtained 14 votes and lost to the Blue candidate Cabral. However, he was elected deputy for the Province of Santo Domingo and served on the National Convention in charge of reforming the Constitution. In addition, he was appointed the first diplomatic representative of the Dominican Republic to Haiti.

On October 7, 1867, an armed invasion from Haiti to the Northwest Line, backed by Haitian President Sylvain Salnave, destabilized the new Cabral government, culminating in its fall in 1868. In the midst of this context, the Minister of Foreign Affairs, Pedro Francisco Bonó, ordered Valverde to return to Santo Domingo and suspended diplomatic relations with Haiti on October 14, 1867. Valverde, firm in his opposition to the policy of the fourth administration of President Báez in the midst of the Six Years' War (1868-1874), faced imprisonment and exile, but never gave up his fight against that regime.

In July 1868, in exile he participated in the Haitian civil war alongside Generals Gregorio Luperón, Marcos Evangelista Adón and Timoteo Ogando in the siege of the Haitian city of Jacmel, which was under attack by government forces of Salnave. These Dominican generals had been welcomed by Haitian military figures Hector and Louis Tanis, lieutenants of Nissage Saget.

In May 1870, with the United States government of President Ulysses S. Grant backing Báez, Cabral sent Valverde to negotiate the United States annexing the Dominican Republic. This plan included the cession of Samaná Bay in exchange for support in overthrowing the Báez government. At the same time, Cabral assured the US representative in Haiti that he would not oppose the Dominican annexation by the United States, as long as the inclusion of his faction in the political process was guaranteed. Unaware of these contradictory maneuvers, Manuel de Jesús Galván presented the proposal to the Spanish Provisional Government headed by Juan Prim, emphasizing the strategic benefits for the Spanish presence in the Caribbean.

== Final years and death ==
In 1875, he received 10 votes in the presidential elections, but failed to win the office. However, he again won a seat in the National Assembly. In 1876, he was a key figure in a new coup d'état. In Santiago, Ignacio María González of the Green Party rose up against the Blue President Ulises Espaillat, challenging his authority in the Cibao. Although the rebellion seemed to be stalled, on October 5, 1876, Valverde, having taken refuge in the French consulate, led a pronouncement in the capital with the complicity of high government officials, forming a Superior Governing Board that assumed power until the return of González. Betrayed and without sufficient support, Espaillat also took refuge in the French consulate on October 5, 1876.

In January 1879, Valverde was present at the exhumation of Pedro Santana. In February 1884, he participated in the transfer of the remains of Juan Pablo Duarte, transferred from Caracas, Venezuela, an initiative promoted by Fernando Arturo de Meriño. On November 20, 1891, Valverde's proposal to change the name of the Plaza del Ex-Convento Dominico to Plaza Duarte was realized. It was also Valverde who suggested the creation of a statue of Duarte (inaugurated in 1930), two years before the Congress of the Republic and the blue president Ulises Heureaux posthumously granted Duarte the title of Father of the Nation.

He died on March 31, 1900. He was 81 years old.
