= Moyse Louveture =

Biography of Moyse L'Ouverture, a figure of the Hatian Revolution (1773–1801)

Moyse Hyacinthe L'Ouverture (also Moïse or Moise; 1773 – 1801) was a Haitian military leader in Saint-Domingue during the Haitian Revolution. Originally allied with Toussaint L'Ouverture, Moyse grew disillusioned with the minimal labor reform and land distribution for black former slaves under the L'Ouverture administration and led a rebellion against Toussaint in 1801. Though executed, the insurrection he directed highlighted the failure of the Haitian Revolution in creating real revolutionary labor change and ignited the movement that drove L’Ouverture from office.

== Early life, family ==
There are conflicting accounts of Moyse's family history. Trinidadian historian C. L. R. James reports Moyse had been stolen from Africa as a child as part of the trans-Atlantic slave trade and was originally part of the Arada nation, a coastal West African kingdom in what is now southern Benin. Others say he was born a Creole slave in 1773 on the Bréda plantation near Haut-du-Cap, on the outskirts of present-day Cap-Haïtien, Haiti. Moyse's ancestry with Toussaint L'Ouverture is contested as well. Some assert that Moyse's mother, Marie-Marthe, also known as Martine, was Toussaint's illegitimate daughter with Cecile, a free person of color, which would make Moyse an illegitimate grandson of Toussaint. All agree that, regardless of biological connection, Toussaint L'Ouverture adopted Moyse as his nephew.

== Haitian Revolution ==
In 1784, Toussaint Louverture (then still Toussaint Bréda) leased the small plantation Moyse, then 11, lived on. All slaves were freed. In 1791, Moyse joined the slave uprising and followed Toussaint in abandoning the Spaniards for the French when the French declared emancipation of blacks in 1794. Moyse was an influential general under Toussaint during the revolution. He was famous for being a close friend of Clairveaux and part of a faction of the revolution most opposed to slavery and most brutal towards white slave owners. Moyse was known for his bravery on the battlefield.

As C. L. R. James described him:

“Moyse was a different type, a 'bonny lad', a dashing soldier, fond of women, the most popular soldier in the army, beloved by the blacks of the North for his ardent championship of them against the whites. He stood high in Toussaint's favour until he refused to carry out Toussaint's severe labour legislation in the North. Cultivation in his district suffered, and Toussaint sent observers to watch his administration and listen to the criticisms Moïse indiscreetly made of Toussaint's policy toward the whites. At first it was thought he would be the successor, and the whites decided that if Moïse ever ruled they would leave.”

Moyse was one of the most ardent leaders of the first uprising in 1791. During the Haitian Revolution, Moyse acted as the second-in-command to Toussaint.

In 1794, Moyse was arrested by Don Lleonart during the feud with Biassart, as a method of intimidation and threat to Toussaint.

During the conflict at Fort-Dauphin in 1798, General Hedouville was sent as a French military agent of Haiti. Following the departure of the English, Hedouville began to crack down on the Haitian rebels, as fear rose in France of the Haitian Army. At Fort Dauphin, Hedouville attempted to dismiss Moyse's regiment, and an agent named Manigat was sent to enforce these orders. Refusing to give up his place, Moyse and his army fought back. However, Moyse eventually fled with part of his regiment. The other part stayed behind to fight and were hurt or killed on the battlefield. Following this confrontation, Toussaint joined two regiments of Africans to these forces, those of Dessources and Cocherel that had been brought to the island by the English before their departure.Moyse then went on to capture Fort Belair with his regiment. His intense resistance to the French, along with Toussaint's military skill led Hedouville to return to France after failing to suppress the Haitian Revolt.

Toussaint wrote of the affair and Moyse in 1798: "Soon I learn that the evil is spreading in all the Communes, that the People are asking their Magistrates for the removal of General Hedouville, the report of the Order which forces him to enlist, the restoration of General Moyse in all his rights, the freedom of the officers of the 5th Regiment, taken prisoner in the affair of Fort-Liberté, and revenge for the assassinations which had been committed there."

In 1801, Napoleon Bonaparte sent French General Leclerec to seize control of Saint-Domingue. Bonaparte singled out Toussaint, Moyse, and Dessalines as revolutionary leaders to be brought back to France, acknowledging how crucial they were to the spirit of the revolution, particularly to the former-slaves and black Haitians not part of the Mulattoe and free black communities who resented the low-class origins of much of Toussaint's army and supported Christophe.

== The Uprising of 1801 ==
Moyse began to register opposition to Louverture in response to Toussaint's singular passing of the 1801 constitution in July, seen as a sign of despotism and cooperation with the French. A dissatisfaction with Toussaint's social and economic conservatism undergirded the revolt. Moyse was the Commandant of the North Province, around Plaisance, Limbé, and Dondon. The workers around him, what C. L. R. James called "the vanguard of the revolution", were not satisfied with Toussaint's labor policies. The work, though better than old slavery, was still in service of the old white slavemasters. Farmers were particularly disturbed by Toussaint's political and economic policies, which signified a return to the plantation system. Under Toussaint's plan to reconstruct the Haitian economy, the plantation was crucial. It is even referenced in Article 17 of the new Constitution, which admits the possibility of importing new arms to secure agricultural production. Furthermore, Toussaint was becoming increasingly more amenable to foreign white presence in Haiti, which signified the subjugation of the Black agricultural class.

Moyse wrote,

“Whatever my old uncle may do, I cannot bring myself to be the executioner of my colour. It is always in the interests of the metropolis that he scolds me; but these interests are those of the whites, and I shall only love them when they have given back the eye that they made me lost in battle."

Moyse and the black laborers organized another insurrection. They planned to massacre the whites, overthrow Toussaint, and place Moyse in power, proving that the black working-class allegiance to Toussaint was only as strong as Toussaint's allegiance to their emancipation. The insurrection occurred on October 21, 1801. Toussaint was away at the wedding of Dessalines when Moyse struck. The revolutionary group was made up primarily of lower-class black farmers, who sought more radical land reform from the revolution. The rebels reportedly shouted phrases such as "Death to whites!" and “General Moyse is on our side!”. The revolution was widespread in the North and numbered at least 6,00 workers. They primarily targeted white property owners, and by the end of the uprising, there were nearly 250 European victims. The total number of victims is placed at around 317. The revolt covered Acul, Limbé, Port Margot, Marmelade, Plaisance, and Dondon. The group attempted to burn and pillage the city of le Cap, but were halted by Henri Christophe, who broke up the first wave of the revolt. The insurrection was crushed by the arrival of Toussaint with brutal Dessalines at his side and the capture of Moyse (James).

== Death ==
Moyse had rallied an impressive resistance to Toussaint, who was terrified his nephew would supplant him. Toussaint refused to let the military tribunal even try Moyse. Instead, he condemned Moyse to immediate execution. Moyse was executed at the Grand Fort not far from Port-de-Paix, after a martial rendered his decision (at the order of Toussaint L'Ouverture), along with thirteen others. Officers Pageot and Martiablès cast judgement on Moyse and demanded he be held responsible during a special counsel on the matter. It has been speculated that L'Ouverture reacted with such harshness in order to prove his decisive leadership to Bonaparte, who he still sought negotiation with.

Upon his death, Moyse uttered: "Je suis sacrifié par Toussaint mais je serai vengé" (I am sacrificed by Toussaint but I will be avenged), before standing before the troops and giving orders to the firing squad: "Fire, my friends, fire."

The results of the 1801 rebellion were somewhat favorable for Toussaint, creating fear among white Europeans which kept them out of Saint Domingue. An anonymous witness to the events observed:

"Quel était le but de ce mouvement. Moise voulait-il s'emparer seulement du principal commandement de la colonie? Voulait-il faire scission avec la France? Quels étaient les instigateurs? N'avait-il pas pris conseil que de lui-même? Toutes questions dont la solution est ensevelie avec lui et avec tous ceux qui l'approchent; ses aides de camp, ses secrétaires qui ont tous été fusillés sans aucune forme de procès. Ou peut être est aujourd'hui le secret du général Toussaint qui n'a pas permis que son procès lui fut régulièrement fait, et a voulu qu'il fut condamné sans être entendu." "What was the purpose of this movement? Did Moise want to seize only the main command of the colony? Did he want to split with France? Who were the instigators? Hadn't he taken advice only from himself? All questions whose solution is buried with him and with all who approach him; his aides-de-camp, his secretaries who were all shot without any form of trial. Or perhaps today is the secret of General Toussaint who did not allow his trial to be held regularly, and wanted him to be condemned without being heard."

On October 25, Toussaint L'Ouverture issued a proclamation addressing the events. About Moyse, he wrote: "Instead of listening to the advice of a father, and obeying the orders of a leader devoted to the well-being of the colony, he wanted only to be ruled by his passions and follow his fatal inclinations: he has met with a wretched end." In the proclamation, Toussaint repudiates those who participated in the rebellion for their immorality. He encourages Haitians to find holiness and morality within their household, as parents, children, and spouses. L'Ouverture ends the letter with a threat: those who spread sedition will either be killed or enslaved for six months. Moyse's death had profound implications. His execution was the final disillusionment of the black working-class against Toussaint. Moyse became a symbol of color and revolution, which lead to Toussaint's fall, capture, and death.

== Ideology ==
Moyse is remembered for representing the pure revolutionary ideals of the Haitian Revolution. He took issue with Toussaint's refusal to break up large estates and wanted small land grants for soldiers and farmers. Moyse also sought to build coalitions and alliances between blacks and Mulattoes against the French. He had a strong attachment towards laborers and powerful hatred of slave-owners but was not anti-white, as he loved Sonthonax, a French general he had worked with.

== Historiography ==
The first and only comprehensive overview of Moyse was written by Haitian historian Madiou 40 years after Moyse's death, though its authenticity has long been questioned.

Little has been written on Moyse. Jacques De Cauna's "Toussaint L'Ouverture et L'Independence de Haiti" gives a detailed account of the conflict at Fort Dauphin and the rebellion, including Moyse, but he has not received individual scholarly attention.

== Research references ==
- "Louverture, Moyse Hyacinthe". Dictionary of Caribbean and Afro–Latin American Biography. Oxford University Press. 2016. ISBN 978-0-19-993579-6.
- Cauna, Jacques de. 2004. Toussaint-Louverture et l'indépendance d'Haïti.
- Donnadieu, Jean-Louis; Girard, Philippe (2013). "Nouveaux documents sur la vie de Toussaint Louverture". Bulletin de la Société d'Histoire de la Guadeloupe (166–167): 117. doi:10.7202/1023735ar.
- Forsdick, Charles; Høgsbjerg, Christian (2017). "The Black Robespierre: 1798–1801". Toussaint Louverture. Pluto Press. pp. 81–103. ISBN 978-0-7453-3515-5. JSTOR j.ctt1pv89b9.10.
- Geggus, David, ed. (2014). The Haitian Revolution: A Documentary History. Hackett Publishing. ISBN 978-1-62466-177-8.
- "(HAITI) Moyse Hyacinthe Letter Concerning the Purchase of Spanish Lands". n.d. Accessed April 26, 2022. https://catalogue.swanngalleries.com/Lots/auction-lot/(HAITI)-Moyse-Hyacinthe-Letter-concerning-the-purchase-of-Sp?saleno=2420&lotNo=352&refNo=717299.
- James, C. L. R. 1963. The Black Jacobins; Toussaint L'Ouverture and the San Domingo Revolution. 2nd ed., rev. Vintage Book; V-242. New York: Vintage Books.
- Beauvoir-Dominique, Rachel (2016). "Louverture, Moyse Hyacinthe". African American Studies Center. doi:10.1093/acref/9780195301731.013.74390. ISBN 978-0-19-530173-1.
- Moïse, Claude. 2003. Dictionnaire historique de la Révolution haïtienne, 1789–1804. Éditions Images.
- Louverture, Toussaint (1798). Rapport fait par Toussaint Louverture, Général en Chef de l'Armée de Saint-Domingue, au Directoire exécutif. Pierre Roux. OCLC 1051754992.
