= Gaspar Hernández (priest) =

Peruvian priest and teacher (1798–1858)

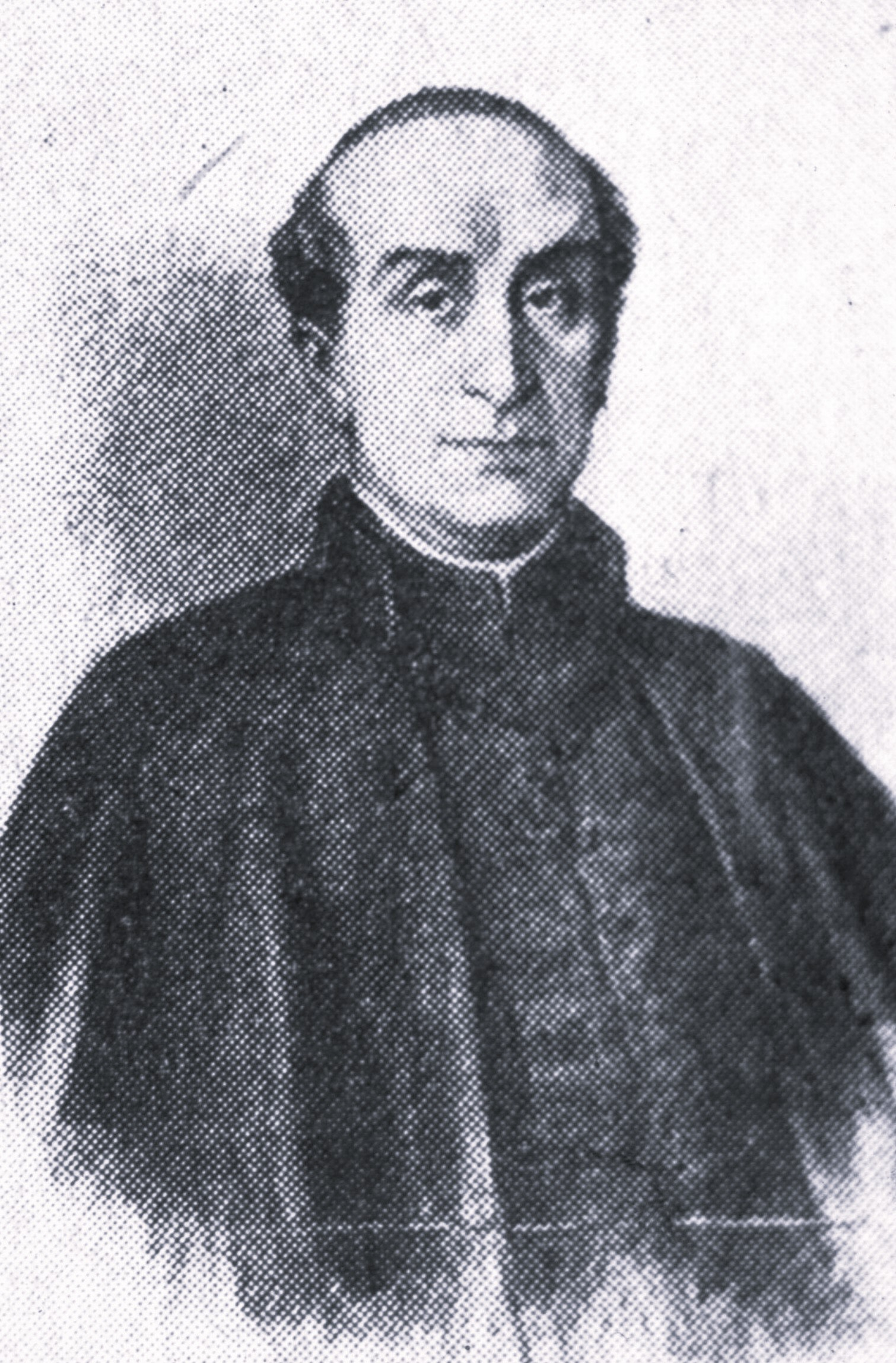
- Illustration of Father Gaspar Hernández

Vicar General of the Archidiocese of Santo Domingo
- In office April 8, 1858 – June 12, 1858
- Preceded by: Tomás de Portes e Infante
- Succeeded by: Calixto María Pina

Personal details
- Born: January 6, 1798 Lima, Viceroyalty of Peru
- Died: July 21, 1858 (aged 60) Willemstad, Curaçao
- Occupation: Priest and independence activist

Gaspar Hernández Morales (January 6, 1798 – July 21, 1858) was a Peruvian priest, religious, professor, politician, prelate, traditionalist and Camillian monarchist. He had a pastoral work in five countries: Peru, Puerto Rico, Dominican Republic, Venezuela and Cuba. In his honor, the municipality of Gaspar Hernández in the Dominican Republic bears his name.

In Saint Domingo, he was the teacher of two of the Founding Fathers of the Dominican Republic, Francisco del Rosario Sánchez and Juan Pablo Duarte, the founder of La Trinitaria. He was prominently involved in favor of the separation of Saint Domingo from Haiti, which led to its expulsion by the Haitian government in 1844. From 1845 to 1848, he served as a parish priest in Venezuela. After returning to Saint Domingo following its independence, he participated as a member of the Conservative Council from 1851 until his expulsion from the country by Pedro Santana in 1853. He performed pastoral work in Santiago de Cuba, where he was a guest of Bishop Anthony Mary Claret and taught philosophy at San Basilio Magno Seminary until 1856. Upon returning to Saint Domingo, he served as vice-rector and briefly rector of Santo Thomas Aquinas Seminary. In 1858, he had a brief period as provisor and Vicar general of the archdiocese of Santo Domingo.

== Early years ==
He was born in Lima on January 6, 1798. He was the son of Francisco Hernández, a native of Galicia (Spain), and Juana Morales, from Lima. At the age of 11, he began his training at the Santo Toribio Seminary College and entered the Order of Saint Camillus at the age of 16. In July 1814, he went to the convent of Nuestra Señora de la Buena Muerte, where he professed his simple vows the following year after the novitiate. After completing his theological studies, he was ordained a priest by the Bishop of La Paz, Antonio Sánchez Matas, on January 11, 1821, and briefly taught as a professor of philosophy at the convent of Nuestra Señora de la Buena Muerte and at the Seminary of Lima.

Shortly after, he was accused of embezzlement and virtually imprisoned in the convent of San Francisco for several months. During the Peruvian War of Independence, he was a royalist and served as a military chaplain for almost four years in the Royal Army of Peru under Viceroy José de la Serna until the defeat at the Battle of Ayacucho on December 9, 1824.

On January 2, 1825, he embarked from Vítor, Arequipa Department. After several voyages, he arrived in Puerto Rico in February 1830. Through the intervention of the Bishop of Puerto Rico, Pedro Gutiérrez de Cos, he took a position as professor of philosophy and mathematics at the newly founded San Ildefonso Seminary in San Juan from 1832 to 1834.

== Priesthood in Santo Domingo ==
After the death of Pedro Gutiérrez, he settled in the city of Santo Domingo, where he began his pastoral work on July 22, 1839, at the Church of San Carlos, outside Santo Domingo. He alternated this position with that of curate of the tabernacle of the Cathedral of Our Lady of the Annunciation (1841–1843). During those years, 1842, he opened a daily philosophy class in a house behind the parish of San Carlos. Among his students were Juan Pablo Duarte, Francisco del Rosario Sánchez, Juan Isidro Pérez and Pedro Alejandro Pina. When he was transferred to the cathedral, the "school" moved to a room attached to the sacristy of the Regina Angelorum Church, where he met with the young people every morning. These daily meetings, more than philosophy classes, seemed like a "revolutionary junta." At that time, the lack of educational institutions in Santo Domingo due to the Haitian regime made the priest one of the few leading educators on the entire island.

On April 30, 1843, he delivered a homily at the Te Deum in the Chapel of Mercy for the recent success of the Reform Revolution of March 24. In the presence of Canon Tomás de Portes e Infante, Vicar General of the Archdiocese of Santo Domingo, General Pablo Alí, Commandant of Arms of Santo Domingo, and members of the Popular Committee of Santo Domingo, Hernández sensitized his audience about the past oppression under Jean-Pierre Boyer and predicted a promising future for Haitians and Dominicans. However, with the coming to power of Haitian President Charles Rivière-Hérard, the strongman who displaced Boyer, Hernández was forced to leave the island for Curaçao in August 1843, along with the Navarrese Franciscan Friar Pedro Pamiés (1809–1843), accused of stirring up the people with his sermons.

Hernández and Pedro Pamiés championed a vision in which Spain was seen as the protector of the Dominican clergy and religious tradition in the face of repression and disdain for the Catholic faith by successive Haitian leaders who favored English Methodist Protestant missionaries. This religious persecution is considered one of the root causes of the Dominican quest for independence.

From the island of Curaçao, Father Hernández contacted the governor of Puerto Rico on August 22, advocating for the return of Santo Domingo to Spanish sovereignty. He expressed his loyalty to Spain, declaring, "I am Spanish anywhere." In a March 1844 letter to a friend, Father Hernández said, "I congratulate you and all Dominicans for having thrown off the yoke of domination by the Cocolo muñeses, harboring the hope that since you have never been ungrateful to your mother country, you will soon acclaim it."

He moved to Venezuela, working as a parish priest in Altagracia de Orituco and, from 1845, as interim parish priest and vicar of La Guaira until March 1848. He returned to Santo Domingo and served as interim parish priest of the city of La Vega from October 1848. He supported Major General Pedro Santana in the Pronouncement of La Vega on May 21, 1849, against Dominican President Manuel Jimenes. In 1851, he was elected deputy for the province of Santiago and became vice president and president of the Conservative Council, promoting public education. In October 1852, he was appointed professor of mathematics, surveying, and cosmography at the Colegio Nacional San Buenaventura. At the same time, he was parish priest of Santa Bárbara and Azua. On March 6, 1852, the Archbishop of Santo Domingo, Tomás de Portes e Infante, appointed him honorary canon of the Chapter of the Cathedral of the Annunciation, but he was suspended a divinis for irregular conduct.

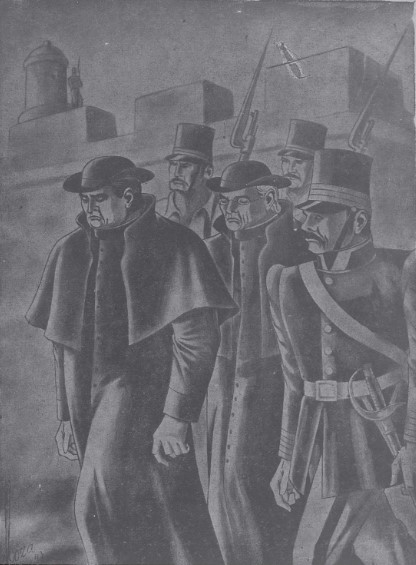
After a period of tension with Santana's administration, Hernández was eventually banished from the country.

When Santana was elected president of the Dominican Republic for the second time, he issued a decree expelling Father Hernández from the country again in March 1853, along with priests Elías Rodríguez and José Santiago Díaz de Peña. Exiled in Curaçao, he published a work entitled Derecho y prerogativa del Papa y de la Iglesia (Right and Prerogative of the Pope and the Church), a brief challenge to the four articles of the Assembly of the Gallican Clergy of 1682. In this text, the priest clearly sets out his monarchical views and his skepticism towards the republican governments of Latin America, stating that they "promise much and deliver nothing; on the contrary, they destroy freedoms and social rights. These defects are notorious."

From Curaçao, he moved to the city of Santiago de Cuba, and for three years he was a guest of the Catalan archbishop Antonio María Claret, working in that Cathedral and some parishes of the archdiocese, teaching philosophy at the Colegio Seminario San Basilio Magno (1854–1856), and occupying his position as honorary canon in that Chapter, despite being so de jure only in the Cathedral of Santo Domingo.

Coming from Santiago de Cuba and after a brief stopover in Havana, the steamer Habanero arrived in Santo Domingo on January 24, 1857. Protected by the decree of the Council of Secretaries of State, signed by Dominican President Manuel de Regla Mota on August 11, 1856, the traveler was able to return thanks to the annulment of the expulsion order and the authorization for the return of exiles from the government of Pedro Santana. This stay, his third and last in Santo Domingo, would last just 17 months. During this period, the cleric assumed the role of vice-rector of the Santo Tomás de Aquino Conciliar Seminary (1857–1858), participated in the consecration of Coadjutor Bishop Elías Rodríguez in 1857 and presided over his funeral. Upon the death of Archbishop Portes, he took over the government of the archdiocese and became rector of the Santo Tomás de Aquino Seminary on April 8, 1858. These events occurred in the midst of a civil war in which Santana was besieging Santo Domingo. Faced with Santana 's imminent entry into the city following the capitulation of President Buenaventura Báez, he decided to leave before the surrender.

== Death ==
He arrived in Curaçao on 12 June 1858 and stayed with the Apostolic Vicar of Curaçao, Martin Joannes Niewindt. However, he soon fell ill and despite medical care, his health did not hold up. He died on July 21, 1858, aged 60, and was buried in St. Anne's Parish in Willemstad.

== See also ==
- Juan Pablo Duarte
- Francisco del Rosario Sánchez
