= El Maniel =

Maroon community in Hispaniola

El Maniel (also known as Le Maniel) is the name given to high places (mountains) by escaped enslaved people in Hispaniola that sat close to the vaguely defined borders of Santo Domingo and Saint-Domingue (now modern-day Dominican Republic and Haiti). People who lived in the area and their communities were also referred to as manieles. The escaped enslaved people chose to live in the high sierras because of their inaccessibility and their location near the border between the French-owned and Spanish-owned parts of Hispaniola. When colonial authorities tried to attack the Maniel, the maroons would move across the borders, nullifying the authority of the country to execute them.

The city of San José de Ocoa was founded by these formerly enslaved people.

Near Neyba in the southwestern part of the Dominican Republic, there was a place called El Maniel. In 1784 the place was described in a letter to the Spanish king by Dominican archbishop Isodoro Rodríguez as having been formed over a century before.
