= Tomás de Portes e Infante =

Dominican Catholic priest (1777–1858)

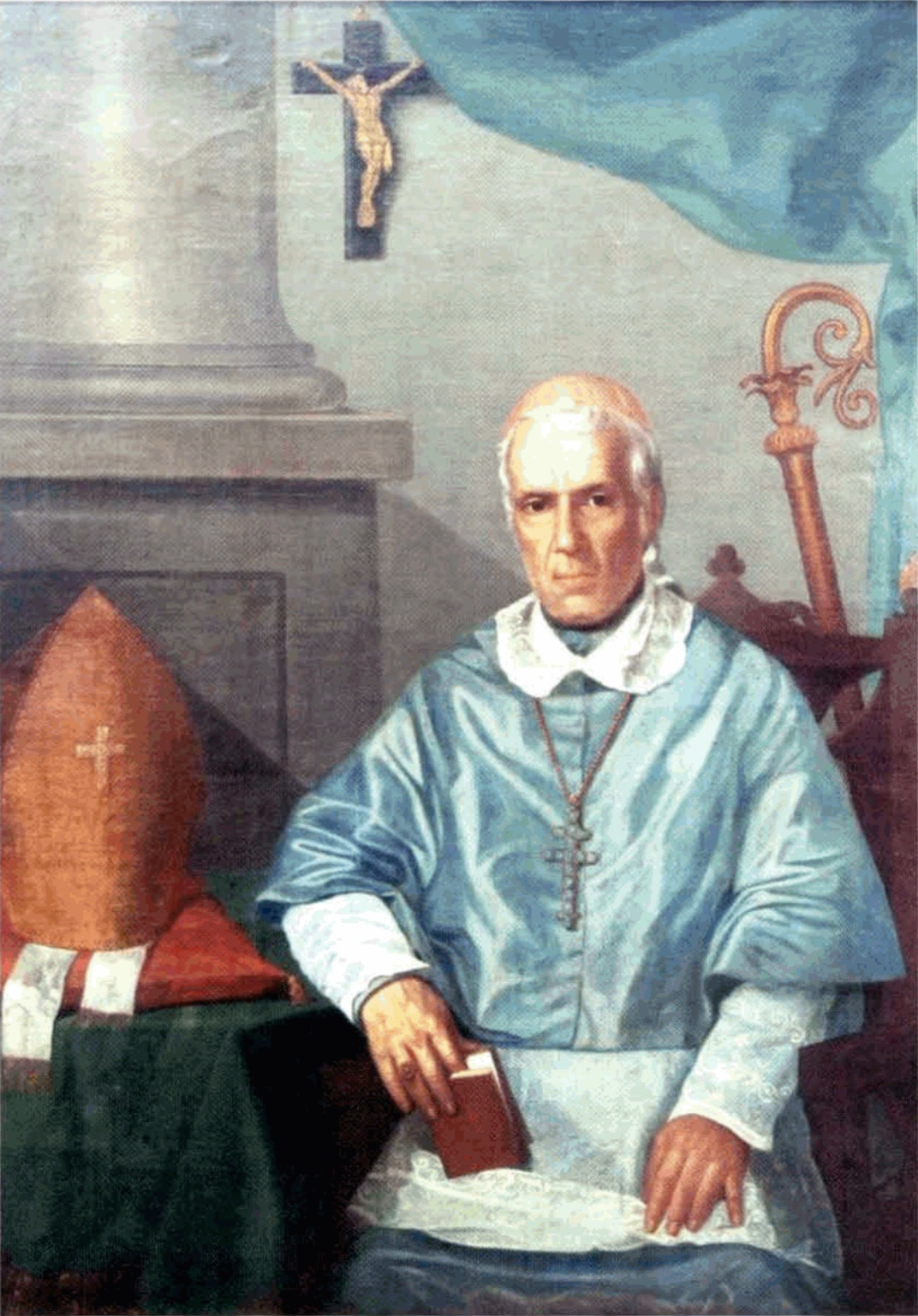
- Illustration of Tomás de Portes e Infante

42nd Archbishop of Santo Domingo
- In office January 20, 1848 – April 7, 1858
- Preceded by: Himself
- Succeeded by: Gaspar Hernández

Vicar General of the Archidiocese of Santo Domingo
- In office July 28, 1830 – January 20, 1848
- Preceded by: Pedro Valera y Jiménez
- Succeeded by: Himself

Personal details
- Born: December 11, 1777 Santiago de los Caballeros, Captaincy General of Santo Domingo
- Died: April 7, 1858 (aged 80) Santo Domingo, Dominican Republic
- Occupation: Priest and independence activist

Tomás de Portes e Infante (December 11, 1777 – April 7, 1858) was a Dominican priest and bishop who served as the 42nd Archbishop of Santo Domingo, Primate of the Indies – after having been Vicar General of the archdiocese since 1830 – from 1848 until his death in 1858. With a total of 27 years at the helm of the archdiocese, including his time as vicar general, he was one of the most prominent prelates of the Catholic Church in the Dominican Republic.

He was the second archbishop and the fourth bishop to be Dominican in the history of the Catholic Church. In addition, he was one of the first Dominicans to have a daguerreotype made and was noted for his defense of the rights of the Catholic Church in the Dominican Republic.

== Biography ==
He was born on December 11, 1777, in the city of Santiago. He was the son of Juan Portes and María Infante Morell de Santa Cruz, both natives of Santiago. He studied at the school of Licentiate Andrés Muñoz Caballero and received his first tonsure and minor orders in his hometown. Later, he moved to the city of Santo Domingo to continue his studies at the Royal and Pontifical University of Santo Tomás de Aquino.

At the age of 17, due to the invasions of the island of Hispaniola, he emigrated to Puerto Rico and later to Venezuela to study Civil Law. In 1802, he was ordained a priest in Cuba, exercising his ministry in the Church of Our Lady of Sorrows and in the Church of San Salvador in Bayamo. In 1809, he returned to Santo Domingo after the restoration of Spanish sovereignty, serving as interim rector of the parish of Santa Barbara.

Santo Domingo, after declaring its independence from the Spanish monarchy in December 1821, was quickly annexed by neighboring Haiti. At the time, Haiti was in a state of schism with the Catholic Church since its independence. The majority of the clergy, including the Metropolitan Archbishop of Santo Domingo, Primate of the Indies, and Pedro Valera y Jiménez, were supporters of King Ferdinand VII of Spain. On July 28, 1830, Valera left the island after being the victim of an assassination attempt, leaving Portes as Vicar General of the archdiocese, recognized five years later by the Holy See as Apostolic Delegate. That same year, Ferdinand VII claimed the Spanish part of Santo Domingo from Haiti.

During his time as vicar, he maintained a cordial and harmonious relationship with the Haitian state, avoiding conflicts and even presiding over the commemorations of Haiti's independence in 1835 in Santo Domingo, carrying the Blessed Sacrament in procession and singing a Te Deum. Historian Emilio Rodríguez Demorizi suggests that this attitude may have been motivated by prudence, as the Church preferred to avoid a situation similar to the 1801 invasion of Toussaint Louverture.

In 1833, Valera died in exile in Cuba, and Ferdinand VII died, which meant the end of Spanish claims in America and the beginning of the First Carlist War. From then on, with the establishment of the Liberal State in the Kingdom of Spain, Portes oscillated between the protectorate with the Kingdom of France as preferable to the return to Spain. From 1840, he maintained contact with André Nicolas Levasseur, Consul General of France in Port-au-Prince, because King Louis Philippe I of France favored the return to the Church of the goods confiscated by the French Revolution, while the regent of Spain, Baldomero Espartero, adopted an anticlerical policy.

In 1844, he initially disagreed with the proclamation of Dominican independence, but later supported it and endorsed the French protectorate project. He was appointed Archbishop of Santo Domingo by the Central Government Board, and during the rebellion led by General Juan Pablo Duarte in the Cibao, he threatened to excommunicate those who disobeyed the Board and its president, General Pedro Santana.

Although he took the oath and participated in the celebrations for the Constitution of San Cristóbal, he subsequently strongly opposed it. He stood out for defending the rights of the Church against state power, especially in relation to the articles that abolished ecclesiastical property, chaplaincies, and fuero privileges. Despite his efforts to have these articles removed, Santana, then President of the Dominican Republic, refused, leading Portes to report the violation of his rights to the Prefect of Propaganda Fide, Cardinal Felipe Fransoni. In March 1845, Felipe Fransoni responded to Portes, supporting his position and stating that: "...the rights of the Church should not be impaired, although he hopes that this will not happen, given the great faith and religion of the Dominican people." Later, in March 1846, Portes attempted to request constitutional reform from the Tribunate, but his request was overwhelmingly rejected.

On January 20, 1848, thanks to Santana's efforts, Pope Pius IX appointed him archbishop, although he downgraded the archdiocese to a non-metropolitan one. On March 27 of that year, he wrote to the Congress of the Dominican Republic requesting the creation of a College-Seminary. This initiative culminated in the founding of the Santo Tomás de Aquino Conciliar Seminary on May 8, 1848. This seminary was the only educational institution that existed in the country at that time, until the creation of the Colegio de San Buenaventura in 1852.

On November 12, 1848, he was consecrated bishop at Our Lady of the Annunciation Cathedral by Monsignor Martinus Joannes Niewindt, Apostolic Vicar of the Diocese of Willemstad. During his ten years as bishop, Portes was notable for increasing the number of parishes, carrying out pastoral visits in the Eastern Region, and ordaining eleven new priests. He also undertook the task of restoring the Confraternity of Our Lady of Sorrows, which had ceased its activities since the time of the Era of France.

During the Haitian invasion of 1849, the French consul, Victor Place, influenced the Congress of the Republic to call on former President Santana to repel the invasion. Santana and his men, upon arriving in the capital, encountered obstacles due to the climate of fear that had developed in the city. Both Place and Archbishop Portes had difficulty allaying this fear, but eventually managed to overcome the obstacles, and Santana led a successful defense.

In May 1851, Portes held the fifth diocesan synod of Santo Domingo and, in the same year, became one of the first Dominicans to have a daguerreotype made along with Santana and the President of the Republic, Buenaventura Báez.

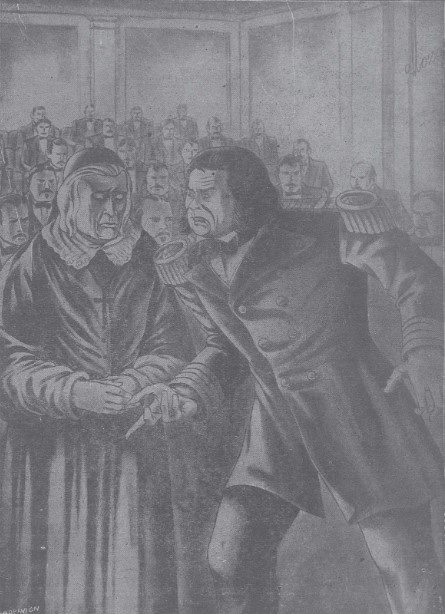
Dispute between Portes and General Pedro Santana

In March 1853, a verbal confrontation broke out between Portes and Santana in Congress. Santana urged Portes to swear allegiance to the Constitution, an act which Portes initially refused. He announced his intention to leave the country, but later retracted his intention and sent the priest Antonio Gutiérrez, a recognized supporter of Santana, to swear allegiance to the Constitution on his behalf in the Cathedral. This episode reflects the tension between the political power and the Church during that period of Dominican history.

Portes was instrumental in uniting the Dominican Church in celebrating the dogma of the Immaculate Conception in 1855, which was declared by Pius IX in the bull Ineffabilis Deus. Faced with his failing forces, he succeeded in getting the Holy See to appoint a coadjutor archbishop in 1857, who died five months after his consecration. Portes wrote to appoint the Peruvian Gaspar Hernández to head the archdiocese after his death.

On April 7, 1858, Portes died in Santo Domingo, in the midst of the Cibaeño Revolution. He was 80 years old.

== See also ==
- Gaspar Hernández
- Pedro Santana
