= Conservative Council =

Dominican upper chamber during 1844–1854

Conservative Council Consejo Conservador

Type
- Type: Upper House of the Congress of the Dominican Republic

History
- Founded: 1844
- Disbanded: 1854

Meeting place
- Santo Domingo, Dominican Republic

Conservative Council was the name of the Dominican upper chamber between November 1844 and February 1854.

The Dominican Constitution of 1844 foresaw the existence of two chambers in the national congress: the Conservative Council and the Tribune, upper and lower chambers which in other Dominican constitutions of the nineteenth and twentieth centuries received the name of Senate and Chamber of Deputies or Representatives; With that it was intended to conform a system according to the model of the United States Congress, which would correspond to the Conservative Council a similar function to the Senate in the United States.

The designation of the president of the Conservative Council corresponded to the same chamber, of a triad voted by the members. The sessions of the Conservative Council were held the current Borgellá Palace in the Plaza Colon of the Colonial City of Santo Domingo, in front of the first town hall in the Palace Hall.

The Constitution of 1844 was amended twice in the year 1854, one in February and one in December. During the amendments made in February 1854 the Tribunate changed its name to the House of Representatives and the Conservative Council to the Senate. With the amendments of December 1854 Dominican Republic accepts to the unicameral system, establishing only a Consultative Senate. With the entry into force of the Constitution of Moca of 1858 became in Dominican Republic to the bicameral legislature.

== Composition ==
The appointment of the councilors was by indirect census suffrage at the rate of 1 for each of the 5 provinces that formed the newly created nation on two levels (Santo Domingo, Santiago or Cibao, Azua, La Vega and El Seibo). Counselors would last 6 years and could be re-elected indefinitely.

The conditions necessary to be a member of the Conservative Council were:

*Being in the enjoyment of Civil and Political Rights.

- Be at least thirty years old.
- Owning Real Estate.
- Have your address in the Province that chooses it.

Naturalized aliens could be members of this body fifteen years after their naturalization.

— Political Constitution of the Dominican Republic, Article 62, 1844

== Attributions ==
Article 67 of the Constitution of San Cristóbal established the exclusive powers of the Conservative Council. These attributions were:

*Sanction all Laws in general with the following formula: On behalf of the Dominican Republic execute the Law N...

- To suspend the Sanction of the Laws agreed by the tribunate and to make the observations that it judges opportune.
- To propose to the Tribunate draft laws on those matters in which it did not have initiative exclusively.
- To put in a state of accusation to its members.
- To decree the accusation of the President of the Republic and of the Secretaries of State by virtue of the denunciation made by the Tribunate in case of finding it founded.
- Judge the Judges of the Supreme Court of Justice in the cases provided by the constitution.
- Elect the judges of the Supreme Court and other lower courts, among the candidates proposed by the Tribunate.
- Decide the issues that may arise between the Commons and the powers of the State.

— Political Constitution of the Dominican Republic, Article 67, 1844

In case of death, resignation or dismissal of a member of the Conservative Council, the Tribunate proceeded to its replacement electing a citizen who met all the qualities required to be Conservative. The new member only held the position for the time remaining to serve his term to the replaced member. The members of this body received a compensation of three hundred pesos during each session. In 1847 the President of this body, Mr. Juan Nepomuceno Tejera defended the position of Tomas Bobadilla y Briones Tribune when he demanded from outside the right to rejoin his legislative functions.
