= Manuel María Valencia =

Dominican writer and revolutionary (1810–1870)

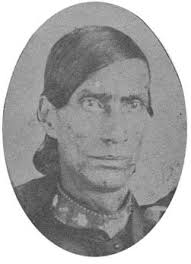
- Born: April 22, 1810; Dominican Republic
- Died: 1870 (aged 60); Cuba
- Occupations: Writer, politician,

Manuel María Valencia (April 22, 1810 – 1870) was a Dominican Republic lawyer, politician, writer and religious man. He was a deputy for Santo Domingo during the Haitian occupation.

Once the Dominican Republic was established, he accepted public positions. He was president of the first Constituent Congress in San Cristóbal and of the commissioners who drafted the Constitution of San Cristóbal promulgated on November 6, 1844.

== Biography ==
He was born in Santo Domingo on April 22, 1810, son of Esteban Valencia Bruno (1771–1842), and Maria de Belen Lopez Isidoro. His grandparents were, on his father's side, Francisco Javier Valencia and Clara de Jesus Bruno Rincon, and on his mother's side Pedro Matias Lopez and Maria de los Dolores Isidoro. In 1832, he married Maria Antonia Billini and Mota (1814–1848) daughter of the Piedmontese Juan Antonio Billini and Ruse (ca. 1787–1852) and his first wife Juana de Mota and Arvelo. His daughter Juana Valencia Billini, was the mother of Narcisa Ureña Valencia, who was the wife of the Dominican president Ramon Cáceres. Valencia llegó a ser director del Liceo Nacional de Santo Domingo. Valencia became director of the National Lyceum of Santo Domingo.

He presided over the Constituent Congress that drafted the Constitution of San Cristóbal, the first constitution of the Dominican Republic; he was then elected as the first President of the Supreme Court of Justice but resigned from the post after two weeks, being replaced by Domingo de la Rocha Angulo. On April 15, 1846, he succeeded Tomás Bobadilla in the Ministry of Justice and Public Instruction.

In 1848 he translated the French codes: civil code, penal code, civil procedure, and criminal instruction. In that same year he was widowed and was ordained by a priest in Curaçao, being appointed parish priest of the Sanctuary of Higüey. The following year he was elected tribune (senator) for the province of El Seibo. In March 1850, he was appointed parish priest of La Vega, and then transferred 36 months later to Monte Cristi.

Valencia had just been appointed parish priest of Santiago when the Cibaeño Revolution broke out, in which he was harassed for his friendship with President Buenaventura Báez, which is why he went into exile in Cuba in August 1859, where he would occupy several parishes in the center and east of the island. In 1869, in the midst of the Ten Years' War, he abandoned his parish in Jiguaní and decided to join the Cuban independentists. He died in 1870.

== Literary work ==
Among the works in Valencia we can highlight:

- The truth and nothing else (1843)
- Tribute to reason (1845)
- A Night in the Temple (1874)
- On the death of my father (1874)
- The Eve of Suicide (1874)

== See also ==
- Buenaventura Báez
- Tomás Bobadilla
- Dominican Republic literature
