= Antonio Galvao =

António Galvão or Antonio Galvao may refer to:

- António Galvão (c. 1490–1557), Portuguese soldier, administrator, and historican.
- Frei Galvão (1739–1822), Brazilian friar
- Dino (1901–1993), Brazilian football player

== See also ==
- Anthony (given name)
- Galvao (surname)
