= Galvani (surname) =

Galvani is an Italian surname derived from the given name Galvano, from Latin Galbinus and Galba. Notable people with the name include:

- Alberto Galvani (died 1586), Italian architect-engineer
- Alison P. Galvani (born c. 1977), American epidemiologist
- Ciro Galvani (1867–1956), Italian actor
- Dino Galvani (1890–1960), Italian-British actor
- Graziella Galvani (1931–2022), Italian actress
- Lucia Galeazzi Galvani (1743–1788), Italian scientist
- Luigi Galvani (1737–1798), Italian biologist
- Paolo Galvani (born 1964), Italian journalist and businessman
- Pelagio Galvani (c. 1165–1230), Portuguese cardinal
- Romano Galvani (born 1966), Italian footballer
- Stefano Galvani (born 1977), Italian tennis player
- William H. Galvani (1861–1947), Russian-American civil engineer, vegetarianism activist and writer

== See also ==
- Galvão (Portuguese)
- Galván (Spanish)
