= Galvani (disambiguation) =

Luigi Galvani (1737–1798) was an Italian physician and physicist from Bologna.

Galvani may also refer to:

== People ==
- Galvani (surname), people with the surname Galvani

== Science ==
- Galvani potential, an electric potential difference
- Galvani Bioelectronics, a British bioelectronics company
- Luigi Galvani Medal, an award given by the Italian Chemical Society

== Other uses ==
- 10184 Galvani, a main-belt asteroid
- Piazza Galvani, a square in Bologna
- Galvani (crater), a lunar crater that lies close to the northwestern limb of the moon
- Galvani, the first electric railway locomotive, built in 1841 by Robert Davidson
- Italian ship Luigi Galvani, several ships
