= Galvanus =

Galvanus may refer to:

== People ==
- Galvanus de Bettino (c. 1335–c. 1394), also called Galvanus de Bononia, Galvanus Becchini, Italian religious scholar
- Galvanus de Levanto (fl. 14th century), also called Galvanus Januensis, Galvanus of Genoa, and Galvano de Gines), Italian theologian, physician to Pope Benedict XII
- Luigi Galvani (1737–1798), Italian physician and physicist

== Other ==
- Galvanus, an alternate name for Gawain
- Lamp of Galvanus, sometimes called lamp of Galvanus Martianus, an artifact mentioned in the 1658 work Hydriotaphia, Urn Burial by Thomas Browne
- Silentium Galvanus, a bogus homeopathic medicine named in an internet meme; see Galvão Bueno#Cala a boca Galvão (Internet meme)

== See also ==
- Galvano (disambiguation)
- Galgano (disambiguation)
