= Galvan =

Galvan and Galván are surnames. Notable people with these surname include:

- Adriana Galván, American psychologist
- Anna Galvan (born 1978), New Zealand netball player
- Aubrey Galvan (born 2006), American basketball player
- Carlos Galván (born 1973), Argentine footballer
- David Galván (born 1973), Mexican long-distance runner
- Diego Galván (born 1982), Argentine footballer
- Elias Gabriel Galvan (born 1938), Mexican-American Methodist bishop
- Guillermo Galván Galván (born 1943), Mexican general
- Israel Galván (born 1973), Spanish dancer and choreographer
- Javier Galván (born 1966), Mexican politician
- Jesús Galván Carrillo (born 1974), Spanish footballer
- Jorge Galván (born 1966), Mexican writer and engineer
- José Galván (born 1981), Argentine footballer
- Juan Galván, Spanish explorer
- Luis Galván (1948–2025), Argentine footballer
- Martín Galván (born 1993), Mexican footballer
- Matteo Galvan (born 1988), Italian sprinter
- Miguel Galván (1957–2008), Mexican comedian and actor
- Nicasio Galván (born 1973), Spanish politician
- Pedro Galván (politician) (died 1892), Mexican general and politician
- Pedro Joaquín Galván (born 1985), Argentine footballer
- Rubén Galván (1952–2018), Argentine footballer
- Victoria Galvan (born 1986), Mexican-American singer

== See also ==
- Galvão (Portuguese) and Galvano and Galvani (Italian)
- Galvan, a fictional alien race introduced in the second series of the Ben 10 franchise
- Galván, Dominican Republic, a town in Baoruco Province, Dominican Republic
- Galvan (fashion brand), a British fashion label
