= José Joaquín Puello =

Dominican revolutionary and politician (1805–1847)

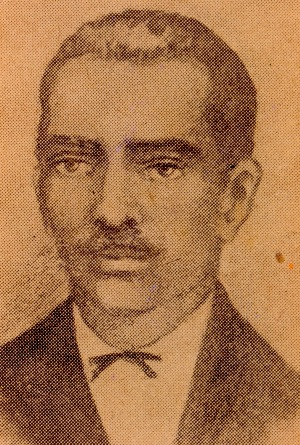
- Portrait of General José Joaquín Puello, c. 1845
- Born: 1805; Santo Domingo, Santo Domingo
- Died: 23 December 1847 (aged 42); Santo Domingo, Dominican Republic
- Cause of death: Execution by firing squad
- Relatives: Eusebio Puello (brother); Gabino Puello (brother)
- Military career
- Allegiance: Dominican Republic
- Branch: (Haiti) Haitian Army: 31st and 32nd Regiment; Dominican Army: Liberation Army
- Service years: 1834–1847
- Rank: General
- Conflicts: Dominican War of Independence

José Joaquín Puello de Castro (1805 – 23 December 1847) was a Dominican revolutionary and government minister who stood out as a key leader in the Dominican War of Independence.

His participation in the proclamation of Independence on 27 February 1844, marks him as the officer who managed the black battalion that was camped on the left bank of the Ozama River on the eve of the assault on the Puerta del Conde, deciding its adhesion to the movement. Detached on the southern border, he stopped the advance of the Haitian troops in the Battle of Estrelleta, on 17 September 1845. Since then he served Pedro Santana as Minister of the Interior and Police for two years, and later as Minister of Finance.

Politicians who accused Juan Pablo Duarte of being a traitor to the country and exiled him, hatched the plot against Puello, instigated by the French consul, Eustache Juchereau de Saint Denys, inventing a conspiracy headed by him. Santana, upon learning of the accusation, decided to punish him, making him a prisoner in Santana's home. By article 210 of the Constitution of 1844, he was brought to trial in December 1847, in which he was sentenced to death along with other relatives. Puello was executed on 23 December 1847.

== Background ==
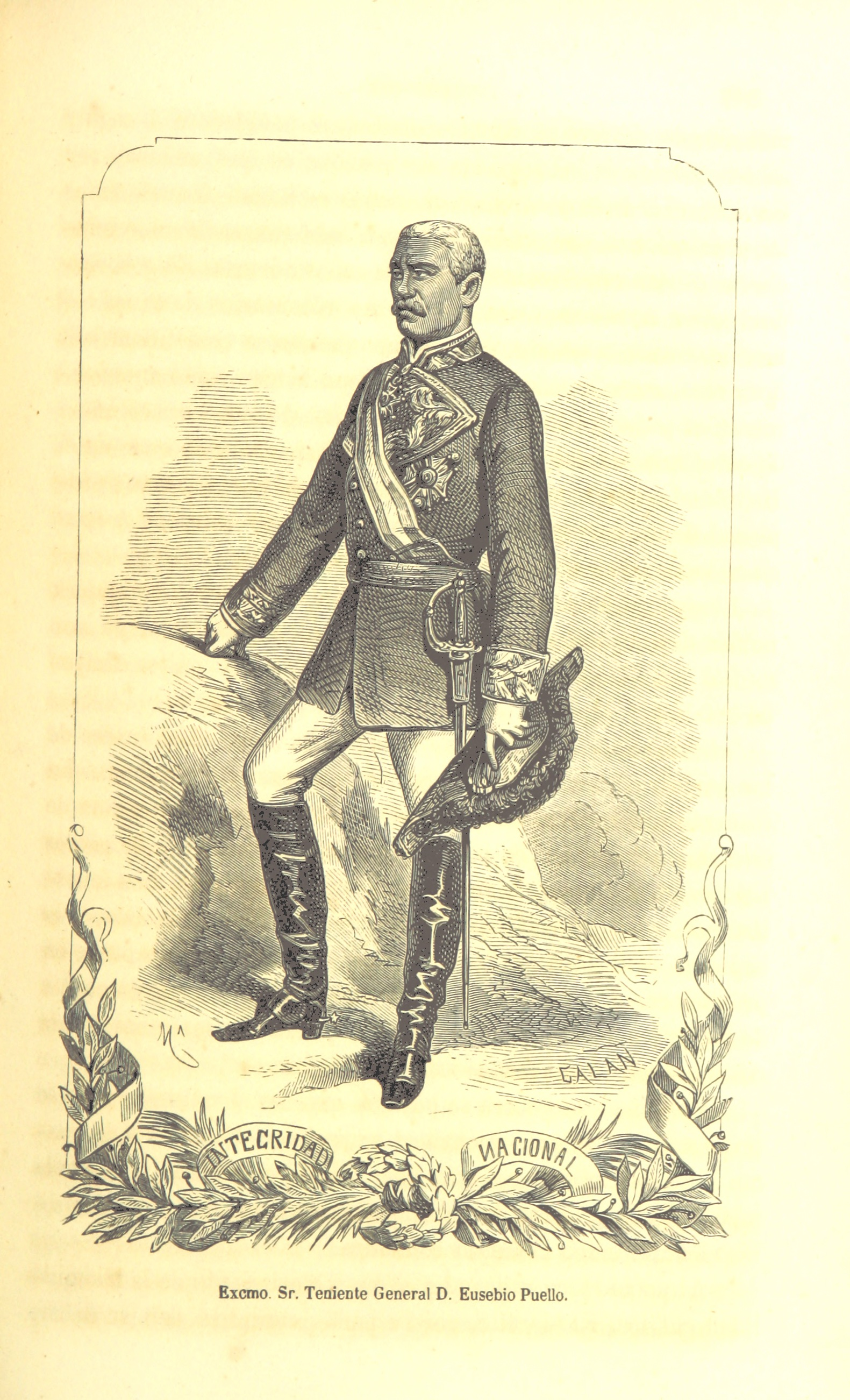
Portrait of Eusebio Puello, José's younger brother, born in 1811.

He was born in the capital city of Santo Domingo, during the French regime in eastern Hispaniola. He was the eldest of six children to Martin Joaquín Puello de Castro (1782–1864) and Maria Merced de Castro, both free blacks from Santo Domingo. The family origins of José Joaquín Puello and his brothers Gabino and Eusebio, who also reached the rank of general, have not been completely clarified, despite the efforts of Víctor Garrido Puello, a descendant of Eusebio. From the information obtained by historian Roberto Cassá, it is deduced that they came from the modest means typical of the late colonial period. The social structure of Santo Domingo provided these sectors with a space for development, although subject to respect for the superiority of the group of landowners and officials. It is not clear whether the Puello ancestors achieved a marked social rise, but it is possible that this was the case, since the prominence of the three brothers is significant, despite their identification with the town. There is not much information about the social status of Martín Puello's father, but the fact that he lived inside the walled city is an indicator that he was in the middle class. It is known that Gabino, after leaving the army, worked as a musician.

There are different dates for Joaquín Puello's birth, but it is likely that it occurred in 1805. The second of the brothers, Gabino, was almost certainly born in Puerto Rico, which suggests that, like thousands of Dominicans, his parents went abroad. Like so many others, they returned as soon as conditions permitted, which is seen in the fact that Eusebio was born in Santo Domingo in 1811.(Other historians claimed that he may have been born in 1808).

It has already been seen that Joaquín held leadership positions in the Haitian troops, which put him in a position to perform functions in the military establishment of the Dominican State. Gabino also enjoyed influence, and participated in the preparations for the coup of 27 February 1844, although he did not achieve the authority plans of his older brother. Eusebio, perhaps because he was the youngest, was initially quite overshadowed, but after the period of disgrace that followed the execution of his brothers, he associated himself with other sectors, accepted the conservative precepts and reached the rank of field marshal of Spain after the Dominican Restoration War. For a long time, Joaquín associated the presence of Haitian rule with the fate of black and mixed race people, which is why he maintained his support until mid-1843. When Charles Rivière-Herard overthrew the dictator Jean Pierre Boyer, he expelled the Puello brothers from the troop because he considered them supporters of Boyer. This accident helped Joaquín to lean towards the advance of positions favorable to the break from Haiti, a trend stimulated by the crisis that shook the leading circles of that country.

== Independence leader ==
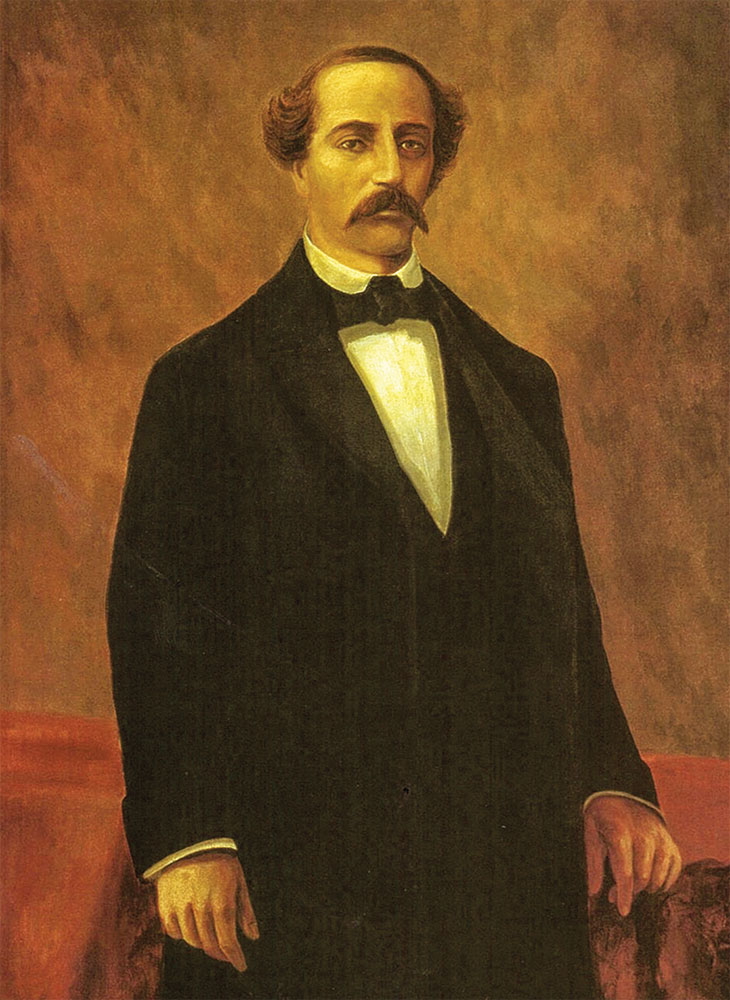
As Puello grew disillusioned of the Haitian occupation, his activism drew the attention of the revolutionary leader, Juan Pablo Duarte, whose ideals of racial equality and fraternity resignated well with that of Puello.

After the fall of Boyer, in March 1843, among Dominicans the criterion began to gain ground that the conditions for independence or another form of rupture with Haitian rule had been created. The conservatives, many of whom had collaborated with the Haitians in public administration, began to orient themselves towards the search for a protectorate of France, the power that then had the greatest interests in Haiti. In the Constituent Assembly of Port-au-Prince, led by Buenaventura Báez, they reached a secret agreement with the consul general of France, André Nicolás de Levasseur. According to that agreement, the Dominican State would be placed under the protectorate of France for 10 extendable years, would cede the Samaná Peninsula in perpetuity and would collaborate with the return of Haiti to French rule. Although the negotiations were carried out discreetly, it was clear to the urban media that the conservatives, who disbelieved in the viability of an independent order, placed expectations on the protection of France, for which they commonly received the label "French-minded." These opposed by all means the objective of the Trinitarios to establish an autonomous order, considering that it was the product of the naivety of inexperienced young people. Over time, both parties came to the conclusion that it was impossible for either of them to expel the Haitians on their own, so a current of understanding emerged among the Triniatrios with the conservatives.

Puello, now disillusioned with the Haitian regime, joined the struggles for independence when he learned of the democratic position of the Trinitarios. Conveniently, It so happened that Gabino Puello was a neighbor of Juan Pablo Duarte, who hid in his house when he was subjected to persecution by Hérard. The Puellos' involvement in the movement occurred through José Diez, Duarte's uncle, who approached Gabino, who in turn introduced him to José. These recruitments contributed to the Trinitarios expanding their influence over portions of the mass of the people in the capital city. Puello was guaranteed that the Trinitarios would not repeat the example left by the "Colombians," as Haitian officials propagated. This was an allusion to the Independent State of Spanish Haiti proclaimed by José Núñez de Cáceres on 1 December 1821, conceived to be part of Gran Colombia, discredited for not having abolished slavery.

From the beginning since their recruitment, Puello and his brothers distinguished themselves as irreplaceable pieces. It can be asserted that Joaquín was responsible for obtaining the commitment of many members of the 31st and 32nd regiments, composed of Dominicans from the city of Santo Domingo, without whom the overthrow of Haitian rule would not have been possible. Within these conspiratorial activities, the ability shown to incorporate people from popular sectors who until then had been disconnected from the preachings of the Triniatrios stood out. While they began to finalize the preparations, Puello operated alongside Francisco del Rosario Sánchez as a military specialist and in charge of the operational details necessary to carry out the coup against Haitian rule. In the weeks prior to the proclamation of independence, a revolutionary center led by Sánchez was established, with the presence of Puello, Manuel Jiménes, Vicente Celestino Duarte and Matías Ramón Mella. The revolutionary center of the Trinitarios obtained concessions from the conservative lawyer Tomás Bobadilla on political aspects that they considered non-negotiable. This is seen in the terms of the Manifesto of January 16, 1844, which called for the establishment of a sovereign State that would not question the conquests achieved during the Haitian occupation, such as the abolition of slavery. It seems that during the course of the negotiations, differences arose, which explains why Vicente Celestino Duarte decided not to sign the document. But, fundamentally, the Trinitarios considered that their national and liberal positions were recognized within the political and ideological parameters of the projected State.

It was on that basis that Puello, as a conspicuous figure representing humble and colored people, accepted the alliance with the conservatives. In the days preceding the proclamation of the Dominican Republic, Puello had the mission of guaranteeing the practical feasibility of the movement. Sánchez was hidden, so he could only draw up guidelines that others had to execute. The only one who stands out with a prominence similar to that of Puello was Jiménes, who also enjoyed a certain influence over the troops and over people whose cooperation turned out to be fundamental. Puello's activism extended to the rest of his family, who had personal ties to Sánchez. Gabino excelled in these tasks, who received the mission of taking the copy of the 16 January Manifesto to the southern region, in order to obtain cooperation so that the coup could be supported. That area was of vital importance, since the Haitian army would have to enter it in any reaction aimed at crushing the nascent Dominican State. The main problem that Gabino had to solve was to neutralize the influence of Buenaventura Báez in Azua, the most important town in the region. Báez tried by all means to prevent the Trinitarios from being successful, even denouncing Gabino's activities, which caused which caused him to be persecuted by the Haitians.

Among the final agreements made by the plotters, it was decided that Sánchez would preside over the Central Government Board, the provisional government of the projected Dominican Republic, and remain head of the Department of Santo Domingo. In the same order, it was agreed that Puello would be appointed head of the city garrison, with the rank of colonel, the most important military position within the outline of the organization of the independent authority.

== Post-Independence ==
=== Member of the Central Government Board ===
During the night of 27 February 1844, Puello showed a firmness of character consistent with the responsibility he had under his charge. He deployed the device to occupy the strategic points of the city, especially the port and the bastions of the walls. This guaranteed communication with the opposite bank of the river, crucial to allow the arrival of reinforcements from Los Llanos and El Seibo, on which expectations were placed to ensure the capitulation of the reduced Haitian garrison. A problem that Puello had to solve was the resistance of the African Battalion, made up of former slaves from Monte Grande, led by Commander Esteban Pou, whose troops feared that the independent State would reestablish slavery. That battalion prevented movement between Santo Domingo and the east, so Puello ordered that Pou be informed that "if he does not enter at the moment with his battalion, I will make him enter with two pieces of artillery." The order was led by his brother Eusebio, who managed to get the former slaves to abandon their rebellion and place themselves under the orders of the Republic. When the battalion leaders, Commander Pou and Captain Santiago Basora, made their presentation in the city with many of their men, Puello explained to them that the Dominican Republic guaranteed their freedom, as a pledge of which he put his personal origin.

During the first months of independent life, Puello's actions were discreet, understanding that, as a soldier, it was not his place to interfere in political affairs. He limited himself to reinforcing the city's defensive capacity and trying to support the activities of the Southern Front, commanded by Santana. Despite this reserved attitude, he was a supporter of the radical democratic approaches of Juan Pablo Duarte, which gained him greater popularity. To consolidate the positions favorable to absolute independence, Puello selected his troops among blacks and mulattoes, who could not help but view the behavior of the conservatives with hostility. The importance of Puello as a key figure who supported Duarte's positions is observed in a manifesto signed by members of the troops of the capital city, which requested that Duarte, Sánchez and Mella be promoted to the rank of division generals, and that Puello was conferred the rank of brigadier general. The Central Government Board rejected the first request, but had to accept Puello's promotion.

=== Dissolution of the Board ===
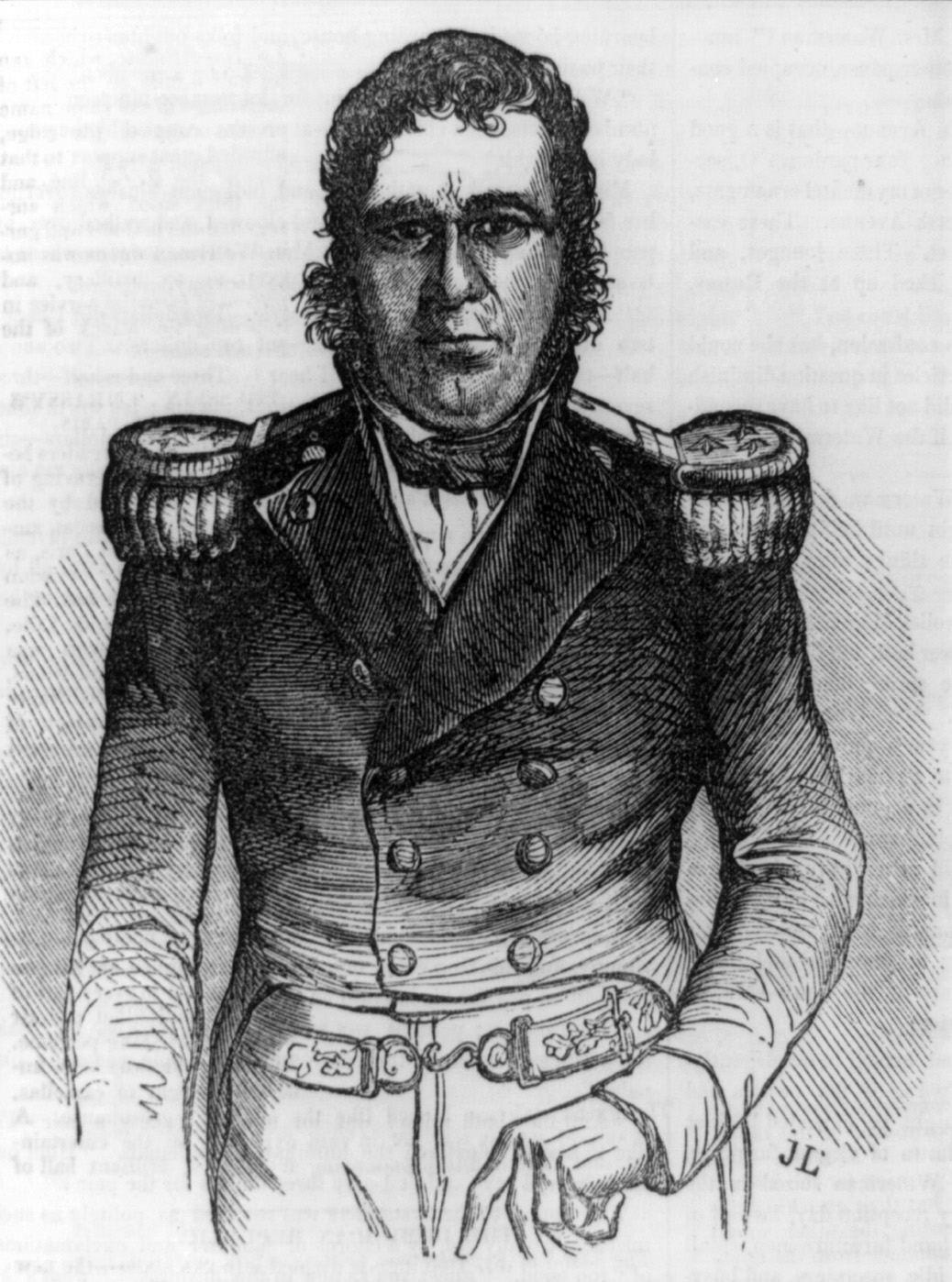
As the citizens of Santo Domingo were proclaiming Juan Pablo Duarte as the president of the new nation, Pedro Santana launched a counter-coup against the Board.

At the end of May, conflicts between Trinitarian liberals and French conservatives precipitated, when the latter openly attempted to impose the Levasseur Plan, which stipulated the French protectorate. Tomás Bobadilla, in his capacity as president of the Board, gave a speech before the authorities and prestigious figures of the capital, which tried to make the protectionist concept official. Duarte immediately raised his voice reproaching these unpatriotic proposals, a prelude to a chain of conflicts that culminated on 9 June with the deposition of the conservative majority of the Junta due to a popular movement whose main instigator was Puello.That day the Central Government Board was reorganized. Francisco del Rosario Sánchez was placed in his presidency and Juan Isidro Pérez and Pedro Alejandro Pina, faithful companions of Duarte, were incorporated. The latter was sent to Cibao, in order to obtain support for the new government. Meanwhile, Pedro Santana, leader of the largest troop, remained on standby and the country was on the brink of civil war. In the confrontation with the conservatives, Puello showed belligerent positions, in defense of Duarte's ideas. He surrounded himself with a "praetorian guard" made up of members of the African Battalion. The French consul Eustache Juchereau de Saint-Denys disliked him, considering that his intransigence was the basic obstacle to the adoption of the Levasseur Plan. The Consul helped spread the idea that Puello was a dictator whose purpose was to eliminate the influence of the whites.

The correlation of forces in favor of the Trinitarios began to fade when Santana refused to hand over command to Colonel José Esteban Roca, appointed by the Board to prepare the ground for Sánchez, designated head of the Southern Front. Confusion spread in Santo Domingo when there was news that Duarte had been proclaimed president of the Republic in Santiago. There were differences between Duarte and Sánchez, since the latter was in favor of reaching some form of agreement with the conservatives. Now, what put things in a critical state was the belligerence of Santana, proclaimed supreme leader of the country on 3 July by the officers of the Southern Front. Days later, the Seibano hatero marched towards San Cristóbal with the purpose of entering Santo Domingo in an apparent conciliatory plan. Apparently, Sánchez, despite his moderate position, tried to oppose the entry of Santana and the prevailing opinion against the civil war. But Santana's skill achieved the desired effect: by announcing that he was not coming in the spirit of war, he calmed the spirits of many who thought of a friendly understanding. The two figures who had the greatest impact on this position were Manuel Jiménes, head of the province of Santo Domingo, and Puello himself, military chief of the city, the two military commanders that the Trinitarios had counted on from the independence revolt. Particularly decisive in the outcome of the conflict was the fact that Puello, who held the strings of military control of the city, decided not to offer armed resistance to Santana.

There is no testimony about the reasons that led Puello to this decision, but it is not safe to assume that he obeyed the conviction that the civil war would be fatal and would open the way to the return of Haitian rule. It is possible that he received guarantees that the return of the conservatives to the leadership of the Board would not entail ignorance of the social and political regulations favorable to the majority sectors of color.

On 21 July, Santana entered the city at the head of the troop, well received by Jiménes and Puello. He acted with caution, in order to avoid bloodshed, and the next day he was proclaimed supreme head of the country, after which he reorganized the Central Government Board, awarding himself its presidency. In the first reform of the Board, Sánchez was appointed as a member, but when Santana realized that there would be no serious opposition to the counter-coup, he decided to expel the Trinitarios who had shown belligerent attitudes.

While Sánchez, Juan Isidro Pérez and Pedro Alejandrino Pina, among others, were imprisoned, Manuel Jiménes and Joaquín Puello were confirmed in their positions. In a matter of hours there must have been a separation between those who decided to accept Santana's preponderance and those who were not willing to bow to it. Santana decided to operate tactfully in such circumstances, aware that he lacked much strength and, therefore, it was in his best interest to attract the greatest number of supporters. It was crucial for him, to establish his authority, to neutralize the bulk of the people who had supported Duarte's positions. In this way, the arrest and subsequent deportation of Duarte and his most conspicuous companions had as a counterpart the integration into the new government of the greatest possible number of former Trinitarios who, like Puello, had distinguished themselves for their radical positions but decided to depose them for the sake of the unity of the country.

The fact that Puello turned his back on Duarte and was the architect of Santana's victory without bloodshed does not mean that he abandoned the essence of his political positions. For tactical reasons, the dictator decided not to make his annexationist position known, and shortly after becoming president it was learned that the French government had decided to disassociate itself from the maneuvers deployed by its consul in Haiti, preferring for the moment not to interfere in the internal affairs of the Dominican Republic. In the following years no power showed interest in annexing the Dominican Republic or placing it under its protection. In such a context, there was no conflict between Santana and Puello. The former was interested in keeping the latter at his service as a means of leaving the impression that he represented all sectors. It was also convenient for Santana to keep Puello as a means of weakening other conservatives who did not accept his dictatorial prerogatives. Santana had not achieved absolute authority, so he was forced to maneuver between people and factions.

=== Clashes with the conservatives ===
As part of this scheme, the secret confrontation between Puello, an intransigent defender of absolute independence, and a clique of conservatives, led by the main ministers, some of whom did not hide their annexationist faith, was evident. Although it was no longer discussed explicitly in that sense, for many of them Puello was still the representative of black people. They raised a question of "race" that did not exist, since they were the only ones who advocated an exclusivist policy, according to which dominance should be reserved for whites. Puello questioned this orientation in ethnic-social matters, thereby ratifying the substance of the convictions that had led him to accept independence, to show solidarity with Duarte and, finally, to join the Santana regime as a lesser evil in those circumstances. Puello continued to be an idol among the poor people of color, and for him absolute independence was identified with the interests of that social sector. But he did not aspire to the elimination of whites, but rather to guarantee equal rights among all Dominicans, regardless of skin color, surname or religious beliefs, as had been stated by Duarte.

This position was intolerable to the recalcitrant conservatives, who saw in him a dangerous enemy, capable of displacing them from power, as he had demonstrated on 9 June 1844. They were concerned that he continued to maintain a strong share of command as head of the garrison of the capital and, later, as Minister of the Interior and Police. A personal component was added: Puello felt he had enough authority to challenge his enemies, sometimes showing an irascible disposition, a product of his military training. He ended up being intensely hated by some of the cabinet members. The conflict of positions worsened due to a bill to promote the arrival of immigrants who would contribute the population component necessary to the development of the country. The need for immigration was not disputed by anyone, since the Dominican territory was practically uninhabited, a situation that conspired against the possibility of the nation carving out the means for its prosperity. Additionally, the demographic disproportion between Haiti and the Dominican Republic was presented as a problem for the perpetuation of independence. It has been estimated that in 1844 the Dominican Republic had around 135,000 inhabitants, while Haiti had a population that exceeded 700,000.

However, the ruling sectors associated the migratory objective with a style of development that implied the preponderance of Europeans or direct descendants, since they saw them as the only agents of progress. For the country to develop, they estimated, it was necessary to have those who brought the work habits and cultural levels that had allowed the civilized advance of Europe. Although they rejected racial politics of any kind, many liberals accepted that whites were the bearers of the idea of progress, which is why they also considered Europeans to be desirable immigrants. In the debates that opened on the occasion of the enunciation of immigration policies, Puello introduced a discordant note. He stated that he did not object to the relevance of the arrival of foreigners so that they could contribute to the aggrandizement of the country, but that they should be of all racial conditions; Otherwise, he noted, white privilege was being sacralized. Consequently, for him the entry of blacks and mulattoes in equal proportions should be encouraged, along with Europeans. He was proposing immigration from nearby countries, such as Puerto Rico, which had a significant black population.

=== Border conflicts and the Battle of Estrelleta ===
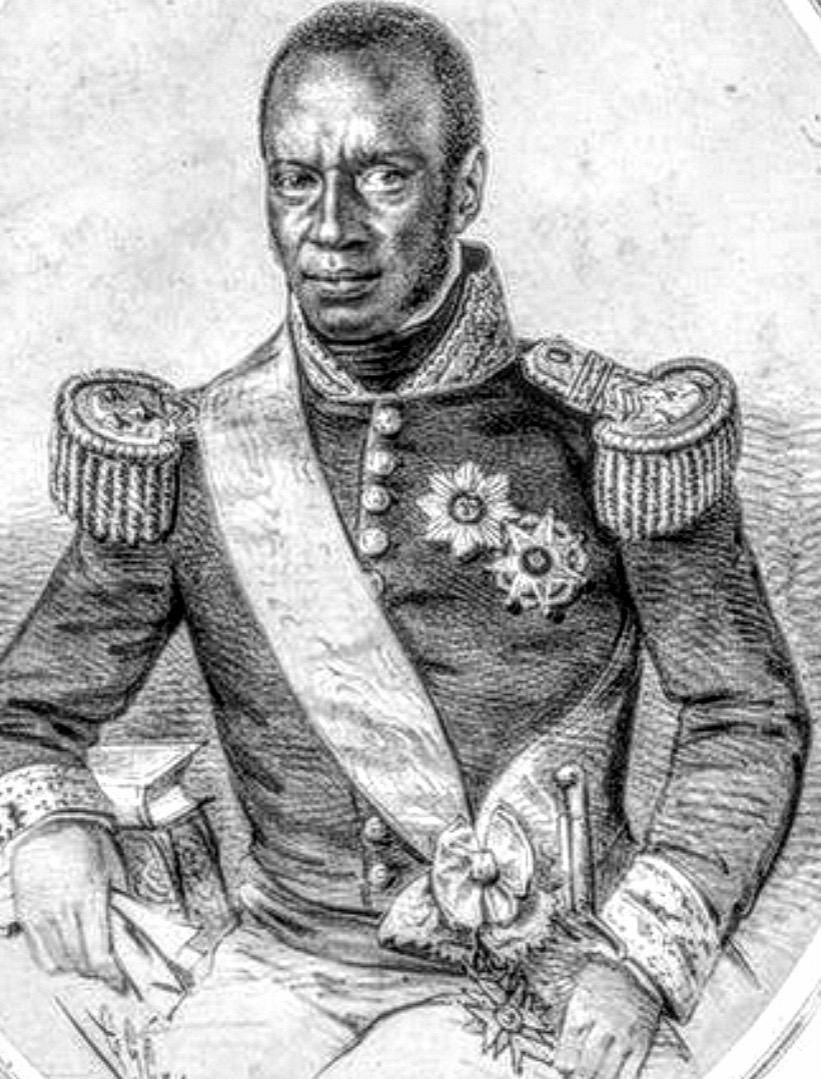
By December 1844, intensified border conflicts triggered the second Haitian invasion by President Jean-Louis Pierrot.

Until 1845, Puello did not participate in any war action of the Dominican War of Independence. During what military historians later called the "First Campaign" lasted, he remained head of the Santo Domingo garrison. At the end of these battles, it was enough for Santana to leave a small troop near the border, under the command of General Antonio Duvergé.

The situation changed when Jean-Louis Pierrot became president of Haiti, at the beginning of 1845, and announced an aggressive disposition against Dominican independence. Hostilities began towards the end of March with small border raids, but in June when a succession of skirmishes began following the Battle of Fort Cachimán, near Bánica, (in present day Elías Piña) in which the fort had been taken from the Haitians by Duvergé in December 1844.

The Dominican Government estimated that the situation was becoming delicate in the border area, where an enemy offensive could occur, and decreed general mobilization. Duvergé had to withdraw at the end of July, it was feared that the front would break and the Haitians would advance to the foot of the wall of Santo Domingo. It was decided to send reinforcements to the Southern Front, and Puello was placed at the vanguard, a sign of the confidence that Santana had in him in the military aspect. He was entrusted with the first division of the Southern Front, with a level of command similar to that of Duvergé. Between August and mid-September 1845, the troops commanded by Puello and Duvergé carried out maneuvers that allowed them to maintain the initiative and prevent the Haitians from crossing the border line.

On 16 September, Puello learned that a concentration of Haitian troops commanded by generals Toussaint, Samedi and Morissette had taken place on the banks of the Matayaya River. Puello tried to buy time so that Duvergé's division, stationed in the Santomé savanna, near San Juan, could meet with his; but to stop the enemy advance, he decided the next day to fight alone. He chose the Estrelleta savannah and divided the troops into two wings, each composed of six battalions, commanded by colonels Bernardino Pérez and Valentín Alcántara. In a dispatch that day, Puello described what happened:

Upon reaching the heights of Mata-Yaya, we perceived the enemy on the opposite bank of the river, and militarily positioned on a range of hills located in the Estrelleta savanna, its only two entrances covered with two pieces of artillery, and a piece of advanced cavalry, quite distant from its general canton. They immediately sighted the column under my command, sounded generala and prepared to wait for us: I answered with our battery and prepared to go into action, which was all my desire, waiting only for the right wing to give the agreed signal. In fact, a quarter of an hour after my arrival the fire broke out, at 8 o'clock in the morning, and the column under my command, flying with the speed of lightning, launched itself at the enemies, mocking their bullets and shrapnel. In an instant they took possession of the artillery pieces and broke the enemy division: the same execution on the left wing; and after 2 hours of lively combat we defeated the Haitians, leaving in our possession the two pieces of artillery, supplies, war chests, some rifles and the field strewn with innumerable corpses, and as many wounded, there being none of us on our part, but 3 slightly injured.

Puello was surely untrue when he stated that there were only three wounded, aware that Santana, for propaganda purposes, would have his part of the battle published in loose sheets. Armies everywhere tend to minimize their losses and exaggerate those of the enemy. Even so, there is no doubt that the Haitian defeat was overwhelming, meaning the end of the offensive on the southern border. Shortly thereafter, on 27 October, a twin victory occurred at the Battle of Beler, on the northern border, under the leadership of General Francisco Antonio Salcedo.

The Battle of Estrelleta was the most important war event that had occurred with Haiti up to that point, both in the sense of the number of troops involved and the scope of the victory. This triumph has been considered the most virtuous from a military point of view, since Puello demonstrated his skill in the way he deployed the columns and moved them to thwart the enemy advance. Men at arms who would take part in successive combats distinguished themselves, such as José María Cabral and Valentín Alcántara. But, above all, this victory meant the ratification of the capacity of the Dominicans, to the extent that no new Haitian incursions took place until 1849. The importance of the victory was recognized by Santana, who shortly after decided to appoint Puello as minister of the Interior and Police, replacing Tomás Bobadilla, with whom he had had serious disagreements. According to historian Víctor Garrido, while Santana privileged relations with France, Bobadilla opposed the payment of the debt installment contracted by Haiti in 1825. This maneuver confirms how Santana used the ascendancy of Puello, at that time at its zenith for the Estrelleta's triumph, to settle disputes with other prominent men on the conservative side.

According to historian José Gabriel García, this designation exacerbated the animosity of the conservatives towards Puello, because he was seen as better positioned to oppose the annexation projects. Garrido adds that the conflict became evident during the visit of the Spanish colonel Pablo Llenas, at the beginning of 1846, when he was put on alert to prevent any attempt to alter the existing political balance. But Puello continued to be a key piece in Santana's power racket, as was verified on delicate occasions. One of them was the refusal of recruits from the San Cristóbal area to march towards the front, at the beginning of 1845, on the occasion of the offensive announced by Pierrot. On that occasion it was considered that there was a racial motivation, since the conspirators objected to the dominance of the whites, which is why they did not wish to oppose Haiti. Despite his favorable positions towards the population of African origin, in the face of an attack against the security of the State, Puello decided to act with a toughness that was part of his personality. He moved to the scene of the events and ordered punishments against the dissidents, which included the imprisonment of General Manuel Mora, until then a supporter of Santana. The second time he showed that military energy was during the reduction of an attempted mutiny of troops on the border, in protest of the difficult living conditions they were going through, and he assumed responsibility for arranging the execution of two officers considered generators of the discomfort.

== Indictment, Trial and execution ==
From mid-1847, Santana's position began to weaken. It is possible that the initial cause of such a turn lay in the unfavorable economic situation, a product of the crisis that was beginning to manifest itself in the economies of Europe, which would later escalate into the Revolutions of 1848. Disagreements proliferated in the ruling circles and the removal of Santana was considered, who was blamed for the preponderance of the clique of corrupt officials who did not care about the country's problems. A debate was opened within the cabinet and Puello was seen as a presidential candidate, whose purpose would be to favor people of color.

As part of this state of decomposition, a conspiracy was developed led by the Minister of War and Navy, General Manuel Jiménes, who, perhaps because of their common origin among the Trinitarios, proposed to Puello to be part of the plan, which the second rejection. The refusal gave rise to some hostility on the part of Jiménes against Puello, which has been misinterpreted by some historians who have come to the conclusion that Puello's misfortune was caused by Jiménes's maneuvers.

In reality, it was the staunch conservatives, like José María Caminero, who prepared a file to ruin Puello's influence. The hostility bore fruit. From a certain moment, Santana showed his displeasure against Puello, suspecting that he harbored the intention of becoming president and decided to wait for the opportunity to dismiss him. What happened at the end of 1847 in the spheres of power has remained quite obscure in its details, because unfounded explanations have been issued. Despite this lack of clarity on some aspects, there is no doubt, as historian Víctor Garrido highlights, that Puello was the victim of an intrigue of vast proportions. The first indicator was the dismissal of his position in the Interior and Police and his appointment as head of the Ministry of Finance, a position that did not correspond to his military status.

In any case, Santana kept him as interim head of the Ministry of the Interior and Police, although already the object of suspicion. There are indications that Jiménes, aware of what awaited his cabinet colleague, tried to protect him, but he had to do so carefully, already determined to find the means to force Santana's resignation. In this context, a conspiracy was announced whose supposed purpose was to establish a black dictatorship. It can be asserted that such a plot never existed, but Santana took advantage of the complaint to dismiss him. Due to his position, it was up to Puello to investigate the alleged plot, but he was detained by order of the president, who relied on article 210 of the 1844 Constitution, which granted him dictatorial powers, to form a commission in charge of judging the case.

At that moment it was clear that Santana sought Puello's execution, but he decided, as on other occasions, to give it judicial legality. He went so far as to impose his criteria that the death penalty be applied, interpreting that 11 votes in favor made up the majority, despite the fact that there were 13 votes divided between freedom, prison and exile. Rarely in the history of the country has such a crude file been fabricated in order to justify a previously decided execution.

Santana, stubborn in his intention to get rid of the former minister, obtained the death sentence on 22 December 1847. He had him shot the next day, so as not to give time for the clamor of society to manifest itself, since almost everyone was convinced that the "negrophile" conspiracy was non-existent. As on other occasions, Santana decided to punish close relatives of the affected person with the death penalty. General Gabino Puello, who did not even live in the city, and the uncle of the Puello brothers, Pedro de Castro, were involved in the ghostly attempt, both of whom were shot along with Joaquín Puello on 23 December 1847.

== See also ==
- Battle of Estrelleta
- Battle of Fort Cachimán
- Battle of Beler
- Eusebio Puello
- Francisco del Rosario Sánchez
- Antonio Duvergé
- Manuel Jiménes
- Pedro Santana
