= Gallivan =

Gallivan may refer to:

Surname:

- Brian Gallivan, American actor, writer and comedian
- Britney Gallivan (born 1985), of Pomona, California, paper-folding theorist
- Craig Gallivan (born 1984), Welsh actor, played Callum Watson in Footballers Wives
- Danny Gallivan (1917–1993), Canadian radio and television broadcaster and sportscaster
- James A. Gallivan (1866–1928), United States Representative from Massachusetts
- Joe Gallivan (born 1937), American jazz and avant-garde musician
- John W. Gallivan (1915–2012), American newspaper publisher, cable television pioneer and civic leader
- Jonathan Gallivan, Toronto-based producer, musician, and multi-media developer for Gallivan Media
- Patrick M. Gallivan (born 1960), member of the New York State Senate and the former Sheriff of Erie County
- Phil Gallivan (1907–1969), pitcher in Major League Baseball

Places:

- Gallivan, Saskatchewan, unincorporated community in Cut Knife Rural Municipality No. 439, Saskatchewan, Canada
- Gallivan Boulevard (Massachusetts Route 203), in Boston, Massachusetts, United States
- Gallivan Center (opened in 1993), urban plaza in the heart of downtown Salt Lake City, Utah
- Gallivan Plaza (UTA station), light rail station in Downtown Salt Lake City, Utah, United States

== See also ==
- Gallivant
- Galvan
