= Eusebio Puello =

Dominican soldier (1811–1871)

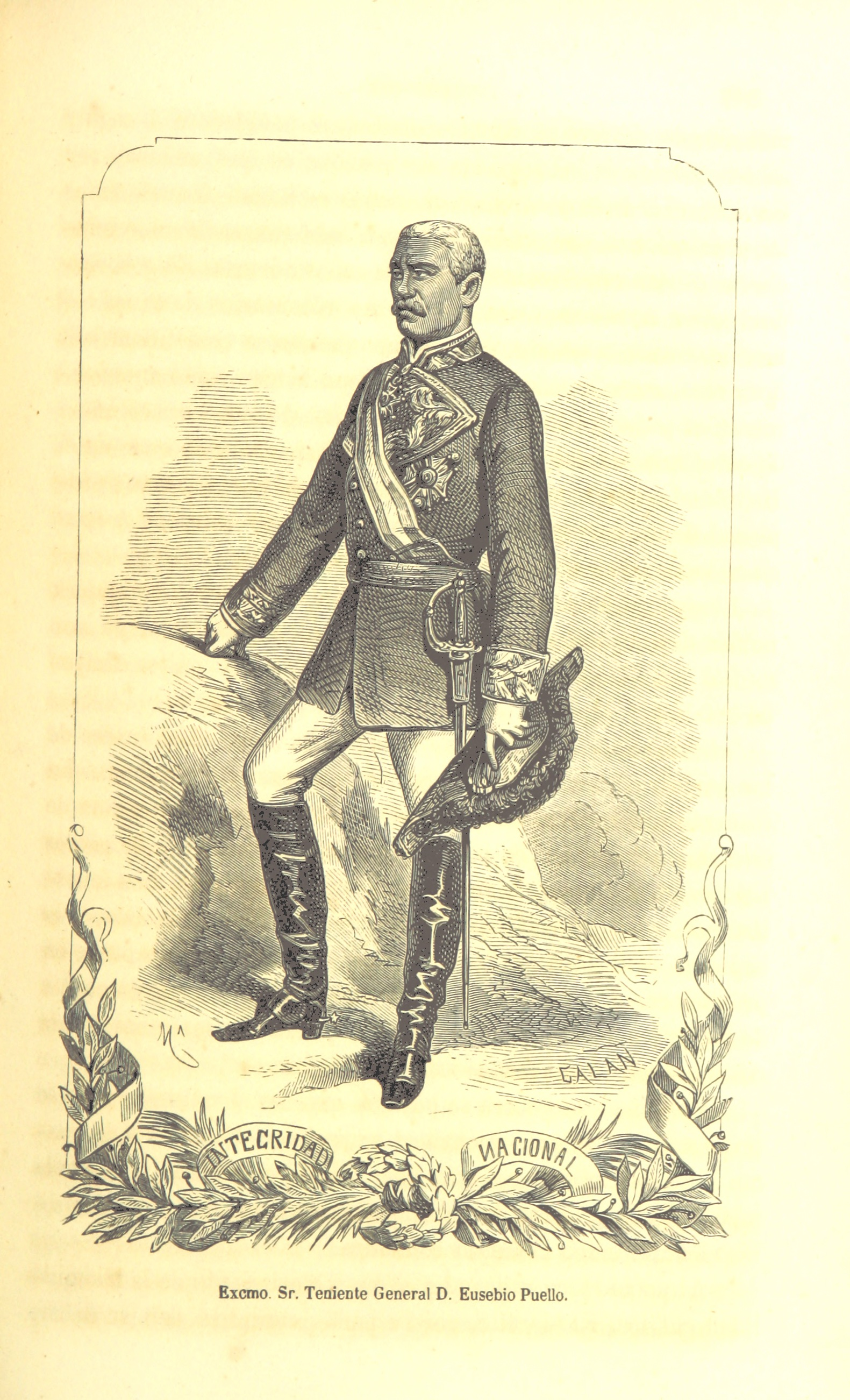
- Portrait of Puello
- Born: Eusebio Puello de Castro; 1811; Santo Domingo, Captaincy General of Santo Domingo
- Died: December 15, 1871 (aged 60); Havana, Captaincy General of Cuba
- Relatives: José Joaquín Puello (brother); Gabino Puello (brother)
- Military career
- Allegiance: Dominican Republic; Spain
- Branch: (Haiti) Haitian Army; Dominican Army; Spanish Army
- Service years: 1824–1871
- Rank: Major general
- Conflicts: Dominican War of Independence; Cibaeño Revolution; Dominican Restoration War; Ten Years' War

Eusebio Puello de Castro (1811 – December 15, 1871) was a Dominican general who displayed great leadership skills and bravery; he stood out during the Dominican War of Independence.

After serving in the Haitian regime, he joined the Dominican independence movement and signed the Manifesto of January 16, 1844. He was among the many participants in the revolt that led to the proclamation of the First Dominican Republic on February 27, 1844. He would soon rise to prominence in the many battles against Haiti, much like his brothers José Joaquín and Gabino.

However, unlike his patriotic brothers, Eusebio began to switch alliance to Spain beginning in the 1860s following Spain's annexation of the country. As a general for the Spanish Army, he fought vigorously against the Dominican insurgents in the Dominican Restoration War. By 1865, Spain lost its dominance on the island, leading numerous Dominicans, including Puello, to emigrate to Cuba or Puerto Rico. In Cuba, when the Ten Years' War broke out, Puello defended Spanish interests with conviction and led many military operations of Spanish troops against the Mambise rebels. He would remain loyal to Spain until his death in 1871.

== Early years ==
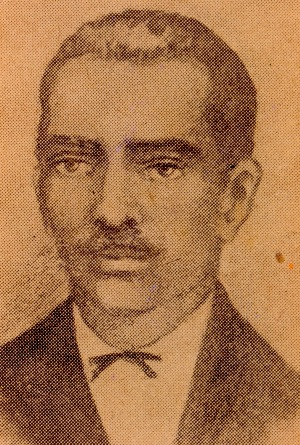
José Joaquín Puello, Eusebio's older brother, was the most prominent among the brothers.

Eusebio Puello was born in 1811 in the city of Santo Domingo, when Dominican Republic was still under Spanish rule. He was the second son of the marriage of Martín Joaquín Puello (1782–1864) and María Mercedes de Castro, both free blacks. (His brothers, José Joaquín and Gabino, also stood out in the Dominican War of Independence, in which the three brothers were coined as "The Puello Brothers").

In 1822, early in the Haitian regime of Santo Domingo by the troops of Haitian President Jean-Pierre Boyer, Eusebio was recruited to join the Haitian Army due to the implementation of conscription. Although due to his young age, he could not join the army immediately. Finally in June 1824, he joined as first corporal of the 31st regiment, and over time he rose to reach the rank of second lieutenant. In 1840, he achieved the rank of captain, but his military career was cut short after the fall of Boyer in 1843, leading to his retirement along with other officers loyal to the overthrown government.

After his service with the Haitian regime ended, Eusebio joined the independence movement led by Francisco del Rosario Sánchez, with his brothers also joining. He showed a determined commitment to the cause by signing the Manifesto of January 16, 1844. On February 24, he attended the meeting of patriots that made the historic determination to carry out the pronouncement on the night of February 27, and was present at the Santo Domingo pronouncement of 1844, held at the Puerta del Conde, where the First Dominican Republic was proclaimed.

== Military career ==
=== Dominican Republic ===
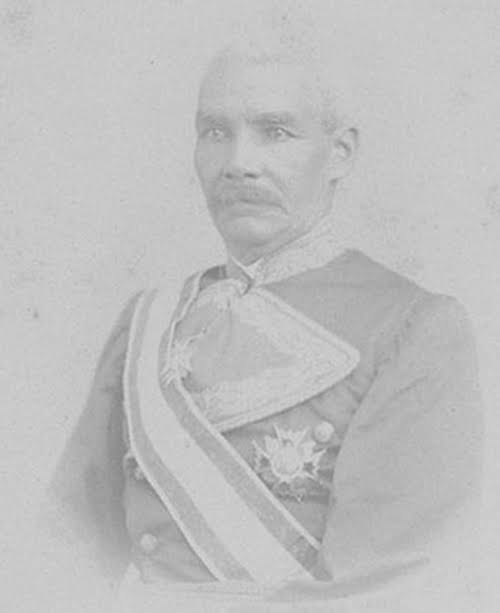
Photograph of Eusebio Puello, c. 1850s

This participation earned him the Central Government Board to confirm the rank of captain that had been granted to him by the Haitian Government. Being President, Pedro Santana elevated him to the rank of lieutenant colonel. In 1845, he went to San Cristóbal at the head of a troop to quell a rebellion that had broken out in that town and he was entrusted with the execution of the insurgents.

In that same year he was appointed infantry commander in order to appease Puerto Plata. When his brothers José Joaquín and Gabino were accused by Santana of leading a conspiracy against the Government, a process that ended with their execution, Eusebio was accused as an accomplice and sentenced to three years of confinement and loss of his military rank. Shortly afterward, he was released and reinstated in military service. Appointed first chief of the Second Battalion of the Dominican regiment based in Santo Domingo, he was assigned to the General Staff of Santana, until in 1849, he received the rank of colonel. In 1852, he was appointed Sub-govornor of El Seibo and a briefly served as a military instructor to a battalion. From 1853 to 1854, he held the rank of commander in arms of Sabana de la Mar and temporarily that of El Seibo, later obtaining ownership of that of San Juan de la Maguana. In 1855, when the invasion of Haitian Emperor Faustin I occurred, General Juan Contreras entrusted him with the direction of the Battle of Santomé, in which he inflicted a crushing defeat on the invading Haitian forces.

When Buenaventura Báez returned to power in 1856, he appointed him commander of Las Matas de Farfán. While in that position, the Cibaeño Revolution occurred. As a prisoner, he was sent to that city, where he agreed to fight the Samaná rebels, but he failed and had to be evacuated by General Matías Ramón Mella. Without giving up, he regrouped his troops and on May 4, 1858, he entered that town after a long and hard-fought battle. He remained there until August 1859, when he returned to the capital. A month later, another rebellion was declared in Azua, where he went with General Antonio Abad Alfau.

=== Spain ===
==== Dominican Restoration War ====
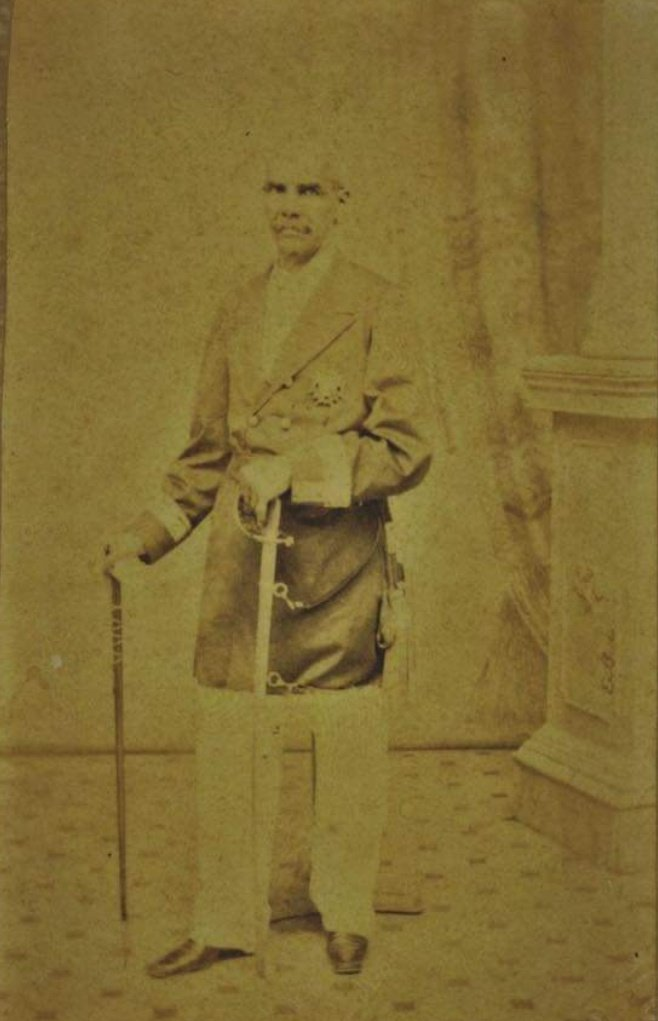
Puello in Santo Domingo c. 1864

In August 1863, a revolution broke out in the Cibao with the aim of restoring the Dominican Republic. Puello asked for a company to garrison San Juan, but his request was denied, causing the revolution to spread to all the towns in the district of Azua. On September 30, 1863, Puello received information about the approach of the rebels from San Juan towards the city of Azua. He organized his troops at strategic points and, after receiving early warning on October 1, 1863, he confronted the rebels at the Jura River. Despite the difficulties of the battle due to the narrow road and enemy fire from the woods, Puello ordered a vigorous advance and achieved a victory, capturing ammunition, shrapnel, and prisoners of war. On October 6, the revolutionaries took the city of Baní, and on the next day, San Cristóbal revolted, leaving Azua cut off from the Dominican capital. Faced with this situation, Felipe Rivero ordered Puello to evacuate Azua, also adding the news of an alleged independence conspiracy in Santo Domingo. Both Puello and other military leaders were summoned to Santo Domingo. A few days later, Spanish troops and loyalists evacuated Azua towards Santo Domingo. That same day, General Pedro Florentino took control of the city. He was later named second in command of the division commanded by General José de la Gándara and together they marched on San Cristóbal after having had several battles in which Puello emerged victorious. The next day, he faced the rebels in Fundación and then went to Moja-Casave where he also defeated another enemy faction. Later, he left for Palmar de Fundación where the separatist rebel force was entrenched, which was completely defeated after a fierce battle. Later he returned to San Cristóbal and from there he marched towards Baní, facing all the insurrections that previously disputed the passage.

From Baní, he fought approximately 500 Dominican insurgents who were in Alto de la Cruz, causing 50 deaths and some injuries to the rebels through a false retreat, and managing to capture three flags. He then returned to Baní and on December 4, 1863, marched towards Azua in command of the vanguard of José de la Gándara's division. On December 6, they entered Azua after the defeated enemy had hastily abandoned the town. For these actions and his performance in the Battle of Jura, he was promoted to field marshal by Queen Isabella II. On December 24, he left for San Juan and took the town after a slight resistance. Then, he continued his way through Las Matas de Farfán until reaching the border town of Bánica. From there he returned to Azua due to a call from De la Gándara to go out together to take Neiba, which they did by fighting the rebels and taking a large trench they had on the banks of the La Sequia stream. Afterwards he went towards Barahona, where he also fought the separatists, took the town and seized a rebel artillery piece. Then he returned to Azua by order of Governor Carlos de Vargas, remaining as General Commander of the Azua district.

In early December 1864, Marshal Puello received confidential information about a possible change of attitude in the inhabitants of the village of Neiba, who were apparently willing to recognize the authority of Spain again. Driven by his pro-Spanish patriotism, Puello sent a column to invade Neiba. However, upon arrival, his troops found the village totally abandoned and did not have enough rations to continue the operation as planned. On December 4, the Spanish expedition was caught in an ambush on the mountain of La Canela, where they faced rebel forces led by José María Cabral. Despite the brave fight of the Spanish forces, they were forced to retreat, and the rebels managed to capture prisoners, mules, and weapons. This defeat at the Battle of La Canela allowed the insurgents to regain control of Neyba on December 5. By late 1864, although the Spanish appeared to be winning the war, a major territorial loss had occurred with the fall of El Seibo. However, this conflict had come at a high cost in terms of lives and resources. Diseases, such as yellow fever, had caused numerous casualties in the Spanish ranks, placing an unsustainable burden on Spain. Furthermore, during the course of the war, the rebels had carried out devastating actions in important cities such as Santiago de los Caballeros and Puerto Plata, burning them down and causing damage valued at some 5,000,000 pesos.

In that context, Ramón María Narváez adopted an abandonist policy and the Spanish Cortes approved the abandonment of Santo Domingo; Isabel II of Spain signed a decree on March 3, 1865, that annulled the annexation of Santo Domingo to Spain. Puello continued as Commander General of the Azua district until June 5, 1865, when the evacuation of Azua was ordered. Before leaving, he received the decoration of the Grand Cross of the Order Isabel la Católica. Faithful to his true nationality, Puello was one of the three Dominican generals who left for mainland Spain. In Santo Domingo, he lost property and family that was left in poverty after having been a prisoner of the enemy, accompanying him to his new destination on the island of Cuba, where he was granted the barracks for the city of Havana.

==== Ten Years' War ====
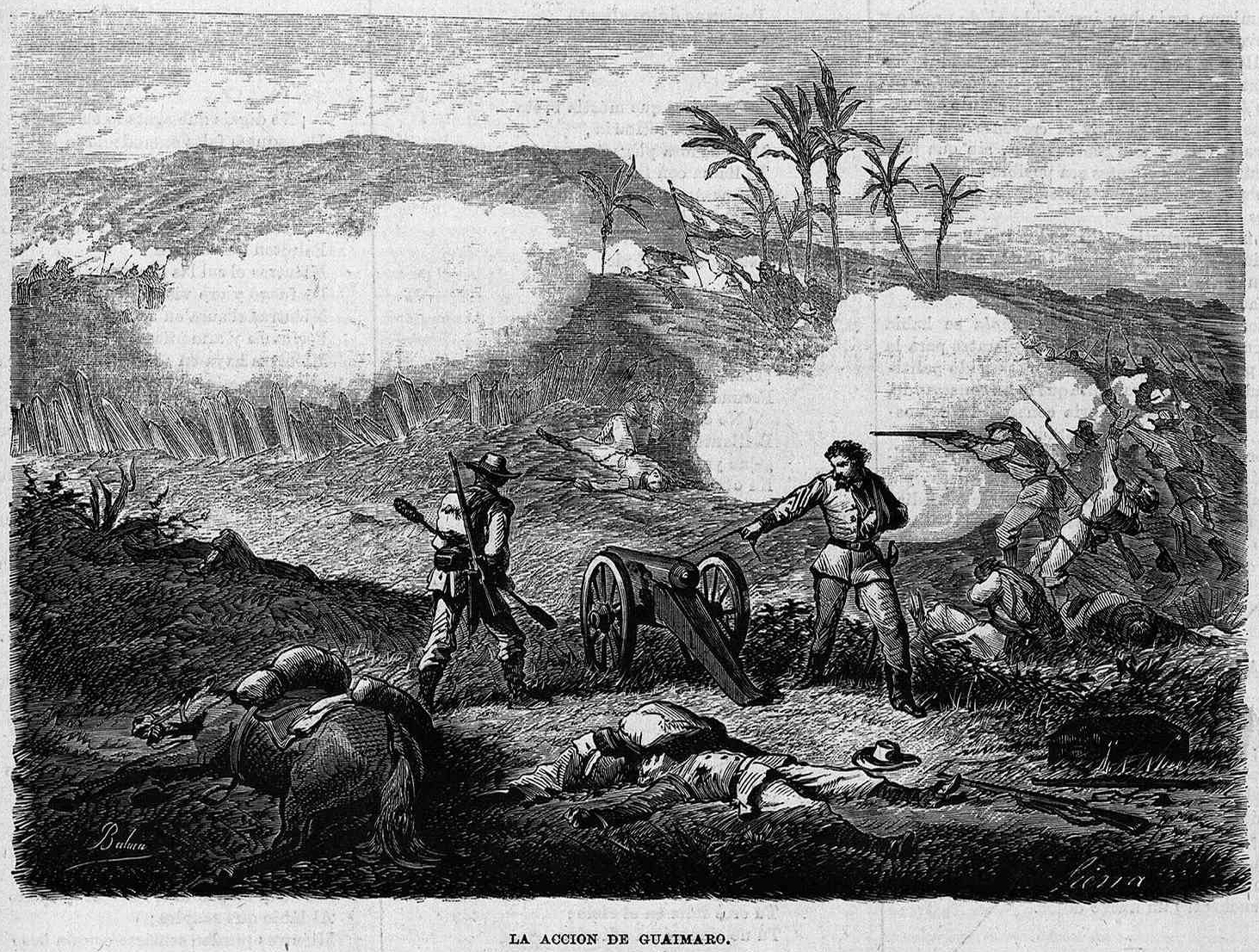
Even after Spain's defeat by Dominican forces in 1865, Puello remained loyal to the Spanish Empire. This was proven through his participation in the Ten Years' War against Cuban independence fighters.

After the Dominican Republic recovered its sovereignty in 1865, he went to Cuba, where his marshalship was recognized. Three years later, in the last months of 1868, the insurrection broke out in Cuba that started the Ten Years' War, and the Government considered it opportune to use Puello's services. At that time, some Dominican compatriots who had loyally served the Spanish crown chose to join the ranks of the Cuban Liberation Army, such as Máximo Gómez, Modesto Díaz and Félix Marcano. However, Puello demonstrated an ardent enthusiasm for defending the Spanish national integrity and assumed command of the troops operating in the jurisdictions of Sancti Spíritus, Morón, Remedios and Ciego de Ávila. At that time, the insurrection presented an imposing aspect and was encouraged by the hope of an imminent independence triumph.

For five months, Puello fulfilled his duty and conscience, traveling more than 300 leagues by day and night, relentlessly pursuing the enemy and sharing the fatigue of war with the soldiers. He crossed dangerous rivers, climbed rugged mountains and penetrated ancient forests, which served as hideouts for the insurgents. In each confrontation, he achieved a new triumph for the arms of Spain wherever he caught up with the rebels.

Later, in the city of Puerto Príncipe, (currently known as Camagüey), it was threatened by the most powerful and best organized Mambí Army, which planned to take the city to give importance to the movement before the world. It was at this time that Puello was named General Commander of the Central Department. Upon arriving in the city, he found a horrible and desperate situation. War, desolation, fires, hunger and diseases, such as yellow fever and cholera, had turned Puerto Príncipe into a corpse on the verge of the grave. The situation was critical, but Puello did not faint in the face of so many misfortunes and undertook superhuman efforts to save the critical situation. He cut down the forest that surrounded the city, where the rebels were hiding to kill the defenseless Spanish soldiers. In addition, he built forts to protect the city from surprises, promoted the repair of the railroad and abundantly supplied the population with food. Although illness affected the troops, to the point of not having enough strength to cover the service of the city, their immense will allowed them to overcome all these adversities. But Puello was still to face a new test, one that would put his perseverance and the courage of his soldiers to the test. The insurgents, aware of the sad situation in Puerto Príncipe, dared to try to take the city by surprise. However, Puello, at the head of a small group of soldiers, marched on the enemy and defeated them, personally pursuing them to within a league of the town.

Meanwhile, for more than a year, the insurrection had prevailed in the towns of Guáimaro, Cascorro and Sibanicú, establishing in the first of these its self-proclaimed capital of the Republic of Cuba. During that year, not a single Spanish soldier had penetrated those places, which were about twenty leagues from Puerto Príncipe. But Puello could not tolerate the so-called Government of Free Cuba existing peacefully in the territory under his command. Therefore, on December 25, 1869, he led an expedition with 1,200 men of all arms towards those points, finally arriving on December 30 of the same year at the small and desolate rebel capital, which had been razed by the Cuban rebels after several encounters along the way.

Puello later received advance information about the large trenches that the rebels had built at Palo Quemado. Worried about the situation, he decided to inform the Captain General of Cuba, Antonio Caballero y Fernández de Rodas. However, to his surprise, this confidential news was published in the newspapers, which allowed the rebels to change their plan and build a formidable trench at the Juan Rodríguez Mines, near Guáimaro, on the road to Palo Quemado. Confident of victory, the insurrection gathered en masse at this strategic point, encouraged by the presence of its self-proclaimed republican government and led by the generals in whom the insurgents had the greatest confidence, such as Ignacio Agramonte and the adventurer Thomas Jordan, an American who had fought in the Confederate Army during the American Civil War and who now held the position of generalissimo of the Cuban Liberation Army.

On January 1, 1870, in the early hours of the morning, the troops under Puello's command found themselves ambushed at the vanguard, receiving a surprise and accurate discharge from the enemy. Without hesitation, Puello advanced to the vanguard, where there were two artillery pieces, but unfortunately these were disabled at that crucial moment. However, Puello ordered the other two artillery pieces to be brought from the center of the column and advanced to the front, personally facing the enemy artillery protected by his own. Despite the setbacks he experienced, the Spanish artillery behaved admirably in that terrible action.

The fighting was fierce, with the Cuban rebels defending the bastion of independence with double or triple the strength and precision weapons, while the Spanish soldiers fought bare-chested, even though many of them were novices. Despite the enemy's immense advantages, Puello, slightly wounded and with his horse dead, continued to advance toward the enemy trench, determined to die rather than retreat a step. With only 18 men he managed to seize the enemy trench, forcing the disheartened rebels to flee. From that moment on, (and only from that moment on), the self-proclaimed capital of the Republic of Cuba disappeared. Some 50 soldiers gave their lives on that day. Puello, despite his wounds and setbacks, regretted not having found death there, because his commitment and courage never wavered in the fight to defend national integrity and the peace of the homeland.

== Death ==
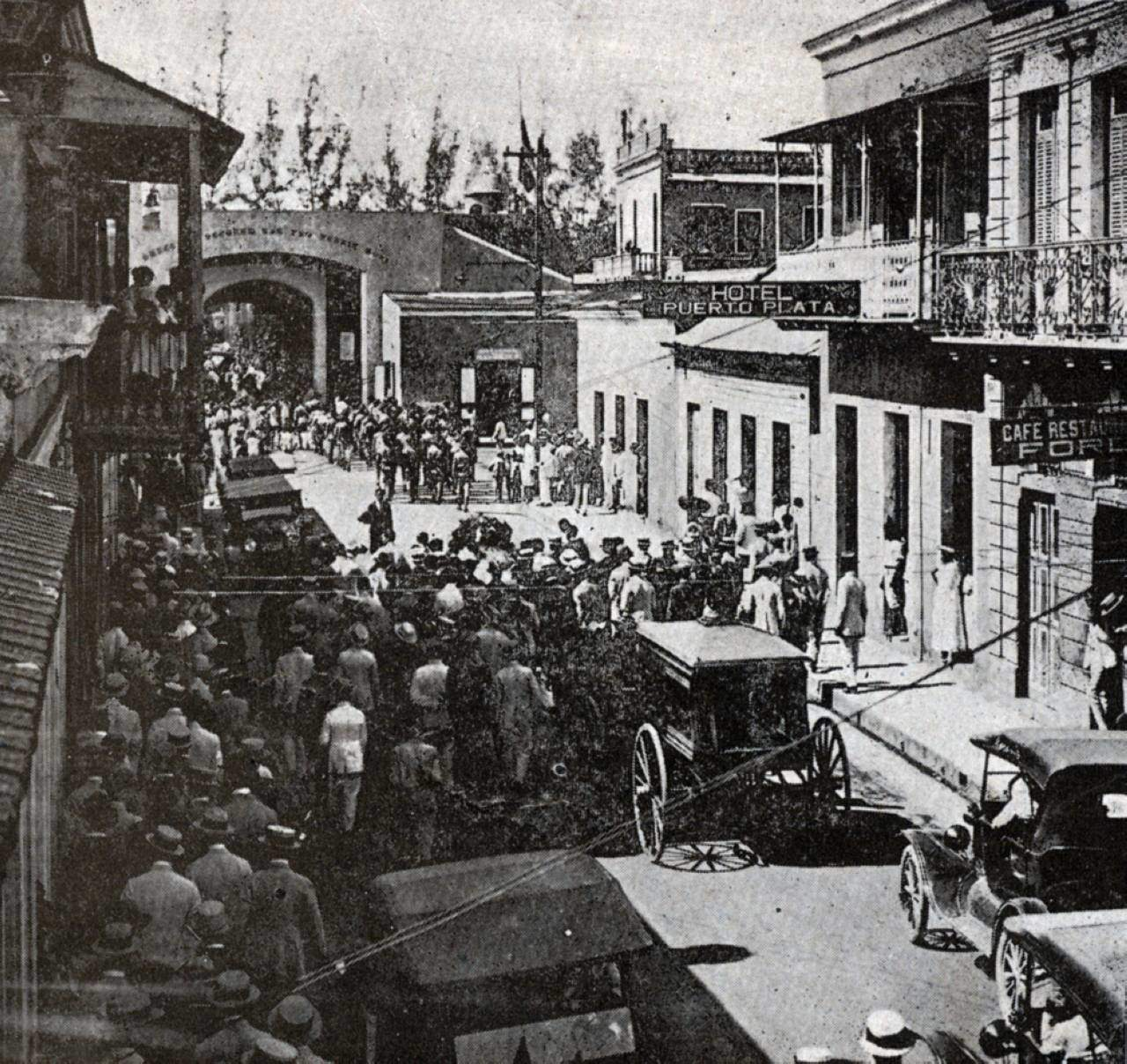
Funeral of Eusebio Puello in Santo Domingo

Despite his bravery and loyalty to Spain, Puello was the subject of unfounded criticism that questioned his military knowledge. However, he demonstrated on the battlefield his ability to conduct war in the difficult and wild terrain typical of irregular warfare. On April 1, 1870, he arrived in Havana, with Victoriano Suances temporarily in charge of command. Puello was to leave for the peninsula in early May of that year. General Caro had been appointed in his place and took charge of the general command of the Central.

He died in the middle of the campaign in Nuevitas on December 15, 1871, at age 60. He was survived by his family, including his ten children, (conceived with five different women), and he was given great funeral honors.

== Bibliography ==
- Biographical Features of His Excellency Mr. General Eusebio Puello Y Castro and the Exposition He Directed to His Majesty the King Months Before His Death. Wentworth Press Publishing. August 1, 2018
- Garrido, Víctor. Los Puello. Santo Domingo, 1974.

== See also ==
- José Joaquín Puello
- Marcos Evangelista Adon
- Ten Years' War
- Dominican Restoration War
