= Galvano =

Galvano is an Italian masculine given name and surname from Latin Galbanus and Galba. Notable people with the name include:

== Given name ==
- Galvano Becchini (fl. 1361–1382), Italian theologian
- Galvano da Levanto (died c. 1312), Italian physician
- Galvano Della Volpe (1895–1968), Italian philosopher
- Galvano Fiamma (1283–1344), Italian chronicler

== Surname ==
- Bill Galvano (born 1966), American politician
- Mauro Galvano (born 1964), Italian boxer

== See also ==
- Galvão (Portuguese)
- Galván (Spanish)
- Galvani
