= Tomás Bobadilla =

Dominican writer and politician (1785–1871)

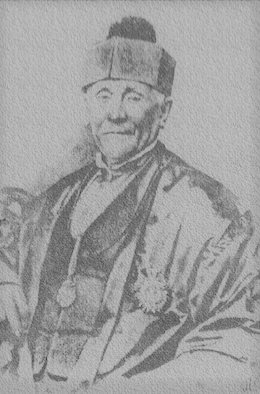
- Bobadilla c. 1860s

President of the Dominican Republic
- In office 1 March 1844 – 9 June 1844
- Preceded by: Francisco del Rosario Sánchez
- Succeeded by: Francisco del Rosario Sánchez

Personal details
- Born: 30 March 1785 Neiba, Captaincy General of Santo Domingo
- Died: 21 December 1871 (aged 86) Port-au-Prince, Haiti
- Occupation: Politician and writer

Tomás Bobadilla y Briones (30 March 1785 – 21 December 1871) was a writer, intellectual, and politician from the Dominican Republic. As the first president of the Dominican Republic, he was key in the Dominican independence movement.

Bobadilla led a prolonged and intese public life, serving in the most diverse scenarios: Under España Boba since 1810; in the "State" created by José Núñez de Cáceres in 1821; during the Haitian occupation almost until 1844; then with the Trinitarios, even drafting the "Manifesto of January 16" which served as the manifesto of independence in 1844. Later, he occupied all the existing Ministries and Portfolios of the nascent republic, of which one of the measures included the abolition of slavery. While he supported annexation to Spain in 1861 ("without enthusiasm" according to historian Roberto Cassá) and eventually again as a nationalist until his death, on December 21, 1871.

== Early life ==
=== Birth and family origins ===
Born in Neiba on 30 March 1785, son of Vicente Bobadilla Amaral, and Gregoria Justina Briones Pérez. He was born at a time when the colony of Santo Domingo was in relative prosperity. But this phase ended with the border wars of the last decade of the 18th century and the annexation of the territory to France in 1795. Many inhabitants of the border areas moved to Azua, Baní or other places less exposed to incursions from the neighboring region. His parents emigrated to Puerto Rico, like many other refugees, when it became clear that the Haitian revolutionaries were on the verge of defeating the French. The hardships of emigration probably marked him for the rest of his life, since his parents surely went through difficult times. This theort is supported by the fact that the parents returned in 1810, that is, as soon as the Spanish sovereignty was reestablished. It could be asserted that the tenacious decision not to abandon Dominican soil that he showed for the rest of his life, a key explanatory of his political behavior, was due to this unfortunate experience of youth.

Despite the probable difficulty in which his parents survived while they lived abroad, Bobadilla probably received administrative training that put him in a position to hold a position in the colonial government. (When he reached the age of majority in force at that time, 25 years of age, Bobadilla obtained his certification of Blood Purity, as all of both his paternal grandparents and maternal great-grandparents had been born in Europe, this certificate allowed him access to high public offices of the colonial administration, reserved to white Dominicans and Peninsulars). Historian Ramón Lugo Lovatón says that while in exile in Mayagüez, Bobadilla managed to get a job in a public notary's office, an occupation that provided him with the first rudiments of practicing law. But he did not receive a university education, not even after he returned to Santo Domingo. Hence, his intellectual and legal training was the product of self-taught activity.

Despite his experiences and ability, Bobadilla took pride in feeling like a man of the people he led a simple life, delighting in the typical Dominican pleasures, such as cockfights, horseback riding or dancing in the endless fandangos. He was noted as an unrepentant womanizer, despite his stern character. His personal economic support was the result of the combination of administrative positions and mahogany cutting, an activity that connected him with the rural environment. In his correspondence he states, until shortly before his death, he frequently traveled to the rugged locations of his mahogany cuts, north of Baní, to complete logging expeditions.

=== Marriage, and early political career ===
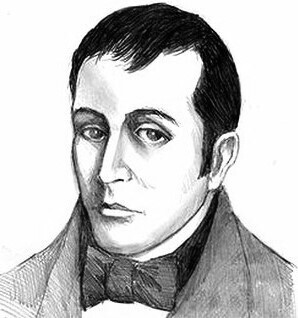
Bobadilla in his early career was active in politics, including as an active member in the government of his friend and early independence leader, José Núñez de Cáceres.

His domestic life was not initially impacted by his government service, since he lived with his common-law wife for over decade prior to getting married. María Virginia Desmier D'Olbreuse, was the daughter of French emigrants who also was a widow in two occasions. Their children were born out of wedlock, but he legally recognized them. In May 1832 the couple legally formalized their marital situation, both civilly and ecclesiastically. His nickname for María Virgina was "La Madama", which alluded to her French origin. The relationship, however, was stormy, and his wife ended up separating from him when she found out about one of his affairs; The marriage produced six children, the first five born out of wedlock: María del Carmen Leonor (b. 1823), María Vicenta (b. 1824), Gerardo (b. 1827), Carlos Tomás (b. 1830), José María (b. 1830); they had a daughter after their wedding: Clemencia Antonia (who was the mother of archbishop and interim president Adolfo Alejandro Nouel).

His quick into the Spanish government apparatus could have been due to the orientation of favoring those recently returned from emigration, as a way of rewarding loyalty to the king, compensating them for the hardships suffered and encouraging others to follow their example. Back in his native country, Bobadilla alternated the practice of law with holding positions in government. Thanks to the experience gained in Puerto Rico, in 1811 he held the position of public notary, which he held until 1822. Shortly after, he was appointed chief notary of the Archbishopric of the Diocese of Santo Domingo, a role expanded not long after with the position of secretary.

In 1813 Bobadilla was appointed secretary of the Provincial Council, which served for less than two years, while the Constitution of 1812 remained in force. In 1817 he acquired a notary office, which allowed him to consolidate himself in the legal profession. Finally, he obtained the positions of city councilor and trustee of Santo Domingo in 1820. During that time he considered himself a Spanish citizen, but such identity did not prevent him from accepting the appointment of first officer of the State Treasury granted to him by José Núñez de Cáceres, president of the ad-hoc Independent State of Spanish Haiti, a product of the overthrow of Spanish domination. Although he was 35 years old, he was not yet a figure of the first order, despite enjoying the confidence of successive Spanish governors as well as Núñez de Cáceres.

=== During the Haitian regime ===
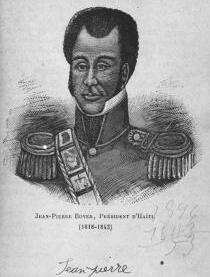
Haitian president Jean-Pierre Boyer

In accordance with the situation created by the invasion of the Haitian president Jean-Pierre Boyer at the beginning of 1822, and determined not to abandon the country, Bobadilla decided to adopt the republican principles that in theory governed Haiti. He was among the few Dominicans who held positions continuously in the Haitian administration and showed effectiveness in collaborating in the name of freedom and equality. In particular he gained the esteem of President Boyer himself, as well as the governor of the Department of Santo Domingo, Jérôme-Maximilien Borgella.

At the beginning of his services to the new rulers, a month after Boyer returned to Port-au-Prince in 1822, Bobadilla was named to a education commission. Months later he was appointed prosecutor of El Seibo. In 1830, he was confirmed as a lawyer, then called public defender, and the following year he again received the appointment of notary public of Santo Domingo. His prestige in Haitian ruling circles increased with Spain's claim to sovereignty over Santo Domingo in 1830, through the mission of Felipe Dávila Fernández de Castro. Bobadilla wrote a panphlet titled, Observations on the official notes of the plenipotentiary of the King of Spain and those of the Republic of Haiti on the claim and possession of the Eastern part. In this text, it is based on the assumption that Spanish domination was characterized by the exercise of cruelties that led to the extinction of the only people vested with the right of possession, the indigenous people. In accordance with liberal principles, for him the political order should originate in the will of the community, which is why he considered that the Dominican people had expressed their will to join Haiti. He went so far as to declare Boyer an "angel of peace" for having instituted a just regime that ended slavery and oppression.

In the same way, Bobadilla tried to do everything possible to represent the interests of his social environment. While remaining faithful to the rulers, he gained prestige among the population as a competent and experienced lawyer, who managed to mitigate the rigors of foreign overlords. In 1840, on the occasion of the announcement of the implementation of the abolition of the common land system, Bobadilla, together with José Joaquín del Monte, moved to the Haitian capital in order to advocate for the repeal of the provision. At the beginning of the occupation, in July 1824, the Haitian Government had in fact ignored the legality of the system of common titles, the most widespread form of land ownership, by ordering that these extensions, in which multiple co-owners coexisted, be subdivided and individual titles were awarded to the co-owners. Boyer immediately renounced applying this provision because it could generate disturbances among the owners of herds and other portions of the population who, in one way or another, achieved their livelihood protected by that system. But, urged by the fiscal deficit, in 1840 Boyer ordered the payment of a tax of 25 pesos for every thousand feet of mahogany cut, a way of ignoring the validity of the property titles, which generated heated protests. Bobadilla and Delmonte managed to have the measure annulled, which increased their prestige, mainly among individuals of a certain social level, mostly linked to the lumber business.

== Independence of Dominican Republic ==
=== Alliance with the Trinitarios ===
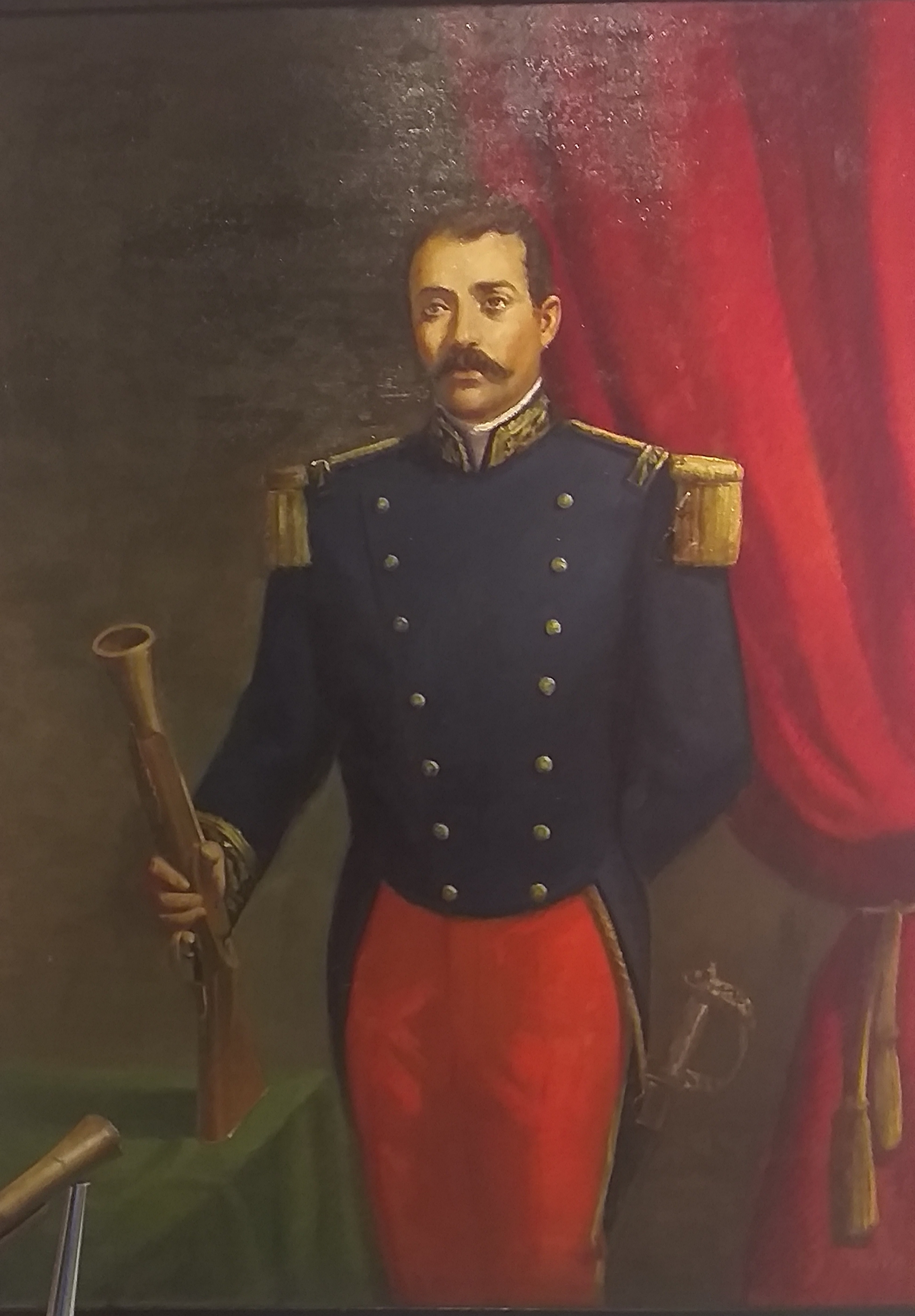
Matías Ramón Mella

At the beginning of 1843, a rebellion broke out in the south of Haiti that led to the overthrow of Boyer and opened a situation of instability taken advantage of by the conspirators of the secret society La Trinitaria, led by Juan Pablo Duarte. At that time, under the La Reforma regime, Bobadilla fell into disgrace for the first time as a result of being accused of being a collaborator of the deposed President Boyer. It cannot, however, be considered that he leaned towards Dominican independence out of resentment. In fact, knowing the environment of the time like no one else, he sensed that independence was going to occur and announced to his intimates that he had decided to accompany "the boys." The greatest effect of his separation from public positions must have been to facilitate his participation in conspiratorial activities. Until then, Bobadilla appeared as a collaborator of the Haitian regime, although it can be assumed that this position was the product of the conviction that there was no other alternative.

In subsequent years he issued virulent judgments about Haitian rule, which possibly reflected his true consideration and, therefore, led him to call for a breakup as soon as he saw it feasible. Its retrospective rejection was justified by cultural considerations that asserted a questionable substance of the Haitian people:

The distinctive character of Haitians is vain, proud, little inclined to work, friends of leisure and dissolution, without morals, without customs, without Religion, inclined to theft, lying, drunkenness and all the vices they can. constitute the degradation of a people, and almost no civil and political virtue can be pointed out to them. Practiced in murdering, plundering and devastating, their ambition is dominant and they have never been able to establish a solid government, having let the elements they had to constitute a State under the laws of reason and justice, known as the law of nations, disappear; so they have not been able to progress; They have always been in decline: they are enemies of foreigners, they do not allow them to marry in the country, acquire real estate […].

With his commitment, Bobadilla gave considerable impetus to the cause of the creation of the Dominican State in 1844, because many considered him as the prototype of the politician who was never wrong and reasoned that if he had oriented himself in that direction the event would end being produced.

This prestige allowed him to establish conspiratorial ties with important figures in Santo Domingo and nearby towns. Bobadilla's objective differed completely from that held by the Trinidadians, since he lacked faith in the possibility of the country achieving a defined status as an independent State. This conclusion was the product of the common sense that his experience provided him. For him it was inevitable that a power would take charge of Dominican affairs through annexation. The difference in positions between Bobadilla and the Trinitarios did not prevent them from trying to reach an agreement, for which a summit was held in the house of the two cannons, owned by Manuel Joaquín del Monte, another conservative lawyer who until then collaborated with the Haitians. The intransigence of both parties prevented agreements and the movement retreated after the repression deployed by President Charles Rivière-Hérard in mid-1843. As a result, Duarte had to leave the country, and Francisco del Rosario Sánchez remained at the head of the Trinitarios, maintaining the position that the objective It could not be other than absolute independence.

Although Bobadilla did not give up placing his hopes on the establishment of a protectorate of France, at one point he realized that it would not be feasible to overthrow Haitian rule without counting on the young liberals, the most active sector of those days. In the second half of 1843, he established ties with another leader, Matías Ramón Mella, who insisted on the need for an alliance of all those opposed to Haitian rule. Finally, Sánchez accepted this position and entered into negotiations with Bobadilla. Once the coup was planned on 27 February by a secret committee of Trinitarios, its members, led by Sánchez, decided to make an agreement with Bobadilla and other conservatives on the basis of recognizing that a fully independent State was going to be founded. Sánchez wrote the Manifesto of January 16, 1844, which stated the causes of the overthrow of Haitian rule and the policy that the Dominican Republic should follow. The sources agree that Bobadilla took part in the preparation of the text or he was its editor; The most credible thing is that he corrected and expanded it.

=== President of the Board ===
After the initial fighting, liberal Trinitarians and conservative Frenchifieds begun the organisation of the Dominican State on 1 March 1844; they established a cabinet called the "Central Gubernative Junta" and chose Bobadilla as president. He issued a decree that ensured that the new government will not act against the Haitians who reside in the territory and respect their properties. The content of the resolution is the following:

Instructed that the news is circulated in the public that due to the political change that has just taken place, the individuals of the Western Part who lived in it must leave this city, and those of French origin born in the former Spanish Part makes it known: “That according to established principles, the current Government is not in the intention of expelling any of those who are included in the previous category; that on the contrary, their persons and properties will be respected and that those from the Western Part who make known to the Board their determination to join our cause will be enabled to take an oath of fidelity before the municipal mayor, first obtaining an order to do so from this Board."

Another assurance was that slavery would forever be abolished in the Dominican state. This would be issued in the following decree:

Slavery has disappeared forever from the territory of the Dominican Republic, and that whoever spread this news will be considered a criminal, persecuted and punished if necessary.

=== Fall from power ===
In those days, urged by the imperative to prepare resistance against the Haitians, Sánchez did not give importance to the differences in objectives that separated them from the conservatives. It is explained that on 8 March the Junta sent a document to the French consul in which it requested the protection of that country in the event that Haitian troops entered; The proposal included the transfer of the Samaná peninsula, which was already beginning to be considered of strategic value. Between Bobadilla and Pedro Santana, designated head of the Southern Expeditionary Front, confidential ties were established aimed at obtaining the protection of France, since they agreed that the country did not have the military resources to confront the Haitian aggression. At the same time, Bobadilla established ties with the French consul Eustache Juchereau de Saint-Denys, who served as confidential advisor to the nascent State.

Although at the end of April, after the overthrow of Hérard, Haitian forces widthdrew from the nation, Bobadilla insisted that French protectorate be immediately obtained. To this end, he called a meeting of notables with the apparent purpose of reporting on the government's financial precariousness. Such a panorama allowed him to publicly state for the first time his position against the maintenance of independence. Duarte and other Trinitarios raised their protest immediately; A state of opinion was created that led to a coup d'état, the 18 Dominican Brumaire, on 9 June 1844, with the support of the people and troops of the city, through which the conservatives who had defended the French protection. Bobadilla had to hide and wait for the evolution of events.

A month later Santana entered the city, staged a counterattack and proceeded to reorganize the Junta, expelling the Trinitarios and banishing them "forever." The conservatives triumphed through this militaristic act and the leadership fell to Santana, so Bobadilla was no longer the leading figure on this side. In any case, he decided without hesitation to collaborate with Santana so that he could concentrate the greatest possible share of powers, in what he saw as a guarantee to maintain order in circumstances that he considered delicate. Bobadilla, certainly, aspired to a traditional institutionalized order, in which there was not a dictator, but the power of the ruling elite. But, immediately, he deemed it necessary to join the militarist reaction that ended in the establishment of the Santana dictatorship. For several months Bobadilla was Santana's closest advisor, as a member of the Board and later as Secretary of Justice, Public Instruction and Foreign Relations. Since then, the core of power was located in the cabinet, made up of Bobadilla, Manuel Cabral, Ricardo Miura and Manuel Jiménes. Among them, Bobadilla was the key figure, the man of ability and experience, the incarnation of reason of State, the symbol of continuity so dear to conservatives.

This function was highlighted during the deliberations to promulgate the constitution in the second half of 1844. The majority of the deputies, meeting in San Cristóbal in order to stay away from the influence of Santana, although they had conservative criteria, wanted a constitution that included an order of division of powers that guaranteed a rule of law. All of these precepts, coming from liberal theory, were reflected in the constitution, a copy of the one existing in the United States. Santana refused to accept the presidency under such conditions and argued that he needed to have extraordinary prerogatives as the only means of confronting the Haitian threat. Bobadilla, advised by Saint Denys, suggested the introduction of article 210, which conferred full powers on Santana in the event that he himself declared a state of emergency. The entire articles of the constitution were in fact unknown by article 210, which enshrined the dictatorship of a single individual.

== Exile and return ==
From 1844 to 1847, Bobadilla occupied important offices inside the State, such as President of Chamber of Deputies of the Dominican Republic in 1847. In the performance of his duties, after independence in 1844, Bobadilla ceased to be a simple bureaucrat: he rose to the height of a statesman endowed with the ability to perceive the content of problems and propose solutions in accordance with the circumstances. From that angle, he was probably the first political-intellectual figure of his time, with an outstanding capacity explained by his long performance in power. He was deeply involved in the Dominican environment and knew all the notable figures of his time; He was intimately familiar with the keys to the functioning of the State and penetrated the hidden secrets of the popular soul. In any case, his experience in holding positions as a lawyer, cultural gifts and professional expertise allowed him to be the highest level expositor of the country's problems during the period known as the First Republic, between 1844 and 1861.

Despite such prominence, Bobadilla began to have an ambiguous relationship within the Dominican State. On the one hand, as has been seen, his presence was almost irreplaceable as the figure with the greatest experience and capacity as a lawyer and jurist. At the same time, after 1846, he never achieved a level of power that would allow him to decisively influence the evolution of the political process. Rather, to the extent that he aspired to play a leading role, he suffered failures that led him to resign himself to performing subordinate functions and moving with extreme caution in the midst of the whirlwind of conflicting interests. In reality, this situation was universal among politicians and officials, since the weakness of the nascent State tended to concentrate powers in the figure of the Executive, who regulated the assignment of positions and perks. Bobadilla, who had conceived Article 210, was one of the first victims of this key resource of the autocratic Santana regime, although at no time was his life in danger.

From his preeminent position in the cabinet, Bobadilla advocated for an institutional framework that recognized the functions of the ministers, which included the ratification of the president's measures. Santana, on the contrary, sought to expand his dictatorial prerogatives, which led to a conflict between the two that led to Bobadilla's resignation from office in April 1846. The president had previously withdrawn his confidence in his powerful assistant. consequence of an anonymous pamphlet, in which the return of Church lands was demanded, and which was attributed to the priest José M. Bobadilla, brother of the cabinet member. Shortly afterwards, without the prior consent of Santana, Bobadilla was appointed member of the Tribunate, the name given to the lower house of Congress. Initially the dictator accepted the appointment, considering it advisable not to enter into an open dispute with his former mentor.

In 1847, Bobadilla was appointed president of the aforementioned body, a position from which he began to actively advocate for an effective separation of powers, which implied weakening Santana's powers and conferring true autonomy on the Legislative Branch. It was the exact opposite of what he had done in November 1844 with Article 210. He also questioned the reports of the Secretary of Finance, Ricardo Miura, which led Santana to demand his immediate dismissal. Bobadilla resisted, but the tyrant promoted a riot of "the people and the army" that broke into the session room and forced the tribune to request a license to go abroad, but not before giving a speech in which he praised himself as the true architect of the creation of the Dominican State. When he learned that some soldiers were threatening to kill him, he appeared at the House defiantly and armed with a revolver.

In June 1847, Bobadilla had to go into exile, his lifelong bete noire, after his bitter youth experience in Puerto Rico. The exile was so dramatic for him that on two occasions he sent letters to Santana, asking him to authorize him to return to the country, thereby implicitly proposing a reconciliation. At that moment the dictator did not deign to respond, probably because he still harbored resentment and feared that the presence of the "universal minister" could contribute to strengthening the intrigues of enemies and rivals. Santana's weak position was highlighted when he was forced to present his resignation in August 1848, being replaced by the Secretary of War, Manuel Jiménes, appointed in September 1848. As expected, Bobadilla immediately returned to the country, satisfied with the fall of Santana, and announced to the new president his willingness to support him.

But soon, Jiménes was deposed by a combination of military leaders and congressmen led by Buenaventura Báez, who considered that Santana's presence was essential. Although discreetly, Bobadilla once again placed himself at the command of the person who had banished him and shortly afterward he was appointed fiscal attorney of the Supreme Court of Justice, the main function within the judicial apparatus. Buenaventura Báez, appointed president days later, confirmed him in office. As was already characteristic of him and would continue to be from now on, he held other positions in the judicial apparatus, in addition to directing a public educational establishment and teaching civil law classes at the San Buenaventura school.

Equipped with extraordinary vigor, in addition to these functions he found time to practice the profession of lawyer and dedicate himself to the mahogany cutting business. He thus combined the exercise of high functions with independent personal support. But, as was common at the time, Bobadilla was not rich, but rather he achieved the necessary income to lead a comfortable life, in accordance with his social position and his public functions. He lived in the colonial town, had land, dressed elegantly, but lacked fortune. In his papers, published by historian Lugo Lovatón, it is observed that he had to make various transactions for the sale of stone houses within the walled perimeter of the city; and his will states that, at the end of his life, he only had one house, part of which he attributed to his wife's contribution to the marriage. It is true that he owned enormous tracts of land in Baní, Azua, Neiba and San Juan, which totaled more than 1,000 pesos in community titles; and although the effective value of these titles exceeded the nominal value, the low value of the land was evident. Consequently, until the end of his life Bobadilla had to maintain an arduous struggle to obtain the means of subsistence. This precariousness helps explain the clinging to high positions in the state apparatus. When he had to go into exile in 1847, he made it a condition that he be provided with means of transportation and a small initial help, since he lacked money to support himself abroad.

When Santana returned to power in 1853, Bobadilla was appointed member of the Conservative Council, the name then given to the upper house of the Legislative Branch. From this position he intervened in the constitutional debates, since he had to be part of the commission drafting the constitution of December 1854. In February of that year the congressmen had managed to approve a less authoritarian constitutional text, which eliminated article 210 and restored the division of powers. Santana objected to the change and pushed for the December constitutional review, which returned a rigid autocratic spirit. From now on, the constitution of December 1854 was considered the prototype of the authoritarian order, as it extreme the all-embracing powers of the president.

Ten years later, Bobadilla returned to play the role of November 1844, as standard bearer of a despotic order. He regained Santana's trust, although he never restored it within his inner circle. Judged essential, in any case, the lawyer continued to perform relevant functions within the State, in addition to that of president of the Senate. He refrained to avoid having a conflict with the hatero general again, thereby resigning himself to being inserted into a tyranny.

On the occasion of the Cibaeño Revolution, a new parenthesis was presented. Buenaventura Báez had returned to power in 1856 and Bobadilla tried not to come into conflict with the new order of things, despite his declared loyalty to Santana, who was arrested and deported. Until Báez's ascension, Bobadilla apparently tried unsuccessfully to get him to reconcile with Santana, perhaps thinking that this way he would not suffer reprisals. But as soon as the insurrection broke out in Santiago against the Báez government, on 7 July 1857, in protest of the government's financial management in the purchase of tobacco, Bobadilla was imprisoned on the pretext of complicity in the murder of a relative of Baez. He refused to release him for fear that he would join the besiegers of the city, so he spent about a year in the Ozama Fortress.

When Báez capitulated, Bobadilla received various commissions from the Santiago government chaired by José Desiderio Valverde. He was appointed senator of Santo Domingo and expressed his satisfaction with the order of things. History continued to repeat itself: Bobadilla was willing to adapt to the existing situation, while those who controlled it were forced to rely on his services, whether in recognition of his capacity or to prevent him from joining the enemy side. But, in the same way, when things changed he showed a conjurer's ability to join the group of winners. In accordance with this procedure, Bobadilla immediately sympathized with Santana when he disowned the government of Santiago and the Constitution of Moca. Once again, the lawyer's rhetorical skills and legal capacity were put at the service of despotism and he wrote a memorial justifying Santana's coup d'état.

In the text he argued that the seat of government in Santiago altered a natural order, that the territorial division established by the Moca constitution would cause confrontations between the regions and that, overall, that constitution was biased by a mistaken attempt to innovate. He simply ratified his conservative worldview to legitimize the replacement of the constitution of December 1854. This did not prevent him from reiterating, undaunted, modern democratic principles, while recognizing that Santana was a "benign" dictator. He proclaimed that the constitution was perfectly democratic, despite having abolished the provincial deputations and other components of the liberal spirit that the two previous constitutions had. Santana's presence and the resulting authoritarian dose, according to Bobadilla, were necessary to confront Báez, whom he accused of being a reckless attacker of the state coffers.

As a reward for his services, in his last government Santana had him appointed president of the Consulting Senate. As on previous occasions, Bobadilla began to actively intervene in the elucidation of the country's central problems, although without being a key piece of the power racket. He had already shown signs of dealing with issues such as promoting immigration, the functioning of the courts, the rationalization of the tax system and the regulation of common lands. He developed the thesis that the condition of progress presupposed, first and foremost, differentiation from the Haitian legacy, a country of "infernal" politics. It meant opening up to foreign trade as a basic means of accessing the factors of prosperity that Dominicans lacked and that, by necessity, had to be found among foreigners.

Consequently, he accepted Santana's decision to incorporate the country into Spain in March 1861, but he was not co-responsible for that step nor did he show enthusiasm for it. As Rufino Martínez highlights, following his cautious attitude of calculation, he considered that, once decided, the measure would be carried out and he was obliged to accept it because it coincided with his convictions about the impossibility of the Dominican people forging a stable independent order. and fruitful.

He served as Chairman of the Supreme Court of Justice, from 3 June 1851, until 17 January 1853; afterwards, from 1853 until 1859, period of the governments of Rule Mota, Desiderio Valverde, Buenaventura Báez and Pedro Santana, he held important offices. He was the president of the Senate of the Dominican Republic in 1854.

During the re-annexation era to Spain (1861–1865), Bobadilla was designated Magistrate of the Royal Audience of Santo Domingo.

== Later years ==
Consequently, he accepted Santana's decision to incorporate the country into Spain in March 1861, but he was not co-responsible for that step nor did he show enthusiasm for it. As Rufino Martínez highlights, following his cautious attitude of calculation, he considered that, once decided, the measure would be carried out and he was obliged to accept it because it coincided with his convictions about the impossibility of the Dominican people forging a stable independent order and fruitful.

During the annexation to Spain, the "universal minister" was confirmed ipso facto in high positions in the state apparatus. A few days after the event occurred, he was appointed member of a commission in charge of resolving the monetary issue, which constituted one of the most serious problems that afflicted the country. Months later he was appointed judge of the Royal Court, one of the few positions of true responsibility assigned by the new dominators to Dominicans. As a sign of trust, he received additional tasks, such as translating the codes from French and making them compatible with the reality of the country. He was confirmed in the profession of lawyer and received honorary distinctions, including the proposal of a title of nobility.

=== During the Dominican Restoration War ===
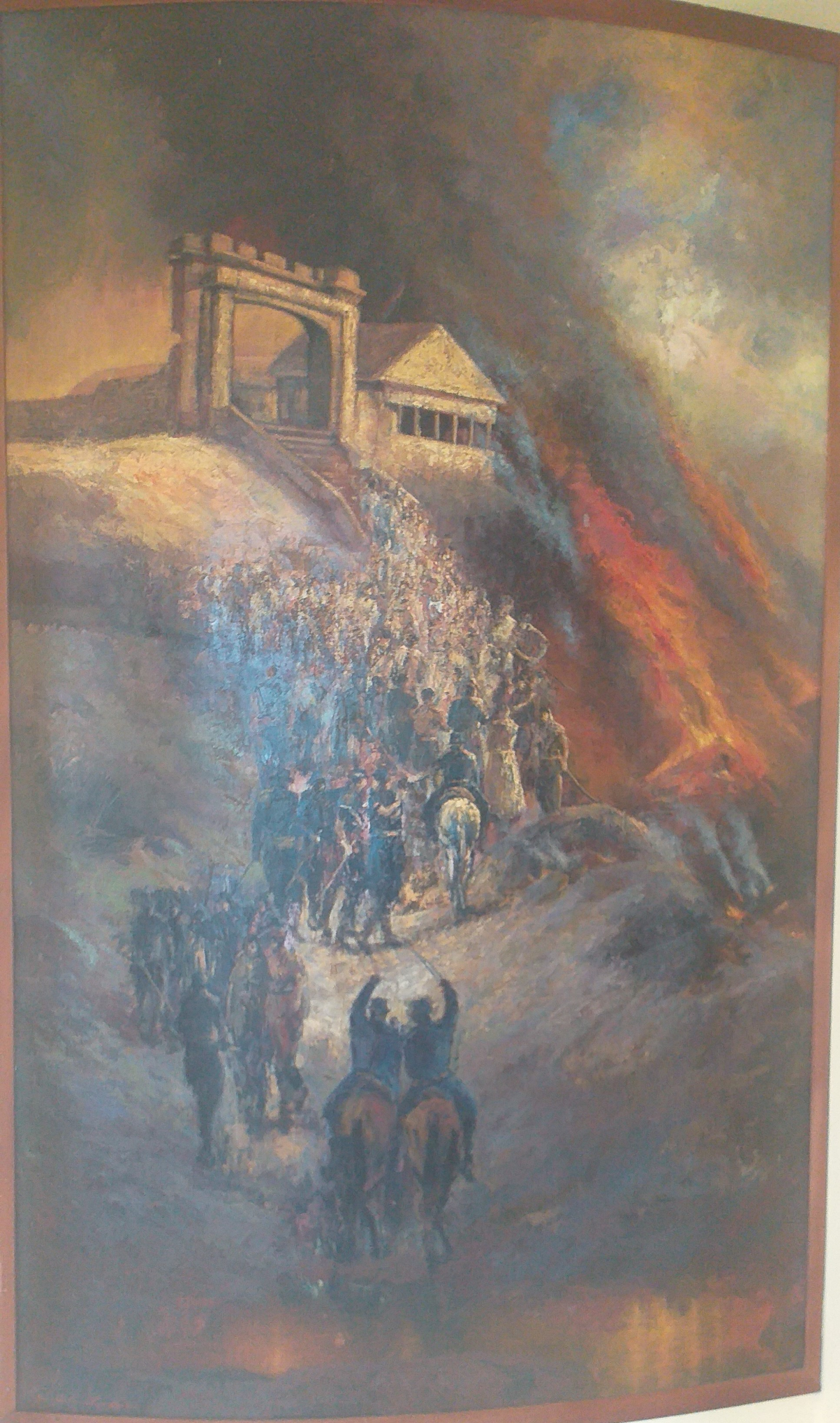
Illustration of the Siege of San Luis Fortress in the Dominican Restoration War.

When the Dominican Restoration War broke out, he remained unwavering in his support for Spanish domination, which can be inferred from his correspondence with people he trusted, with whom he had no need to pretend. In these letters he shows satisfaction with the successes that the Spanish troops sometimes achieved against the Dominican patriots. Bobadilla simply described the insurgents as bandits, and reduced their leaders to the status of predators, murderers and rioters incapable of political action. When the unstoppable advance of the rebels became evident, for the first time the old man expressed a pessimistic stance about the future of the country. It was not only that everything had been left in ruins, but that he could not conceive of the possibility that these rustic guerrilla leaders, in his crudely illiterate eyes, could govern the destinies of the country. Such consideration led him to maintain until the last minute the hope that accidents could occur that would end up tipping the balance in favor of Spain. The national triumph represented for him, in those days, the relapse into barbarism. He clung to the convictions of the lawyer attached to power to the last consequences, especially when his certainties about the desirable regime under direct foreign tutelage were at stake. Spain was the current power and considered it equipped to ensure a relationship that would provide the country with stability and progress; Furthermore, it was the original nation of the Dominican people, with a community of language, race and religion, the components of identity.

Not even when he saw everything lost and that even his son Tomás joined the restorers, after the disaster of the Battle of La Canela, did his annexationist principles falter. And yet, when the time came when he considered leaving the country, he preferred to stay and face any risk that might come from that group of robbers, arsonists and murderers that he claimed were the restaurateurs. He therefore declined the offer made to him by the Spanish to be confirmed in the position of oidor in Cuba or Puerto Rico. In the end, their attachment to the land prevailed, whether out of petty calculations of convenience, fear of the vicissitudes of emigration or out of rapport with the Dominican lifestyle.

=== Post-Restoration War ===
He collaborated with the Cabral regime and with the third period of Báez established at the end of 1865, which sought to gain the trust of everyone, especially the restaurateurs. However, shortly after, Báez's centralist tendency caused a break with Cabral, who announced an insurrection from Haiti, immediately supported by Pedro Antonio Pimentel, another leading man of the Restoration, who held the Interior and Police portfolio. As was required, Bobadilla agreed to collaborate with the new rulers, but he did not do so out of simple opportunism, but above all because the conflicts that pitted Santana's former supporters against Buenaventura Báez had not disappeared. Since 1866, at the end of Báez's third government, politics was polarized between his followers, already known as reds, and those of the liberal side, coming from the main generals of the Restoration, who shortly after became known as blues.

Although many conservatives who had been followers of Santana took sides in favor of Báez, at the time it was concluded that, as a political tendency, Santanism had experienced a metamorphosis in the conditions created after the departure of the Spaniards and that, To stay in power, he had joined the liberal current. This behavior of a considerable part of the Santanistas is explained because they gave priority to their conflict with Buenaventura Báez. The enmity between Baecistas and Santanistas became so terrible that, with Santana gone, his followers could prefer anything as long as their inveterate enemy did not reign. Bobadilla was perhaps the main architect of this symbiosis between the old Santanista conservatives and the new restorative liberals, despite the fact that both parties had waged a two-year war.

But the nature of the current society encouraged unexpected alliances, which ended up being seen naturally. It didn't matter that thousands had died and that the ashes of the fields were still smoking; Only the imperatives of the struggle for power counted. For the restaurateurs it became clear that Báez constituted a formidable threat to their preponderance, so that they felt obliged to forge alliances with all those who rejected the only one who then had the status of popular leader.

To his surprise, the triumphant restaurateurs, far from arresting him or shooting him as a traitor, immediately asked him to provide his services to the Dominican Republic. History continued to repeat itself: Bobadilla was requested, as a matter of course, in recognition of his political skills, seen as necessary for the success of a government administration; and, as on previous occasions, he bowed to the demand, also as a natural thing and as an inevitable destiny.

Since 1866, at the end of Báez's third government, politics was polarized between his followers, already known as reds, and those of the liberal side, coming from the main generals of the Restoration, who shortly after became known as blues. Although many conservatives who had been followers of Santana took sides in favor of Báez, at the time it was concluded that, as a political tendency, Santanaism had experienced a metamorphosis in the conditions created after the departure of the Spaniards and that, To stay in power, he had joined the liberal current. This behavior of a considerable part of the Santanistas is explained because they gave priority to their conflict with Buenaventura Báez. The enmity between Baecistas and Santanistas became so terrible that, with Santana gone, his followers could prefer anything as long as their inveterate enemy did not reign.

Bobadilla was perhaps the main architect of this symbiosis between the old Santanista conservatives and the new restorative liberals, despite the fact that both parties had waged a two-year war. But the nature of the current society encouraged unexpected alliances, which ended up being seen naturally. It didn't matter that thousands had died and that the ashes of the fields were still smoking; Only the imperatives of the struggle for power counted. For the restaurateurs it became clear that Báez constituted a formidable threat to their preponderance, so that they felt obliged to forge alliances with all those who rejected the only one who then had the status of popular leader.

It is clear that the liberals – who formed a phantom entity they called the National Party – initially constituted a different group from the former Santanistas and that they turned to them compelled by adverse circumstances. The majority of conservatives did not have a sectarian doctrinal vocation and the liberal movement was too recent, so collaboration between both parties in the Blue Party became feasible. For this reason, one of the guidelines of the two governments of José María Cabral was to incorporate the old Santanistas. As would be recurrent in successive experiences, Dominican liberals could ally themselves with conservatives while adopting many of their criteria and behaviors.

=== Cabral's Fall from power ===
But in such alliances not only the concepts of the liberals were modified but also those of the conservatives involved, and Bobadilla would have to play one of the relevant functions so that the Santanistas ended up being blue and, consequently, accepted doctrinal principles of liberalism, in especially the defense of absolute independence. During the last years of his life, without renouncing previous actions, the lawyer evolved towards national positions, departing from his eternal annexationist certainties. Surely, based on analyzing what happened during the Restoration, he came to the conclusion that the Dominican people had achieved a status that allowed them to sustain an independent State. It does not seem that he took this radical turn motivated by the contrast with Báez, although such an element was not without its origin. This change with respect to his previous career values his political talent, his understanding of the life of the country and his commitment to what he understood should be the valid expectations of the Dominican community.

In January 1868, when Cabral was overthrown by a wave of leaders who dragged the peasants with the cry of "long live Báez", Bobadilla chose to emigrate. The animosity between the reds and the blues was unprecedented, and at that time the differences were settled with executions, especially by the reds, animated by a furious spirit of revenge.

=== Annexation project to the United States ===
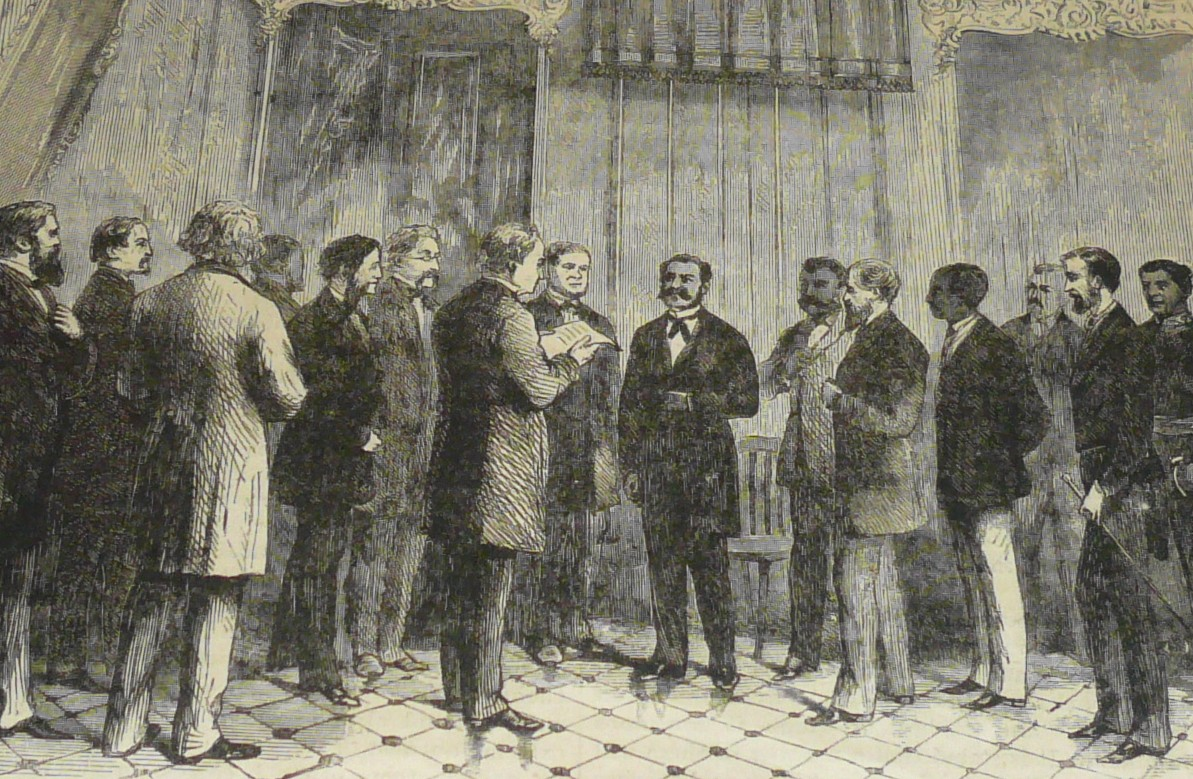
Buenaventura Báez conversing with American officials for an annexation project.

During his final exile, Bobadilla set the goal of putting his talent and experience at the service of the cause of the nationalist liberals. This did not prevent him from trying to return to the country, as he found the condition of emigration unbearable, a request that was denied by Báez, motivated by resentment towards all those who had been his enemies. Bobadilla's change of positions regarding the national problem was evident with the project to annex the Dominican Republic to the United States, preliminarily agreed upon at the end of 1869. He emerged as one of the champions of the national cause and promoted a manifesto of the Dominican residents of Puerto Rico in rejection of the annexationist project of the Six Years regime.

After a moment of hesitation, he decided to fully commit himself again to the cause of the blues, in order to prevent the annexation project from materializing. He became involved in the negotiations between the leaders of the Blue Party, trying to favor the primacy of Cabral, whom he considered more gifted and with the necessary conditions to command the national war. He put his intellect at the service of independence in the drafting of documents such as the one sent to United States Senator Charles Sumner, who led the opposition to annexation in Washington's leading circles. In the letter to Sumner, Bobadilla affirms that the annexation to Spain could have been justified because it had been the metropolis of the Dominicans for more than three centuries, so they were united to it by that historical bond and factors derived from it, such as language and race. He reasoned that the Dominican mentality could not correspond to the current way of life in the United States and noted that, although the northern power had shown its civilizing fertility, the presence of the Dominicans in it would constitute a foreign body, an inconvenient situation for both Americans and Dominicans:

I know the Dominican people very well. Always abandoned to his own forces, he has always fought for his freedom, and his efforts have always been crowned by the desired success. May for a moment be dominated by strangers, because the surprise of the act that changes your political condition, overwhelms your means of resistance and action; But after that first moment of stupor, he will rise as one man, obeying a single thought, to oppose whoever tries to take away his freedom, his independence. Accustomed for more than fifty years to governing himself, to living the life of the camps, to spending days, months and years with weapons in his hands, lacking everything, defying hunger and inclemency; accustomed to living free, owing his freedom only to his own effort, he does not resist strange domination, he shakes it, he engages in the fight against the dominator, and even with the awareness of his weakness, he sustains it; He magnifies it with his desperation, and in his desire to be free, he makes it long, horrible and bloody.

=== Exile to Haiti, last activities and death ===
Endowed with the will to contribute to the advancement of the war waged by the blues in the southern border area, at the beginning of 1871 Bobadilla decided to move to Haiti in order to put his experience at the service of the insurgent leaders. He showed signs of implacable will, since he was almost 85 years old and was suffering from illnesses that had diminished his well-known vigor. He lived first in Cap-Haïtien, in the midst of tremendous material difficulties, where he tried to collaborate with General Pimentel. But he judged that his political role compelled him to move to Port-au-Prince, in order to influence the Haitian ruling circles to provide resolute support for the Dominican cause. His son Tomás, also exiled in Haiti, who carried out commercial activities, wanted to help him, but was unable to do so in a meaningful way as he found himself on the verge of bankruptcy. During these patriotic activities his health experienced a rapid deterioration, not unrelated to the harsh conditions of exile. He died in the Haitian capital on 21 December 1871. He received state honors in Port-au-Prince for his services to the two countries of the island.

== See also ==
- España Boba
- Republic of Spanish Haiti
- Haitian occupation of Santo Domingo
- First Dominican Republic
- Pedro Santana
- Buenaventura Báez
- José Núñez de Cáceres
- Juan Pablo Duarte

== Bibliography ==
- García, José G. Compendio de la historia de Santo Domingo. 4 vols. Santo Domingo, 1968.
- García Lluberes, Alcides. Duarte y otros temas. Santo Domingo, 1971.
- Lugo Lovatón, Ramón. Tomás Bobadilla y Briones, Boletín del Archivo General de la Nación. Vol. XIII (1950), pp. 142–166, 273–330, 406–447; vol. XIV (1951), pp. 9–72, 175–228, 291346.
- Martínez, Rufino. Diccionario biográfico-histórico dominicano (1821-1930). Santo Domingo, 1997.
- Morillas, José María. Siete biografías dominicanas. Ciudad Trujillo, 1944.
- Rodríguez Demorizi, Emilio (ed.). Discursos de Bobadilla. Ciudad Trujillo, 1938.
- Rodríguez Demorizi, Emilio (ed.). Discursos históricos y literarios. Ciudad Trujillo, 1947.

Political offices
Preceded by Francisco del Rosario Sánchez	President of the Dominican Republic; 1844–1844	Succeeded by Francisco del Rosario Sánchez
