= Battle of Jura =

1863 battle of the Dominican Restoration War

- Part of the Dominican Restoration War
- Azua Province
| Date | October 1, 1863 |
| Location | Jura River, Azua Province, Dominican Republic |
| Result | Tactical Spanish victory |
| Territorial changes | Dominican forces take over Azua |

Belligerents
| Kingdom of Spain | Dominican Republic |

Commanders and leaders
| (Spain) Eusebio Puello | (Dominican Republic) José Durán (Dominican Republic) Manuel Chanlatte |

Strength
| Unknown | 1,000 soldiers 2 artillery pieces |

Casualties and losses
| Unknown | 2 artillery pieces captured |

The Battle of Jura (Spanish: Batalla de Jura) was a major battle of the Dominican Restoration War that took place on October 1, 1863, between Spanish forces commanded by Eusebio Puello and Dominican forces under the command of General José Durán. Despite the Spanish victory, Governor Felipe Rivero ordered that Azua be evacuated due to an uprising at San Cristóbal.

== Battle ==
On October 1, 1863, more than 1,000 Dominican rebels attacked and marched towards Azua with 2 pieces of artillery, but General Eusebio Puello met them and finding them on the other side of the Jura River, a league and a half from that point, although with fewer forces (partly with soldiers sent from Puerto Plata by Lieutenant General José de la Gándara), he managed to repel General Durán's troops, and managed to seize the 2 pieces of artillery guarded by Manuel Chanlatte, all the ammunition and several prisoners.

== Aftermath ==
=== Reconcentration of Spanish forces, evacuation and siege of Azua ===
On October 6, the insurgents took Baní and the next day San Cristóbal revolted. Due to this, Lieutenant General Felipe Rivero y Lemoine ordered General Puello to evacuate Azua, also reporting an independence conspiracy in the city of Santo Domingo. Like General Puello, Lieutenant General José de la Gándara and the Marquis of Las Carreras, Lieutenant General Pedro Santana were summoned to Santo Domingo. On October 9, 1863, Spanish troops and loyalist families evacuated from Azua in three ships to Santo Domingo. That same day, Azua was captured by General Pedro Florentino.

Eusebio Puello would later be promoted to the rank of Field marshal of the Spanish Army for his performance in the battle, and Lieutenant General Rivero awarded him the Grand Cross of the Order of Isabella the Catholic for his merits on the Jura River and his operations in Baní.

== See also ==
- Eusebio Puello
- Pedro Florentino
