= Gabino Puello =

Dominican soldier and activist (1816–1847)

Gabino Puello de Castro (1816 – December 23, 1847) was a Dominican soldier and a leader in the Dominican War of Independence. He was one of the signers of the Manifesto of January 16, 1844. After some hostilities with the conservative cabinet, he was accused of taking part in a conspiracy against Pedro Santana, who subjected him, as well as his brother, José Joaquín Puello, to persecution and subsequent execution in December 1847.

== Biography ==
He was born in 1816 to free Afro-Dominican parents, Martín Joaquín Puello and María Merced de Castro. The circumstances surrounding his birth remains unknown, but it is believed by historians that he was born in nearby Puerto Rico. From a very young age he learned music.

During the years of the Unification of Hispaniola, a decree issued by the then governor of the island, Jérôme-Maximilien Borgella, enforced mandatory military service of young Dominicans of fighting age. As such, once he became of age, he enlisted in the Haitian Army. He reached the rank of sergeant major of the 31st Regiment.

Together with his brothers, José Joaquín and Eusebio they became interested in the separatist movement led by Juan Pablo Duarte, who had founded the secret society La Trinitaria in 1838.

Puello was entrusted to travel to the southern region of the island in order to publicize the Dominican Act of Independence, of January 16, 1844. He was denounced by anti-independence sectors and was issued an arrest warrant by Haitian authorities. He evaded capture and continued to support the independence cause.

Later, he participated in repelling the invading Haitian army during the Dominican War of Independence. He was said to have fought in the bloody battles in Comendador, a border town that is the province of present-day Elías Piña.

He was Commander of Arms of Samaná for some time, while in those functions he was accused along with his brother José Joaquín Puello of complicity in a conspiracy against the government. Unfortunately, both of them were tried and sentenced to death. On December 23, 1847, both brothers, along with some other relatives, were executed in the city of Santo Domingo on the orders of President Pedro Santana. He was 31 years old.

In 1916, his remains were exhumed and finally exalted in the National Pantheon, where he is buried alongside other prominent figures of the Dominican Republic.

== Personal life ==
He left behind 4 children with several different women: with Salomé Eraso he had daughters Agustina and Amelia; with Juana Rivera he had son named Félix; and with Ana Ortega he had daughter named Francisca.

== See also ==
- José Joaquín Puello
- Eusebio Puello
- Juan Pablo Duarte

== Bibliography ==
- Garrido, Víctor (1974). Los Puello (PDF) (in Spanish) (ii ed.). Santo Domingo: Secretaría de Estado de Educación, Bellas Artes y Cultos. Archived from the original (PDF) on 2015-06-23.
