= Galvão (surname) =

Galvão/Galvao is a Portuguese surname derived from Latin Galbanus and Galba.

Notable people with this surname include:

== Sportspeople ==
- André Galvão (born 1982), Brazilian mixed martial artist
- André Galvão (futsal player) (born 1992), Portuguese futsal player
- Antonio Dino Galvão (1901–????), Brazilian footballer
- Diego Benedito Galvão Máximo (born 1986), Brazilian footballer
- Diogo Galvão (born 1982), Brazilian footballer
- Douglas Galvão Silva (born 1986), Brazilian footballer
- José Antônio Martins Galvão (born 1982), Brazilian footballer
- Lucas Galvão (born 1991), Brazilian footballer
- Marcos Galvão (born 1981), Brazilian mixed martial artist
- Mário Galvão (1916–?), Portuguese footballer
- Martim Galvão (born 1995), Portuguese footballer
- Mauricio Galvao (1890–1945), German field hockey player
- Mauro Galvão (born 1961), Brazilian footballer and manager
- Pedro Galvão (born 1934), Argentine swimmer
- Pedro Galvão (footballer) (born 1984), Portuguese footballer
- Raulino Galvao (1888–?), German hockey player
- Rodrigo Andreis Galvão (born 1978), Brazilian footballer
- Tiago Galvão da Silva (born 1989), Brazilian footballer
- Vinicius Galvão Leal (born 1989), Brazilian footballer
- Washington Galvão Júnior (born 1989), Brazilian footballer

== Other fields ==
- António Galvão (c. 1490–1557), Portuguese soldier and historian
- Cândido da Fonseca Galvão (1845–1890), Brazilian military officer
- Carlos Galvão de Melo (1921–2008), Portuguese military officer
- Duarte Galvão (c. 1435–1440 – 1517), Portuguese diplomat
- Eduardo Galvão (1962–2020), Brazilian actor
- Filipe Galvão, known as Fiuk (born 1990), Brazilian actor and singer
- Flávio Galvão (born 1949), Brazilian actor
- Frei Galvão (1739–1822), Brazilian Franciscan friar and saint
- Henrique Galvão (1895–1970), Portuguese politician and writer
- Lula Galvão (born 1962), Brazilian musician
- Marcos Galvão (diplomat) (born 1959), Brazilian diplomat
- Patrícia Rehder Galvão, known as Pagu (1910–1962), Brazilian writer
- Paulo Galvão (born 1967), Portuguese musician
- Ricardo Galvão (born 1947), Brazilian physicist and engineer
- Sofia Galvão (born 1963), Portuguese lawyer and politician

== See also ==
- Galvan (Spanish) and Galvano and Galvani (Italian)
- Estádio Conselheiro Galvão
