= Battle of La Canela =

1864 battle of the Dominican Restoration War

- Part of the Dominican Restoration War
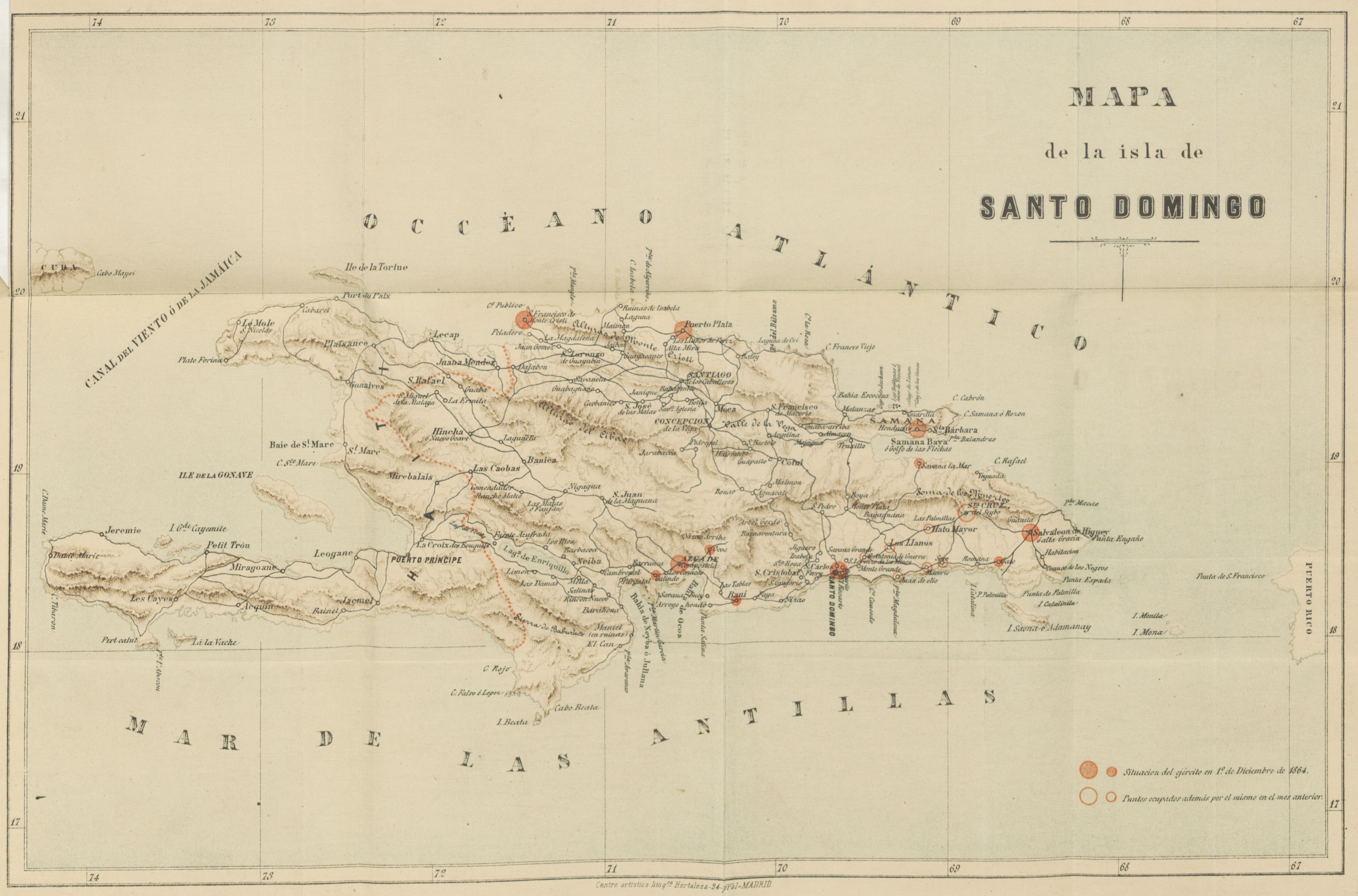
- Towns under Spanish control
Date	December 4, 1864
Location	Present-day Galván, Dominican Republic
Result	Dominican victory
Territorial changes	Insurgents occupy Neiba

Belligerents
Dominican Republic	Kingdom of Spain

Commanders and leaders
(Dominican Republic) José María Cabral (Dominican Republic) Francisco Gregorio Billini	(Spain) Eusebio Puello

Strength
600	111

Casualties and losses
1 killed 4 wounded	72 killed 11 prisoners

The Battle of La Canela (Spanish: Batalla de la Canela) was one of the last battles of the Dominican Restoration War. It took place on December 4, 1864, near La Canela (now Galván). A force of 600 Dominican troops under General José María Cabral, positioned on higher ground, engaged a Spanish convoy of 80 Spaniards and 31 local troops in open-field combat. The Spanish suffered heavy casualties, leaving 72 dead, 11 prisoners, numerous weapons and munitions, and 40 mules, while Dominican losses were only one killed.

== See also ==
- Spanish annexation of the Dominican Republic
