= Galgano =

Galgano or Galganus may refer to:

- Frank R. Galgano (1887–1942), American lawyer and politician
- Galgano Guidotti (1148–1181), or Saint Galgano, Catholic saint from Tuscany
- Galgano Perpignani (1694–1770), Italian painter
- Galgano, an alternate name for Gawain

== See also ==
- Galbanus
- Galvanus (disambiguation)
