= Victoria Galvan =

American singer

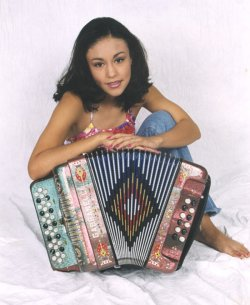

Background information
- Born: July 18, 1986 (age 40)
- Instruments: Accordion

Victoria Galvan (born 1986) is a singer and musician from Corpus Christi, Texas, US. She performs in the Tejano style as part of the ensemble Victoria Sus Chikos (Victoria and Her Boys). She records on the Hacienda Records label.

Galvan is one of the few female Tejano vocalists to play the accordion herself as well as being the lead vocalist. She prefers and plays a Gabbanelli accordion. Victoria y Sus Chikos performed at the Tejano Conjunto Festival in San Antonio, Texas, in May 2000. She was featured in the 2001 documentary film Accordion Dreams, directed by Hector Galán, which explored the history of Tejano music.

Galvan received the Female Rising Star of the Year award at the Tejano Music Industry Awards in 2002. Since then, she has released her third studio album, Cada Día Que Pasa. In April 2003, Victoria was a panelist on the subject "The Current Generation of Musica Tejana", at the Annual Conference of the Center for Mexican American Studies at the University of Houston.

== Discography ==
All records are credited to Victoria y Sus Chikos, and released by Hacienda Records:

- Preparate (2000)
- Que Rico (2001)
- Cada Día Que Pasa (2003)
