= Sofia Galvão =

Portuguese lawyer and politician

- Born: Sofia de Sequeira Galvão; 6 April 1963; Lisbon, Portugal
- Occupation(s): Lawyer and politician
- Website: http://sofiagalvao.pt/

Sofia Galvão (born 1963) is a Portuguese lawyer specialising in real estate and planning matters. She is a prominent member of the Portuguese liberal-conservative Social Democratic Party, having been a vice-president, and has also served two terms as a Secretary of State in the Portuguese government.

== Early life ==
Sofia de Sequeira Galvão was born in the Portuguese capital of Lisbon on 6 April 1963. At the age of 20, she became general secretary of the Association of Real Estate Developers, a position she kept until 1995, and which was a major factor in her choice of university studies. After graduating in law at the Faculty of Law of the University of Lisbon in 1988, Galvão remained at the university until 2003 as a teacher of urban planning law, obtaining a master's degree in legal sciences in 1995, while also working for a law firm. During her period at the University of Lisbon she authored a book entitled Introdução ao Estudo do Direito (Introduction to the Study of Law), together with Marcelo Rebelo de Sousa, who became the president of Portugal in 2016.

== Political career ==
A member of the Social Democratic Party (PSD), Galvão is considered to be close to Rebelo de Sousa. She was a member of the Municipal Assembly of Oeiras, to the west of Lisbon, and served in the XVI Constitutional Government (2004–05) under Pedro Santana Lopes as Secretary of State for Public Administration. She later became Secretary of State for the Presidency of the Council of Ministers. In 2008 she became vice-president of the PSD National Political Commission (2008-2010). In 2016, the then leader of the PSD, Pedro Passos Coelho invited her to be a vice-president of the PSD, a position she held until 2018.

== Legal activities ==
After having worked for three law companies, Galvão decided to set up Sofia Galvão Advogados, which describes itself as a "boutique" law firm and specialises in activities relating to real estate, new construction, urban rehabilitation and tourist development, as well as maritime developments. In addition to maintaining close contact with the University of Lisbon, she has been a visiting lecturer at the NOVA University Lisbon and has taught a course at the Catholic University of Portugal. She has been president of the Board of AD URBEM - Association for the Development of Urban Planning and Construction Law. At the request of the Minister of Finance, she was a member of a commission on the reform of the taxation of land.

In 2009 Galvão was a regular writer for the Expresso newspaper. More recently, she has written for the Observador newspaper, including an article in 2020 on euthanasia, which was under discussion in Portugal at the time.
