= William H. Galvani =

Russian-American civil engineer, vegetarianism activist, and writer (1861–1947)

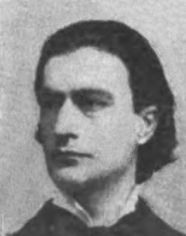
- Born: June 27, 1861; Russia
- Died: October 23, 1947 (aged 86); Portland, Oregon, U.S.
- Occupation(s): Civil engineer, writer, activist

William H. Galvani (June 27, 1861 – October 23, 1947) was a Russian-American civil engineer, vegetarianism activist and writer.

== Biography ==
Galvani was born in Russia and emigrated to the United States in 1882. He worked as a railway engineer under Hans Thielsen, chief engineer of the Oregon Railway & Navigation Company. Throughout his career in engineering, he worked for the Oregon Electric Railway Company and the Pacific Power & Light Company. He worked as a civil engineer on principal railways in the Pacific Northwest. He was also a writer and contributed to periodical literature.

In 1909, Galvani was appointed by Governor Benson to represent Oregon at the National Peace Congress in Chicago. Galvani was Jewish but held an interest in Buddhism and published several articles in Buddhist magazines. He was an exponent of pantheism and a member of the Theosophical Society. Galvani was an anti-vivisectionist and strict vegetarian. He planned to create a vegetarian colony at his farm in Oregon. He was President of the Oregon Vegetarian Society. In 1943, he was granted an honorary doctorate of engineering by Oregon State College. He was a 32nd-degree Mason of the Scottish Rite.

== Map collection ==
Galvani was a collector of rare books and maps. In 1947, he bequeathed his private library, including his map collection to the Oregon State College. The collection includes over 1,050 maps.

== Selected publications ==
- Vegetarianism (Twentieth Century, 1891)
- Meat and Murder (Good Health, 1893)
- The Early Explorations and the Origin of the Name of the Oregon Country (The Quarterly of the Oregon Historical Society, 1920)
- Recollections of J. F. Stevens and Senator Mitchell (Oregon Historical Quarterly, 1943)
