= Jorge Galván =

Mexican writer and engineer

Jorge Galvan
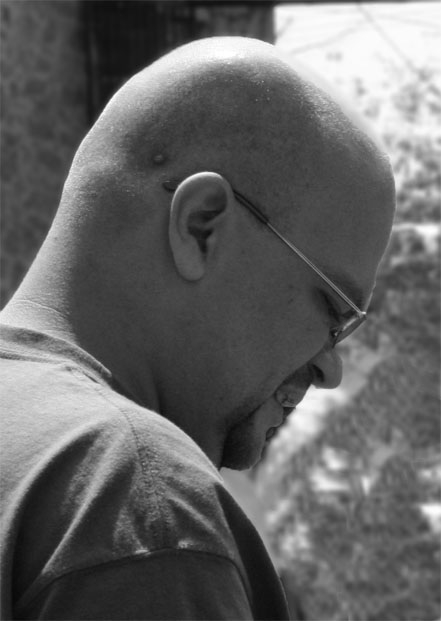
- Photograph taken in 2007
- Born: April 1966 (age 60); Mexico City, Mexico
- Occupations: Writer, engineer

Jorge Galván (born April 1966 in Mexico City) is a Mexican writer and engineer. He is best known for his historical novel "El Hierro y la Pólvora" (Iron and Gunpowder), for which he was awarded the First Novel UNAM – Alfaguara Prize in 2006

Galvan graduated as electronics engineer at the Universidad Autónoma Metropolitana (Mexico City), and currently lives in the City of Naucalpan (Mexico State).

== Works ==
El Hierro y la Pólvora (Iron and Gunpowder) published in 2006 by Alfaguara.
