= Italian ship Luigi Galvani =

Luigi Galvani or simply Galvani was the name of at least two ships of the Italian Navy named in honour of Luigi Galvani and may refer to:

- Italian submarine Luigi Galvani, a Micca-class submarine launched in 1918 and discarded in 1938.
- Italian submarine Galvani, a Brin-class submarine launched in 1938 and sunk in 1940.
