= Galvan (fashion brand) =

British fashion label

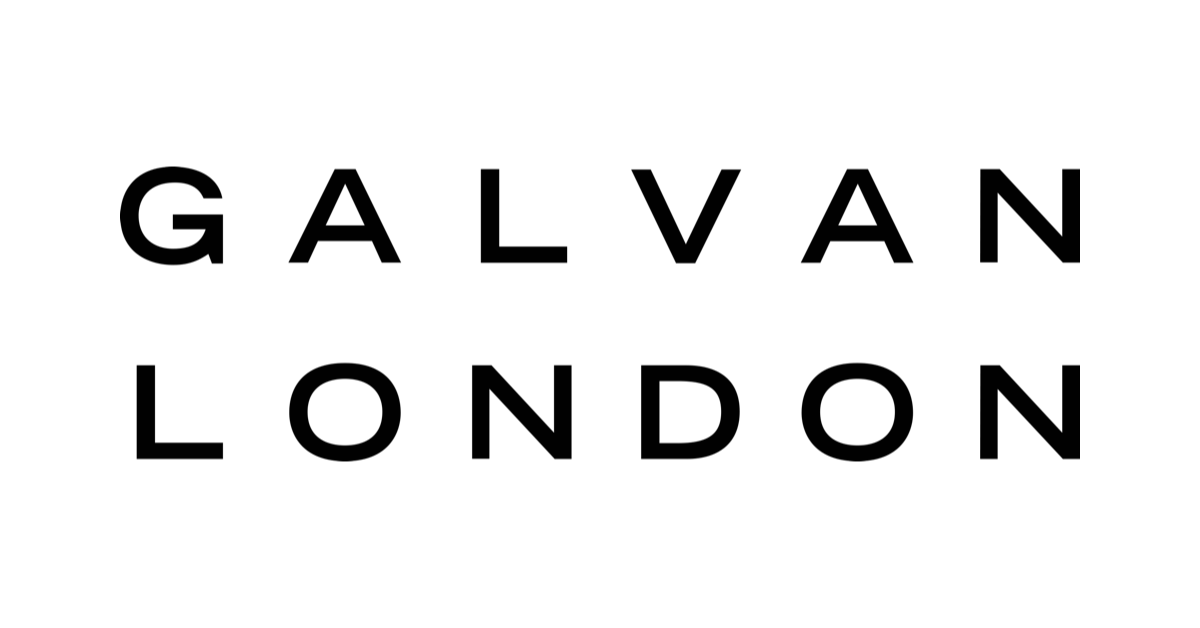
Logo of Galvan (fashion brand)

Galvan London is a British fashion brand designed by four women.

== History ==
German designer Anna-Christin Haas; American businesswoman Katherine Holmgren (who is CEO); Icelandic former model Sólveig "Sola" Harrison (who is creative director); and Swiss businesswoman Carolyn Hodler (who is sales director), established the Galvan brand together in 2014, after frustration with not being able to find the right wedding or event attire for young women below the unattainable high fashion price ranges. Although none of them are of British nationality, they decided to base the operations in London, England whilst working virtually. The textiles of their pieces come from Italy and France, and their showroom is in Düsseldorf, Germany. Galvan is primarily sold at Bergdorf Goodman and Neiman Marcus in brick-and-mortar retail.

== In popular culture ==
Galvan has been worn by celebrities on the red carpet, including actress Sophie Turner at the 88th Academy Awards. Actresses including Gwyneth Paltrow, Jennifer Lawrence, and Selena Gomez have worn outfits. German model Heidi Klum wore a Galvan "Pandora" gown, which is considered the brand's signature style, on her wedding day.
