= Galván, Dominican Republic =

Coordinates: 18°30′14″N 71°20′24″W

- Interactive map of Galván, Dominican Republic
- Country: Dominican Republic
- Province: Baoruco

Area
  - Total: 214.66 km^{2} (82.88 sq mi)

Population (2012)
  - Total: 15,869
  - Density: 73.926/km^{2} (191.47/sq mi)

Galván, Dominican Republic is a town in the Baoruco province of the Dominican Republic.

== Sources ==
- World Gazeteer: Dominican Republic – World-Gazetteer.com
