= Dominican Act of Independence (1844) =

1844 document of the declaration of Dominican independence

- Created: January 16, 1844
- Location: General Archive of the Nation (Dominican Republic)
- Author(s): Francisco del Rosario Sánchez (drafter); Tomás Bobadilla (publisher)
- Signatories: 154
- Media type: Declaration of Independence
- Purpose: Declare the independence of the First Dominican Republic from Haiti
- Supersedes: Declaration of Independence of the Dominican People (1821)
- Superseded by: Dominican Act of Independence (1863)

The Dominican Act of Independence (1844), or the Manifesto of January 16, 1844 (Spanish: Acto de Independencia Dominicana de 1844 or Manifiesto de 16 de Enero de 1844) was a document conceived before the founding of the Dominican Republic. The manifesto is the foundational document explaining the reasons for the separation of Santo Domingo from Haiti, which controlled the entire island since 1822, serving as the de facto declaration of independence which was read when independence was proclaimed at Puerta del Conde on February 27, 1844. Aside from detailing the grievances endured during occupation, it would also go on to detail the structure of the government that would emerge following the split from the Haitian government.

== Context ==
In the wake of Jean-Pierre Boyer's fall from power in 1843, the political situation in Hispaniola had erupted in chaos. The new president, Charles Riviere-Herard, in response to reports of a movement in the east which sought the separation of the eastern part of the island from the western part, issued a widespread persecution campaign against the leaders of the movement. This event caused Juan Pablo Duarte (the leading proponent of the movement), as well as other prominent leaders to take refuge in Venezuela.

As a result, Francisco del Rosario Sánchez, Matías Ramón Mella, and Vicente Celestino Duarte were entrusted with leading the Trinitarios. Plans to bring Duarte, who was battling an illness in Curaçao, fell through, and with very little time to spare, the leaders had no choice but to act on their own in producing the document, which was eventually conceived on January 16, 1844.

== Drafting ==
The authorship of the document has been an area of debate by several historians and scholars. Haitian historian Thomas Madiou says that the manifesto was written and circulated by Francisco del Rosario Sánchez and Matías Ramón Mella. Manuel Dolores Galván states in his Obituary, published in the magazine Letras y Ciencias on November 19, 1984, that he served as Sánchez's secretary and that the manifesto was circulated in his own handwriting. In a brief historical account written in 1918 by Eustaquio Puello, he states that his father, Gabino Puello, circulated throughout the south of the island the handwritten Manifesto written by his cousin Manuel Dolores Galván at the Musié Pallén meeting.

However, other accounts reveal that the drafting of the document was the work of Tomás Bobadilla, since in a working session of the Tribunate on June 10, 1847, he would affirm it saying:

I believe, gentlemen, that no one can be a better Dominican than I. I was the first to say: God, Homeland and Liberty; I was the author of the Manifesto of January 16; on the night of February 27, I was at the head of the people; I was the President of the Governing Board...

The Constitutional Court of the Dominican Republic published the book THE JUST CAUSE OF FREEDOM, which contains the Manifesto of the peoples of the Eastern Part of the Island, formerly Spanish or Santo Domingo, on the causes of their separation from the Haitian Republic on January 16, 1844. This title comes from the Manifesto itself. The prologue is by Dominican historian Juan Daniel Balcácer, president of the Permanent Commission of National Anniversaries, who confirms that the Manifesto of January 16, 1844, also known as the Dominican Act of Independence, was authored by Bobadilla, who would go on to be among the participants that was present at the pronouncement of the Puerta del Conde on the night of February 27, 1844, the birth of First Dominican Republic.

== Details of the Manifesto ==
The original manifesto was titled as The title of the Manifestación de los pueblos de la parte del este de la isla antes española o de Santo Domingo sobre las causas de su separación de la República haitiana. The writers of the manifesto consisted of individuals who had come from several different generations, which played a part in articulating the climate of environment that had developed up until that point. Though despite the ideal differences, it was mutually agreed that by all factions that Haitian rule needed to be brought to a close. From agreement, the writers conjured up a document that detailed the system of governance that would arise following the separation. Some of the key details of the document included:

1. It outlined the grievances, economic decline, and cultural reasons behind ending 22 years of Haitian rule (1822–1844), while laying out basic principles for a free state.
2. Signed by a strategic alliance of liberal Trinitarios (such as Sánchez) and conservative landowners and leaders (such as Pedro Santana and Bobadilla).
3. Creation of a sovereign state integrated by four initial provinces: Santo Domingo, Santiago, Azua, and El Seibo.
4. Establishment of a democratic republican system under a Constitution which provisions includes civil and political equality, freedom of the press, freedom of religion/cults, and the abolition of slavery.

== See also ==
- Haitian occupation of Santo Domingo
- First Dominican Republic
- Dominican War of Independence
