= Galvanus de Bettino =

14th-century Italian theologian

Galvanus de Bettino (also Galvanus de Bononia, Galvanus de Becchini) (c. 1335 – c. 1394) was an Italian theologian. He was the first to hold the chair in canon law at Fünfkirchen (now Pécs) in Hungary in 1371.

Galvanus received his doctorate in canon law at Padua in 1361. He taught there at least for the years 1365-1368. After his appointment at Pécs, he returned to lecture in Bologna in 1374. From 1379 to 1382 her returned to Padua, then finished his career in Bologna until his death, which occurred before 1395.

== Works ==
- Contrarietates glossarum iuris canonici
- Casus qui iudicis arbitrio relinquitur
- Tractatus de differentiis legum et canonum
