= Dino (footballer, born 1901) =

Brazilian footballer

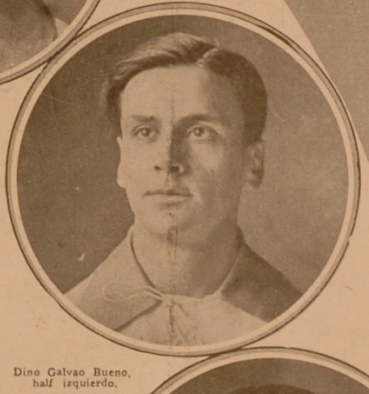

Personal information
- Full name: Antonio Dino Galvão Bueno
- Date of birth: 21 September 1901
- Place of birth: Rio de Janeiro, Brazil
- Date of death: 11 September 1993 (aged 91)
- Position: Midfielder

International career
Years	Team	Apps	(Gls)
1921–1923	Brazil	7	(0)

Antonio Dino Galvão (21 September 1901 – 11 September 1993), known as just Dino, was a Brazilian footballer. He played in seven matches for the Brazil national football team from 1921 to 1923. He was also part of Brazil's squad for the 1921 South American Championship.
