= History of the Dominican Republic =

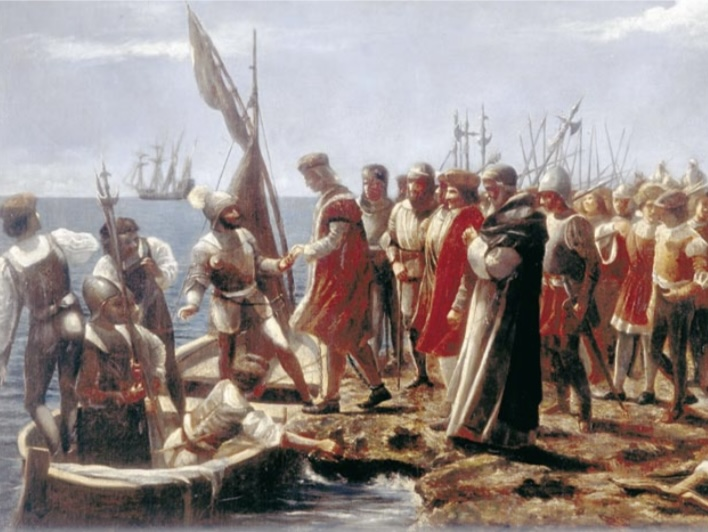
Arrival of Christopher Columbus, art by Dominican painter Luis Desangles

The recorded history of the Dominican Republic began in 1492 when Christopher Columbus, working for the Crown of Castile, arrived at a large island in the western Atlantic Ocean, later known as the Caribbean. The native Taíno people, an Arawakan people, had inhabited the island during the pre-Columbian era, dividing it into five chiefdoms. They referred to the eastern part of the island as Quisqueya, meaning 'mother of all lands.' Columbus claimed the island for Castile, naming it La Isla Española ('the Spanish Island'), which was later Latinized to Hispaniola.

Following 25 years of Spanish occupation, the Taíno population in the Spanish-controlled regions of the island drastically decreased due to the Taíno genocide. With fewer than 50,000 survivors, those remaining intermixed with Spaniards, Africans, and others, leading to the formation of the present-day tripartite Dominican population. The area that would become the Dominican Republic remained the Captaincy General of Santo Domingo until 1821, except during the Era de Francia, when it was a French colony from 1795 to 1815. It briefly became an independent state in 1821, known as the Republic of Spanish Haiti, until it was annexed and merged by Haiti into Republic of Haiti from 1822 to 1844.

In 1844, the Dominican Republic declared its independence, establishing the First Dominican Republic. The republic maintained its independence except for a brief annexation by Spain from 1861 to 1865, after which the Second Dominican Republic was established. The country later experienced its first occupation by the United States from 1916 to 1924, followed by the establishment of the Third Dominican Republic.

During the 19th century, the Dominican Republic frequently engaged in conflicts involving the French, Haitians, Spanish, and internal factions. This period was characterized by a society heavily influenced by caudillos, who exercised control over the nation as a personalised dictatorship. Between 1844 and 1914, the Dominican Republic underwent numerous leadership transitions, with 53 individuals assuming the presidency, although only three completed their terms. The country also saw the adoption of 19 constitutions, with many leaders obtaining power through military force. During this period, three presidents were assassinated: José Antonio Salcedo in 1864, Ulises Heureaux in 1899, and Ramón Cáceres in 1911.

In 1930, the Dominican Republic came under the rule of Rafael Trujillo, a dictator who maintained control until his assassination in 1961. Following Trujillo's regime, Juan Bosch was democratically elected president in 1962 but was removed from office in a military coup d'état in 1963. The Dominican Civil War in 1965 lead to a U.S.-led intervention prompted by an uprising to restore Bosch to power and allegations of communist support for the coup. In 1966, Joaquín Balaguer, a caudillo, defeated Bosch in the presidential election and remained in power for 30 years. Due to U.S. pressure in response to flawed elections, Balaguer was compelled to shorten his term in 1996.

Subsequent to this period, the Dominican Republic has conducted regular competitive elections, with opposition candidates successfully assuming the presidency, showing a transition towards more stable democracy.

== Pre-European history ==
Chiefdoms of Hispaniola. Marién, Maguá, Maguana, Jaragua and Higüey

The islands of the Caribbean were first settled around 6,000 years ago by hunter-gatherer peoples originating from Central America or northern South America. The Arawakan-speaking ancestors of the Taíno moved into the Caribbean from South America during the 1st millennium BC, reaching Hispaniola by around 600 AD. These Arawakan peoples engaged in farming, fishing, hunting and gathering, and the widespread production of ceramic goods. The estimates of Hispaniola's population in 1492 vary widely, including tens of thousands, 100,000, 300,000, and 400,000-2,000,000. Estimating how many people lived on the island in pre-Columbian times is challenging, as no accurate records exist. At the time of Columbus' arrival in 1492, the island's territory consisted of five Taíno chiefdoms: Marién, Maguá, Maguana, Jaragua, and Higüey. These were ruled respectively by caciques Guacanagarix, Guarionex, Caonabo, Bohechío, and Cayacoa. The Taíno name for the entire island was either Ayiti (land of high mountains) or Quisqueya (mother of all lands).

== Spanish colony (1492–1795) ==
=== Arrival of the Spanish ===
Spanish penetration into the island

Christopher Columbus reached the island of Hispañola on his first voyage, in December 1492. Guacanagarí, the chief who hosted Columbus and his men, treated them kindly and provided them with everything they desired. However, the Taínos' egalitarian social system clashed with the Europeans' feudalist system, which had more rigid class structures. The Europeans believed the Taínos to be either weak or misleading, and they began to treat the tribes with violence. Columbus successfully tempered this trend, and he and his men departed from Quisqueya, the Taínos' name for the island, on good terms.

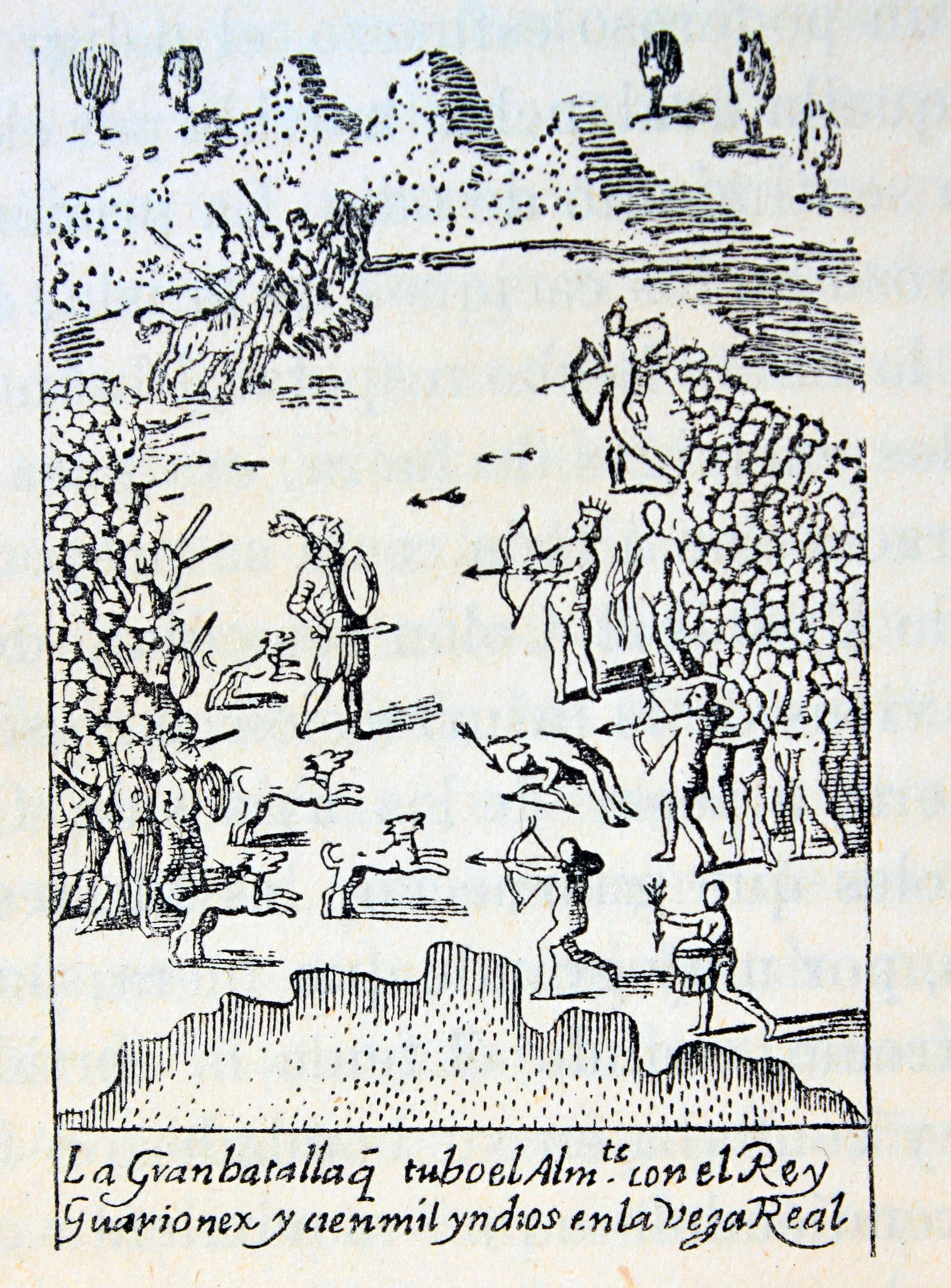
Battle of Vega Real (1494)

After the sinking of the Santa María, Columbus established a small fort to support his claim to the island. The fort was called La Navidad because the shipwrecking and the founding of the fort occurred on Christmas Day. While Columbus was away, the garrison manning the fort was wracked by divisions that evolved into conflict. The more rapacious men began to terrorize the Taíno, the Ciguayo, and the Macorix peoples, which included attempts to take their women. Guacanagarix tried to reach an accommodation with the Spaniards; however, the Spaniards and some of his own people viewed him as weak. The Spaniards treated him with contempt, including the kidnapping of some of his wives. Fed up, the powerful Cacique Caonabo of the Maguana Chiefdom attacked the Europeans and destroyed La Navidad. Guacanagarix was dismayed by these events but did not try hard to aid the Europeans, probably hoping that the troublesome outsiders would never return.

In 1493, Columbus came back to the island on his second voyage and founded the first Spanish colony in the New World, the city of La Isabela. Isabela nearly failed because of hunger and disease. In 1496, Santo Domingo was built and became the new capital, and remains the oldest continuously inhabited European city in the Americas.

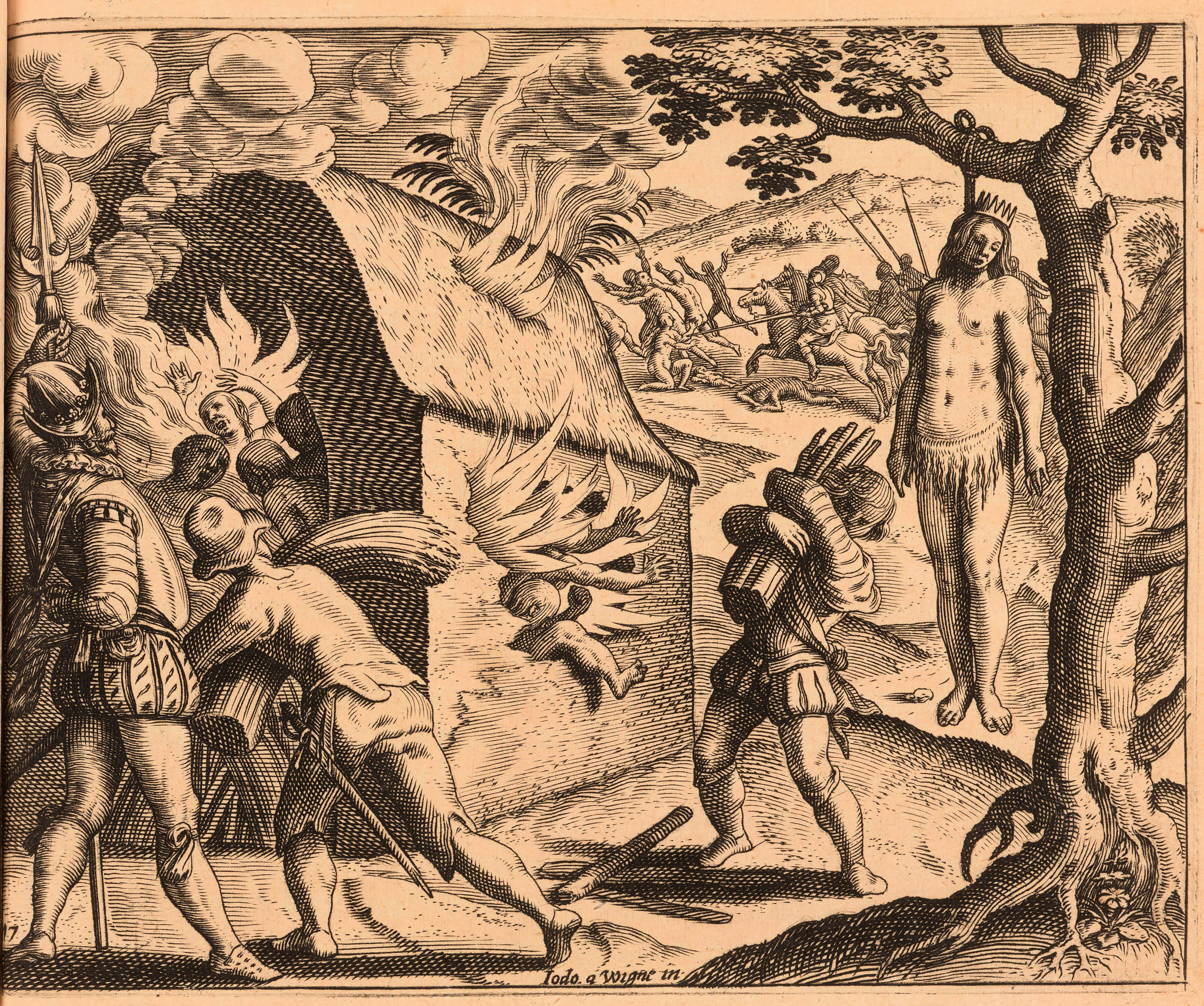
Massacre of Queen Anacaona and her subjects

An estimated 400,000 Tainos living on the island were soon enslaved to work in gold mines. By 1508, their numbers had decreased to around 60,000 because of forced labor, hunger, disease, and the Taíno genocide. By 1535, only a few dozen were still alive.

During this period, the colony's Spanish leadership changed several times. When Columbus departed on another exploration, Francisco de Bobadilla became governor. Settlers' allegations of mismanagement by Columbus helped create a tumultuous political situation. In 1502, Nicolás de Ovando replaced de Bobadilla as governor, with an ambitious plan to expand Spanish influence in the region. It was he who dealt most brutally with the Taíno people. The Taino population declined by up to 95% in the century after the Spanish arrival, from a pre contact population of tens of thousands to 8,000,000. Many authors have described the treatment of the Taino in Hispaniola under the Spanish Empire as genocide. In 1511, Antonio de Montesinos denounced the abuses against the indigenous people.

One rebel, however, successfully fought back. Enriquillo led a group who fled to the mountains and attacked the Spanish repeatedly for fourteen years. The Spanish ultimately offered him a peace treaty and gave Enriquillo and his followers their own town in 1534.

=== Sixteenth century ===
Captaincy General of Santo Domingo, territory of the Spanish Empire, when the entire island belonged to Spain and was the capital of the Viceroyalty of the Indies

In 1501, the Spanish monarchs, Ferdinand I and Isabella, first granted permission to the colonists of the Caribbean to import African slaves, who began arriving to the island in 1503. In 1510, the first sizable shipment, consisting of 250 Black Ladinos, arrived in Hispaniola from Spain. Eight years later African-born slaves arrived in the West Indies. The Colony of Santo Domingo was organized as the Royal Audiencia of Santo Domingo in 1511. Sugar cane was introduced to Hispaniola from the Canary Islands, and the first sugar mill in the New World was established in 1516, on Hispaniola. The need for a labor force to meet the growing demands of sugar cane cultivation led to an exponential increase in the importation of slaves over the following two decades. The sugar mill owners soon formed a new colonial elite and convinced the Spanish king to allow them to elect the members of the Real Audiencia from their ranks. Poorer colonists subsisted by hunting the herds of wild cattle that roamed throughout the island and selling their hides.

The first major slave revolt in the Americas occurred in Santo Domingo on December 25, 1521, when enslaved Muslims of the Wolof nation led an uprising in the sugar plantation of admiral Don Diego Colon, son of Christopher Columbus. Many of these insurgents managed to escape to the mountains where they formed independent maroon communities, but the Admiral had a lot of the captured rebels hanged. Latter that decade, there were other rebellions of enslaved Africans.

While sugar cane dramatically increased Spain's earnings on the island, large numbers of the newly imported slaves fled into the nearly impassable mountain ranges in the island's interior, joining the growing communities of cimarrónes—literally, 'maroon'. By the 1530s, cimarrón bands had become so numerous that in rural areas the Spaniards could only safely travel outside their plantations in large armed groups. When Archdeacon Alonso de Castro toured Hispaniola in 1542, he estimated the maroon population at 2,000–3,000 persons, living mainly on the Cape of San Nicolas, in the Ciguayos, on the Samana peninsular, and on the Cape of Iguey.

Beginning in the 1520s, the Caribbean Sea was raided by increasingly numerous French corsairs. In 1541, Spain authorized the construction of Santo Domingo's fortified wall, and in 1560 decided to restrict sea travel to enormous, well-armed convoys. In another move, which would destroy Hispaniola's sugar industry, in 1561 Havana, more strategically located in relation to the Gulf Stream, was selected as the designated stopping point for the merchant flotas, which had a royal monopoly on commerce with the Americas. In 1564, the island's main inland cities Santiago de los Caballeros and Concepción de la Vega were destroyed by an earthquake.

With the conquest of the American mainland, Hispaniola quickly declined. Most Spanish colonists left for the silver-mines of Mexico and Peru, while new immigrants from Spain bypassed the island. Agriculture dwindled, new imports of slaves ceased, and white colonists, free blacks, and slaves alike lived in poverty, weakening the racial hierarchy and aiding intermixing, resulting in a population of predominantly mixed Spaniard, African, and Taíno descent. Except for the city of Santo Domingo, which managed to maintain some legal exports, Dominican ports were forced to rely on foreign contraband trade, which, along with livestock, became the sole source of livelihood for the island dwellers.

In 1586, the privateer Francis Drake of England captured the city of Santo Domingo, collecting a ransom for its return to Spanish rule. In 1592, Christopher Newport of England attacked the town of Azua on the bay of Ocoa, which was taken and plundered.

=== Seventeenth century ===
The smuggling crisis in Santo Domingo

The smuggling crisis in Santo Domingo

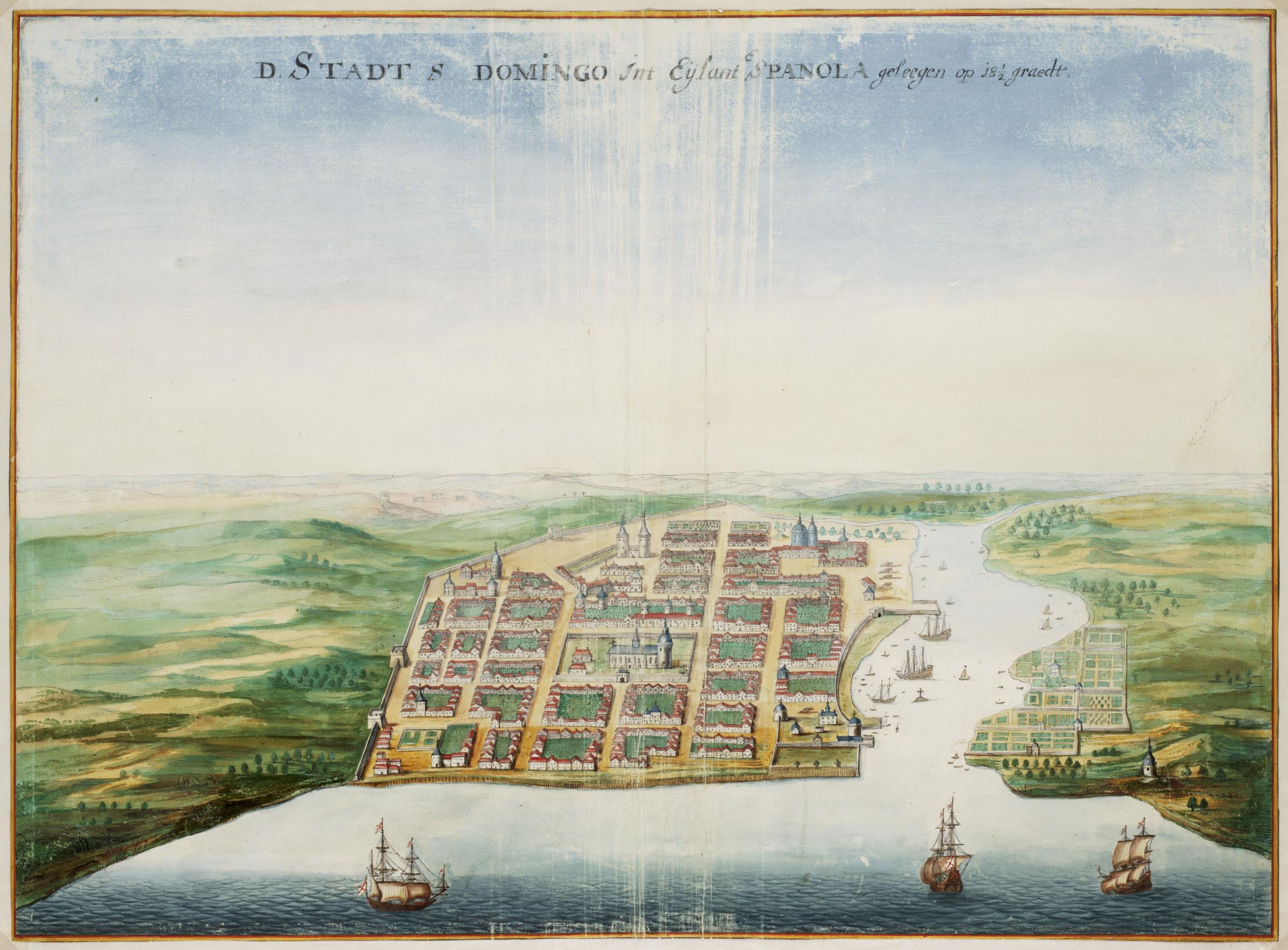
Painting by Johannes Vingboons of Santo Domingo, c. 1665

In 1605, Spain was infuriated that Spanish settlements on the northern and western coasts of the island were carrying out large scale and illegal trade with the Dutch, who were at that time fighting a war of independence against Spain in northern Europe, and the English, a very recent enemy state, and so decided to forcibly resettle the colony's inhabitants closer to the city of Santo Domingo. This action, known as the Devastaciones de Osorio, proved disastrous; more than half of the resettled colonists died of starvation or disease, over 100,000 cattle were abandoned, and many slaves escaped. Five of the existing thirteen settlements on the island were brutally razed by Spanish troops – many of the inhabitants fought, escaped to the jungle, or fled to the safety of passing Dutch ships. The settlements of La Yaguana, and Bayaja, on the west and north coasts respectively of modern-day Haiti were burned, as were the settlements of Monte Cristi and Puerto Plata on the north coast and San Juan de la Maguana in the southwestern area of the modern-day Dominican Republic.

French and English buccaneers took advantage of Spain's retreat into a corner of Hispaniola to settle the island of Tortuga, off the northwest coast of Hispaniola, in 1629. France established direct control in 1640, reorganizing it into an official colony and expanding to the north coast of Hispaniola itself, whose western end Spain ceded to France in 1697 under the Treaty of Ryswick.

In 1655, Oliver Cromwell dispatched an English fleet, commanded by Admiral Sir William Penn, to capture Santo Domingo. After meeting heavy resistance, the fleet withdrew. Penn's fleet proceeded to capture the nearby Spanish colony of Santiago, which became known as Jamaica and other foreign strongholds subsequently began to be established throughout the West Indies. Madrid sought to contest such encroachments on its own imperial control by using Santo Domingo as a forward military base, but Spanish power was by now too depleted to recapture lost colonies. The city itself was furthermore subjected to a smallpox epidemic, cacao blight, and hurricane in 1666; another storm two years later; a second epidemic in 1669; a third hurricane in September 1672; plus an earthquake in May 1673 that killed twenty-four residents.

=== Eighteenth century ===
The House of Bourbon replaced the House of Habsburg in Spain in 1700 and introduced economic reforms. Santo Domingo's isolation from Spain and economic decline under failed Bourbon Reforms created widespread poverty and trade collapse. This led some of its residents to participate in crown-licensed privateering in the eighteenth century. Dominican privateers primarily captured English and Dutch sloops and schooners, mainly in the waters around Santo Domingo and Puerto Rico.

The population of Santo Domingo grew from about 6,000 in 1737 to approximately 125,000 in 1790. Of this number, about 40,000 were white landowners, about 25,000 were mulatto freedmen, and some 60,000 were slaves. However, it remained poor and neglected, particularly in contrast with its western, French neighbor Saint-Domingue, which became the wealthiest colony in the New World and had half a million inhabitants.

The colonial elites of St. Domingue offered the principal market for Santo Domingo's exports of beef, hides, mahogany, and tobacco. With the outbreak of the Haitian Revolution in 1791, the rich urban families linked to the colonial bureaucracy fled the island, while most of the rural hateros (cattle ranchers) remained, even though they lost their principal market. Spain saw in the unrest an opportunity to seize all, or part, of the western third of the island in an alliance of convenience with the rebellious slaves. But after the slaves and French reconciled, the Spanish suffered a setback, and in 1795, France gained control of the whole island under the Treaty of Basel.

== French occupation (1795–1809) ==
In 1801, Toussaint Louverture arrived in Santo Domingo, proclaiming the abolition of slavery on behalf of the French Republic. Shortly afterwards, Napoleon dispatched an army which subdued the whole island and ruled it for a few months. Mulattoes and blacks again rose up against these French in October 1802 and finally defeated them in November 1803. On 1 January 1804, the victors declared Saint-Domingue to be the independent republic of Haiti, the Taíno name for the entire island. Even after their defeat by the Haitians, a small French garrison remained in Santo Domingo. Slavery was reestablished and many of the émigré Spanish colonists returned. In 1805, Jean-Jacques Dessalines, after crowning himself Emperor, invaded, reaching Santo Domingo before retreating in the face of a French naval squadron. In their retreat through the Cibao, the Haitians sacked the towns of Santiago and Moca, slaughtering most of their residents.

The French held on to the eastern part of the island until dealt a serious blow by Juan Sánchez Ramírez at the Battle of Palo Hincado on November 7, 1808. With the help of a British fleet, Ramírez laid siege to the city of Santo Domingo. The French in the besieged city finally capitulated on July 9, 1809, initiating a twelve-year period of Spanish rule, known in Dominican history as España Boba ('the Foolish Spain').

== Spanish colony (1809–1821) ==
The population of the new Spanish colony stood at approximately 104,000. Of this number, about 30,000 were slaves, working predominantly on cattle ranches, and the rest a mixture of Spanish, taino and black. The European Spaniards were few, and consisted principally of Catalans and Canary Islanders.

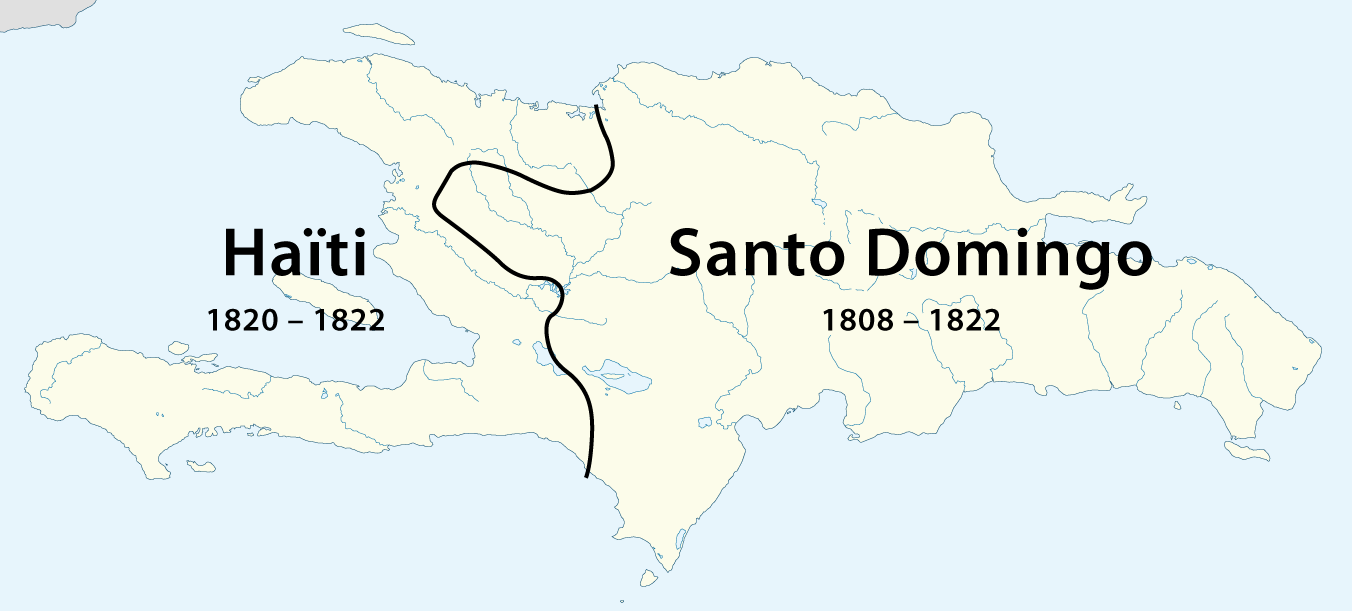
Santo Domingo before the Haitian annexation

During this period in time, the Spanish crown wielded little to no influence in the colony of Santo Domingo. Some wealthy cattle ranchers had become leaders, and sought to bring control and order in the southeast of the colony where the "law of machete" ruled the land. On December 1, 1821, the former Captain general in charge of the colony, José Núñez de Cáceres, influenced by all the Revolutions that were going on around him, finally decided to overthrow the Spanish government and proclaimed the independence of "Spanish Haiti".

The white and mulatto slave owners on the eastern part of the island—recognizing their vulnerability both to Spanish and to Haitian attack and also seeking to maintain their slaves as property—attempted to annex themselves to Gran Colombia. While this request was in transit, Jean-Pierre Boyer, the ruler of Haiti, invaded Santo Domingo on February 9, 1822, with a 10,000-strong army. Having no capacity to resist, Núñez de Cáceres surrendered the capital.

== Haitian occupation (1822–1844) ==
The twenty-two-year Haitian occupation that followed is recalled by Dominicans as a period of brutal military rule, though the reality is more complex. It led to large-scale land expropriations and failed efforts to force production of export crops, impose military services, restrict the use of the Spanish language, and eliminate traditional customs such as cockfighting. It reinforced Dominicans' perceptions of themselves as different from Haitians in "language, race, religion and domestic customs". Yet, this was also a period that definitively ended slavery as an institution in the eastern part of the island.

Haiti's constitution forbade whites from owning land, and the major landowning families were forcibly deprived of their properties. Most emigrated to the Spanish colonies of Cuba and Puerto Rico, or to independent Gran Colombia, usually with the encouragement of Haitian officials, who acquired their lands. The Haitians, who associated the Catholic Church with the French slave-masters who had exploited them before independence, confiscated all church property, deported all foreign clergy, and severed the ties of the remaining clergy to the Vatican. Santo Domingo's university, the oldest in the Western Hemisphere, lacking students, teachers, and resources, closed down. In order to receive diplomatic recognition from France and end the threat of a French invasion, Haiti was forced to pay an indemnity of 150 million francs to the former French colonists, which was subsequently lowered to 60 million francs, and Haiti imposed heavy taxes on the eastern part of the island. Since Haiti was unable to adequately provision its army, the occupying forces largely survived by commandeering or confiscating food and supplies at gunpoint.

Attempts to redistribute land conflicted with the system of communal land tenure (terrenos comuneros), which had arisen with the ranching economy, and newly emancipated slaves resented being forced to grow cash crops under Boyer's Code Rural. In rural areas, the Haitian administration was usually too inefficient to enforce its own laws. It was in the city of Santo Domingo that the effects of the occupation were most acutely felt, and it was there that the movement for independence originated.

== Independence: First Republic (1844–1861) ==
On July 16, 1838, Juan Pablo Duarte together with Pedro Alejandrino Pina, Juan Isidro Pérez, Felipe Alfau, Benito González, Félix María Ruiz, Juan Nepomuceno Ravelo and Jacinto de la Concha founded a secret society called La Trinitaria to win independence from Haiti. A short time later, they were joined by Matías Ramón Mella, and Francisco del Rosario Sánchez. In 1843, they allied with a Haitian movement in overthrowing Boyer. Because they had revealed themselves as revolutionaries working for Dominican independence, the new Haitian president, Charles Rivière-Hérard, exiled or imprisoned the leading Trinitarios (Trinitarians). At the same time, Buenaventura Báez, an Azua mahogany exporter and deputy in the Haitian National Assembly, was negotiating with the French Consul-General for the establishment of a French protectorate. In an uprising timed to preempt Báez, on February 27, 1844, the Trinitarios declared independence from Haiti, expelling all Haitians and confiscating their property. The Trinitarios were backed by Pedro Santana, a wealthy cattle-rancher from El Seibo who commanded a private army of peons who worked on his estates.

=== War of Independence ===
War of Independence
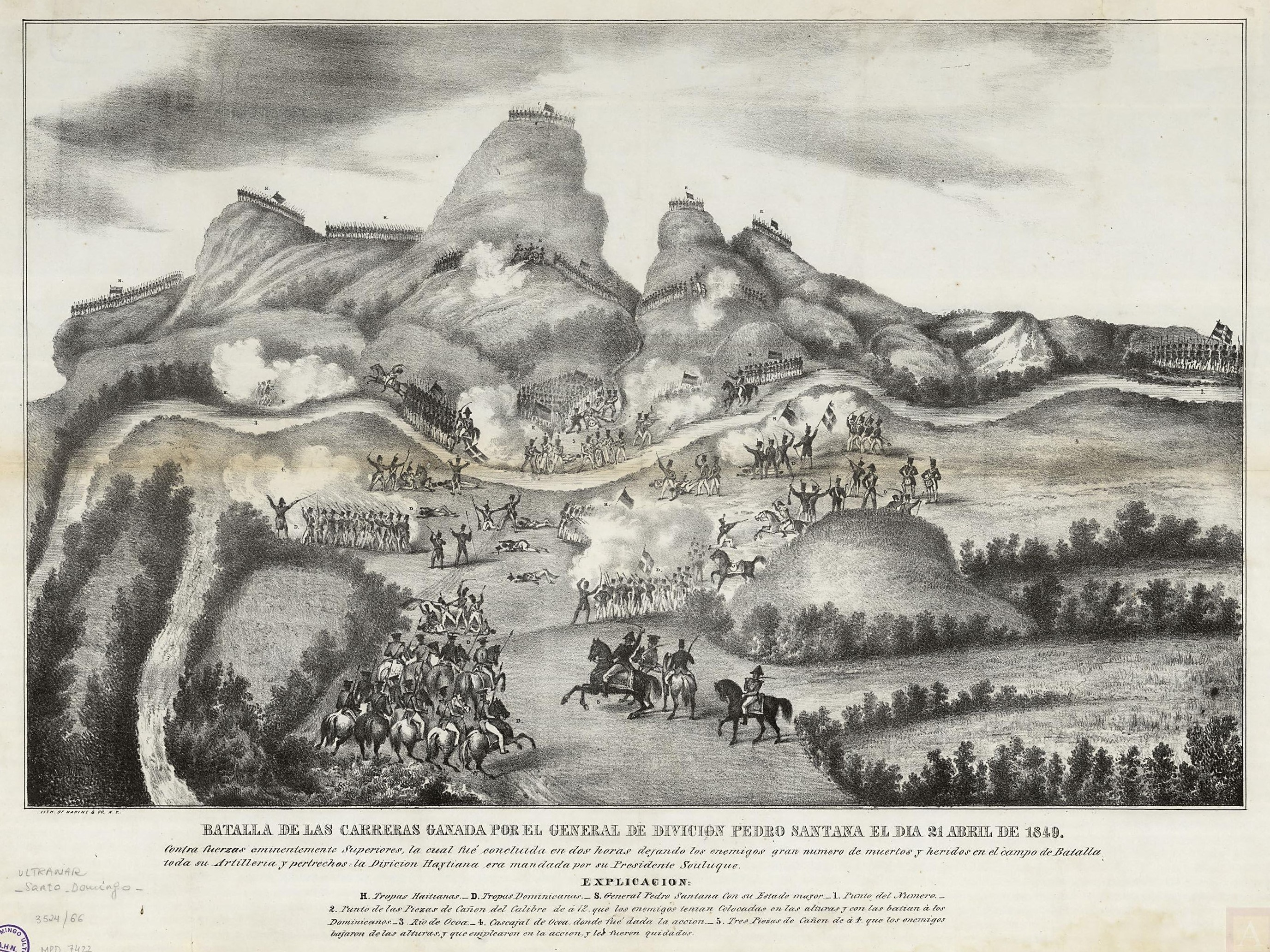
- Battle of Las Carreras
Date	1844, 1845, 1849, 1854–56
Location	Dominican Republic, Haiti
Result	Dominican victory

Belligerents
Dominican Republic	Republic of Haiti (1844–49); Empire of Haiti (1849–56)

Commanders and leaders
Pedro Santana; Antonio Duvergé; Buenaventura Báez; Juan B. Cambiaso; Manuel Mota; José Mª. Cabral; José Mª. Imbert; J. J. Puello; Pedro E. Pelletier; Juan Alejandro Acosta; Juan Pablo Duarte; Ramón Matías Mella; Francisco del Rosario Sánchez	(Haiti) Charles Rivière-Hérard; (Haiti) Jean-Louis Pierrot; (Haiti) Faustin I; Antoine Pierrot †

Strength
10,000	40,000

Casualties and losses
- Haiti is estimated to have lost more than twice as many troops as the Dominican Republic

On March 10, 1844, Hérard sent three columns totaling 30,000 troops into the Dominican Republic, but the Dominicans defeated the Haitian army by March 30. On April 15, three Dominican schooners defeated a Haitian brigantine and two Haitian schooners off the coast of Azua. As a result of these Haitian defeats, Hérard was overthrown on May 3, leading to a temporary suspension of Haitian military operations. On June 17, 1845, Dominican troops invaded Haitian territory in retaliation for border raids, capturing two Haitian towns and establishing a fortified position. The Haitian army counterattacked on July 22, driving the invaders back across the frontier.

On August 6, 1845, Haitian President Jean-Louis Pierrot ordered an invasion of the Dominican Republic. On September 17, Dominican troops defeated the Haitian vanguard on the southern frontier, repelling a cavalry charge. Pierrot issued "letters of marque" against ships trading with the Dominican Republic and declared all Dominican ports closed on September 27, but lacked a navy to enforce this. Haitian privateers attacked Dominican merchant ships, damaging their trade. On the same day, Dominican troops defeated a Haitian army at the battle of "Beler," a frontier fortification, resulting in the deaths of three Haitian generals, including the army's commander. On October 28, another Haitian force attacked the frontier fort "El Invencible" but was repulsed after five hours of fighting. A Haitian squadron carrying troops to Puerto Plata was driven aground by bad weather on December 21, and the admiral and 148 others were taken prisoner. Shortly after announcing a new campaign for 1846, Pierrot was overthrown on February 27.

Faustin Soulouque, now governing Haiti, launched a new invasion of the Dominican Republic. On March 21, 1849, Haitian soldiers attacked the Dominican garrison at Las Matas. Soulouque then captured San Juan, leaving Azua as the last Dominican stronghold before the capital. Since a Dominican flotilla dominated the coastal road with its cannons, he had to take a longer route to Azua and could not receive supplies from the sea. On April 2, President Manuel Jimenes called upon former President Santana to lead the defense. Azua fell to the Haitians on April 6, and a Dominican counterattack failed. On April 22, Santana defeated the Haitian army personally commanded by Soulouque during the two-day Battle of Las Carreras. The Haitians opened the battle with a cannon barrage, then advanced with infantry and cavalry, but their advance was halted by sustained rifle fire. The outnumbered Dominicans counterattacked with machetes and lances, resulting in a disorganized Haitian retreat. As the Haitians withdrew, they came under gunboat fire and quickly torched Azua and the surrounding hamlets of Neiba, San Juan, and Las Matas.

In November 1849, President Báez launched a naval offensive against Haiti. Entire villages along the Haitian coast were plundered and burned, and the crews of captured enemy ships were butchered without regard to age or gender. Dominican and Haitian flotillas encountered each other off Les Cayes, but a storm broke up the battle. The Haitian squadron consisted of a corvette and three schooners. By late 1854, the Hispaniolan nations were at war again. In November, two Dominican ships captured a Haitian warship and bombarded two Haitian ports. In November 1855, a force of 30,000 Haitian troops invaded the Dominican Republic along three routes: one from the north, one through the center, and one from the south. The Dominican frontier forces made a tactical withdrawal, and the Dominican navy prevented the Haitians from receiving supplies by sea. On December 22, Dominican troops defeated the southern column at the Battle of Santomé, killing 695 Haitians, including General Antoine Pierrot. On January 27, 1856, some 8,000 Dominicans defeated 22,000 Haitians at the Battle of Sabana Larga near Dajabón after eight hours of fighting, which came down to hand-to-hand combat. Thousands of Haitian dead or dying were abandoned on the battlefield as their forces retreated back across the border.

=== First Republic ===
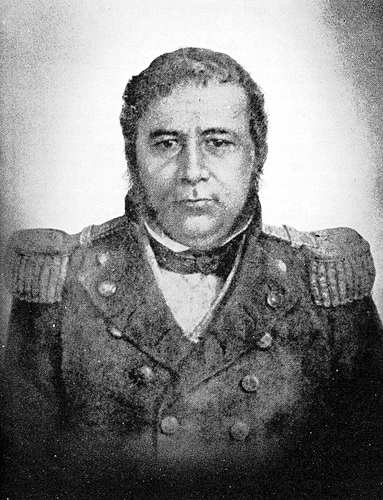
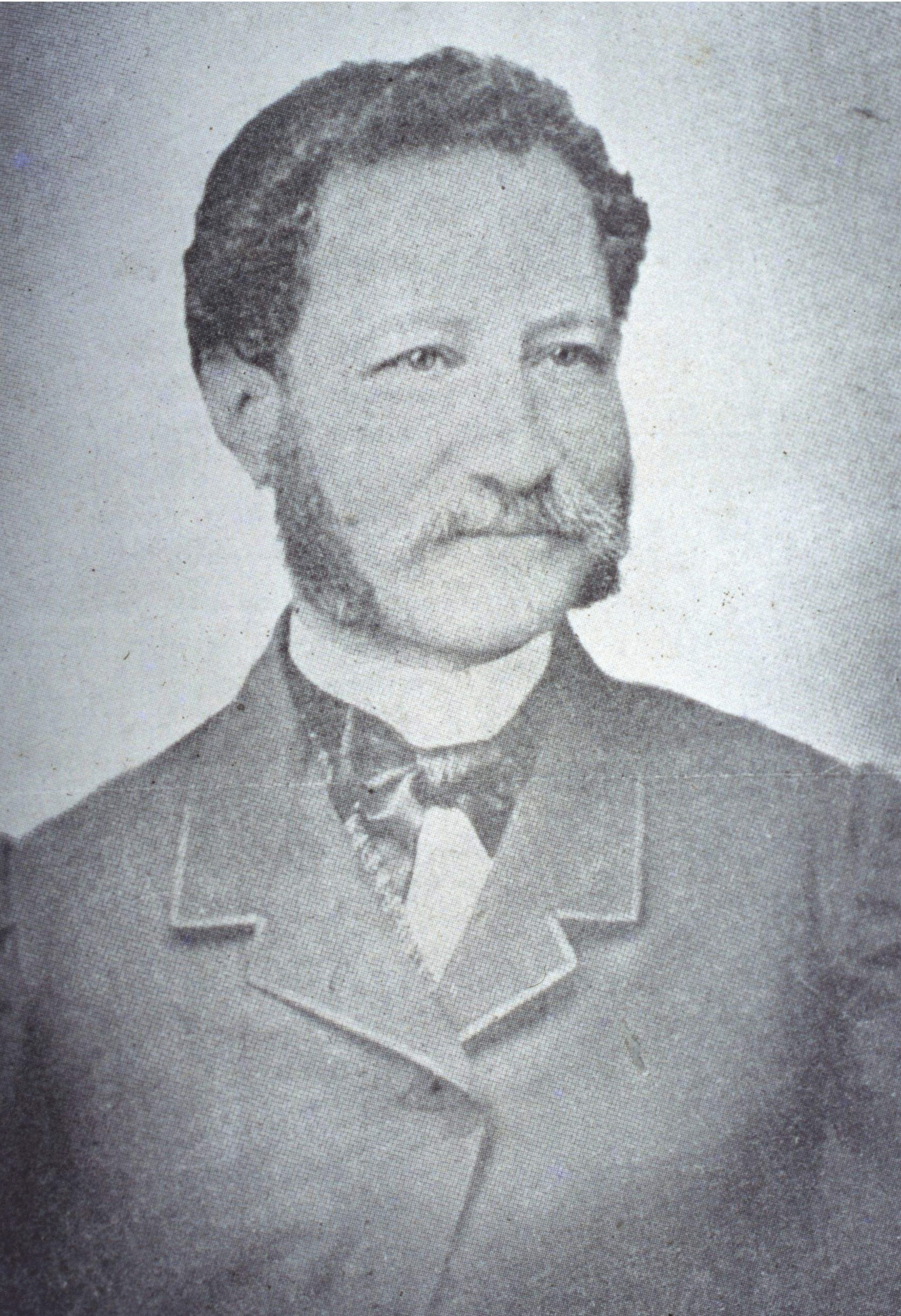
Pedro Santana and Buenaventura Báez

In July 1844, Pedro Santana seized power from the liberal president Francisco del Rosario Sánchez in a military coup after Rosario Sánchez ousted the conservative Tomás Bobadilla from power. Santana inaugurated a military dictatorship with Bobadilla as a member of his junta.

The Dominican Republic's first constitution was adopted on November 6, 1844. The state was commonly known as Santo Domingo in English until the early 20th century. It featured a presidential form of government with many liberal tendencies, but it was marred by Article 210, imposed by Santana on the constitutional assembly by force, giving him the privileges of a dictatorship until the war of independence was over. These privileges not only served him to win the war but also allowed him to persecute, execute and drive into exile his political opponents, among which Duarte was the most important. Santana imprisoned and ultimately exiled Duarte to Germany. Santana made the first martyr of the republic when he had María Trinidad Sánchez executed for refusing to name "conspirators" against him.

Santana used the ever-present threat of Haitian invasion as a justification for consolidating dictatorial powers. For the Dominican elite—mostly landowners, merchants and priests—the threat of re-annexation by more populous Haiti was sufficient to seek protection from a foreign power. Offering the deepwater harbor of Samaná bay as bait, over the next two decades, negotiations were made with Britain, France, the United States and Spain to declare a protectorate over the country.

Without adequate roads, the regions of the Dominican Republic developed in isolation from one another. In the south, the economy was dominated by cattle-ranching (particularly in the southeastern savannah) and cutting mahogany and other hardwoods for export. This region retained a semi-feudal character, with little commercial agriculture, the hacienda as the dominant social unit, and the majority of the population living at a subsistence level. In the Cibao Valley, the nation's richest farmland, peasants supplemented their subsistence crops by growing tobacco for export, mainly to Germany. Tobacco required less land than cattle ranching and was mainly grown by smallholders, who relied on itinerant traders to transport their crops to Puerto Plata and Monte Cristi. Santana antagonized the Cibao farmers, enriching himself and his supporters at their expense by resorting to multiple peso printings that allowed him to buy their crops for a fraction of their value.

In 1848, Santana was forced to resign and was succeeded by his vice-president, Manuel Jimenes. After returning to lead Dominican forces against a new Haitian invasion in 1849, Santana marched on Santo Domingo, deposing Jimenes. At his behest, Congress elected Buenaventura Báez as president. In 1853, Santana was elected president for his second term, forcing Báez into exile. After repulsing the last Haitian invasion, Santana negotiated a treaty leasing a portion of Samaná Peninsula to a U.S. company; popular opposition forced him to abdicate, enabling Báez to return and seize power. With the treasury depleted, Báez printed eighteen million uninsured pesos, purchasing the 1857 tobacco crop with this currency and exporting it for hard cash at immense profit to himself and his followers. The Cibanian tobacco planters, who were ruined when inflation ensued, revolted and formed a new government headed by José Desiderio Valverde and headquartered in Santiago de los Caballeros. In July 1857, General Juan Luis Franco Bidó besieged Santo Domingo. The Cibao-based government declared an amnesty to exiles and Santana returned and managed to replace Franco Bidó in September 1857. After a year of civil war, Santana captured Santo Domingo in June 1858, overthrew both Báez and Valverde and installed himself as president.

== Spanish colony (1861–1865) ==
Pedro Santana inherited a bankrupt government on the brink of collapse and initiated negotiations with Queen Isabella II of Spain to have the eastern two-thirds of the island reconverted into a Spanish overseas territory. The U.S. Civil War rendered the United States incapable of enforcing the Monroe Doctrine. In March 1861, Santana officially restored the Dominican Republic to Spain. This move was widely rejected and there were several failed uprisings against Spanish rule. On July 4, 1861, former President Francisco del Rosario Sánchez was captured and executed by Santana after leading a failed invasion of Santo Domingo from Haiti.

Santana, who had been given the title of Marquess of Las Carreras by Queen Isabella II, thought he could perpetrate a fraud on the Spaniards similar to those he had carried out in the Cibao. When negotiations concluded and Spain agreed on an amortization rate for Dominican pesos, Santana printed 33 million more, so Spain would be forced to provide far more money to him and his associates, to whom he distributed the pesos as gifts. Under the annexation terms, General Santana retained military command of the new Spanish province, answering only to Spain's regional commander in Puerto Rico, but it soon became obvious that Spanish authorities planned to deprive him of his power. His associates were removed from military positions, the 33 million pesos he printed were refused for amortization, and he was ultimately deposed in July 1862 and replaced with Felipe Ribero y Lemoine.

By 1863, uprisings had spread throughout the colony, leading to the outbreak of guerrilla warfare. In February, the Spanish authorities declared a state of siege in the territory. In April, the Spanish Army defeated the Dominican forces led by General Lucas de Peña at Cibao. In order to reinforce their position with an auxiliary force to keep public order in the cities, a militia named Volunteers was created in Santo Domingo City, following the example of the militia of the same name previously created in Cuba and Puerto Rico.

=== War of Restoration ===
War of Restoration
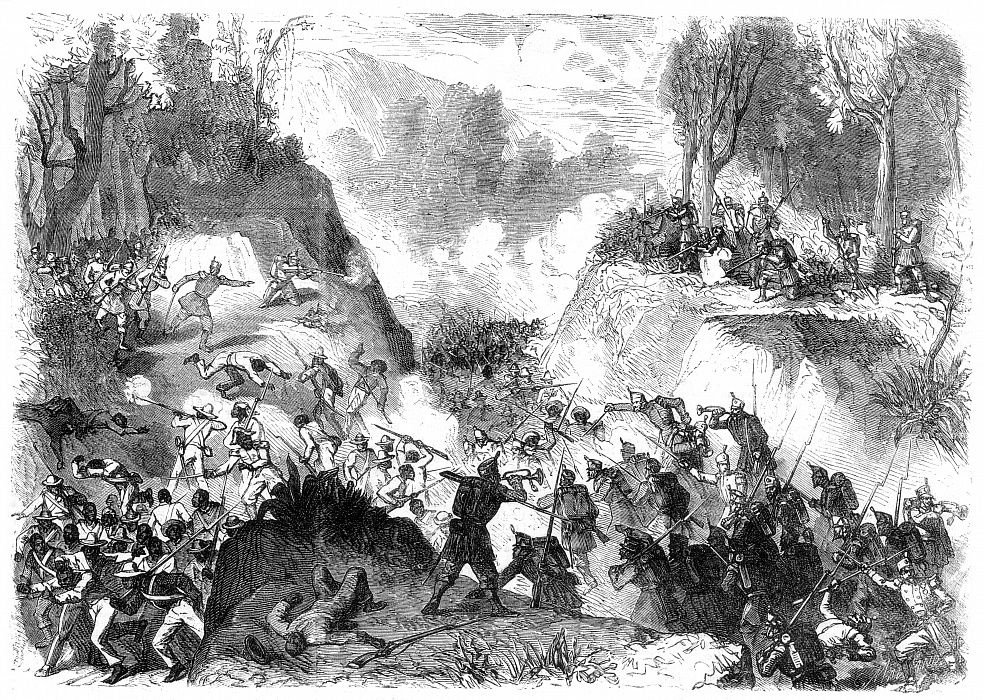
- Battle of Monte Cristi
Date	August 16, 1863 – July 11, 1865 (1 year, 10 months, 3 weeks and 4 days)
Location	Dominican Republic
Result	Dominican victory

Belligerents
Dominican Republic	(Spain) Spanish Empire

Commanders and leaders
(Dominican Republic) José Antonio Salcedo X; (Dominican Republic) Gregorio Luperón; (Dominican Republic) Santiago Rodríguez; (Dominican Republic) Gaspar Polanco; (Dominican Republic) José María Cabral	(Spain) Pedro Santana #; (Spain) José de la Gándara; (Spain) Carlos de Vargas; (Spain) Carlos Palanca Gutiérrez; (Spain) Manuel Buceta

Strength
15,000–17,000	30,000 Spanish; 22 warships; 12,000 Dominican auxiliaries

Casualties and losses
4,000 dead	10,888 killed or wounded in action 9,000 dead from disease; 10,000 Dominican auxiliaries (battle casualties and disease deaths)

On August 16, 1863, fourteen Dominican dissidents led by Santiago Rodríguez crossed the northeastern border into Spanish-held territory and called for the population to rise against the invaders. They defeated a small Spanish detachment, and the insurrection quickly spread to the outskirts of the capital. On September 9, Spanish reinforcements consisting of two battalions arrived in Puerto Plata. The Spanish garrison of Santiago evacuated Fort San Luis on September 13 and marched toward Puerto Plata. During their three-day march, they were attacked by the Dominicans, resulting in 1,200 Spanish troops killed and wounded. Santana returned and led an army mostly composed of mercenaries against the rebels at Cibao.

On September 14, the insurgents established a provisional government in Santiago led by General José Antonio Salcedo, which declared Santana a traitor and ordered that he be shot on sight. Santana's march stalled at Monte Plata, where rebel forces under General Gregorio Luperón harassed his troops, depleting their strength. The Dominicans captured Santana's entire supply train, along with two Spanish generals and about one hundred Spanish soldiers at Yamasá. Many of Santana's troops deserted, and the Spanish authorities refused to send reinforcements. Santana subsequently withdrew to El Seibo.

The Spanish soldiers in the forts of Puerto Plata and Samaná faced deteriorating conditions. The onset of the rainy season brought widespread sickness. Meanwhile, the Dominicans bombarded Puerto Plata. On October 4, 1863, both the Spaniards and Dominicans pillaged the town. A fight ensued, with 600 Spaniards ultimately driving the Dominicans out of the town, aided by the fort's cannons. In December, a Spanish expedition was launched along the southern seacoast to expel rebel groups weakened by internal conflicts. The Spanish forces drove the rebels from several towns, including Baní, Barahona, Neiba, and San Juan. The capture of Azua resulted in significant Spanish casualties over two months of fighting. Ultimately, the rebels retreated toward Bánica, employing scorched earth tactics and executing Spanish prisoners during their withdrawal. The Captain-General of Santo Domingo, José de la Gándara, adopted a strategy of occupying the northern ports to isolate the dissident Dominican government in Santiago from outside support. However, he overlooked his forces' lack of supplies and poor equipment, as many rifles and cannons were obsolete, and several warships were unseaworthy.

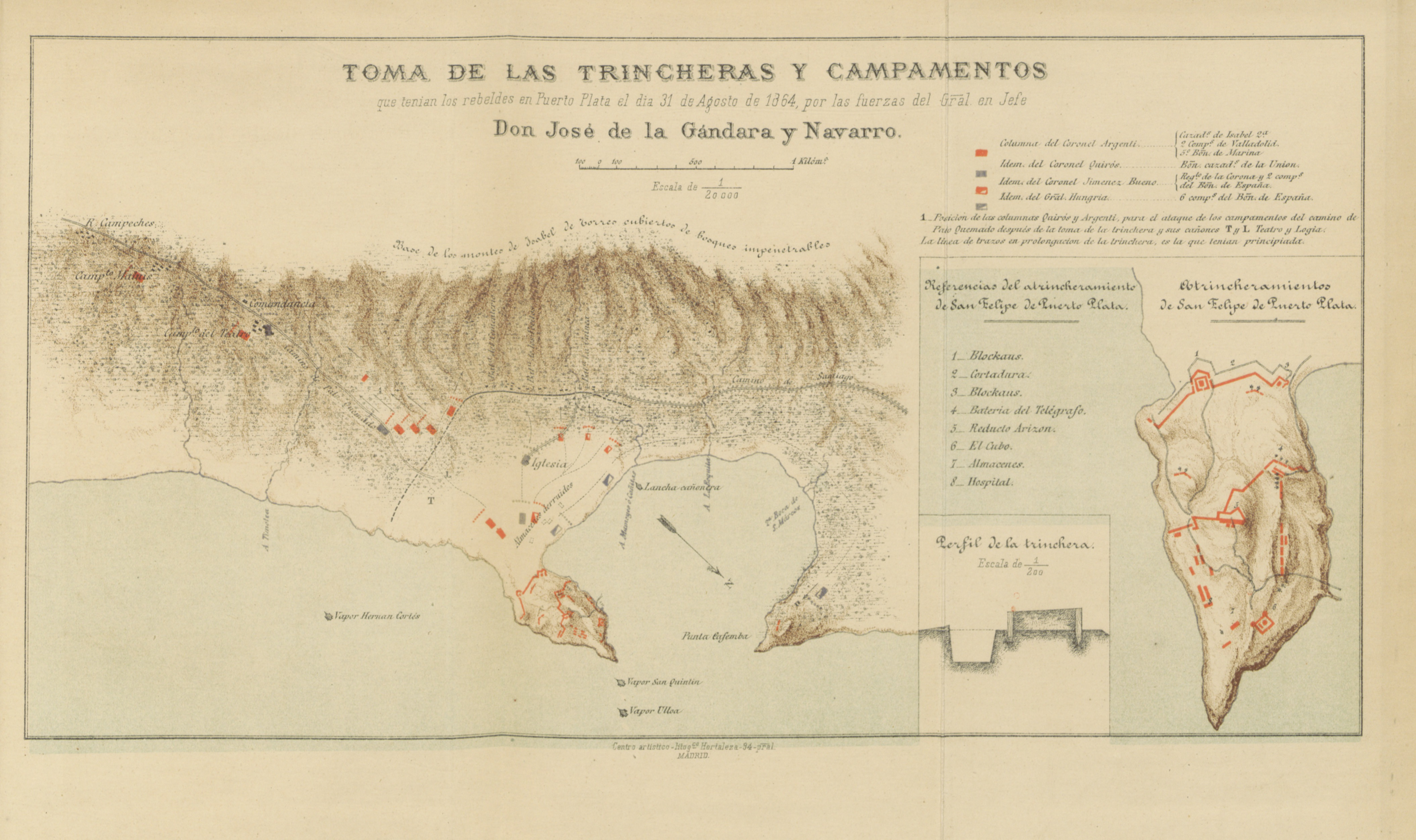
Map of the Spanish capture of Puerto Plata

In May 1864, a 6,000-strong Spanish force captured the town of Monte Cristi on the northern coast, which was fortified with forts and trenches. Next, La Gándara attempted to subdue the rebels between Monte Cristi and Santiago, but the Dominicans resorted to hit-and-run tactics and intercepted many supplies intended for La Gándara. The only victory in the campaign was the capture of Monte Cristi, achieved at the cost of heavy casualties, including the wounding of Field Marshal Primo de Rivera. On August 31, La Gándara cleared Puerto Plata of enemy trenches and camps. On December 4, southern forces led by José María Cabral defeated the Spanish in an engagement at Neiba, marking the first time that the Dominicans achieved victory against the Spanish in a conventional battle.

Confined to the major towns, the Spanish Army was unable to defeat the guerillas or contain the insurrection, and suffered heavy losses due to yellow fever; by the end of the occupation, over 12,000 Spanish troops had died from the disease. Spanish colonial authorities encouraged Queen Isabella II to abandon the island, seeing the occupation as a nonsensical waste of troops and money. However, the rebels were in a state of political disarray and proved unable to present a cohesive set of demands.

In October 1864, the first president of the provisional government, Salcedo (allied with Báez), was assassinated. He had been deposed by General Gaspar Polanco in September 1864, who, in turn, was deposed by General Antonio Pimentel three months later after a failed attack on the Spanish at Monte Cristi. The rebels formalized their provisional rule by holding a national convention in February 1865, which enacted a new constitution, but the new government exerted little authority over the various regional guerrilla caudillos, who were largely independent of one another. Unable to extract concessions from the disorganized rebels, when the American Civil War ended, in March 1865, Queen Isabella annulled the annexation and independence was restored, with the last Spanish troops departing by July.

== Restoration: Second Republic (1865–1916) ==
By the time the Spanish departed, most of the main towns lay in ruins and the island was divided among several dozen caudillos. José María Cabral controlled most of Barahona and the southwest with the support of Báez's mahogany-exporting partners, while cattle rancher Cesáreo Guillermo assembled a coalition of former Santanista generals in the southeast, and Gregorio Luperón controlled the north coast.

From the Spanish withdrawal to 1879, there were twenty-one changes of government and at least fifty military uprisings. In the course of these conflicts, two parties emerged. The Partido Rojo (Literally "Red Party") represented the southern cattle ranching latifundia and mahogany-exporting interests, as well as the artisans and laborers of Santo Domingo, and was dominated by Báez, who continued to seek annexation by a foreign power. The Partido Azul (literally "Blue Party"), led by Luperón, represented the tobacco farmers and merchants of the Cibao and Puerto Plata and was nationalist and liberal in orientation. During these wars, the small and corrupt national army was far outnumbered by militias organized and maintained by local caudillos who set themselves up as provincial governors. These militias were filled out by poor farmers or landless plantation workers impressed into service who usually took up banditry when not fighting in revolution.

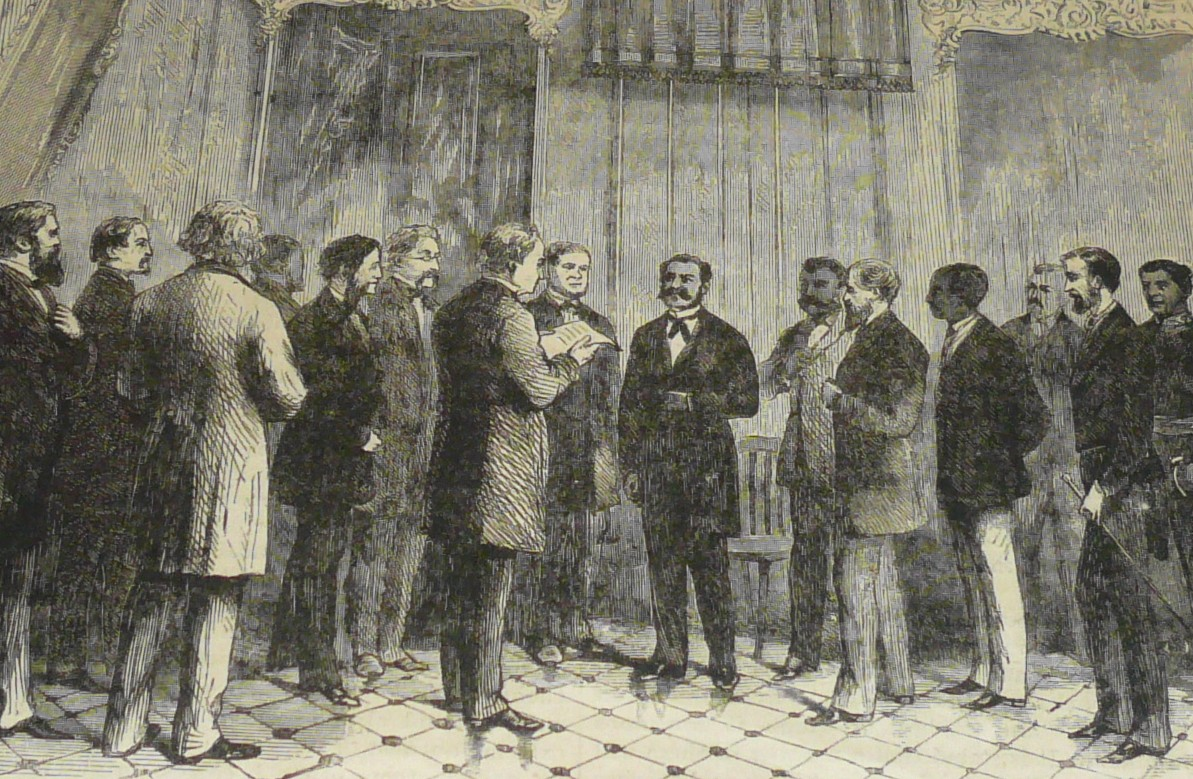
Reception of American commissioners by President Báez, 1871

Within a month of the nationalist victory, Cabral, whose troops were the first to enter Santo Domingo, ousted Pimentel, but a few weeks later General Guillermo led a rebellion in support of Báez, forcing Cabral to resign and allowing Báez to retake the presidency in October. Báez was overthrown by the Cibao farmers under Luperón, leader of the Partido Azul, the following spring, but Luperón's allies turned on each other and Cabral reinstalled himself as president in a coup in 1867. After bringing several Azules ("Blues") into his cabinet the Rojos ("Reds") revolted, returning Báez to power. In 1869, Báez negotiated a treaty of annexation with the United States. Supported by U.S. Secretary of State William H. Seward, who hoped to establish a Navy base at Samaná, in 1871 the treaty was defeated in the United States Senate through the efforts of abolitionist Senator Charles Sumner.

In 1874, the Rojo governor of Puerto Plata, Ignacio Maria González Santín, staged a coup in support of an Azul rebellion but was deposed by the Azules two years later. In February 1876, Ulises Espaillat, backed by Luperón, was named president, but ten months later troops loyal to Báez returned him to power. One year later, a new rebellion allowed González to seize power, only to be deposed by Cesáreo Guillermo in September 1878, who was in turn deposed by Luperón in December 1879. Ruling the country from his hometown of Puerto Plata, enjoying an economic boom due to increased tobacco exports to Germany, Luperón enacted a new constitution setting a two-year presidential term limit and providing for direct elections, suspended the semi-formal system of bribes and initiated construction on the nation's first railroad, linking the town of La Vega with the port of Sánchez on Samaná Bay.

The Ten Years' War in Cuba brought Cuban sugar planters to the country in search of new lands and security from the insurrection that freed their slaves and destroyed their property. Most settled in the southeastern coastal plain, and, with assistance from Luperón's government, built the nation's first mechanized sugar mills. They were later joined by Italians, Germans, Puerto Ricans and Americans in forming the nucleus of the Dominican sugar bourgeoisie, marrying into prominent families to solidify their social position. Disruptions in global production caused by the Ten Years' War, the American Civil War and the Franco-Prussian War allowed the Dominican Republic to become a major sugar exporter. Over the following two decades, sugar surpassed tobacco as the leading export, with the former fishing hamlets of San Pedro de Macorís and La Romana transformed into thriving ports. To meet their need for better transportation, over 300 miles of private rail-lines were built by and serving the sugar plantations by 1897.

An 1884 slump in prices led to a wage freeze, and a subsequent labor shortage was filled by migrant workers from the Leeward Islands—the Virgin Islands, St. Kitts and Nevis, Anguilla, and Antigua (referred to by Dominicans as cocolos). These English-speaking black immigrants were often victims of racism, but many remained in the country, finding work as stevedores and in railroad construction and sugar refineries.

=== Ulises Heureaux and political intervention by the U.S. ===
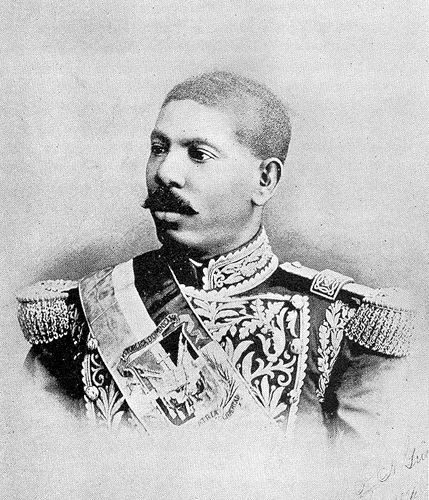
Ulises Heureaux

Allying with the emerging sugar interests, the dictatorship of General Ulises Heureaux, who was popularly known as Lilís, brought unprecedented stability to the island through an iron-fisted rule that lasted almost two decades. The son of a Haitian father and a mother from St. Thomas, Virgin Islands, Lilís was distinguished by his blackness from most Dominican political leaders, with the exception of Luperón. He served as President 1882–1883, 1887, and 1889–1899, wielding power through a series of puppet presidents when not occupying the office. Incorporating both Rojos and Azules into his government, he developed an extensive network of spies and informants to crush potential opposition. His government undertook a number of major infrastructure projects, including the electrification of Santo Domingo, the beginning of telephone and telegraph service, the construction of a bridge over the Ozama River, and the completion of a single-track railroad linking Santiago and Puerto Plata, financed by the Amsterdam-based Westendorp Co.

Lilís's dictatorship was dependent upon heavy borrowing from European and American banks to enrich himself, stabilize the existing debt, strengthen the bribe system, pay for the army, finance infrastructural development and help set up sugar mills. However, sugar prices underwent a steep decline in the last two decades of the 19th century. When the Westendorp Co. went bankrupt in 1893, he was forced to mortgage the nation's customs fees, the main source of government revenues, to a New York financial firm called the San Domingo Improvement Co. (SDIC), which took over its railroad contracts and the claims of its European bondholders in exchange for two loans, one of $1.2 million and the other of £2 million.

As the growing public debt made it impossible to maintain his political machine, Heureaux relied on secret loans from the SDIC, sugar planters and local merchants. In 1897, with his government virtually bankrupt, Lilís printed five million uninsured pesos, known as papeletas de Lilís, ruining most Dominican merchants and inspiring a conspiracy that ended in his death. In 1899, when Lilís was assassinated by the Cibao tobacco merchants whom he had been begging for a loan, the national debt was over $35 million, fifteen times the annual budget.

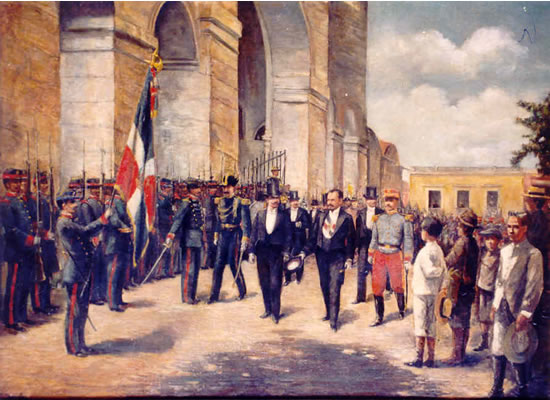
President Alejandro Woss y Gil taking office in 1903.

The six years after Lilís's death witnessed four revolutions and five different presidents. The Cibao politicians who had conspired against Heureaux—Juan Isidro Jimenes, the nation's wealthiest tobacco planter, and General Horacio Vásquez—after being named president and vice-president, quickly fell out over the division of spoils among their supporters, the Jimenistas and Horacistas. Troops loyal to Vásquez overthrew Jimenes in 1903, but Vásquez was deposed by Jimenista General Alejandro Woss y Gil, who seized power for himself. The Jimenistas toppled his government, but their leader, Carlos Morales, refused to return power to Jimenes, allying with the Horacistas, and he soon faced a new revolt by his betrayed Jimenista allies. During the revolt, American warships bombarded insurgents in Santo Domingo after they insulted the United States flag and killed a U.S. Navy sailor.

The Dominican Republic owed debts to Belgium, France, Germany, Italy, Great Britain, and the United States, particularly the latter two. With the nation on the brink of defaulting, France, Germany, Italy and Great Britain sent warships to Santo Domingo to press the claims of their nationals. In order to preempt military intervention, United States president Theodore Roosevelt introduced the Roosevelt Corollary to the Monroe Doctrine, declaring that the United States would assume responsibility for ensuring that the nations of Latin America met their financial obligations.

In January 1905, under this corollary, the United States assumed administration of the Dominican Republic's customs. Under the terms of this agreement, a Receiver-General, appointed by the U.S. president, kept 55% of total revenues to pay off foreign claimants, while remitting 45% to the Dominican government. After two years, the nation's external debt was reduced from $40 million to $17 million. In 1907, this agreement was converted into a treaty, transferring control over customs receivership to the U.S. Bureau of Insular Affairs and providing a loan of $20 million from a New York bank as payment for outstanding claims, making the United States the Dominican Republic's only foreign creditor. In 1905, the Dominican Peso was replaced by the U.S. Dollar.

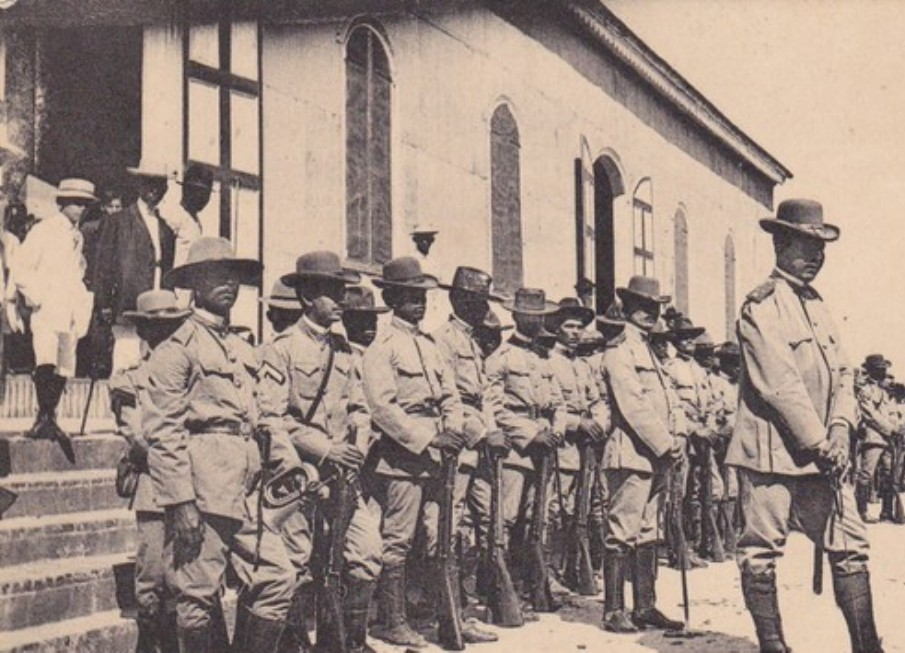
The Guardia republicana, set up by President Cáceres in 1907

In 1906, Morales resigned, and Horacista vice-president Ramón Cáceres became president. After suppressing a rebellion in the northwest by Jimenista General Desiderio Arias, his government brought political stability and renewed economic growth, aided by new American investment in the sugar industry. However, his assassination in 1911, for which Morales and Arias were at least indirectly responsible, once again plunged the republic into chaos. For two months, executive power was held by a civilian junta dominated by the chief of the army, General Alfredo Victoria. The surplus of more than 4 million pesos left by Cáceres was quickly spent to suppress a series of insurrections. He forced Congress to elect his uncle, Eladio Victoria, as president, but the latter was soon replaced by the neutral Archbishop Adolfo Nouel. After four months, Nouel resigned and was succeeded by Horacista Congressman José Bordas Valdez, who aligned with Arias and the Jimenistas to maintain power.

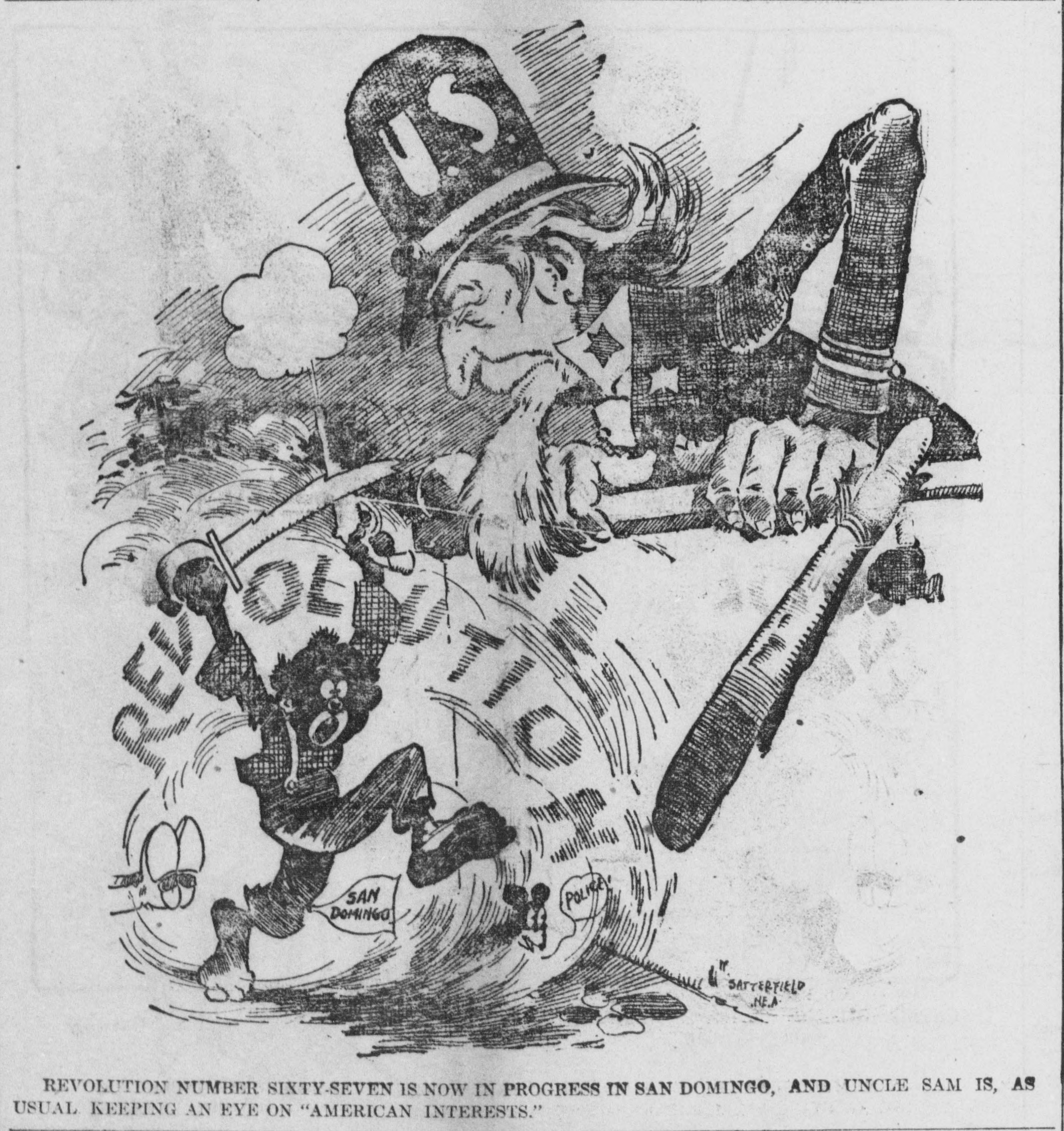
Cartoon about constant revolutions in the Dominican Republic

In 1913, Vásquez returned from exile in Puerto Rico to lead a new rebellion. On August 30, 1914, General Vidal, leader of the revolutionists, disbanded his forces on orders from Captain Edward Eberle, the senior U.S. naval officer in Dominican waters. An American commission, backed by a large naval force including USS Hancock with the Fifth Marines under Colonel Charles A. Doyen, ended the revolution. After the provisional presidency of Ramón Báez, Jimenes was elected in October, and soon faced new demands, including the appointment of an American director of public works and financial advisor and the creation of a new military force commanded by U.S. officers. The Dominican Congress rejected these demands and began impeachment proceedings against Jimenes.

The United States occupied Haiti in July 1915, with the implicit threat that the Dominican Republic might be next. Jimenes's Minister of War Desiderio Arias staged a coup d'état in April 1916, providing a pretext for the United States to occupy the Dominican Republic.

== United States occupation (1916–24) ==
=== Conventional campaign ===
U.S. occupation of the Dominican Republic
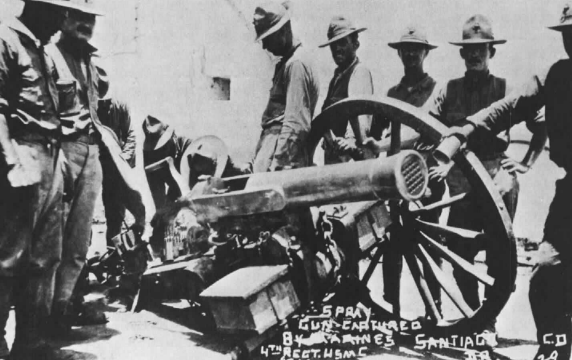
- 4th Marine Regiment with a captured rebel "spray gun" at Santiago
Date	May 5, 1916 – September 18, 1924 (8 years, 4 months, 1 week and 6 days)
Location	Dominican Republic
Result	Establishment of a military government under the U.S. Navy and Marine Corps

Belligerents
(Dominican Republic) Dominican rebels	United States

Commanders and leaders
(Dominican Republic) Desiderio Arias; (Dominican Republic) Juan Pérez	(United States) William B. Caperton; (United States) Harry Knapp; (United States) Thomas Snowden; (United States) Joseph Henry Pendleton; (United States) Ernest Calvin Williams; (United States) Holland Smith

Strength
1,000 militia (1916)	1,800 Marines (1916)

Casualties and losses
950 killed or wounded	144 Marines killed, 50 wounded; 244 sailors dead or injured; 27 national police killed, 47 wounded

United States Marines landed in Santo Domingo on May 5, 1916, and seized Fort San Gerónimo. Jimenes resigned on May 7 rather than comply with U.S. demands for more political and economic control. On May 13, Rear Admiral William B. Caperton demanded that Arias, entrenched in Fort Ozama, disband his army and surrender his weapons, but Arias and his supporters chose to leave the city rather than comply. On June 1, following a bombardment, Marines occupied Monte Cristi and Puerto Plata. The Marines faced opposition at the second port from supporters of General Arias and fought their way ashore, capturing Fort San Felipe.

On June 26, a column of Marines under Colonel Joseph H. Pendleton marched from Monte Cristi toward Arias's stronghold in Santiago. The following day, the column encountered a strong defensive position on Las Trencheras Ridge. Supported by artillery, the Marines attacked and overran the position. The rebels fell back to a second defensive line but could not hold that either. A week later, 400 Marines encountered another entrenched rebel force of 300 at Guayacanas, where the rebels maintained single-shot fire against the Marines' automatic weapons before being driven off. U.S. losses were 1 killed and 8 wounded; rebel losses were estimated at several score killed and wounded, including their leader, Maximito Cabral, who was killed fighting in the trenches.

On July 5, a peace delegation from Santiago met with the Marines and handed over the city, while General Arias surrendered to the Dominican governor of Santiago. The U.S. then extended the occupation to the inland cities of Moca and La Vega. During the conventional campaign, 7 Marines were killed and 15 wounded, while the rebels suffered between 100 and 300 casualties.

=== Occupation ===
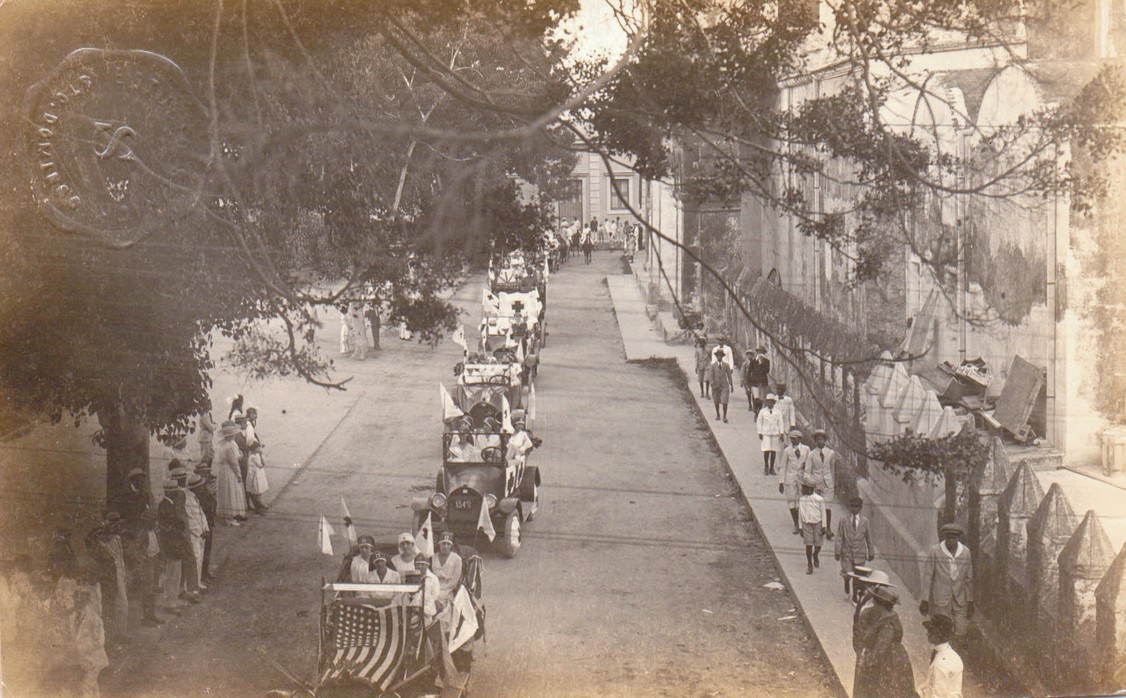
American Red Cross convoy in Santo Domingo, Dominican Republic, in 1916.

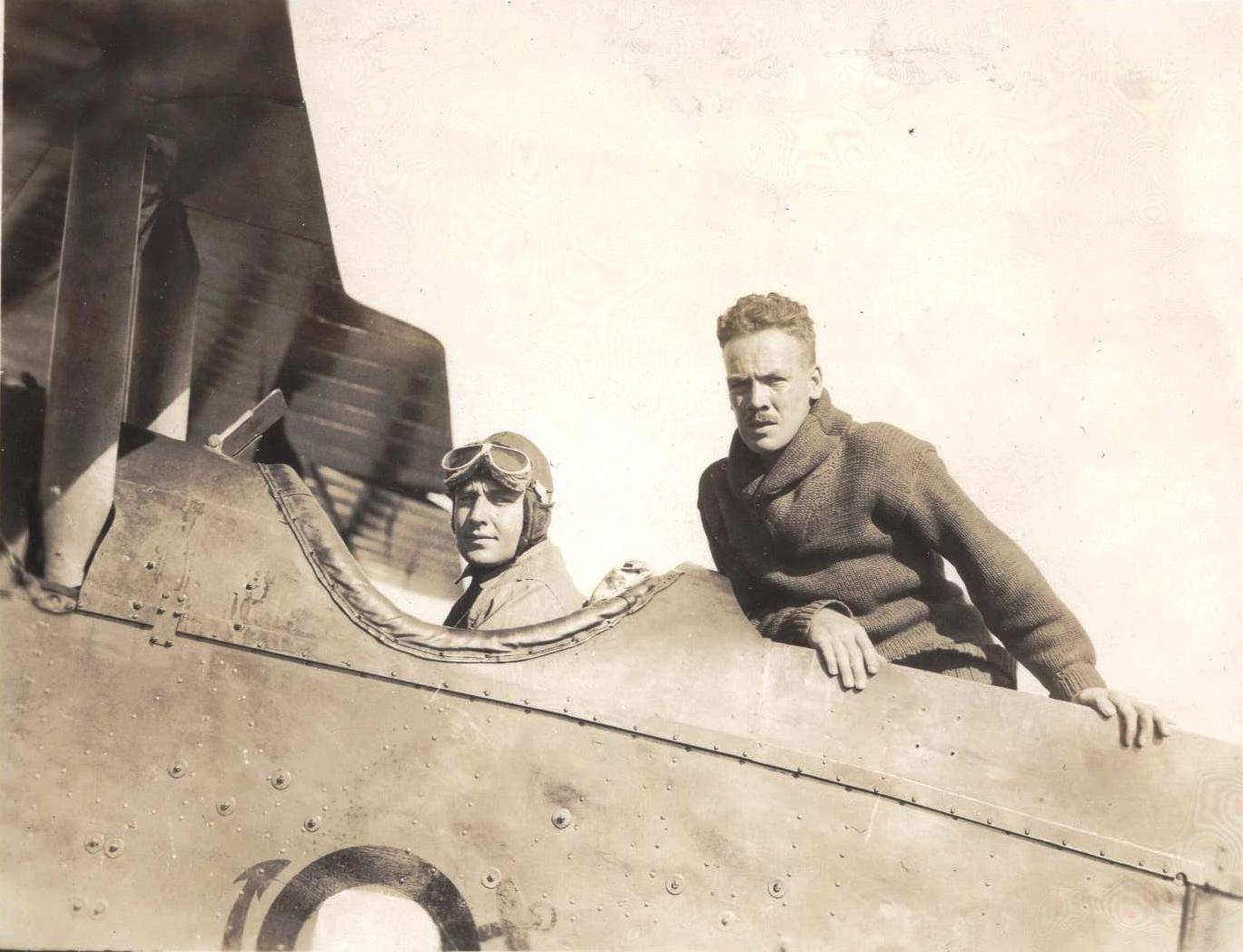
Marine Aviators in the Dominican Republic, 1919

The Dominican Congress elected Dr. Francisco Henríquez y Carvajal as president, but in November, after he refused to meet the U.S. demands, Wilson announced the imposition of a U.S. military government, with Rear Admiral Harry Shepard Knapp as Military Governor.

At San Francisco de Macorís, Governor Juan Pérez, a supporter of Arias, refused to recognize the U.S. military government. Using released prisoners, he prepared to defend the old Spanish fort. On November 29, U.S. Marine Lt. Ernest C. Williams, whose detachment was billeted in San Francisco, charged the closing gates of the fort at nightfall with twelve Marines. Eight were shot down; the others, including Williams, forced their way in and seized the old structure. Another Marine detachment seized the police station, and reinforcements soon suppressed the uprising.

The American military government implemented many of the institutional reforms carried out in the United States during the Progressive Era, including reorganization of the tax system, accounting and administration, expansion of primary education, the creation of a nationwide police force to unify the country, and the construction of a national system of roads, including a highway linking Santiago to Santo Domingo.

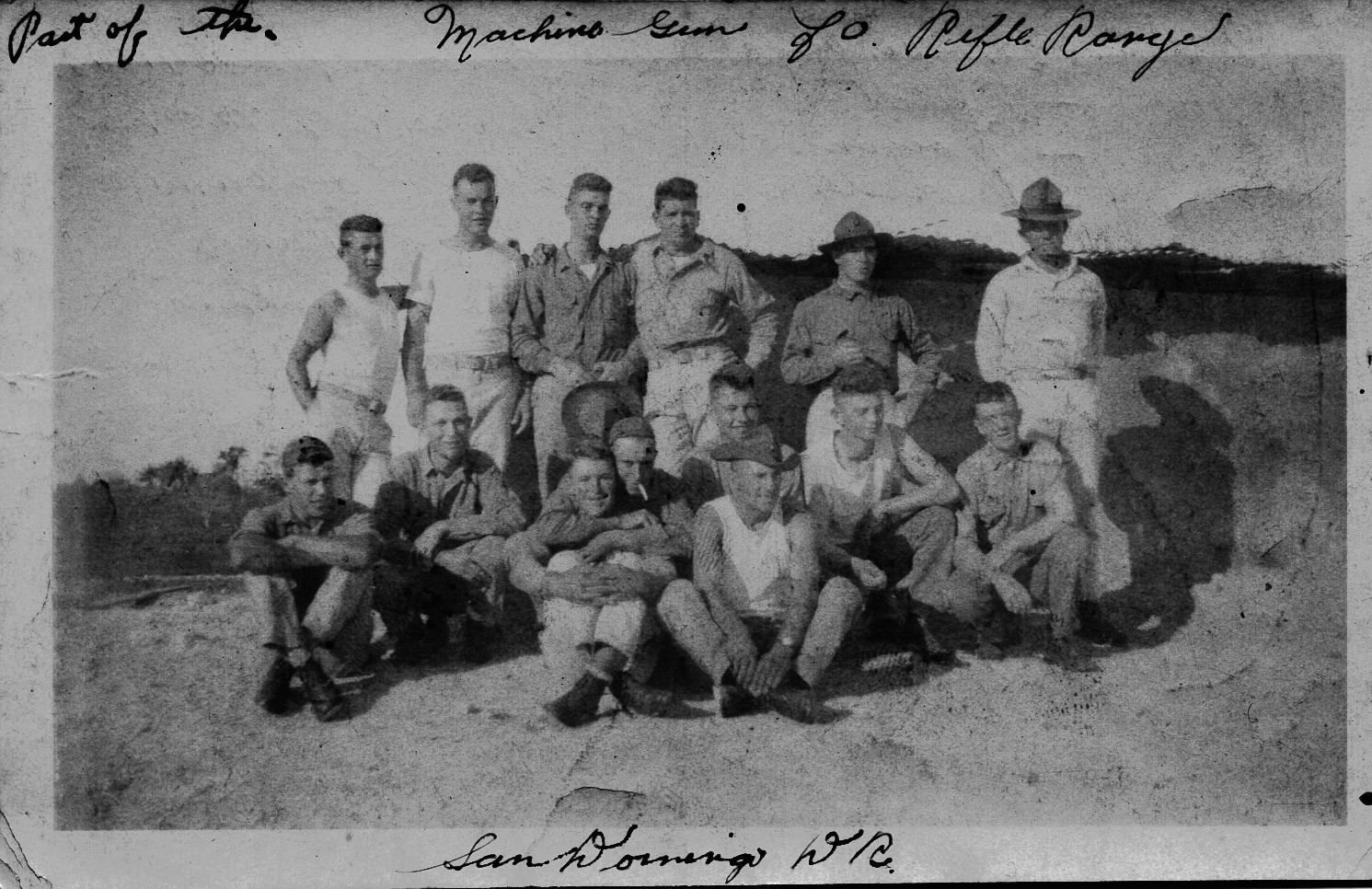
Marine machine gun unit in Santo Domingo, Dominican Republic

The military government, unable to win the backing of any prominent Dominican political leaders, imposed strict censorship laws and imprisoned critics of the occupation. In 1920, U.S. authorities enacted a Land Registration Act, which broke up the terrenos comuneros and dispossessed thousands of peasants who lacked formal titles to the lands they occupied, while legalizing false titles held by the sugar companies.

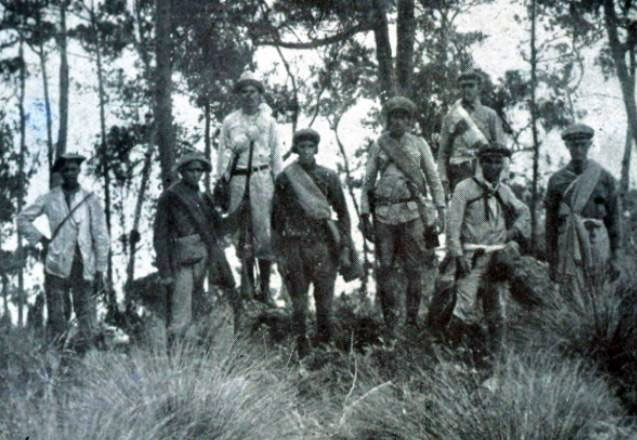
A group of peasant guerillas, known as gavilleros, who fought against the U.S. Marine occupation of the Dominican Republic

In the southeast, dispossessed peasants formed armed bands, called gavilleros, engaging in guerrilla warfare for years in Hato Mayor and El Seibo. At any given time, the Marines faced eight to twelve such bands each composed of several hundred followers. The guerrillas benefited from a superior knowledge of the terrain and the support of the local population, and the Marines relied on superior firepower. However, rivalries between various gavilleros often led them to fight against one another, and even cooperate with occupation authorities. In addition, cultural schisms between the campesinos (i.e. rural people, or peasants) and city dwellers prevented the guerrillas from cooperating with the urban middle-class nationalist movement.

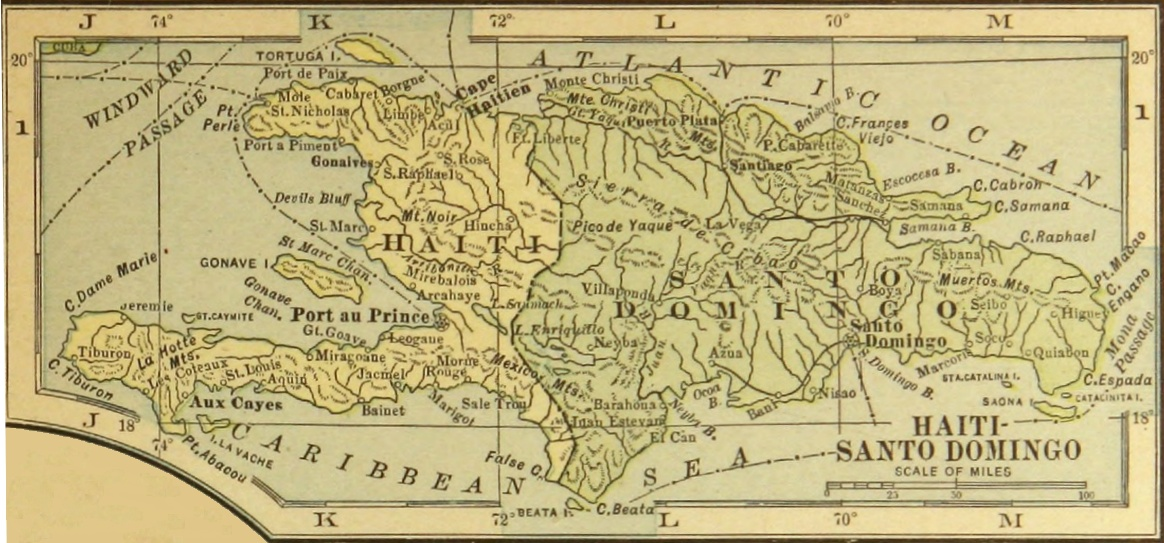
Map of the Dominican Republic (Santo Domingo) and Haiti in 1921

In what was referred to as la danza de los millones, with the destruction of European sugar-beet farms during World War I, sugar prices rose to their highest level in history, from $5.50 in 1914 to $22.50 per pound in 1920. Dominican sugar exports increased from 122,642 tons in 1916 to 158,803 tons in 1920, earning a record $45.3 million. However, European beet sugar production quickly recovered, which, coupled with the growth of global sugar cane production, glutted the world market, causing prices to plummet to only $2.00 by the end of 1921. This crisis drove many of the local sugar planters into bankruptcy, allowing large U.S. conglomerates to dominate the sugar industry. By 1926, only twenty-one major estates remained, occupying an estimated 520,000 acres (2,100 km^{2}). Of these, twelve U.S.-owned companies owned more than 81% of this total area. While the foreign planters who had built the sugar industry integrated into Dominican society, these corporations expatriated their profits to the United States. As prices declined, sugar estates increasingly relied on Haitian laborers. This was facilitated by the military government's introduction of regulated contract labor, the growth of sugar production in the southwest, near the Haitian border, and a series of strikes by cocolo cane cutters organized by the Universal Negro Improvement Association.

=== Withdrawal ===
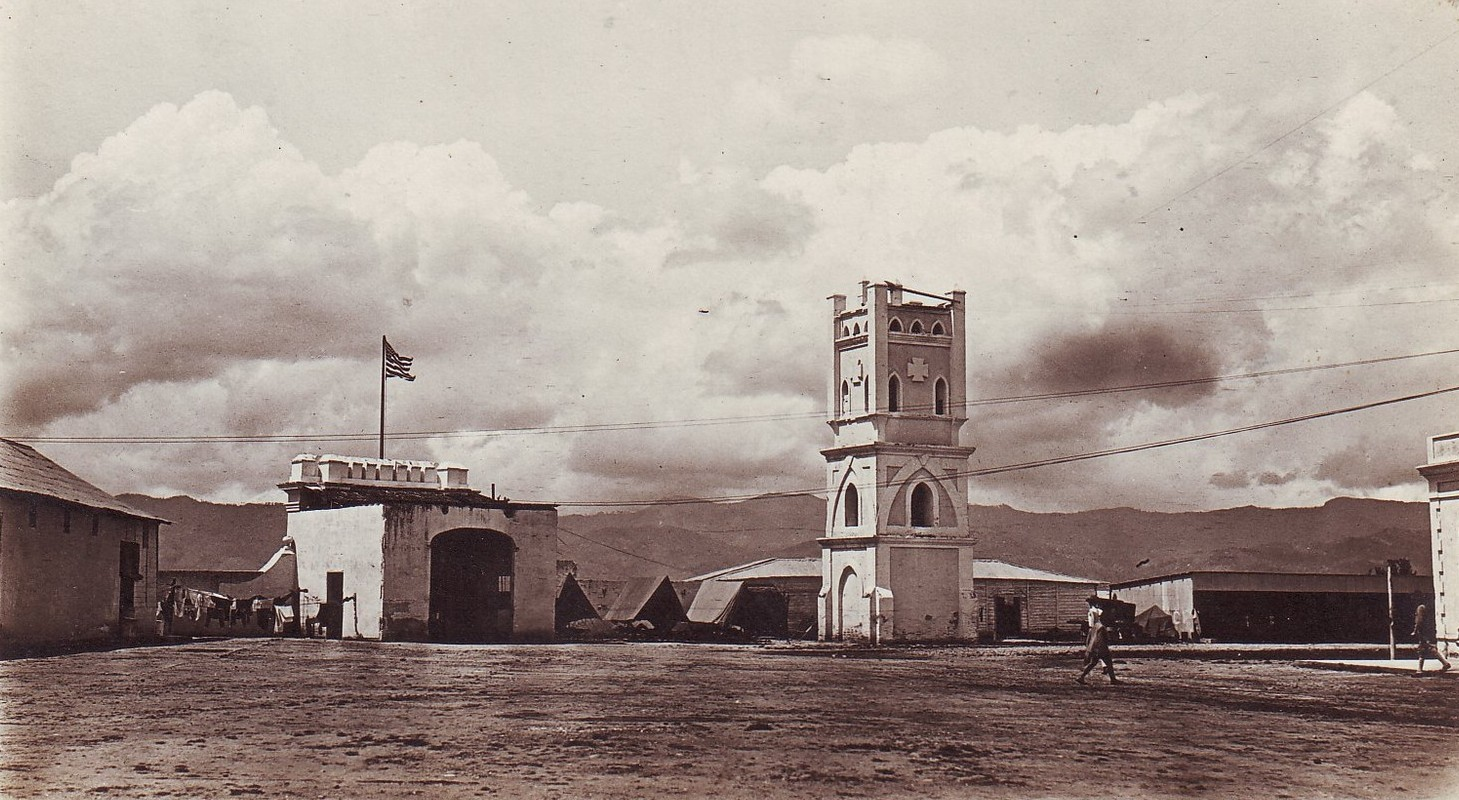
Camp of US Marines in the Dominican Republic during the occupation. Fortaleza San Luis (Santiago de los Caballeros)

In the 1920 United States presidential election Republican candidate Warren Harding criticized the occupation and promised eventual U.S. withdrawal. While Jimenes and Vásquez sought concessions from the United States, the collapse of sugar prices discredited the military government and gave rise to a new nationalist political organization, the Dominican National Union, led by Dr. Henríquez from exile in Santiago de Cuba, Cuba, which demanded unconditional withdrawal. They formed alliances with frustrated nationalists in Puerto Rico and Cuba, as well as critics of the occupation in the United States itself, most notably The Nation and the Haiti-San Domingo Independence Society. In May 1922, a Dominican lawyer, Francisco Peynado, went to Washington, D.C. and negotiated what became known as the Hughes–Peynado Plan. It stipulated the immediate establishment of a provisional government pending elections, approval of all laws enacted by the U.S. military government, and the continuation of the 1907 treaty until all the Dominican Republic's foreign debts had been settled. On October 1, Juan Bautista Vicini, the son of a wealthy Italian immigrant sugar planter, was named provisional president, and the process of U.S. withdrawal began.

By the time U.S. forces withdrew on September 18, 1924, 144 Marines had been killed in action. Forty U.S. sailors died separately when a hurricane wrecked their armored cruiser on Santo Domingo's rocky shore. The principal legacy of the occupation was the creation of a National Police Force, used by the Marines to help fight against the various guerrillas, and later the main vehicle for the rise of Rafael Trujillo. The National Police claimed 320 guerrillas killed or wounded, while suffering 27 killed and 47 wounded. In mid-1922, the 2d Brigade commander reported 1,137 guerrillas killed or wounded, against Marine losses of 20 killed and 67 wounded.

Marine personnel strength in the Dominican Republic, 1916–24
Month	Year	Personnel
May	1916	632
November	1916	2,219
May	1917	1,683
June	1918	1,635
October	1918	1,964
February	1919	3,007
December	1919	1,970
March	1920	1,838
November	1920	2,267
July	1921	2,323
October	1921	2,811
January	1922	2,576
November	1922	2,189
February	1923	2,305
May	1923	1,946
March	1924	2,076
July	1924	890
September	1924	133
October	1924	0

== The rise and fall of Trujillo: Third Republic (1924–65) ==
=== Horacio Vásquez 1924–1930 ===
The occupation ended in 1924, with a democratically elected government under president Vásquez. The Vásquez administration brought great social and economic prosperity to the country and respected political and civil rights. Rising export commodity prices and government borrowing allowed the funding of public works projects and the expansion and modernization of Santo Domingo.

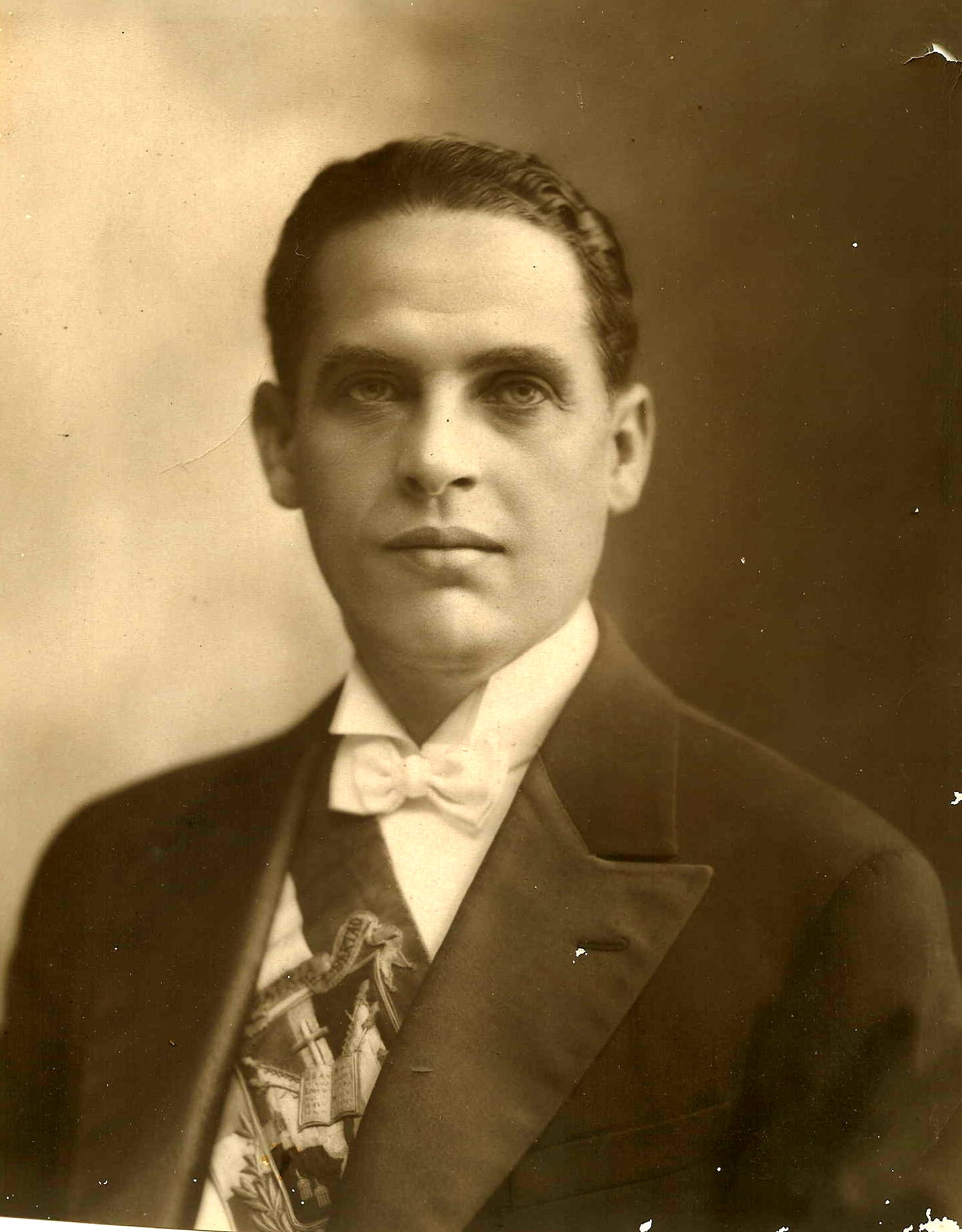
Rafael Estrella

Though considered to be a relatively principled man, Vásquez had risen amid many years of political infighting. In a move directed against his chief opponent Federico Velasquez, in 1927 Vásquez agreed to have his term extended from four to six years. The change was approved by the Dominican Congress, but was of debatable legality; "its enactment effectively invalidated the constitution of 1924 that Vásquez had previously sworn to uphold." Vásquez also removed the prohibition against presidential reelection and postulated himself for another term in elections to be held in May 1930. However, his actions had by then led to doubts that the contest could be fair. Furthermore, these elections took place amid economic problems, as the Great Depression had dropped sugar prices to less than one dollar per pound.

In February, a revolution was proclaimed in Santiago by a lawyer named Rafael Estrella Ureña. When the commander of the Guardia Nacional Dominicana (the new designation of the armed force created under the Occupation), Rafael Leonidas Trujillo Molina, ordered his troops to remain in their barracks, the sick and aging Vásquez was forced into exile and Estrella proclaimed provisional president. In May, Trujillo was elected with 95% of the vote, having used the army to harass and intimidate electoral personnel and potential opponents. After his inauguration in August, at his request, the Dominican Congress proclaimed the beginning of the 'Era of Trujillo'.

=== The era of Trujillo 1931–1961 ===
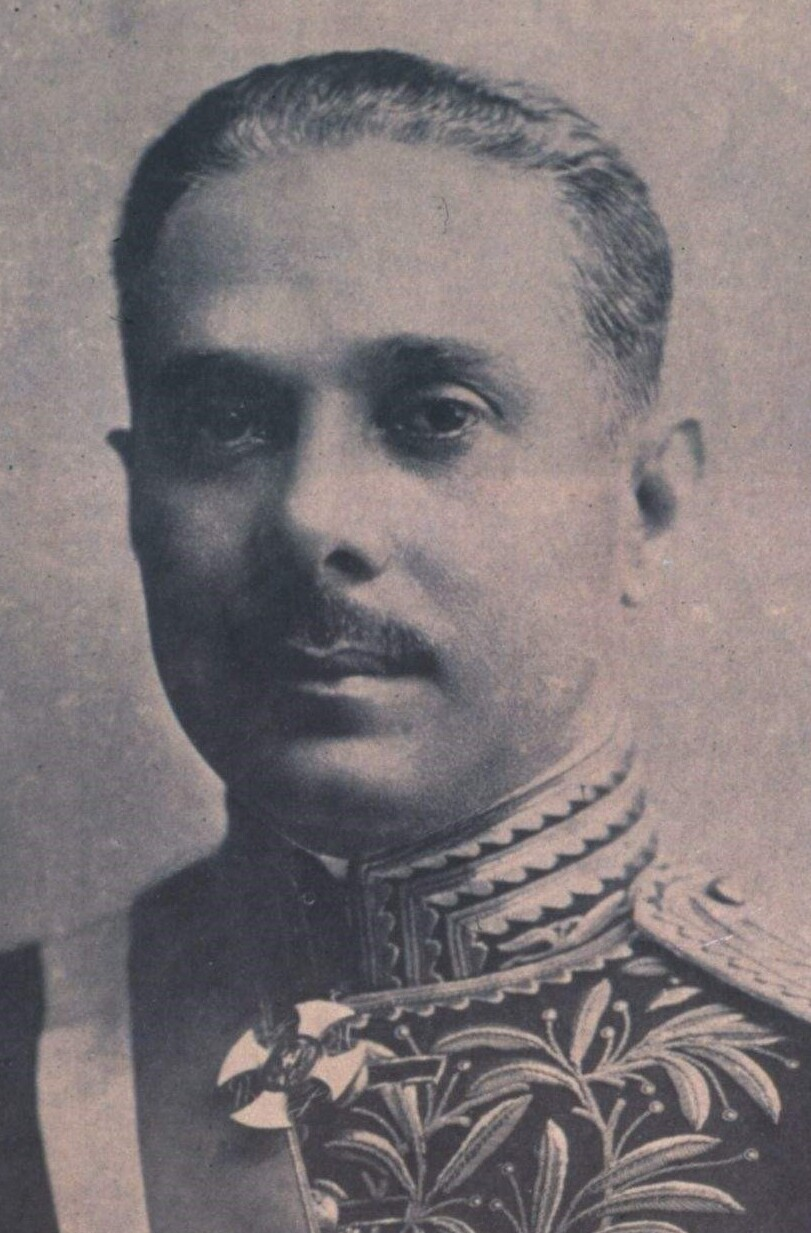
Rafael Trujillo

Trujillo established absolute political control while promoting economic development—from which mainly he and his supporters benefitted—and severe repression of domestic human rights. Trujillo treated his political party, El Partido Dominicano (The Dominican Party), as a rubber-stamp for his decisions. The true source of his power was the Guardia Nacional—larger, better armed, and more centrally controlled than any military force in the nation's history. By disbanding the regional militias, the Marines eliminated the main source of potential opposition, giving the Guard "a virtual monopoly on power". By 1940, Dominican military spending was 21% of the national budget. At the same time, he developed an elaborate system of espionage agencies. By the late 1950s, there were at least seven categories of intelligence agencies, spying on each other as well as the public. All citizens were required to carry identification cards and good-conduct passes from the secret police.

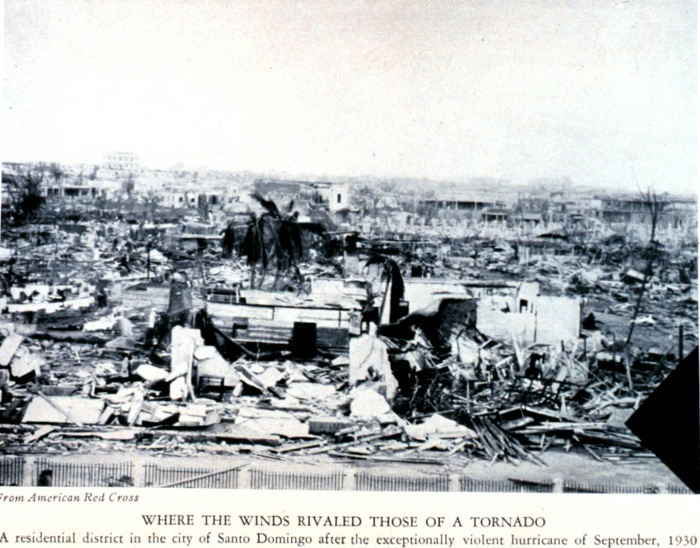
Destruction of Santo Domingo after the 1930 hurricane

Obsessed with adulation, Trujillo promoted an extravagant cult of personality. When a hurricane struck Santo Domingo in 1930, killing 8,000 people, he rebuilt the city and renamed it Ciudad Trujillo: "Trujillo City"; he also renamed the country's and the Caribbean's highest mountain, Pico Duarte (Duarte Peak), Pico Trujillo. Over 1,800 statues of Trujillo were built, and all public works projects were required to have a plaque with the inscription "Era of Trujillo, Benefactor of the Fatherland".

As sugar estates turned to Haiti for seasonal migrant labor, increasing numbers settled in the Dominican Republic permanently. The census of 1920, conducted by the U.S. occupation government, gave a total of 28,258 Haitians living in the country; by 1935 there were 52,657. In October 1937, Trujillo ordered the massacre of an estimated 17,000 to 35,000 Haitian men, women, and children living in the border region of the Dominican Republic. Over the course of five days, Dominican troops killed Haitians with guns, machetes, clubs, and knives. The massacre was the result of a new policy which Trujillo called the 'Dominicanisation of the frontier'. Place names along the border were changed from Creole and French to Spanish, the practice of Voodoo was outlawed, quotas were imposed on the percentage of foreign workers that companies could hire, and a law was passed preventing Haitian workers from remaining after the sugar harvest.

Although Trujillo sought to emulate Generalissimo Francisco Franco, he welcomed Spanish Republican refugees following the Spanish Civil War. During the Holocaust in the Second World War, the Dominican Republic took in many Jews fleeing Hitler who had been refused entry by other countries. The Jews settled in Sosua. These decisions arose from a policy of blanquismo, closely connected with anti-Haitian xenophobia, which sought to add more light-skinned individuals to the Dominican population by promoting immigration from Europe. As part of the Good Neighbor policy, in 1940, the U.S. State Department signed a treaty with Trujillo relinquishing control over the nation's customs.

When the Japanese attacked Pearl Harbor, Trujillo followed the United States in declaring war on the Axis powers, although the Dominican Republic did not have any participation in the war. Nazi submarines operating in the Caribbean torpedoed and sank two Dominican merchant vessels that Trujillo had named after himself—the steamers San Rafael and Presidente Trujillo, killing twenty-six Dominican sailors. Nazi submarines also destroyed four Dominican schooners. After the war, Trujillo sought military aid from the United States but was denied. Trujillo decided to establish his own arms factory. This move allowed the Dominican Republic to become self-sufficient in producing firearms. In the 1950s, Trujillo's air force had 156 aircraft, including fighters, B-17 bombers, and B-26 Marauder bombers. His navy comprised two English-built destroyers, two U.S.-built frigates, and five Canadian corvettes, all of World War II vintage. During the Cold War, he maintained close ties to the United States, declaring himself the world's "Number One Anticommunist" and becoming the first Latin American President to sign a Mutual Defense Assistance Agreement with the United States.

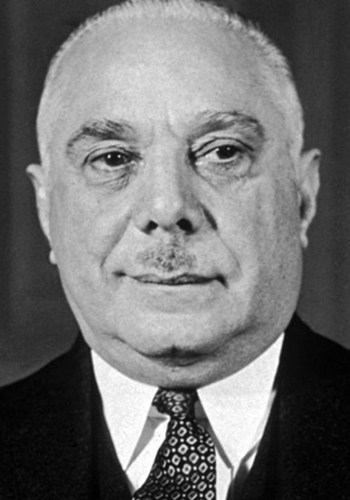
Rafael Trujillo in 1952

Trujillo and his family established a near-monopoly over the national economy. By the time of his death, he had accumulated a fortune of around $800 million ($8.2 billion in today's money); he and his family owned 50–60% of the arable land, some 700,000 acres (2,800 km^{2}), and Trujillo-owned businesses accounted for 80% of the commercial activity in the capital. He exploited nationalist sentiment to purchase most of the nation's sugar plantations and refineries from U.S. corporations; operated monopolies on salt, rice, milk, cement, tobacco, coffee, and insurance; owned two large banks, several hotels, port facilities, an airline and shipping line; deducted 10% of all public employees' salaries (ostensibly for his party); and received a portion of prostitution revenues.

World War II brought increased demand for Dominican exports, and the 1940s and early 1950s witnessed economic growth and considerable expansion of the national infrastructure. During this period, the capital city was transformed from merely an administrative center to the national center of shipping and industry, although "it was hardly coincidental that new roads often led to Trujillo's plantations and factories, and new harbors benefited Trujillo's shipping and export enterprises." Mismanagement and corruption resulted in major economic problems. By the end of the 1950s, the economy was deteriorating because of a combination of overspending on a festival to celebrate the 25th anniversary of the regime, overspending to purchase privately owned sugar mills and electricity plants, and a decision to make a major investment in state sugar production that proved economically unsuccessful.

On June 14, 1959, Dominican exiles, sponsored by the Cuban government, launched an invasion of the Dominican Republic from Cuba, landing by plane at Constanza, where they were quickly defeated by the Anti-Communist Foreign Legion of the Caribbean. A week later, another group of invaders offloaded into launches from two yachts on the north coast, where Dominican-manned aircraft fired rockets at the boats, killing most of the invaders. A few survivors managed to swim to the shore and escape into the forest, but the military employed napalm to flush them out. Of a count of 224 invaders, 217 were killed and seven captured. The leaders of the invasion were taken aboard a Dominican Air Force plane and then pushed out in mid-air, falling to their deaths. The invasion force consisted of Dominicans, Cubans, Venezuelans, Spaniards, Guatemalans, and Americans. In October 1960, Trujillo supported 1,000 Cuban insurgents in the Escambray Rebellion, but they were defeated by the Cuban government.

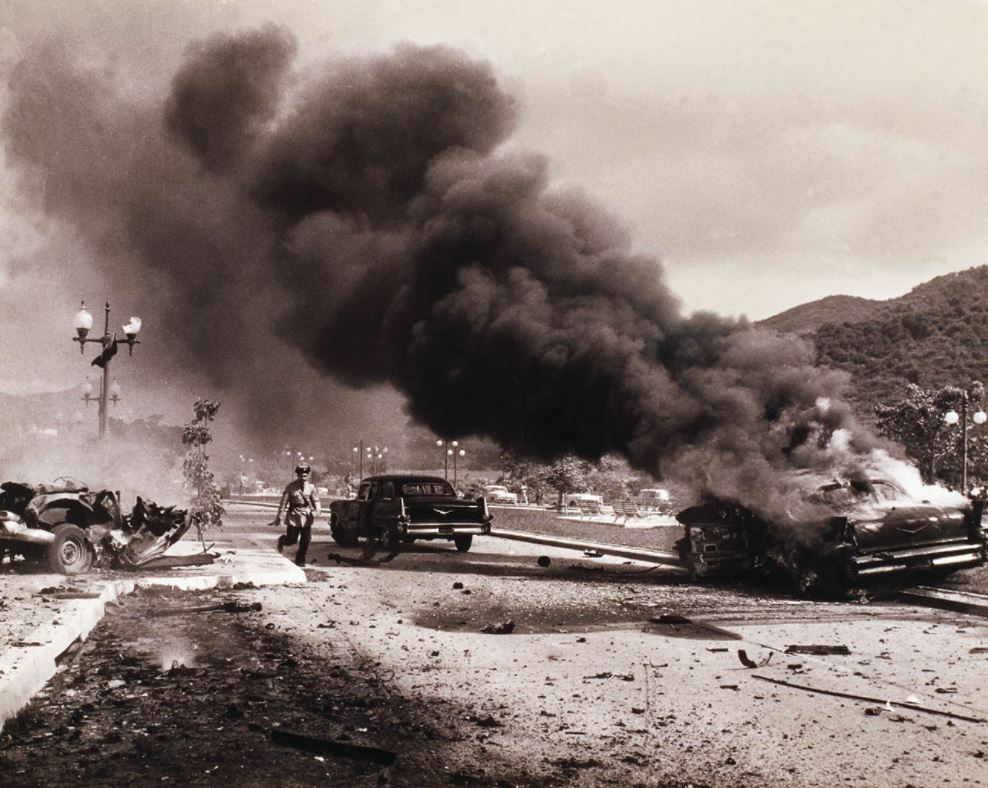
Assassination attempt on Venezuela's president orchestrated by Johnny Abbes (June 24, 1960)

In 1957, Trujillo created the S.I.M. (Military Intelligence Service), a secret police and death squad, headed by Johnny Abbes, which carried out covert operations and assassinations abroad. On June 24, 1960, as Venezuelan president Rómulo Betancourt was en route to preside over a military parade in Caracas, conspirators detonated 60 lbs. of explosives packed into two suitcases within a parked car nearby; Betancourt was injured, and Colonel Ramón Armas Perez, the chauffeur, and a bystander were killed. Investigation revealed that the ammonium nitrate bomb had been assembled in Ciudad Trujillo and that the operation was orchestrated by Abbes. In August 1960, the Organization of American States (OAS) imposed economic sanctions against the Dominican Republic as a result of Trujillo's complicity in the nearly successful assassination attempt.

The United States broke diplomatic relations with the Dominican Republic on August 26, 1960, and in January 1961 suspended the export of trucks, parts, crude oil, gasoline and other petroleum products. U.S. President Dwight D. Eisenhower also took advantage of OAS sanctions to cut drastically purchases of Dominican sugar. This action ultimately cost the Dominican Republic almost $22,000,000 in lost revenues at a time when its economy was in a rapid decline. Trujillo threatened to align with the Communist world in response to U.S. and Latin American rejection of his regime. La Voz Dominicana and Radio Caribe began attacking the U.S. in Marxian terms, and the Dominican Communist Party was legalized. The United States government enlisted the CIA to devise a plan to kill Trujillo.

A group of Dominican dissidents killed Trujillo in a car chase on the way to his country villa near San Cristóbal on May 30, 1961. The group, led by General Juan Tomás Díaz Quezada, fired nearly thirty bullets into Trujillo's blue 1957 Chevrolet Bel Air. Trujillo's chauffeur attempted to return fire with a machine gun. Badly wounded, Trujillo exited the car, searching for the assassins, and was shot dead on the spot. The sanctions remained in force after Trujillo's assassination. His son Ramfis took charge and rounded up the conspirators, who were executed. Among the victims was General René Román Fernández, secretary of the armed forces and an in-law of Trujillo, who was tortured in the electric chair before being executed with a submachine gun.

In November 1961, the military plot of the Rebellion of the Pilots forced the Trujillo family into exile, fleeing to France, and the heretofore puppet-president Joaquín Balaguer assumed effective power.

=== The post-Trujillo instability 1961–1965 ===
At the insistence of the United States, Balaguer was forced to share power with a seven-member Council of State, established on January 1, 1962, and including moderate members of the opposition. OAS sanctions were lifted January 4, and, after an attempted coup, Balaguer resigned and went into exile on January 16. The reorganized Council of State, under President Rafael Filiberto Bonnelly headed the Dominican government until elections could be held. These elections, in December 1962, were won by Juan Bosch, a scholar and poet who had founded the opposition Partido Revolucionario Dominicano (Dominican Revolutionary Party, or PRD) in exile, during the Trujillo years. His leftist policies, including land redistribution, nationalization of certain foreign holdings, and attempts to bring the military under civilian control, antagonized the military officer corps, the Catholic hierarchy, and the upper-class, who feared "another Cuba".

In September 1963, Bosch was overthrown by a right-wing military coup led by Colonel Elías Wessin and was replaced by a three-man military junta. Bosch went into exile to Puerto Rico. Afterwards, a supposedly civilian triumvirate established a de facto dictatorship.

== Dominican Civil War and second United States occupation 1965–66 ==
Dominican Civil War Operation Power Pack
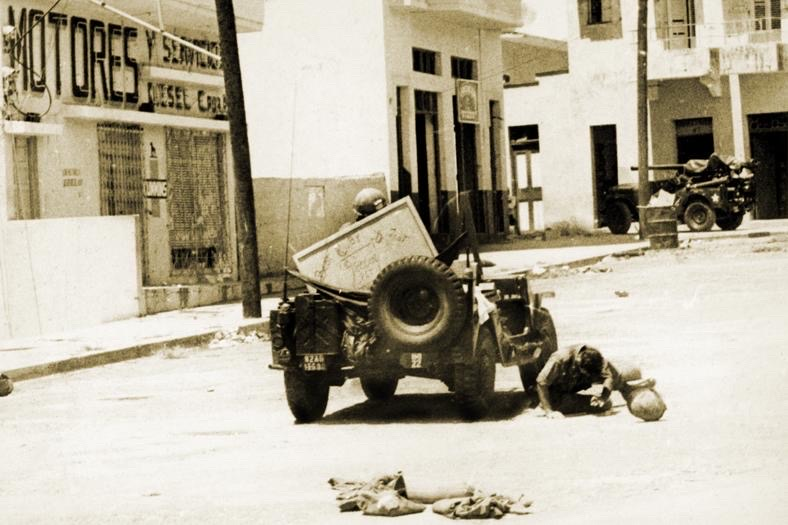
- Wounded American soldier in Santo Domingo, 1965.
Date	April 24, 1965 – September 3, 1965 (4 months, 1 week and 3 days); April 28, 1965 – September 21, 1966 (United States occupation) (1 year, 4 months, 3 weeks and 3 days)
Location	Santo Domingo, Dominican Republic
Result	Loyalist victory: Election of Joaquín Balaguer into Presidency

Belligerents
(Dominican Republic) Loyalists	(Dominican Republic) Constitutionalists	United States

Commanders and leaders
(Dominican Republic) Elías Wessin y Wessin (Dominican Republic) Pedro Bartolomé Benoit (Dominican Republic) Antonio Imbert Barrera	(Dominican Republic) Francisco Caamaño	(United States) Bruce Palmer; (United States) Robert H. York; (United States) Rathvon M. Tompkins; (United States) Ormond R. Simpson

Units involved
Military Training Center (CEFA); Dominican Air Force	Francisco del Rosario Sánchez Battalion; Juan Pablo Duarte Battalion; 6½ Artillery	3rd Battalion, 6th Marines; 4th Marine Expeditionary Brigade; 82nd Airborne Division; 7th Special Forces Group

Strength
4,000 soldiers	2,700 rebel soldiers and 5,000 armed civilians	20,463

Casualties and losses
500 soldiers and 325 policemen killed	600 rebel soldiers dead	47 dead and 172 wounded
- 2,850 Dominican dead

On April 16, 1965, growing dissatisfaction generated another military rebellion on April 24, 1965, that demanded Bosch's restoration. The insurgents, reformist officers and civilian combatants loyal to Bosch commanded by Colonel Francisco Caamaño, and who called themselves the Constitutionalists, staged a coup, seizing the national palace. Immediately, conservative military forces, led by Wessin and calling themselves Loyalists, struck back, strafing the rebel-held national palace with four World War II–vintage F‑51D Mustangs, losing one to ground machine-gun fire. On April 26, F‑51Ds and Vampire jets attacked Santo Domingo, strafing with .50‑caliber machine guns and 20 mm cannons, dropping 500‑lb bombs, and firing HVAR rockets, killing hundreds of people in the city.

On April 28, the anti-Bosch army elements requested U.S. military intervention and U.S. forces landed, ostensibly to protect U.S. citizens and to evacuate U.S. and other foreign nationals. The first U.S. casualty occurred when a Dominican sniper killed a Marine near the U.S. embassy. U.S. President Lyndon B. Johnson, convinced of the defeat of the Loyalist forces and fearing the creation of "a second Cuba" on America's doorstep, ordered U.S. forces to restore order. In what was initially known as Operation Power Pack, 27,677 U.S. troops were ultimately ordered to the Dominican Republic.

Denied a military victory, the Constitutionalist rebels quickly had a Constitutionalist congress elect Caamaño president of the country. U.S. officials countered by backing General Antonio Imbert. On May 7, Imbert was sworn in as president of the Government of National Reconstruction. The next step in the stabilization process, as envisioned by Washington and the OAS, was to arrange an agreement between President Caamaño and President Imbert to form a provisional government committed to early elections. However, Caamaño refused to meet with Imbert until several of the Loyalist officers, including Wessin y Wessin, were made to leave the country.

The American forces attempted to jam Radio Santo Domingo, which the Constitutionalist rebels were using to broadcast messages inciting nationwide rebellion. Despite jamming operations and attacks on relay sites, the rebel broadcasts persisted. On May 13, Imbert launched an eight-day offensive with 2,000 troops against 1,000 rebels in the northern sector. He also directed the Dominican Air Force to target Radio Santo Domingo and its primary transmitter sites near the Peynado Bridge, north of the city. On May 14, Dominican special forces attacked and destroyed the alternate studio and transmitter site north of the Duarte Bridge. These collective actions managed to weaken Radio Santo Domingo to the point that it could no longer broadcast beyond the capital.

During Imbert's offensive, a rebel tank engaged U.S. paratroopers near Duarte Bridge before being destroyed by 106-mm recoilless rifle fire. Imbert's forces captured Radio Santo Domingo along with the northern part of the capital, destroying buildings and killing civilians. Estimates put the casualties at 400 dead and 1,000 wounded. A cease-fire was negotiated by May 21 following talks between Constitutionalist leaders and Presidential Adviser McGeorge Bundy, marking the beginning of neutrality for U.S. forces. At this time, 19 Americans had been killed in action and 115 wounded.

By May 14, the Americans had established a "safety corridor" connecting the San Isidro Air Base and the "Duarte" Bridge to the Embajador Hotel and United States Embassy in the center of Santo Domingo, essentially sealing off the Constitutionalist area of Santo Domingo. Roadblocks were established and patrols ran continuously. Some 6,500 people from many nations were evacuated to safety. In addition, the US forces airlifted in relief supplies for Dominican nationals.

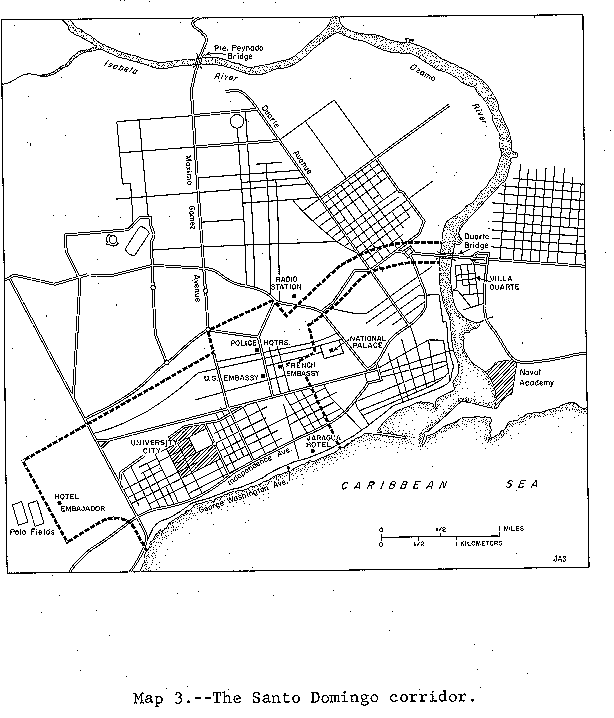
Safety corridor

By mid-May, a majority of the OAS voted for Operation "Push Ahead", the reduction of United States forces and their replacement by an Inter-American Peace Force (IAPF). The Inter-American Peace Force was formally established on May 23. The following troops were sent by each country: Brazil – 1,130, Honduras – 250, Paraguay – 184, Nicaragua – 160, Costa Rica – 21 military police, and El Salvador – 3 staff officers. The first contingent to arrive was a rifle company from Honduras which was soon backed by detachments from Costa Rica, El Salvador, and Nicaragua. Brazil provided the largest unit, a reinforced infantry battalion. Brazilian General Hugo Panasco Alvim assumed command of the OAS ground forces, and on May 26 the U.S. forces began to withdraw.

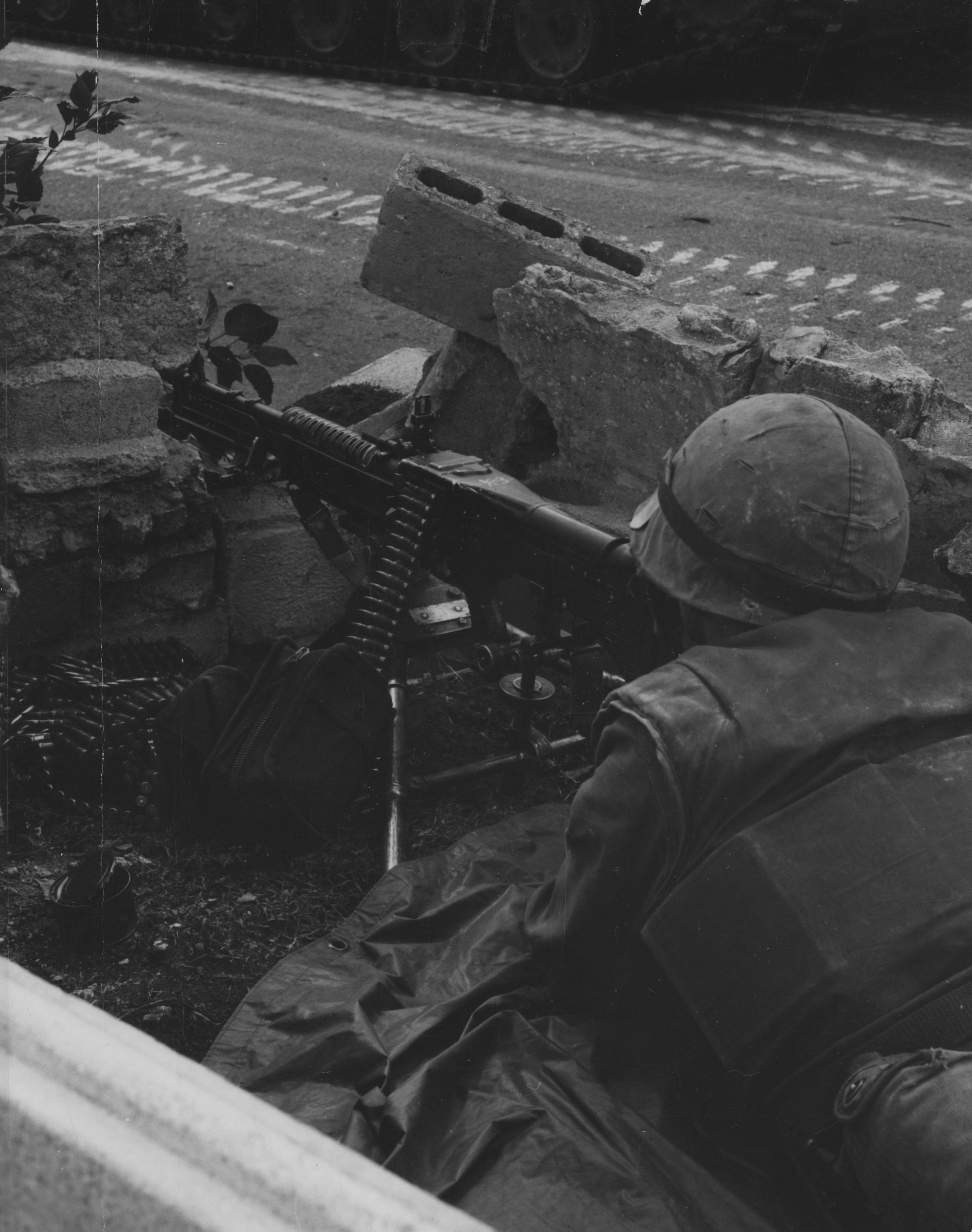
A Marine heavy machine gunner in Santo Domingo

On June 15, the Constitutionalists attacked American positions with heavy machine guns, mortars, and a few light 37mm gun tanks. Another rebel tank was destroyed by seven rounds from a 106-mm recoilless rifle after firing on an 82nd Airborne command post. Two days of fighting in Ciudad Nueva resulted in 4 U.S. soldiers killed and 39 wounded. The Brazilians, who had orders to remain on the defensive, suffered five wounded. The Constitutionalists lost 67 killed and 165 wounded. A truce was declared on August 31, 1965. However, a U.S. paratrooper in the corridor was killed by a rifle grenade fired from the rebel zone on the night of September 2. Most American troops left shortly afterwards as policing and peacekeeping operations were turned over to Brazilian troops, but some U.S. military presence remained until September 1966. On September 14, two members of a support unit attached to the 82nd were ambushed by civilians riding motorcycles. Both were shot in the back. One G.I. died instantly; the other died at a hospital.

American and OAS peacekeeping forces departed by September 21, 1966. A total of 48 American soldiers and Marines died, 27 in action (nine Marines and 18 soldiers); 189 were wounded in action, as were six Brazilians and five Paraguayans. Between 2,850 and 4,275 Dominicans, mostly civilians, were killed, and 3,000 were wounded during the civil war.

== Fourth Republic 1966–present ==
=== Balaguer's second Presidency 1966–1978 ===
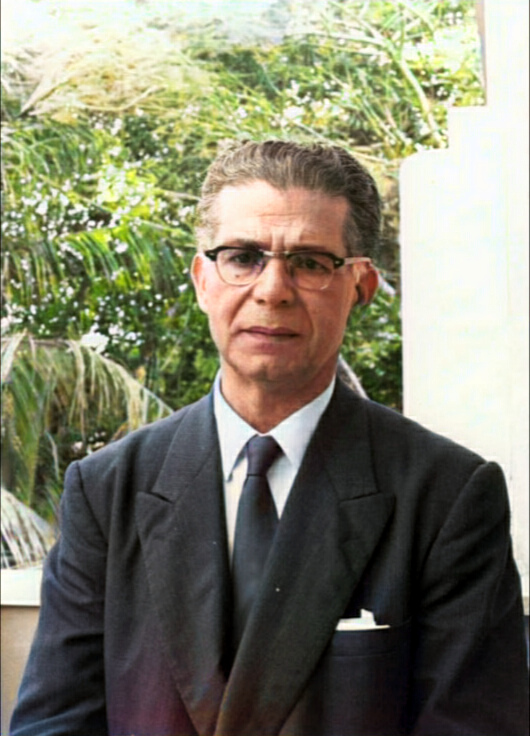
Balaguer in 1966

In June 1966, Joaquín Balaguer, leader of the Reformist Party (which later became the Social Christian Reformist Party (PRSC)), was elected and then re-elected to office in May 1970 and May 1974, both times after the major opposition parties withdrew late in the campaign because of the high degree of violence by pro-government groups. On November 28, 1966, a constitution was created, signed, and put into effect. The constitution stated that the president was elected to a four-year term. If there was a close election there would be a second round of voting to decide the winner. The voting age was eighteen, but married people under eighteen could also vote.

On one hand, Balaguer was considered to be a caudillo who led a regime of terror where 11,000 victims were either tortured or forcibly disappeared and killed. However, Balaguer was also considered to be a major reformer who was instrumental in the liberalization of the Dominican government. During his time as President of the Dominican Republic, the country saw major changes such as legalized political activities, surprise army promotions and demotions, promoting health and education improvements and the instituting of modest land reforms.

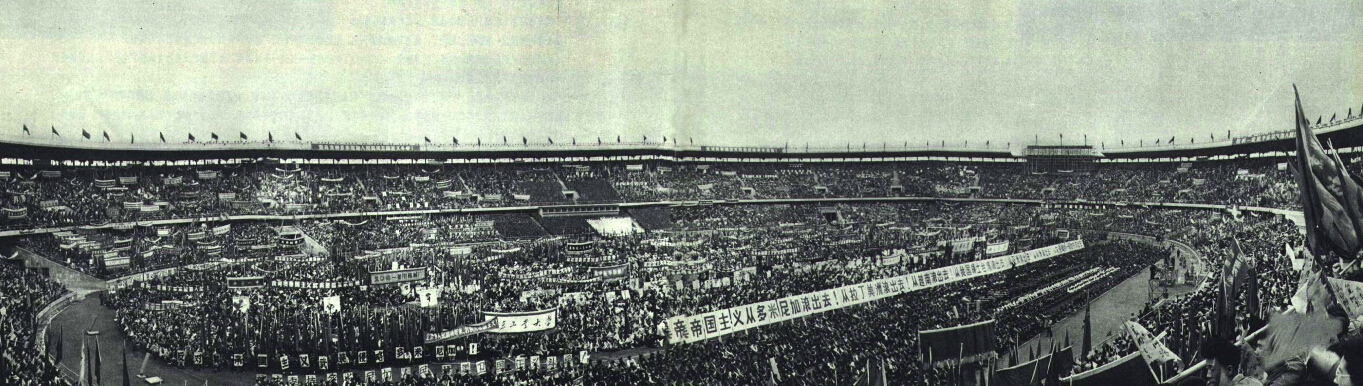
A rally in China, 1966, in solidarity with the Dominican Republic Constitutionalists against the US. Slogans are visible e.g. "U.S. imperialism out of the Dominican Republic! Out of Latin America! Out of Vietnam! Out of our territory, Taiwan!

Balaguer led the Dominican Republic through a thorough economic restructuring, based on opening the country to foreign investment while protecting state-owned industries and certain private interests. This distorted, dependent development model produced uneven results. For most of Balaguer's first nine years in office the country experienced high growth rates (e.g., an average GDP growth rate of 9.4% between 1970 and 1975), to the extent that people talked about the "Dominican miracle". Foreign, mostly U.S. investment, as well as foreign aid, flowed into the country. Sugar, then the country's main export product, enjoyed good prices in the international market, and tourism grew tremendously. As part of Balaguer's land reform policies, land was dished out to peasants among the country's rural population.

However, this excellent macroeconomic performance was not accompanied by an equitable distribution of wealth in some other areas of the country. While a group of new millionaires flourished during Balaguer's administrations, some of the poor simply became poorer. Moreover, some of the poor were commonly the target of state repression, and their socioeconomic claims were labeled 'communist' and dealt with accordingly by the state security apparatus. In the May 1978 election, Balaguer was defeated in his bid for a fourth successive term by Antonio Guzmán Fernández of the PRD. Balaguer then ordered troops to storm the election centre and destroy ballot boxes, declaring himself the victor. U.S. President Jimmy Carter refused to recognize Balaguer's claim, and, faced with the loss of foreign aid, Balaguer stepped down.

=== Guzmán / Blanco interregnum 1978–1986 ===
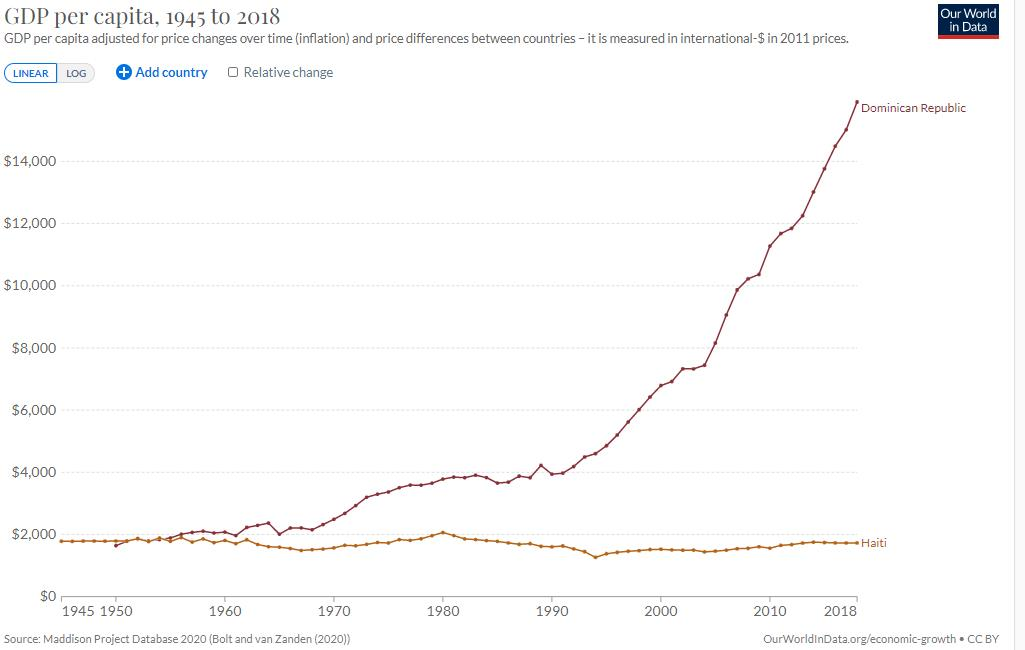
Despite the slowing in economic growth, the economy of the Dominican Republic has far surpassed that of its neighbour Haiti from the 1970s onwards

Guzmán's inauguration on August 16 marked the country's first peaceful transfer of power from one freely elected president to another.

Hurricane David hit the Dominican Republic in August 1979, which caused over $1 billion in damage.

By the late 1970s, economic expansion slowed considerably as sugar prices declined and oil prices rose. Rising inflation and unemployment diminished support for the government and helped trigger a wave of mass emigration from the Dominican Republic to New York, coming on the heels of the similar migration of Puerto Ricans in the preceding decades.

Guzmán committed suicide on July 5, 1982, a month before he would have left office. He was confronted with evidence of his daughter Sonia Guzmán's husband's corruption using her father's position for monetary gain. Guzmán was known as a serious man who never stole money. After being confronted with this, he entered his bathroom and shot himself.

Elections were again held in 1982. Salvador Jorge Blanco of the Dominican Revolutionary Party defeated Bosch and a resurgent Balaguer.

=== Balaguer's third Presidency 1986–1996 ===
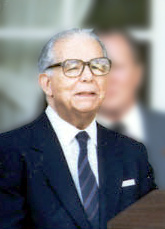
Balaguer in 1988

Balaguer completed his return to power in 1986 when he won the Presidency again and remained in office for the next ten years. Elections in 1990 were marked by violence and suspected electoral fraud. The 1994 election too saw widespread pre-election violence, often aimed at intimidating members of the opposition. Balaguer won in 1994 but most observers felt the election had been stolen. Under pressure from the United States, Balaguer agreed to hold new elections in 1996. He himself would not run.

=== Fernández: First administration 1996–2000 ===
In 1996, U.S.-raised Leonel Fernández Reyna of Bosch's Partido de la Liberación Dominicana (Dominican Liberation Party) secured more than 51% of the vote, through an alliance with Balaguer. The first item on the president's agenda was the partial sale of some state-owned enterprises. Fernández was praised for ending decades of isolationism and improving ties with other Caribbean countries, but he was criticized for not fighting corruption or alleviating the poverty that affected 60% of the population.

=== Mejía's administration 2000–2004 ===
In May 2000 the center-left Hipólito Mejía of the PRD was elected president amid popular discontent over power outages in the recently privatized electric industry. His presidency saw major inflation and instability of the peso in 2003 because of the bankruptcy of three major commercial banks in the country due to the bad policies of the principal managers. During his remaining time as president, he took action to save most savers of the closed banks, avoiding a major crisis. The relatively stable currency fell from about 16 Dominican pesos to 1 United States dollar to about 60 DOP to US$1 and was in the 40s to the dollar when he left office in August 2004. In the May 2004 presidential elections, he was defeated by former president Leonel Fernández.

=== Fernández: Second administration 2004–2012 ===
Fernández instituted austerity measures to deflate the peso and rescue the country from its economic crisis, and in the first half of 2006, the economy grew 11.7%. The peso is currently (2019) at the exchange rate of c. 52 DOP to US$1.

Over the last three decades, remittances (remesas) from Dominicans living abroad, mainly in the United States, have become increasingly important to the economy. From 1990 to 2000, the Dominican population of the U.S. doubled in size, from 520,121 in 1990 to 1,041,910, two-thirds of whom were born in the Dominican Republic itself. More than half of all Dominican Americans live in New York City, with the largest concentration in the neighborhood of Washington Heights in northern Manhattan. Over the past decade, the Dominican Republic has become the largest source of immigration to New York City, and today the metropolitan area of New York has a larger Dominican population than any city except Santo Domingo. Dominican communities have also developed in New Jersey (particularly Paterson), Miami, Boston, Philadelphia, Providence, Rhode Island, and Lawrence, Massachusetts. In addition, tens of thousands of Dominicans and their descendants live in Puerto Rico. Many Dominicans arrive in Puerto Rico illegally by sea across the Mona Passage, some staying and some moving on to the mainland U.S. (See Dominican immigration to Puerto Rico.) Dominicans living abroad sent an estimated $3 billion in remittances to relatives at home, in 2006. In 1997, a new law took effect, allowing Dominicans living abroad to retain their citizenship and vote in presidential elections. President Fernández, who grew up in New York, was the principal beneficiary of this law.

The Dominican Republic was involved in the US-led coalition in Iraq, as part of the Spain-led Latin-American Plus Ultra Brigade. But in 2004, the nation pulled its 300 or so troops out of Iraq. (Note: Dominican troops were under constant mortar attacks but suffered no casualties.)

=== Danilo Medina's administration 2012–2020 ===
Danilo Medina began his tenure with a series of controversial tax reforms so as to deal with the government's troublesome fiscal situation encountered by the new administration. In 2012, he had won presidency as the candidate of ruling Dominican Liberation Party (PLD). In 2016, President Medina won re-election, defeating the main opposition candidate businessman Luis Abinader, with a wide margin.

=== Luis Abinader 2020–present ===
In 2020 Luis Abinader, the presidential candidate for the opposition Modern Revolutionary Party (PRM) won the election and he became the new president, ending the 16-year rule of PLD since 2004. In May 2024, President Luis Abinader won a second term in elections. Especially his tough attitude towards migration from neighbouring Haiti was popular among voters.

== See also ==
- Conchoprimo
- History of Haiti
- History of Latin America
- History of North America
- History of the Americas
- History of the Caribbean
- List of presidents of the Dominican Republic
- Politics of the Dominican Republic
- Spanish colonization of the Americas
- Timeline of Santo Domingo (city)
