= List of wars involving the Dominican Republic =

This is a list of wars involving the Dominican Republic.

== List ==
Date	Name of the battle	Part of	1st combattant	2nd combattant	Result
1 January 1586	Battle of Santo Domingo (1586)	Anglo-Spanish War (1585–1604)	Habsburg Spain	Kingdom of England	English victory
23-30 April 1655	Siege of Santo Domingo (1655)	Anglo-Spanish War (1654–1660) (Franco-Spanish War (1635–1659)) [Thirty Years' War]	Habsburg Spain	Commonwealth of England	Spanish victory
29 March 1660	Battle of Santiago (1660)	Franco-Dominican War	Captaincy General of Santo Domingo	France	French victory
21 January 1691	Battle of Sabana Real	Nine Years' War	Captaincy General of Santo Domingo	France	Spanish victory
19 April 1782	Battle of the Mona Passage	American Revolutionary War	Kingdom of Great Britain	Kingdom of France	British victory
17-18 October 1782	Action of 18 October 1782	American Revolutionary War	Kingdom of Great Britain	Kingdom of France	British victory
11 May 1800	Battle of Puerto Plata Harbor	Quasi-War (French Revolutionary Wars)	United States	French First Republic & Kingdom of Spain \(1700–1808\)	American victory
February–April 1805	Siege of Santo Domingo (1805)	Franco–Haitian War	First French Empire	Haiti	French victory
7 November 1808	Battle of Palo Hincado	Spanish reconquest of Santo Domingo (Napoleonic Wars)	Captaincy General of Santo Domingo	First French Empire	Dominican-Spanish victory
7 November 1808 – 11 July 1809	Siege of Santo Domingo (1808)	Spanish reconquest of Santo Domingo (Napoleonic Wars)	Captaincy General of Santo Domingo	First French Empire	Dominican-Spanish victory

Conflict	Combatant 1	Combatant 2	Results	Casualties
Dominican War of Independence (1844–1856)	Dominican Republic	Republic of Haiti (1844–1849); Second Empire of Haiti (1854–1856)	Dominican victory: Dominican Independence; Withdrawal of Haitian forces; Separation of the Santo Domingo territory from Haiti; Reestablishment of the Dominican–Haitian border; Establishment of the First Republic; Dominican control of the larger east side of Hispaniola	unknown
Dominican Restoration War (1863–1865)	Dominican Republic	Kingdom of Spain	Dominican victory: Restoration of Dominican sovereignty; Withdrawal of Spanish forces; Separation of the Captaincy General of Santo Domingo from Spain, which had previously been restored by Spain in 1861; Establishment of the Second Republic	4,000 dead
Six Years' War (1868–1874)	Dominican Conservatives	Dominican Liberals	Liberal victory: Overthrow of Buenaventura Báez	unknown
First Dominican Civil War (1911–1912)	(Dominican Republic) Dominican Government	Dominican rebels Supported by: Haiti; United States	Rebel victory	over 3,000 dead
Second Dominican Civil War (1914)	(Dominican Republic) Dominican Government Supported by: United States	Dominican rebels	Ceasefire agreement signed	unknown
United States occupation of the Dominican Republic (1916–1924)	Dominican Republic	United States: (United States) Military Government of Santo Domingo	Defeat: Dominican Republic occupied	1,137 killed or wounded
World War II (1941–1945)	Allies; United States; Soviet Union; United Kingdom; China; France; Poland; Canada; Australia; New Zealand; India; South Africa; Yugoslavia; Greece; Denmark; Norway; Netherlands; Belgium; Luxembourg; Czechoslovakia; Brazil; Mexico; Panama; Costa Rica; El Salvador; Guatemala; Honduras; Nicaragua; Dominican Republic; Cuba	Axis; Germany; Japan; Italy; Hungary; Romania; Bulgaria; Croatia; Slovakia; Finland; Thailand; Manchukuo; Mengjiang	Allied victory: Collapse of the Third Reich; Fall of Japanese and Italian empires; Creation of the United Nations; Emergence of the United States and the Soviet Union as superpowers; Beginning of the Cold War	27 killed
Third Dominican Civil War (1965)	Loyalist faction United States IAPF: Brazil; Paraguay; Nicaragua; Costa Rica; El Salvador; Honduras	Constitutionalist faction: Dominican Revolutionary Party; Social Christian Revolutionary Party; June 14th Revolutionary Movement	Loyalist victory: Ceasefire declared; Formation of the provisional government for new elections; Deposition of Juan Bosch of the presidency ratified; Organization of presidential elections in 1966 under international supervision; Election of Joaquín Balaguer as the new president; Establishment of the Fourth Dominican Republic on July 1, 1966	300 KIA
Iraq War (2003–2004)	Invasion (2003); Coalition of the willing: United States; United Kingdom; Australia; Poland; Kurdistan Region: KDP; PUK; Iraqi National Congress: Free Iraqi Forces; Dominican Republic After invasion (2003–2004); Iraq; United States; United Kingdom; MNF–I (2004–09); Kurdistan Region; Awakening Council; Dominican Republic	Invasion (2003) (Ba'athist Iraq) Republic of Iraq: MEK; After invasion (2003–11); Al-Qaeda in Iraq; Islamic Army in Iraq; Islamic State of Iraq; Mahdi Army (Ba'athist Iraq) Naqshbandi Army; Hamas of Iraq; Jaysh al-Mujahideen; 1920 Revolution Brigades; Jamaat Ansar al-Sunna	See § Aftermath: Invasion and occupation of Iraq; Defeat of Ba'ath Party government and execution of Saddam Hussein; Iraqi insurgency, emergence of al-Qaeda in Iraq, and civil war; Subsequent depletion of Iraqi insurgency, improvements in public security; Establishment of democratic elections and formation of new Shia led government; U.S.–Iraq Status of Forces Agreement; Withdrawal of U.S. forces from Iraq	None

== List of battles during Dominican War of Independence ==
Date	Name	1st combattant	2nd combattant	Result
13-18 March 1844	Battle of Cabeza de Las Marías	Dominican Republic	Haiti	Tactical Haitian victory Strategic Dominican victory
19 March 1844	Battle of Azua	Dominican Republic	Haiti	Dominican victory
30 March 1844	Battle of Santiago (1844)	Dominican Republic	Haiti	Dominican victory
13 April 1844	Battle of El Memiso	Dominican Republic	Haiti	Dominican victory
15 April 1844	Battle of Tortuguero	Dominican Republic	Haiti	Dominican victory
17 September 1845	Battle of Estrelleta	Dominican Republic	Haiti	Decisive Dominican victory
27 November 1845	Battle of Beler	Dominican Republic	Haiti	Dominican victory
17 April 1849	Battle of El Número	Dominican Republic	Haiti	Dominican victory
21-22 April 1849	Battle of Las Carreras	Dominican Republic	Haiti	Decisive Dominican victory
22 December 1855	Battle of Santomé	Dominican Republic	Haiti	Dominican victory
22 December 1855	Battle of Cambronal	Dominican Republic	Haiti	Dominican victory
24 January 1856	Battle of Sabana Larga	Dominican Republic	Haiti	Dominican victory

== List of battles during Dominican Restoration War ==
Date	Name	1st combattant	2nd combattant	Result
19 August 1863	Battle of Guayubín	Dominican Republic	Spanish Empire	Dominican victory
22 August 1863	Battle of Guayacanes (1863)	Dominican Republic	Spanish Empire	Dominican victory
6-13 September 1863	Battle of Santiago (1863)	Dominican Republic	Spanish Empire	Dominican victory
23 September 1863	Battle of Arroyo Bermejo	Dominican Republic	Spanish Empire	Dominican victory
1 October 1863	Battle of Jura	Dominican Republic	Spanish Empire	Spanish victory
23 January 1864	Battle of Sabana de San Pedro	Dominican Republic	Spanish Empire	Spanish victory
24 March 1864	Battle of Paso del Muerto	Dominican Republic	Spanish Empire	Spanish victory
4 May 1864	Battle of Sabana Burro	Dominican Republic	Spanish Empire	Dominican victory
15 May 1864	Battle of Monte Cristi	Dominican Republic	Spanish Empire	Spanish victory
4 December 1864	Battle of La Canela	Dominican Republic	Spanish Empire	Dominican victory

== List of battles during Banana Wars ==
Date	Name	1st combattant	2nd combattant	Result
1 February 1904 - 11 February 1904	Santo Domingo Affair	Dominican Republic	United States	U.S. victory
1 June 1916	Battle of Puerto Plata	Dominican Republic	United States	U.S. victory
27 June 1916	Battle of Las Trencheras	Dominican Republic	United States	U.S. victory
29 November 1916	Battle of San Francisco de Macoris	Dominican Republic	United States	U.S. victory

== See also ==
- History of the Dominican Republic
