= Harry Knapp =

Harry Knapp may refer to:

- Harry Shepard Knapp (1856–1928), Vice Admiral of the United States Navy
- Harry K. Knapp (1865–1926), United States financier and horse racing executive

== See also ==
- USS Knapp (DD-653), ship named for Harry Shepard Knapp
- Harold A. Knapp (1924–1989), American mathematician
