= Dominican Civil War (disambiguation) =

The Dominican Civil War (1965) started when supporters of former President Juan Bosch overthrew acting President Donald Reid Cabral.

Dominican Civil War may also refer to:

- Six Years' War (1868–1874), a civil war fought between irregulars and the regular Dominican Army loyal to President Buenaventura Báez
- Dominican Civil War (1911–1912), a civil war between the government led by Eladio Victoria and rebel forces led by Horacio Vásquez
- Dominican Civil War (1914), a civil war that began when General Desiderio Arias led a rebellion against the government in La Vega and Santiago
