= Ernest Calvin Williams =

United States Marine Corps Medal of Honor recipient

Calvin Williams
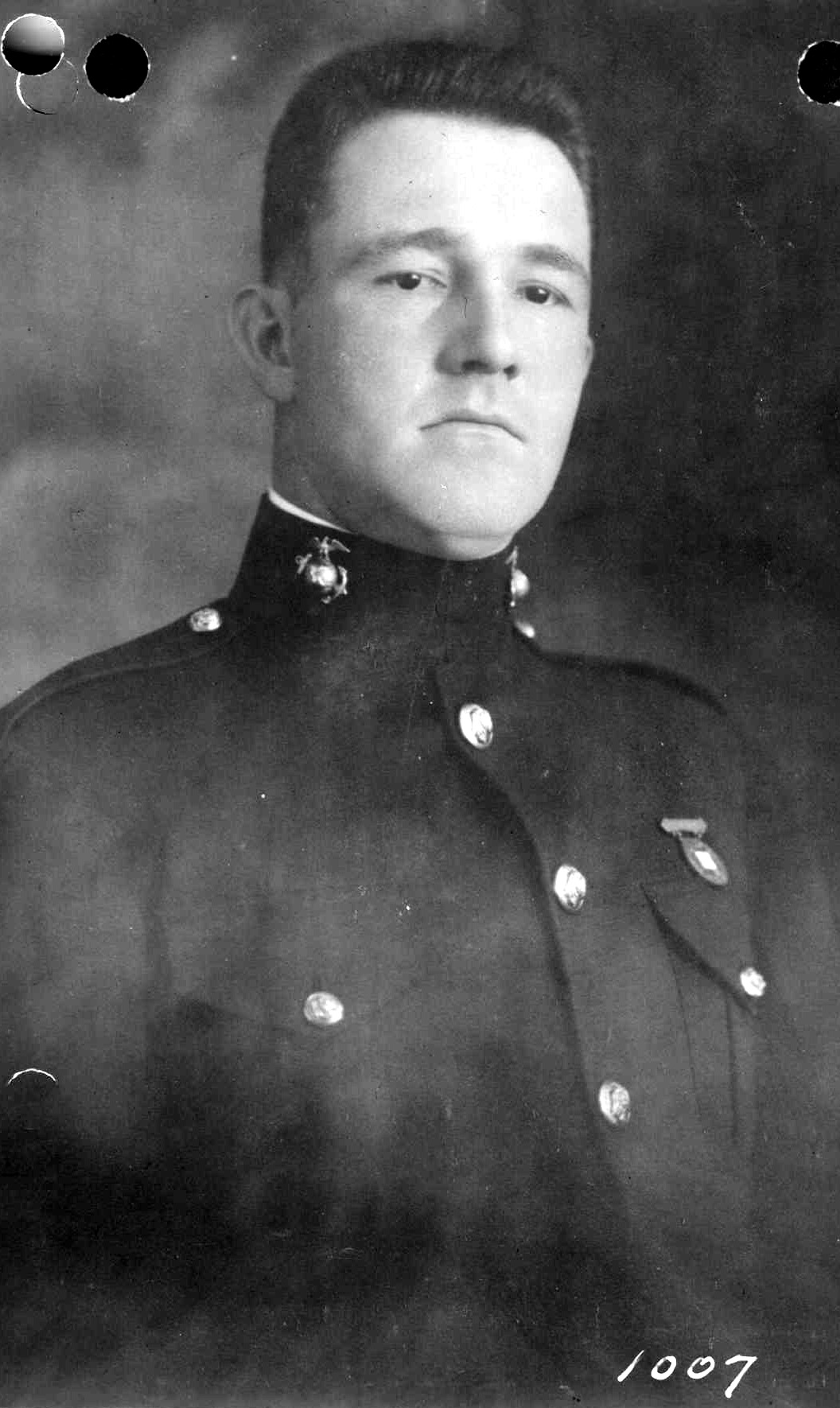
- Born: August 2, 1887; Broadwell, Illinois, US
- Died: July 31, 1940 (aged 52); Indianola, Illinois, US
- Military career
- Allegiance: United States
- Branch: United States Marine Corps
- Service years: 1907 - 1921
- Rank: Lieutenant Colonel
- Conflicts: Occupation of the Dominican Republic * Battle of San Francisco de Macoris; World War I
- Awards: Medal of Honor; Navy Cross

Ernest Calvin Williams (August 2, 1887 – July 31, 1940) was a United States Marine Corps officer who received the Medal of Honor for his actions on November 29, 1916, during the Battle of San Francisco de Macoris. Then 1st Lt Williams, leading 12 Marines, charged and captured the fortress from a numerically superior enemy. These actions were part of the U.S. occupation of the Dominican Republic. He was later awarded the Navy Cross.

== Medal of Honor citation ==
Rank and organization: First Lieutenant, U.S. Marine Corps. Born: August 2, 1887, Broadwell, Illinois Accredited to: Illinois. G.O. No.: 289, April 27, 1917. Other Navy award: Navy Cross.

Citation:

In action against hostile forces at San Francisco de Macoris, Dominican Republic, 29 November 1916. With only a dozen men available, First Lieutenant Williams rushed the gate of the fortress. With eight of his party wounded by rifle fire of the defenders, he pressed on with four remaining men, threw himself against the door just as it was being closed by the Dominicans and forced an entry. Despite a narrow escape from death at the hands of a rifleman, he and his men disposed of the guards and within a few minutes had gained control of the fort and the hundred prisoners confined there.

== See also ==
- List of Medal of Honor recipients
