= Battle of Guayacanas =

Battle on July 3, 1916

- Part of the Banana Wars
- Battle of Guayacanas (the Dominican Republic)
Date	3 July 1916
Location	Santiago, Dominican Republic
Result	American victory

Belligerents
United States	Dominican Republic

Commanders and leaders
(United States) Holland Smith (United States) Joseph A. Glowin	(Dominican Republic) Desiderio Arias

Strength
800 marines 2+ machine guns	80 militia

Casualties and losses
2 killed 10 wounded	27 killed 5 captured

The Battle of Guayacanas was fought on 3 July 1916 between Dominican rebels and the United States during the United States occupation of the Dominican Republic. The Dominicans dug trenches on two hills blocking passage to Santiago and kept up single-shot fire against the automatic weapons of the Americans before the Americans drove them off. Joseph A. Glowin, a corporal, was awarded the Medal of Honor for his bravery during the action.

== Background ==
Triggered by concerns about possible German use of the Dominican Republic as a base for attacks on the United States during World War I, the US Government began a military occupation and administration of that country in 1916. Poorly armed Dominican rebels tried to take on the US Marines occupying the Dominican Republic in conventional battles. The first battle occurred at "Las Trincheras" (the trenches), a defensive position that the Dominicans called "Verdun." The Marines used field artillery to bomb the trenches, machine guns positioned behind the troops to suppress the rifle fire of the rebels, and then quick bayonet rushes to rout the rebels from the trenches. The Marines sustained five dead. They found no dead or weapons in the trenches but later discovered five rebel bodies in the nearby woods.

== Battle ==
The Americans marched on Santiago City, a hotbed for the resistance. Colonel Pendelton's unit came under fire from Dominican soldiers and battle began. However, the Americans advancing on the Dominican positions did not record any injuries during the initial action. To aid the US Marines under fire, Cpl. Glowin fired his machine-gun and was only pulled out of battle when forced to, a brave action that decorated him with the USA's greatest military award the Medal of Honor. After his evacuation, Sergeant Roswell Winans brought up more machine-gun positions to fight off the enemy. This gave the Dominicans more targets to fire at. The captain in charge of the pit was killed and the others wounded. Winans was awarded a medal as well, for firing a Colt machine-gun at the enemy even when it was jammed. Soon, two more gun positions were formed and the Dominicans fled. The 27th and 29th divisions gave chase and killed the enemy commander, routing the Dominican rebels.

== See also ==
- Santo Domingo Affair
- Battle of San Francisco de Macoris

== Bibliography ==
- Langley, Lester D. (1983), The Banana Wars: An Inner History of American Empire, 1900-1934, Lexington: University Press of Kentucky, ISBN 0-8131-1496-9
- McPherson, Alan (2016). A Short History of U.S. Interventions in Latin America and the Caribbean. John Wiley & Sons.
