= Hotchkiss M1909 Benét–Mercié machine gun =

- Type: Light machine gun
- Place of origin: France/United States

Service history
- In service: 1909–1945
- Used by: See Users
- Wars: Italo-Turkish War; United States occupation of Nicaragua; United States occupation of Haiti; United States occupation of the Dominican Republic; Border War; World War I Russian Civil War; Irish Civil War; Warlord Era; Spanish Civil War; World War II

Production history
- Designer: Laurence Benét and Henri Mercié
- Designed: 1901
- Manufacturer: Hotchkiss et Cie
- Produced: 1909-1914 (In Saint-Denis); 1914-1918 (Lyon); 1915-1918 (Coventry)
- No. built: 40,000+ in GB; ~700 in US
- Variants: Hotchkiss M1909 (French Army, 8×50mm Lebel); Hotchkiss Mark I (Britain, .303); Benét–Mercié Machine Rifle M1909 (United States, .30-06)

Specifications
- Mass: 12 kg (26.5 lb)
- Length: 1.23 m (48 in)
- Barrel length: 64 cm (25 in)
- Cartridge: .303 British (Britain); 8mm Lebel (France).30-06 Springfield (U.S.); 7×57 mm Mauser (Brazil and Spain)
- Caliber: .303 (7.70 mm); 8 mm.30 (7.62 mm); 7 mm
- Action: Gas-operated
- Rate of fire: 400-600 rounds per minute
- Maximum firing range: 3800 m
- Feed system: 30-round feed strip, or belt-fed

The Hotchkiss M1909 machine gun was a light machine gun of the early 20th century that was developed and built by Hotchkiss et Cie. It was also known as the Hotchkiss Mark I, Hotchkiss Portative and M1909 Benét–Mercié.

== Design ==
It was based on a design by Austrian nobleman and Army officer, Adolf Odkolek von Újezd, who sold the manufacturing rights to Hotchkiss in 1893. Several improved versions were designed by Hotchkiss's American manager, Laurence Vincent Benét (son of General Stephen Vincent Benét) and his French assistant, Henri Mercié.

It was gas-operated and air-cooled, had a maximum range of 3,800 m (4,200 yd) and weighed 12 kg (27 lb). Initial models were fed by a 30-round feed strip but later models could be either strip-fed or belt-fed. The U.S. types had a bipod, while some others used a small tripod. This tripod, fitted under the firearm, could be moved with the weapon, and thus was very different from larger, heavier tripods of the period.

== Manufacture ==
Production began at the Hotchkiss factory in Saint-Denis, Paris, but in 1914, with the invading German army threatening the city, the French military authorities ordered the factory to be moved to Lyon. The following year, the British government invited Hotchkiss to set up a factory in Coventry. By the end of the war, this factory had manufactured over 40,000 M1909s.

The U.S. version was made by Springfield Armory and by Colt's Manufacturing Company. Total production for the United States was 670. This was small compared to the huge production runs of firearms later in the 20th century, but this was a significant number for the size of the contemporary U.S. Army. The M1909's adoption coincided with the withdrawal of the .30-06 manually operated Gatling guns from the U.S. Army's arsenals.

== Service ==
As the Hotchkiss M1909 (or Mle 1909), firing the 8 mm Lebel, it was adopted by the French military in 1909 but not issued as an infantry weapon. The 700 examples manufactured in the US were used in the fortresses at Verdun in a defensive capacity, on some fighter aircraft, and in Mark V* tanks acquired from Great Britain.

A variant to use the .303 round was produced in Britain at the Coventry factory as the "Hotchkiss Mark I" and issued to some cavalry regiments. The MkI* variant, with the wooden stock replaced with a pistol grip, was widely used in British tanks during World War I.

It was adopted by the United States in 1909 as the "Benét–Mercié Machine Rifle, Caliber .30 U. S. Model of 1909" firing the .30-06 cartridge. It was also used by other countries, including Belgium, Sweden and Mexico. France and Britain used the Hotchkiss M1909 through World War I and on into World War II. The Australian Light Horse, the New Zealand Mounted Rifles Brigade, the Imperial Camel Corps, and the Duke of Lancaster's Own Yeomanry used the Hotchkiss in the Sinai and Palestine Campaign (1915–17).

U.S. forces used the Benét–Mercié at the Battle of Masaya in 1912, In the 1915 Haitian Campaign, the 1916 Battle of Guayacanas, the Battle of Columbus in 1916 (4 guns fired 20,000 rounds total in the engagement), the subsequent Pancho Villa Expedition in Mexico of 1916–17, and initially in France.

On the American guns, firing pins and extractors broke frequently. Some members of the U.S. press derisively called the M1909 the "daylight gun" because of the difficulty in replacing broken parts at night and jams caused when a loading strip was inserted upside down in darkness. Major Julian Hatcher was assigned to look into the issue after Columbus and found almost all the issues were due to inadequate training. U.S. troops during the Villa Expedition received additional training and the M1909 was considered an effective weapon. During service in the Villa Expedition in 1916, the M1909 was fitted with the Model 1908 Warner & Swasey Musket Sight (more well known as an early telescopic sight on the M1903 Springfield Rifle) to aid in long-range firing. U.S. production had already ceased before World War I and only a small number were available to the U.S. military. However, the U.S. Navy still used them in that period.

== Users ==
- Australia
- Belgium
- Brazil
- Republic of China
- France
- Kingdom of Greece
- India
- Ireland: Used in armored cars by the Irish National Army during the Irish Civil War
- Kingdom of Italy
- Mexico
- Ottoman Empire
- Qajar Iran – South Persia Rifles
- Russia
- Spain
- Sweden
- United Kingdom
- United States
- New Zealand

== Gallery ==
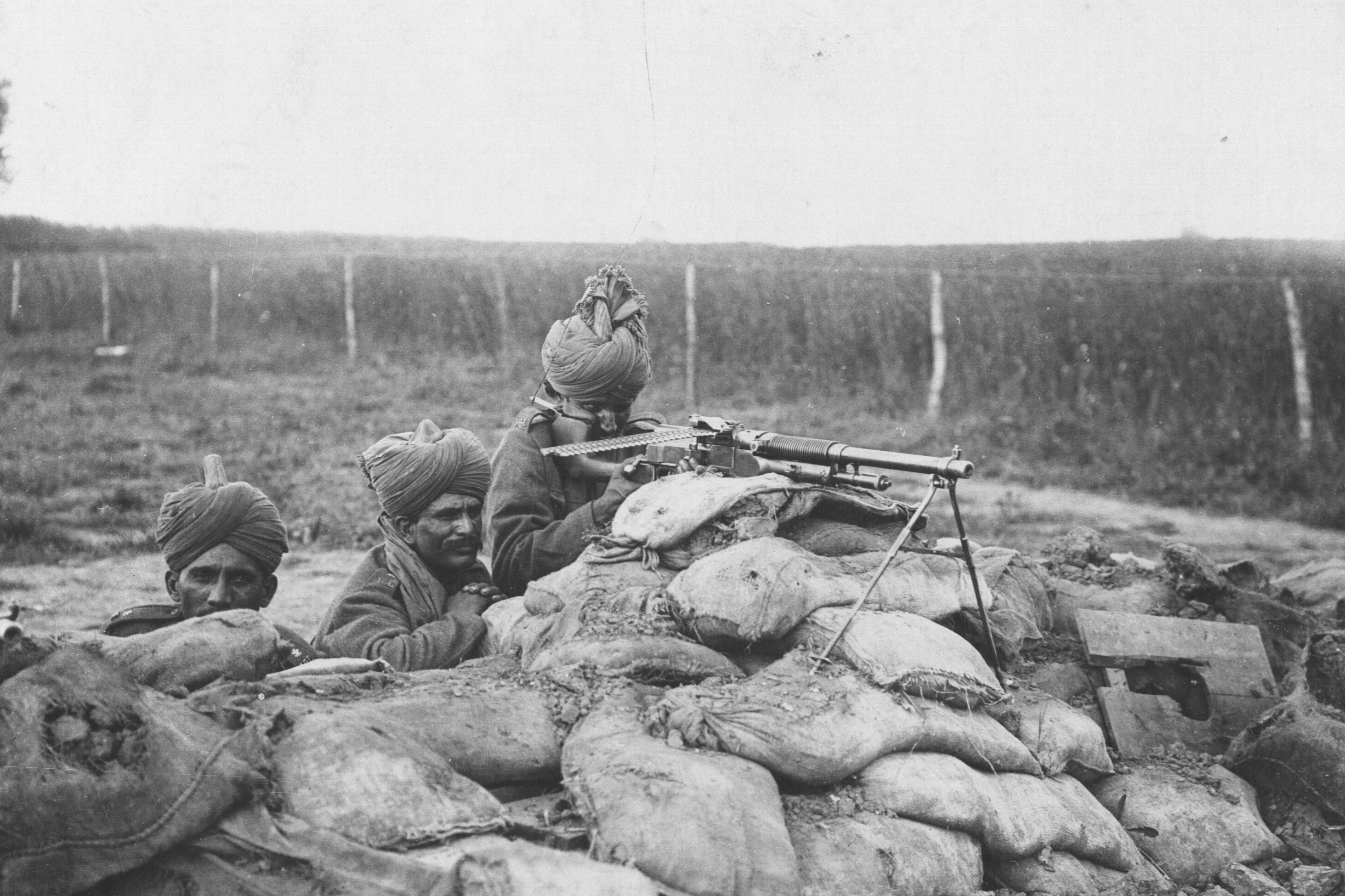
2nd Queen Victoria's Own Rajput Light Infantry gunners in Flanders, winter of 1914–1915

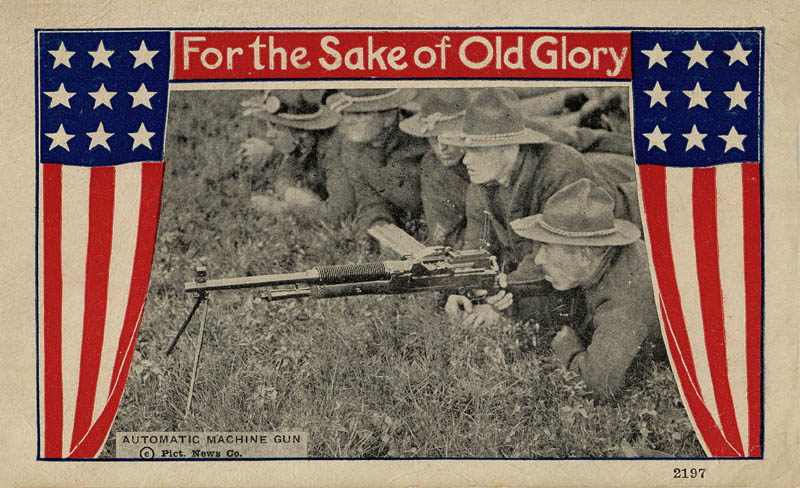
Old Glory postcard with U.S. soldiers firing an M1909 machine gun

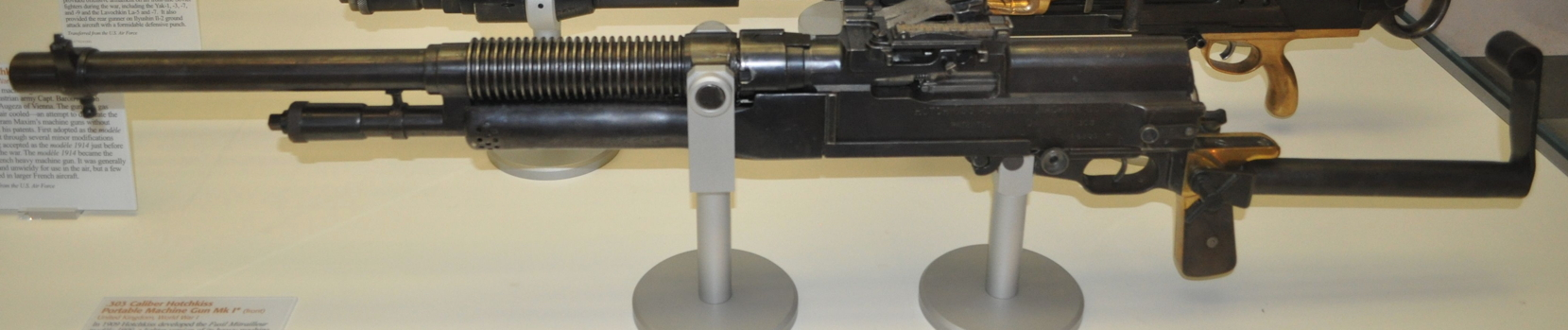
Hotchkiss Mark I on display at the Steven F. Udvar-Hazy Center

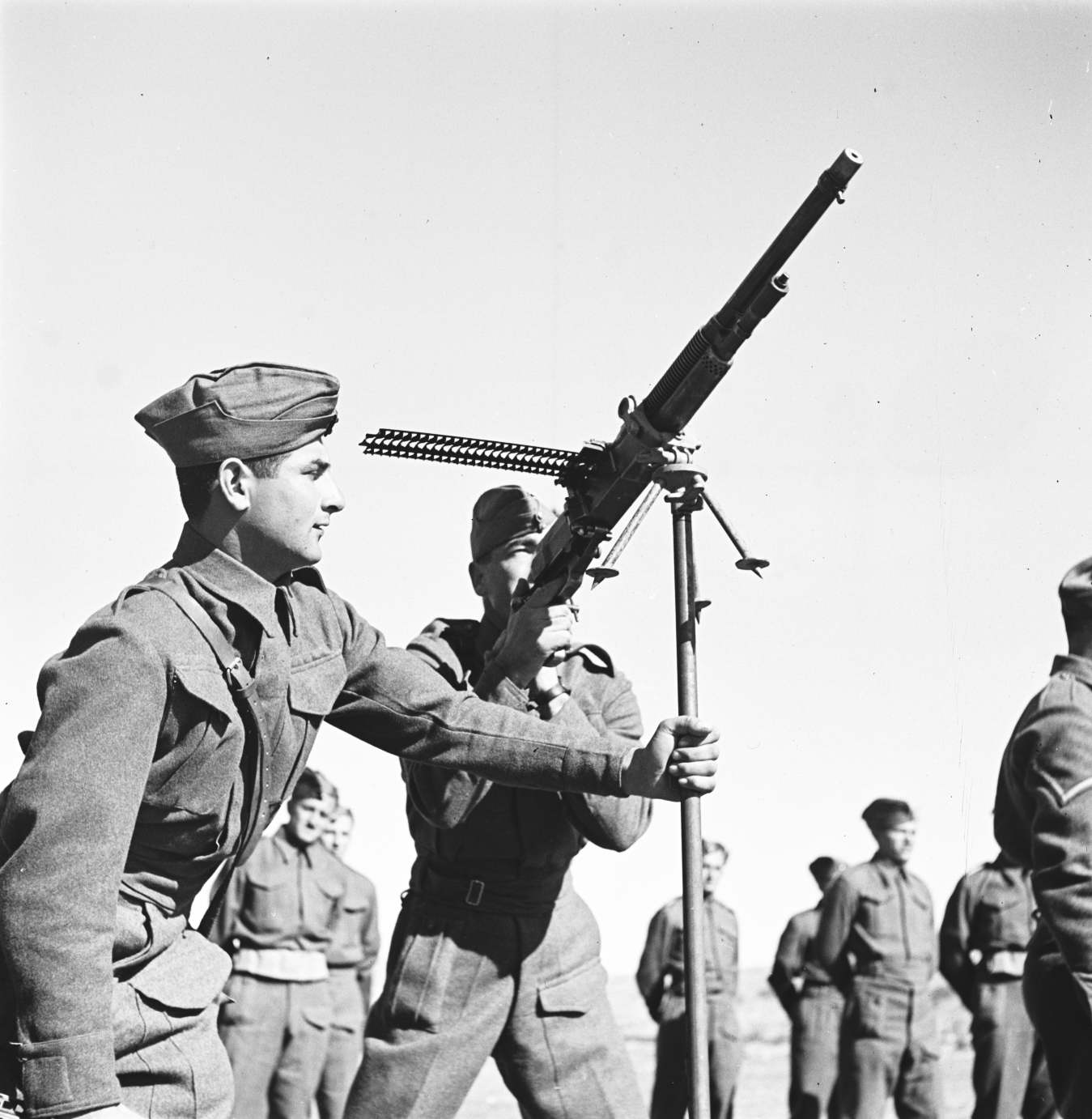
British soldiers of the Royal East Kent Regiment in 1941

== See also ==
- Light machine gun
- List of individual weapons of the U.S. Armed Forces
- Huot automatic rifle
- Chauchat - Another French light machine gun that was also used by the U.S. Army
- Hotchkiss M1922 machine gun
