= Roswell Winans =

United States Marine Corps Medal of Honor recipient

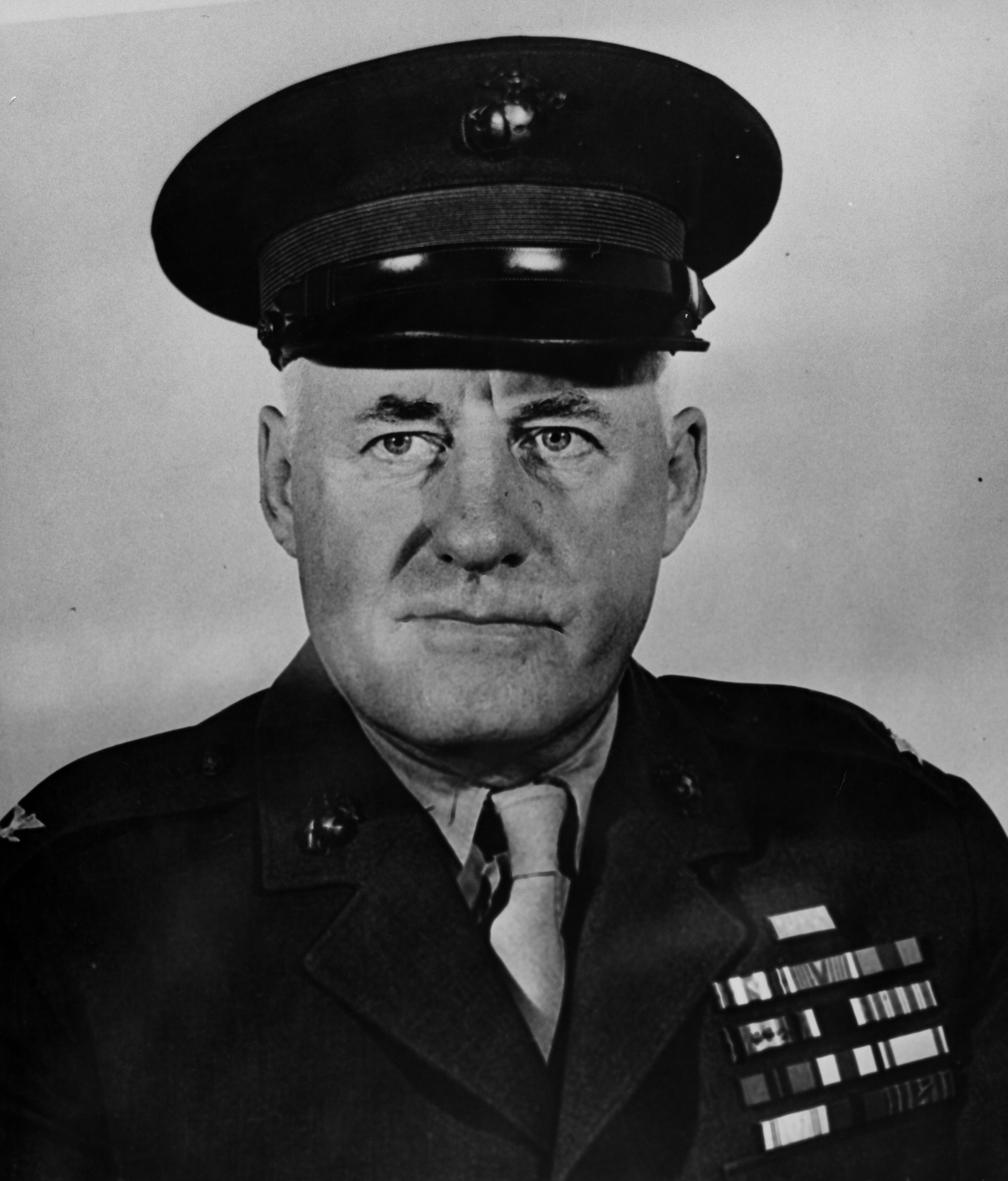
- Roswell Winans, Medal of Honor recipient
- Born: December 9, 1887; Brookville, Indiana, US
- Died: April 7, 1968 (aged 80); San Diego, California, US
- Military career
- Allegiance: United States
- Branch: United States Army; United States Marine Corps
- Service years: 1906–1910 (US Army); 1912–1946 (USMC)
- Rank: Brigadier General
- Commands: Marine Corps Base San Diego; 2nd Battalion, 4th Marines
- Conflicts: Dominican Campaign; Veracruz Expedition; World War I: Battle of Belleau Wood; Meuse-Argonne Offensive; Haitian Campaign; Nicaraguan Campaign; Yangtze Patrol; World War II
- Awards: Medal of Honor; Silver Star (2); Purple Heart; Croix de Guerre

Roswell Winans (December 9, 1887 – April 7, 1968) was a highly decorated United States Marine, who as a First Sergeant earned the Medal of Honor during combat in the Dominican Republic. He was later commissioned and served as a company officer with the 5th Marine Regiment in France receiving several citations for bravery in combat.

During the interwar period, Winans remained in the Marine Corps and served in Haiti, Nicaragua and China. He rose to the rank of Colonel at the beginning of World War II and served as Chief of Staff, Marine Corps Base San Diego, California for the most of War. He completed his career as Commanding Officer of Marine Barracks Hawthorne Naval Ammunition Depot, Nevada in April 1946.

== Early service ==
Roswell Winans was born December 9, 1887, in Brookville, Indiana as the son of William C. Winans and Mary Davenport. He was youngest of four children and following the high school, Winans worked for two years in Alaska, before joining the United States Army at Jonesboro, Arkansas in February 1906. After leaving the army, Winans joined United States Marine Corps on October 10, 1912, as Sergeant and was attached to the Marine Barracks at Mare Island Navy Yard, California. He later participated in the occupation of Veracruz with 1st Marine Brigade in April 1914 and later received Marine Corps Good Conduct Medal for his enlisted service.

Winans reached the rank of first sergeant and sailed with 2nd Marine Brigade under Brigadier General Joseph H. Pendleton to Dominican Republic in May 1916. Marines took the cities of Puerto Plata and Monte Cristi on June 1 and Winans participated in the engagement at Guayacanes. He distinguished himself on July 3, 1916, while coolly opened fire with his Colt Gun on the enemy trenches and when the gun jammed, stood up and repaired it under fire. Winans continued firing his gun until the enemy had abandoned the trenches. For this act of valor, he was decorated with the Medal of Honor, the United States highest military decoration.

== World War I ==
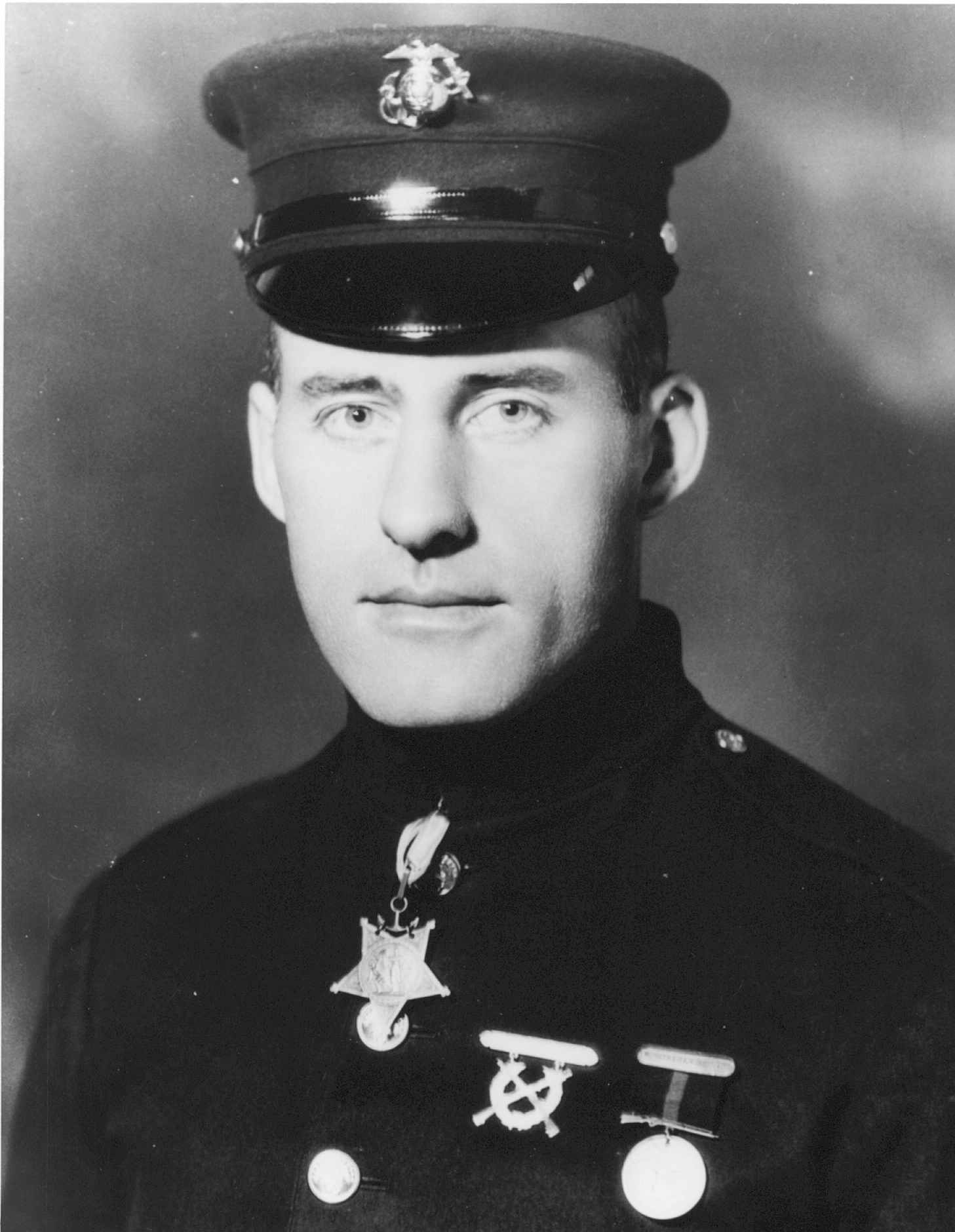
Winans as First Sergeant in 1917.

At the time of the United States entry into World War I in April 1917, Winans assigned to the 5th Marine Regiment at Philadelphia Navy Yard and promoted to the temporary rank of captain on July 26, 1917. He then assumed command of newly created 17th Company, 1st Battalion under Major Julius S. Turrill and began with the intensive training focused on offensive and defensive trench warfare, including trench construction, grenade throwing, bayonet fighting, gas mask drill, weapons firing at land targets and airplanes and artillery and infantry-artillery demonstrations.

The Fifth Marines embarked for France and arrived to Saint-Nazaire in early July of that year and spent the rest of the year with training with the French elite mountain infantry, Chasseurs Alpins, near Gondecourt in northern France. Among the members of his company were several future Marine generals including Robert Blake, LeRoy P. Hunt, Leonard E. Rea and Amor L. Sims.

In mid-March 1918, Sims and his battalion were ordered to the frontline trenches in the Toulon Sector, just southeast of Verdun. It was a relatively quiet period and they spent their time with the repairing of existing trenches and dugouts, digging new trenches, and stringing and repairing barbed wire entanglements. The 5th Marines departed Toulon Sector in mid-May 1918 and after brief period of training at the Gizors training area, they were finally ordered to the frontline north of Marne River near Château-Thierry on June 2.

Winans commanded his company during the battle of Belleau Wood and distinguished himself during the assault on Hill 1942, for which he was decorated with Silver Star citation. He was shot through the foot on June 14, 1918, during German counterattack, but refused to be evacuated until the enemy was repulsed and until he had made a personal inspection of the line and found it secure. Refusing assistance, he proceeded to the rear across the shell-swept fields behind Belleau Wood to the evacuation station, thereby aggravating the injury to his foot. Winans received his second Silver Star citation for this act of bravery.

Winans later rejoined his battalion and participated in the fighting in the Argonne Forest during the Meuse-Argonne Offensive and received French Croix de guerre with Guilt Star. Following the Armistice, he marched with his regiment to the Rhineland and participated in the occupation duties in Coblenz.

== Interwar period ==
Upon his return stateside in September 1919, Winans retained the rank of Captain and assumed command of the Marine Detachment of receiving ship at Philadelphia Navy Yard. His main duty was to maintain order on the ship, which served as barracks for troops returning from overseas. He was ordered to the Marine Corps Schools, Quantico in September 1922 and entered the Field officers' course in order to improve his officer's education.

Winans completed the course one year later and joined the 1st Brigade of Marines under Brigadier general Theodor P. Kane in Haiti. He participated in the peacetime operations and jungle patrols against Cacos rebels and returned to the United States in November 1925. Winans then served at Marine Barracks, Quantico, Virginia, before he was transferred to the Marine Corps Base San Diego, California in August 1927.

In August 1930, Winans returned to the Marine Corps Schools, Quantico and entered the Company officers' course, which he completed one year later. He then participated in the peacekeeping operations in Nicaragua, before returned stateside and was ordered to the Army Industrial College in Washington, D.C. in August 1931. Winans graduated in May 1932 and was promoted to Major.

He then remained in Washington area, serving at the Headquarters Marine Corps and was promoted to lieutenant colonel on July 27, 1935. Winan was ordered to Far East in October 1936 and assumed command of 2nd Battalion, 4th Marines. He participated in the defense of Shanghai International Settlement in China during the period of rising tension between China and Japan. Winans remained in China until April 1938, when he was transferred to Marine Corps Base San Diego, California. He was promoted to colonel on March 1, 1941.

== World War II ==
Following the Japanese attack on Pearl Harbor and the United States entry into World War II, Winans was still serving as Chief of staff, Marine Corps Base San Diego under Brigadier general William H. Rupertus and was co-responsible the training of new recruits due to critical need of troops for combat units. He served in this capacity consecutively under generals James L. Underhill, and William C. James, before assumed temporary command of the base in February 1944.

He was relieved by Brigadier general Matthew H. Kingman in April that year and served in San Diego Base until December, when he was transferred to the Hawthorne Naval Ammunition Depot, Nevada as Commanding officer of Marine Barracks there. Winans was responsible for the guarding of the Depot until the end of April 1946, when he was relieved of duty awaiting retirement. Winans retired on August 1, 1946, and was advanced to the rank of brigadier general on the retired list for having been specially commended in combat.

== Death ==
General Roswell Winans died on April 7, 1968, at the San Diego Naval Hospital in San Diego, California. He was buried at Cypress View Mausoleum and Crematory in San Diego.

== Awards and decorations ==
Brigadier General Winans' personal decorations include:

1st Row	Medal of Honor		Silver Star with Oak leaf cluster	Purple Heart
2nd Row	Marine Corps Good Conduct Medal	Mexican Service Medal	Dominican Campaign Medal	World War I Victory Medal with three battle clasps
3rd Row	Army of Occupation of Germany Medal	Marine Corps Expeditionary Medal	Second Nicaraguan Campaign Medal	China Service Medal
4th Row	American Defense Service Medal	American Campaign Medal	World War II Victory Medal	French Croix de guerre 1914–1918 with Gilt Star

=== Medal of Honor citation ===
The Medal of Honor was awarded to then-First Sergeant Roswell Winans, USMC, on October 30, 1916, for his actions in Guayacanas on July 3, 1916.

Rank and organization: Brigadier General (then First Sergeant), U.S. Marine Corps. Place and date: Guayacanas, Dominican Republic, July 3, 1916. Entered service at: Washington. Born. December 9, 1887, Brookville, Ind. G.O. No.: 244, October 30, 1916.

Citation:

During an engagement at Guayacanas on July 3, 1916, 1st Sgt. Winans participated in action against a considerable force of rebels on the line of march. During a running fight of 1,200 yards, our forces reached the enemy entrenchments and Cpl. Joseph A. Glowin, U.S.M.C., placed the machinegun, of which he had charge, behind a large log across the road and immediately opened fire on the trenches. He was struck once but continued firing his gun, but a moment later he was again struck and had to be dragged out of the position into cover. 1st Sgt. Winans, U.S.M.C., then arrived with a Colt's gun which he placed in a most exposed position, coolly opened fire on the trenches and when the gun jammed, stood up and repaired it under fire. All the time Glowin and Winans were handling their guns they were exposed to a very heavy fire which was striking into the logs and around the men, 7 men being wounded and 1 killed within 20 feet. 1st Sgt. Winans continued firing his gun until the enemy had abandoned the trenches.

That day, July 3, 1916, only 80 Dominicans led by General Carlos Daniel and captain Máximo Cabral fought nearly a thousand heavily armed American Marines (24 officers and 837 soldiers) which intended to reach the city of Santiago de los Caballeros to take the fortress there.

=== Silver star citation (1st award) ===
By direction of the President, under the provisions of the act of Congress approved July 9, 1918 (Bul. No. 43, W.D., 1918) Captain Roswell Winans (MCSN: 0–1074), United States Marine Corps, is cited by the Commanding General, SECOND Division, American Expeditionary Forces, for gallantry in action and a silver star may be placed upon the ribbon of the Victory Medals awarded him. Captain Winans distinguished himself while serving with the Fifth Regiment (Marines), 2d Division, American Expeditionary Forces at Chateau-Thierry, France, 6 June to 10 July 1918.

=== Silver star citation (2nd award) ===
By direction of the President, under the provisions of the act of Congress approved July 9, 1918 (Bul. No. 43, W.D., 1918), Captain Roswell Winans (MCSN: 0–1074), United States Marine Corps, is cited by the Commanding General, American Expeditionary Forces, for gallantry in action and a silver star may be placed upon the ribbon of the Victory Medals awarded him. Captain Winans distinguished himself by gallantry in action while serving with the 17th Company, 5th Regiment (Marines), 2d Division, American Expeditionary Forces, on 15 June 1918, at Belleau Woods, France. Severely wounded in the foot, he refused to be evacuated until the enemy was repulsed and until he had made a personal inspection of the line and found it secure. Refusing assistance, he proceeded to the rear across the shell-swept fields behind Belleau Wood to the evacuation station, thereby aggravating the injury to his foot, sacrificing his own interests to the common cause.

== See also ==
- List of Medal of Honor recipients
