= Battle of San Francisco de Macoris =

Battle of San Francisco de Macorís
- Part of the Banana Wars
- Battle of San Francisco de Macoris (the Dominican Republic)
Date	29 November 1916
Location	San Francisco de Macorís, Dominican Republic
Result	American victory

Belligerents
United States	Dominican Republic

Commanders and leaders
(United States) Lt. Ernest Williams	(Dominican Republic) Juan Perez

Strength
13 marines	300 militia 1 fort

Casualties and losses
8 wounded	100 prisoners 1 fort captured

Letter of Commendation for the 12 Marines that stormed the Fortaleza with Lt Williams.

The Battle of San Francisco de Macoris took place on 29 November 1916 during the early stages of the United States occupation of the Dominican Republic. Dominican forces in San Francisco de Macoris had refused to lay down their arms and had taken control of the local fortress. This was in direct violation of the terms imposed by the military government installed by the United States. A small squad of Marines that were close by were able to make their way inside the fortress and surprise the defenders, securing it before any organized resistance could take place.

== Background ==
On 13 May 1916, Rear Admiral William B. Caperton forced the Dominican Republic's Secretary of War Desiderio Arias, who had seized power from Juan Isidro Jimenes Pereyra, to leave Santo Domingo by threatening the city with naval bombardment. Three days after Arias left the country, Marines landed and took control of the country within two months, and in November the United States imposed a military government under Rear Admiral Harry Shepard Knapp. The Marines confiscated some 53,000 firearms (mostly ancient muskets), 200,000 rounds of ammunition, and 14,000 edged weapons. In San Francisco de Macoris, however, the situation was somewhat different. Juan Perez, the provisional governor, and a band of followers had occupied a local fort and refused to lay down their arms. This was a direct violation of the directives that were promulgated by the military government installed by the United States.

In the town, some 30 miles southeast of Santiago, was one company of the 4th Marine Regiment: the 31st. They had allowed a few hundred supporters of Arias to barricade themselves in the fortaleza. During this time the Marines were being sniped at from inside the fortress and relations with civilians in the town was deteriorating because of the indecisiveness of the Marine commander. Eventually the 31st Company would be reinforced by the 47th Company and First Lieutenant Ernest C. Williams, would take over command. He decided to forcibly oust the Dominicans from their stronghold after they refused to evacuate their positions inside the fortress.

== The Battle ==
During the night of 29 November Lieutenant Williams along with twelve Marines crept as close to the entrance of the fort as was possible without arousing suspicion. On a signal from Lieutenant Williams, the Marines made a dash for the open gate. The Dominicans, taken by surprise, were unable to slam the gate closed. The rebels were able to let loose with a fusillade from the fort which cut down eight of the Marines in their rush for the gate. Williams and the remaining four men pushed their way through the entrance, firing their weapons as they burst into the fort. After a fierce, ten-minute firefight the fort was secured, and the fight was over. During the battle some two hundred of Perez's followers were able to escape the fort but another one hundred were forced to surrender inside the fortaleza. Eight of the twelve US Marines were wounded during the battle. First Lieutenant Williams received the Medal of Honor for his actions during the battle.

This engagement was the last organized resistance which the 4th Marine Regiment encountered in the Dominican Republic, although minor patrol actions continued to occur for some time.

== See also ==
- Battle of Guayacanas
- History of the Dominican Republic
