= Ramón Natera =

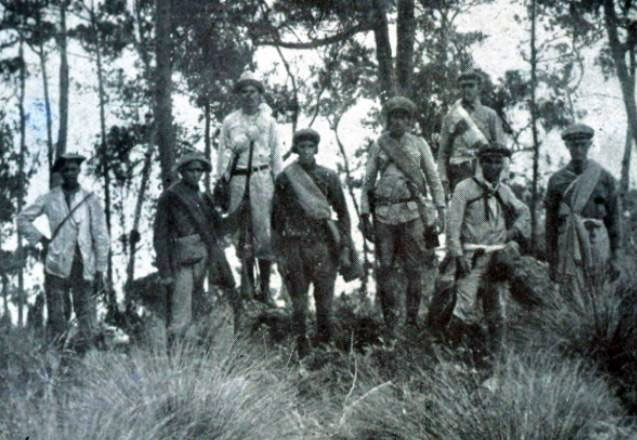
A group of gavilleros, 1916

Ramon Natera (died November 1923), who also went by the title General Ramon Natera, was a leader of the guerrilla resistance against the invasion of the Dominican Republic by the US Marines from 1916. He began his campaign as a young man and built up the largest guerrilla force in the country, declaring his aim was the removal of US forces and the restoration of self-government by the Dominican Republic. Natera surrendered to US forces in May 1922 and was killed the next year after a dispute with a rural guard.

== Biography ==
Natera was a black Dominican who joined the anti-American resistance in the east of the country at a young age. He is considered the most important guerrilla fighter as "he assembled the largest force and used the most sophisticated political tactics." He was an ardent nationalist who had a very disciplined group of peasants who fought the USA's imperialism. Known colloquially as gavilleros or campeneros, the guerrillas who opposed their invasion were labeled as bandits. Natera insisted his campaign was about more than local banditry and that he was fighting to restore the self-government of the Dominican Republic and the withdrawal of US occupying forces.

Natera was adept at avoiding detection he frequently moved encampments, changed which horse he rode and avoided routine. Natera was captured by US forces in 1916 but, with the assistance of guerrillas, escaped and continued the fight until 1922 when a stalemate emerged after the appointment of Colonel Charles H. Lyman as district commander. Lyman employed new tactics of deploying pro-US Dominicans against the guerrillas and unlawfully clamped down on press freedoms.

Natera met with Lyman at the start of May 1922 to arrange a ceasefire and on 5 May surrendered to US forces. He brought his men in to surrender three days later. Natera was killed in November 1923 in a dispute with a guard campestre (rural guard). In 1924 US forces withdrew and Dominican self-government was restored.
