= Dominican Civil War (1914) =

1914 civil war in the Dominican Republic

Date	30 March 1914 – 6 August 1914 (4 months and 1 week)
Location	Dominican Republic
Result	Ceasefire agreement signed

Belligerents
(Dominican Republic) Dominican Government	Dominican rebels	United States

Commanders and leaders
(Dominican Republic) José Bordas Valdez	General Vidal	(United States) Edward Walter Eberle

Strength
600 troops 2 cruisers	unknown	1 gunboat

The Dominican Civil War (1914) was a civil war in the Dominican Republic that started as a rebellion against the government led by General Desiderio Arias in La Vega and Santiago de los Caballeros, beginning on March 30, 1914. José Bordas Valdez was elected President without opposition on June 15, 1914. The U.S. Navy ships intervened to end the bombardment of Puerto Plata beginning on June 26, 1914. The U.S. Army troops were deployed in support of the government in Santo Domingo in July 1914. The U.S. government mediated the signing of a ceasefire agreement between government and rebel representatives on August 6, 1914. Some 500 individuals were killed during the conflict.

== See also ==
- Santo Domingo Affair
- Dominican Civil War (1911–1912)
- United States occupation of the Dominican Republic (1916–1924)
- United States involvement in regime change
- Latin America–United States relations

== Bibliography ==
- Atkins, G. Pope; Wilson, Larman C. (1998). The Dominican Republic and the United States: From Imperialism to Transnationalism. Athens, GA: University of Georgia Press. ISBN 0820319317.
- Maurer, Noel (2013). The Empire Trap: The Rise and Fall of U.S. Intervention to Protect American Property Overseas, 1893—2013. Princeton: Princeton University Press. ISBN 9780691155821.
