= Battle of Sabana Burro =

1864 battle of the Dominican Restoration War

- Part of the Dominican Restoration War
Date	May 4, 1864
Location	Around the Iguamo and Guamira rivers in Hato Mayor del Rey, Dominican Republic
Result	Dominican victory

Belligerents
(Dominican Republic) Dominican Rebels	Kingdom of Spain; Captaincy General of Santo Domingo

Commanders and leaders
(Dominican Republic) Genaro Díaz	(Spain) Unknown

Units involved
Unknown	Unknown

Casualties and losses
Unknown	Unknown

The Battle of Sabana Burro (Spanish: Batalla de Sabana Burro) was a major battle of the Dominican Restoration War. It was fought in Hato Mayor, at the junction of the Iguamo and Guamira rivers. Genaro Díaz was in charge of this battle, entering at dawn on May 4, 1864. The restorers sent a column to the center of the savannah to bombard the Spanish. (Genaro, who was known for his skillful handling of the saber during the long since concluded Dominican War of Independence, led a force of machete-wielding soldiers). In the end, the Dominicans defeated the Spanish, in which they acquired one of the two Spanish cannons.
