= Dominican Civil War (1911–1912) =

1911–1912 civil war in the Dominican Republic

Date	5 December 1911 – 30 November 1912 (11 months, 3 weeks and 4 days)
Location	Dominican Republic
Result	Rebel victory

Belligerents
(Dominican Republic) Dominican Government	Dominican rebels Supported by: Haiti; United States

Commanders and leaders
(Dominican Republic) Eladio Victoria; (Dominican Republic) Alfredo Victoria	Horacio Vásquez; Desiderio Arias

Casualties and losses
- 3,000 dead

The Dominican Civil War that lasted from 5 December 1911 until 30 November 1912 was the bloodiest in the history of the Dominican Republic. It began as an uprising in the northwest of the country. The United States considered military intervention, but it succeeded in negotiating a settlement without landing its forces. The war is sometimes known as the "War of the Quiquises", a nickname given to the rebels.

== Events ==
=== Assassination of Cáceres ===
On 19 November 1911, General Luis Tejera led a group of conspirators in an ambush on the horse-drawn carriage of President Ramón Cáceres. During the shootout, Cáceres was killed and Tejera wounded in the leg. The assassins fled in an automobile, which they soon crashed into a river. After rescuing Tejera from the water and depositing him in a hut by the road the other conspirators fled on foot. Tejera was found shortly after and summarily executed.

=== Civil war ===
In the ensuing power vacuum, General Alfredo Victoria, commander of the Dominican Army, seized control and forced the Congress to elect his uncle, Eladio Victoria, as the new interim president on 5 December 1911. The general was widely suspected of bribing the Congress, and his uncle, who took office officially as president on 27 February 1912, lacked legitimacy. The former president Horacio Vásquez soon returned from exile to lead his followers, the horacistas, in a popular uprising against the new government. He joined forces with the border caudillo General Desiderio Arias and by December the country was in a state of civil war. The violence prompted the United States to abandon the customs houses it operated on the Haitian border, despite the fact that they had not been targeted. The small American force that monitored the frontier to combat smuggling also withdrew, handing over responsibility for border defence to the Dominican Army. Men and weapons passed freely over the Haitian border to the rebels as the Haitian government tried to promote instability in its neighbour. On 12 April 1912, the American consul general, Thomas Cleland Dawson, reported that "the government has a well-equipped force in the field and could soon put down the rebellion on the northwestern frontier were it not for the effective aid they claim the Haitian government is giving it." General Arias's forces seized the customs houses and extorted loans from the peasants and plantation owners in the districts they controlled. The officers of the corrupt Dominican Army commonly pocketed their troops' pay and plundered the territories they were sent to subdue.

The chaotic situation was to the advantage of the military leadership of both sides, who enriched themselves at the people's expense. A report emanating from the American legation, dated 3 August, blamed the military for prolonging the conflict. Towards the end of September, the President of the United States, William Howard Taft, sent a commission to investigate options for obtaining peace. Taft did not seek the permission of the Dominican government, but did give them advance notice prior to the commission's arrival on 2 October. That same day the Dominican government decided to make 12 October an official holiday, the Día de Colón (Columbus Day), in an effort to please the Americans. An executive decree was published to this effect on 5 October. On 20 November the Dominican foreign minister suggested that other countries should adopt the holiday, so that "all the American nations would have a common holiday". The day is now celebrated as the Día de la Raza.

The American commission reported on 13 November that the military's self-interest and the rebels' confidence precluded any mutual agreement to end the fighting. The Taft administration then reduced its payouts to the Dominican government down to 45% of customs revenues, which was the floor established when Dominican customs came under American receivership through the convention of 1907. The United States further threatened to transfer formal recognition to the rebels and cede all the 45% of customs revenues to them unless President Victoria resigned. The presence of the U.S. Navy and 750 U.S. Marines gave force to the threat. Victoria announced his resignation on 26 November and stepped down as president on 30 November. American official met with the rebel leader, Vásquez, and Archbishop of Santo Domingo Adolfo Alejandro Nouel was appointed interim president on 30 November. Nouel was tasked with holding free elections, but Arias soon defied the government. After four months Nouel resigned and Congress elected as his successor Senator José Bordas Valdez, who took office on 14 April 1913. Valdez's sole concern was to remain president.

== See also ==
- Dominican Civil War (1914)
- United States occupation of the Dominican Republic (1916–1924)
- United States involvement in regime change
- Latin America–United States relations

== Sources ==
- Atkins, G. Pope; Wilson, Larman C. (1998). The Dominican Republic and the United States: From Imperialism to Transnationalism. Athens, GA: University of Georgia Press. ISBN 0820319317.
- Maurer, Noel (2013). The Empire Trap: The Rise and Fall of U.S. Intervention to Protect American Property Overseas, 1893–2013. Princeton: Princeton University Press. ISBN 9780691155821.
- Rachum, Ilan (2004). "Origins and Historical Significance of Día de la Raza". Revista Europea de Estudios Latinoamericanos y del Caribe. 76 (76): 61–81. doi:10.18352/erlacs.9685.
- Welles, Sumner (1928). Naboth's Vineyard: The Dominican Republic, 1844–1924. New York: Payson and Clarke.
