= Mount Olivet Cemetery (Detroit) =

Cemetery in Wayne County, Michigan

Coordinates: 42.419972°N 83.023682°W

- Interactive map of Mount Olivet Cemetery

Details
- Location: 17100 Van Dyke Ave., Detroit, Michigan, U.S.
- Size: 320 acres (130 ha)
- Find a Grave: Mount Olivet Cemetery

Mount Olivet Cemetery (usually abbreviated and stylized as Mt. Olivet Cemetery) is a cemetery at 17100 Van Dyke Avenue in the city of Detroit in Wayne County, Michigan. It is owned and operated by the Mt. Elliott Cemetery Association, a not-for-profit Catholic organization that is otherwise administered independently from the Roman Catholic Archdiocese of Detroit and any of the various Catholic religious orders active in Metro Detroit. At 320 acres (130 ha), it is the largest cemetery in Detroit, although it no longer promotes itself publicly as a Catholic establishment.

== Background ==
The organizational efforts for a new cemetery to be located at the outskirts of the city and to assist Mt. Elliott Cemetery in its mission to serve Catholic burial needs began in 1881, although it opened earlier than planned due to Detroit's recent population growth and the subsequent rapid acquisition of available burial space at Mt. Elliott—especially that reserved for single graves and poorer families. Named Mt. Olivet Cemetery, it became a "perpetual care" cemetery that ended up opening for interments of Catholics and their families in 1888. It quickly gained a reputation for being the final resting place of choice for many within recent immigrant communities specific to the Detroit area like Flemish Belgians, Germans, Italians, and Poles. By the 1950s, Mt. Olivet had 76 employees and was performing 24 burials per day. In 1987, Mayor Coleman Young and at least three Detroit City Council members explored the idea of acquiring the cemetery to expand the runway for what is now called Coleman A. Young International Airport—and also to reroute 6 Mile Road through it. Families of those interred there expressed outrage and indicated possible legal action (Young had already earned a reputation previously for controversially using eminent domain for economic development purposes in Poletown East). By 1990, there was a noticeable trend by area families to buy burial plots in suburban cemeteries, either out of convenience of location or due to the perception of increased crime within the city limits of Detroit (it is not immediately clear, however, if any of Young's past proposals for Mt. Olivet had had any impact on this). Regardless, by that point, Mt. Olivet had already pre-sold 98% of its available burial space. In 1998, Mt. Olivet ceased promoting itself as grounds designated solely for Catholics and their families.

== Present status ==
A 2008 article by The Detroit News noted that though the cemetery continued to average approximately 1,200 burials per year (a significant number, albeit far fewer than in the 1950s), it also had about 100 annual disinterments—mostly by surviving descendants who were moving their deceased relatives' remains to suburban locations, especially Resurrection Cemetery in Clinton Township (which is also operated by the Mt. Elliott Cemetery Association). The article surmised that while there could possibly be similar movements in other large American cities, it seemed likely to have a particularly pronounced effect with Detroit cemeteries—with Mt. Olivet specifically shouldering the bulk of the disinterments from the city. In addition to gaining newly available burial space from these disinterments, under some circumstances Mt. Olivet also reserves limited rights to reclaim unused spaces that it had previously sold. Also, some spaces that have already hosted single burials may still be used again by certificate holders, if applicable—either for double-depth burials of caskets, or for one casket with up to two urns installed above it.

== Special reserved plots ==
Although the cemetery consists largely of individual burial spaces and family plots, the cemetery does have multiple plots reserved exclusively for members of certain Catholic religious orders—all located in the cemetery's Section 47 with the exception of the Society of the Sacred Heart, which instead retains the rights to plots within Section 45—and a Polish mutual aid veterans' organization, in Section E.

Name
Bon Secours Sisters
Congregation of Our Lady of Charity of the Good Shepherd
Daughters of Charity of Saint Vincent de Paul
De La Salle Brothers
Felician Sisters
Jesuits
Polish Army Veterans' Association in America
School Sisters of Notre Dame
Sisters of the Sacred Hearts of Jesus and Mary
Society of the Sacred Heart

== Notable individual interments ==
The cemetery has 400,000 graves in it, including the remains of numerous famous people. Some of the more heavily attended graveside services held at Mt. Olivet over the years occurred after polarizing deaths, like those of Wladyslawa "Lottie" Lorenc (in 1923) and Jerry Buckley (who in 1930 was buried just 100 yards away from where his alleged assassin, Thomas Licavoli, would later be interred). Mt. Olivet also hosts three British Commonwealth war graves: one Canadian Royal Air Force cadet and two Canadian soldiers from World War I. In addition, five people who survived the sinking of the Titanic were later laid to rest at Mt. Olivet.

Name	Reason for notoriety
Jimmy Barrett	Major League Baseball player
Jerry Buckley	assassinated radio journalist
Shorty Cantlon	auto racing competitor
Salvatore Catalanotte	Detroit Partnership crime boss
Robert H. Clancy	Congressman
Leo Diegel	multi-time PGA Championship winner
Rose Gacioch	multi-time All-American Girls Professional Baseball League All-Star Team member
Shorty Gallagher	one-season Major League Baseball player
Joseph A. Glowin	Medal of Honor recipient
Joe Hunter	multi-time Grammy Award winner
Joe Lafata	Major League Baseball player
John Lesinski Sr.	Congressman
Thomas Licavoli	The Purple Gang member
Thaddeus M. Machrowicz	Congressman
Clarence J. McLeod	Congressman
Patrick V. McNamara	U.S. senator
Cass Michaels	multi-time Major League Baseball All-Star Team member
George D. O'Brien	Congressman
Louis C. Rabaut	Congressman
Joe Russo	auto racing competitor
George G. Sadowski	Congressman
Thomas Patrick Thornton	U.S. district court judge
Tom Tyler	actor
Maurice Van Robays	Major League Baseball player
Joseph Zerilli	Detroit Partnership crime boss
Zeke Zettner	The Stooges member
