= Battle of Las Trencheras =

Battle on June 27, 1916

Battle of Trencheras
- Part of the Banana Wars
Date	June 27, 1916
Location	Santiago, Dominican Republic
Result	American victory

Belligerents
United States	Dominican Republic

Commanders and leaders
(United States) Joseph Henry Pendleton	(Dominican Republic) Desiderio Arias

Casualties and losses
5 killed; 4 wounded	5 killed

The Battle of Trencheras was fought on June 27, 1916, between Dominican militias and U.S. Marines during the United States occupation of the Dominican Republic.

== Battle ==
The battle occurred at Las Trencheras, two ridges, which had been fortified by the Dominicans and long thought to be invulnerable, since a Spanish army had been defeated there in 1864. There the Dominican troops had dug trenches on two hills, one behind the other, blocking the road to Santiago. The field guns of Captain Chandler Campbell's 13th Company, along with a machine gun platoon, took position on a hill commanding the enemy trenches and opened fire at 08:00 hours. Under the cover of this fire, the Marines launched a bayonet charge on the defenders' first line of defense, covered until the last possible moment by the artillery barrage. The Marines came under heavy but inaccurate rifle fire, which caused some casualties. The Dominican troops were forced to retreat to their trenches on the second hill. They rallied there briefly, then broke and had to retreat again as the American field guns resumed their shelling of the hill. Within 45 minutes from the opening artillery shots, the Marines had forced the Dominicans to fall back.
