= Battle of Arroyo Bermejo =

1863 battle of the Dominican Restoration War

- Part of the Dominican Restoration War
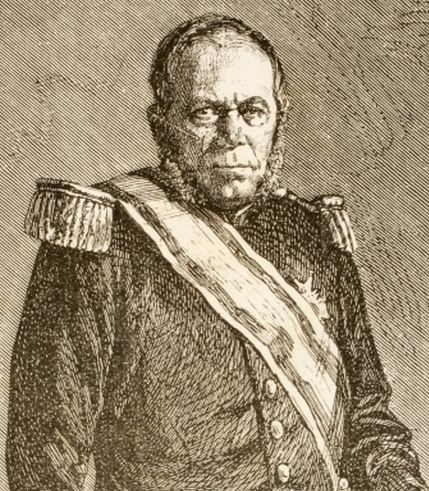
Date	September 23, 1863
Location	Monte Plata, Captaincy General of Santo Domingo
Result	Dominican victory

Belligerents
Kingdom of Spain	Dominican Republic

Commanders and leaders
(Spain) Pedro Santana	(Dominican Republic) Gregorio Luperón (Dominican Republic) Dionisio Troncoso (Dominican Republic) Santiago Mota (Dominican Republic) Pedro Faustino Royer (Dominican Republic) Olegario Tenares

Strength
1,500 soldiers 2 artillery pieces	Unknown

The Battle of Arroyo Bermejo (Spanish: Batalla de Arroyo Bermejo), also known as the Combat of Arroyo Bermejo or Action of Arroyo Bermejo, was a military engagement that took place on September 29, 1863, in Monte Plata, during the Dominican Restoration War, between Spanish troops led by Lieutenant General Pedro Santana and Dominican forces led by General Gregorio Luperón. The engagement ended in a Dominican victory, forcing the Spanish forces to withdraw toward Santo Domingo.

== See also ==
- Battle of Guayacanes
- Battle of Jura
- Pedro Santana
