= Guamira River =

River in the Dominican Republic

Coordinates: 18.766°N 69.316°W

The Guamira River (Spanish: Río Guamira) flows through Hato Mayor Province of the Dominican Republic.
