= Battle of Puerto Plata =

1916 battle in the Dominican Republic

- Part of the Banana Wars
Date	June 1, 1916
Location	Puerto Plata, Dominican Republic
Result	U.S. victory

Belligerents
United States	(Dominican Republic) Dominican rebels

Commanders and leaders
(United States) Roscoe Bulmer (United States) Captain Hirshinger †	(Dominican Republic) General Rey

Strength
133; 2 machine guns	500

Casualties and losses
1 killed, several wounded	1 fort captured

The Battle of Puerto Plata was fought on June 1, 1916, between Dominican rebels and U.S. Marines during the Banana Wars.

== Battle ==
On June 1, 133 Marines from New Jersey and Rhode Island landed near Puerto Plata, Dominican Republic to assault Fort San Felipe, held by 500 rebels. The initial plan was for a surprise dawn attack, but Major Charles Hatch reported that the rebels were warned and American nationals evacuated before the assault. The rebels, fortified in the fort and nearby buildings, vowed to resist the landing.

As the Marines approached, they faced heavy sniper fire from the waterfront. With casualties already mounting, the gunboat Sacramento opened fire with its small cannon, which helped suppress enemy fire. However, the Marines encountered more trouble when their steam launch ran aground near the shore, forcing them to wade through the surf under fire. Despite this, they reached the beach and stormed the fort, taking it at bayonet point.

The rebels retreated through the town, maintaining harassing fire again the Marines. The gunboat provided artillery support as the Marines advanced uphill, eventually forcing the rebels to abandon their position at a hospital, which had been fortified. The battle resulted in several casualties but successfully secured the fort and the surrounding area.
