= Harold A. Knapp =

American mathematician

- Died: November 11, 1989 (aged 65); Germantown, Md
- Citizenship: United States
- Awards: Secretary of Defense Meritorious Civilian Service Award (March 1989)
- Scientific career
- Fields: Mathematics, Physics, Radiation protection, Defense

Harold Anthony Knapp was an American mathematician. He earned a doctorate in mathematics with a minor in physics at the Massachusetts Institute of Technology in 1947. He first worked as an operations analyst within the Office of the Chief of Naval Operations. He joined the US Atomic Energy Commission in 1955, where he worked within the newly formed Fallout Studies Branch within the Division of Biology and Medicine from 1960 on; he resigned from the AEC in 1963. He then worked for the Institute for Defense Analyses "which did highly sensitive studies on nuclear warfare for the Joint Chiefs of Staff, the Office of the Secretary of Defense, and the Defense Nuclear Agency". In 1981, "he joined the Joint Program Office in the Department of Defense, whose innocuous title hid the awesome responsibility of designing and putting into effect a system that would assure the continuity of government during nuclear war."

== Awards ==
- Oliver Wendell Holmes Award from the American Civil Liberties Union
- Secretary of Defense Meritorious Civilian Service Award (March 1989)

== Bibliography ==
=== The Iodine-131 contamination of Utahans from radioactive fallout ===
- "The Contribution of Short Lived Isotopes and Hot Spots to Radiation Exposure in the United States from Nuclear Test Fallout", NTA, NV00019168, June 6, 1960
- "Iodine-131 in Fresh Milk and Human Thyroids Following a Single Deposition of Nuclear Test Fallout", TLD-19266, Health and Safety, TID-4500, 24th ed. (Washington, D.C., 1 June 1963)
- "Iodine-131 in Fresh Milk and Human Thyroids following a Single Deposition of Nuclear Test Fall-Out", Nature, 9 May 1964, 534–7
- "Computation of the Radiation Dose Which Might Have Accrued Had the Nuclear Cloud from the 42.7 KT Simon Shot of April 25, 1953, Experienced a Rainout at a Distance of 120 Miles from the Nevada Test Site Similar to the Rainout Which Occurred 36 Hours After Detonation in the Vicinity of Troy, New York", October 6, 1982. Material submitted in evidence at the Allen trial.

=== The Giles-Johnson rape case ===
- "A Report to the Governor of Maryland: Request for Full Pardon for Three Citizens of Montgomery County Awaiting Execution in the Maryland Penitentiary", July 6, 1963
- Harold Knapp, editorial for Gaithersburg Gazette, June 4, 1964, Giles-Johnson Defense Committee, Series VI, Box 13, from the Maryland Room University of Maryland Archives.

== See also ==
- Edward B. Lewis
- Linus Pauling
- Ernest Sternglass
- John Gofman
