= Broadwell, Illinois =

- Village
- Location in Logan County, Illinois

- Location of Illinois in the United States
- Coordinates: 40°04′01″N 89°26′34″W
- Country: United States
- State: Illinois
- County: Logan
- Township: Broadwell

Area
  - Total: 0.18 sq mi (0.47 km^{2})
  - Land: 0.18 sq mi (0.47 km^{2})
  - Water: 0 sq mi (0.00 km^{2})
- Elevation: 587 ft (179 m)

Population (2020)
  - Total: 136
  - Density: 756.9/sq mi (292.23/km^{2})
- Time zone: UTC-6 (CST)
  - Summer (DST): UTC-5 (CDT)
- ZIP Code: 62634
- Area code: 217
- FIPS code: 17-08472
- GNIS feature ID: 2397462
- Wikimedia Commons: Broadwell, Illinois

Broadwell is a village in Logan County, Illinois, United States. The population was 136 at the 2020 census.

== History ==
The village of Broadwell was platted in 1856 by William Broadwell and Jacob Eisiminger, which occurred in conjunction with the construction of the railroad linking Chicago and Springfield.

Prior to the plat of the village, there was an inn three-quarters of a mile east of the present site, called "Tantivy" or "TAN-TI-VY". The name apparently derives from an old English hunting cry. Tantivy Lodge was in existence from about 1840 through the early 1950s; tradition states that Abraham Lincoln stopped there while traveling from Springfield to the Logan County courthouse at Postville (today a part of the newer city of Lincoln, Illinois) while Lincoln rode the judicial circuit as a lawyer. It is recorded (with greater certainty) that the (later) central Illinois cattle and land baron, John Dean Gillett, proposed marriage to his future wife, Lemira Parke, at the Tantivy cabin c. 1840. It is likely that Tantivy was relocated by about one-eighth of a mile (from east to west) at least once during its existence.

When Jacob Eisiminger was offered the honor of having the village named after him, he declined, stating that the new village would be handicapped with such an unusual name; accordingly, it was named Broadwell. William Broadwell (of Springfield) owned the original land, but had very little further connection with the village, and he later moved to Kansas; the Eisiminger family, however, were long-time merchants, postmasters and schoolteachers in the village. Leola Eisiminger, the last member of the family bearing this name, died on August 16, 2005.

Broadwell became a shipping point for hogs, corn, wheat and later soybeans. The village and township has never known any great period of economic boom or bust. The surrounding Broadwell Township features some of the finest productive agricultural soils in North America.

The village was located directly on historic U.S. Route 66, from 1926 to 1978; today the limited-access Interstate 55 is located on the western edge of the village. There is a full interstate exit for the village and township. The former northbound lane of U.S. Route 66 remains intact, and it still serves the village as a major local road and tourist magnet.

Broadwell featured the well-known "Pig Hip" Restaurant, operated by Ernest L. ("Ernie") Edwards and family from 1937 through 1991. Edwards recently received the citation for "The BEST U.S. Route 66 attraction where the ORIGINAL GUY is still there". Until recently, the Pig Hip building was still open as a museum of Route 66 memorabilia, with Ernie Edwards (born August 5, 1917) as the host. The restaurant/museum and most of its contents were destroyed by fire on March 5, 2007. Ernie operated a small museum from his adjacent residence until late 2010, and he died in nearby Lincoln on April 11, 2012. He retained his wits and memory to the very end of life, and was a fount of Route 66 stories and information. On June 9, 1990, Ernie became an inaugural inductee into the Route 66 Hall of Fame of Illinois.

A bronze and stone memorial dedicated to the Pig Hip Restaurant and to U.S. Route 66 was unveiled by Ernie Edwards on August 5, 2007. The large boulder and bronze marker were presented to Ernie by his family, friends, and neighbors on the occasion of his 90th birthday.

The village and township of Broadwell sent two of its native sons to the Illinois General Assembly during the late twentieth century. John R. ("Jack") Lauer served as state representative from 1973 to 1978, and Robert F. ("Bob") Olson served as state representative from 1986 to 1994. Both men farmed locally for many years.

== Geography ==
Broadwell is located in southwestern Logan County. Interstate 55 passes through the western side of the village, with access from Exit 119. I-55 leads northeast 7 miles (11 km) to Lincoln, the county seat, and 41 miles (66 km) to Bloomington, while to the southwest it leads 25 miles (40 km) to Springfield, the state capital.

According to the 2021 census gazetteer files, Broadwell has a total area of 0.18 square miles (0.47 km^{2}), all land.

== Demographics ==
Historical population
Census	Pop.	Note	%±
1870	194		—
1880	214		10.3%
1890	231		7.9%
1900	202		−12.6%
1910	246		21.8%
1920	209		−15.0%
1930	186		−11.0%
1940	144		−22.6%
1950	149		3.5%
1960	173		16.1%
1970	159		−8.1%
1980	183		15.1%
1990	146		−20.2%
2000	169		15.8%
2010	145		−14.2%
2020	136		−6.2%
U.S. Decennial Census

As of the 2020 census there were 136 people, 86 households, and 53 families residing in the village. The population density was 755.56 inhabitants per square mile (291.72/km^{2}). There were 73 housing units at an average density of 405.56 per square mile (156.59/km^{2}). The racial makeup of the village was 85.29% White, 0.00% African American, 1.47% Native American, 0.00% Asian, 0.00% Pacific Islander, 0.00% from other races, and 13.24% from two or more races. Hispanic or Latino of any race were 5.15% of the population.

There were 86 households, out of which 16.3% had children under the age of 18 living with them, 52.33% were married couples living together, 6.98% had a female householder with no husband present, and 38.37% were non-families. 25.58% of all households were made up of individuals, and 1.16% had someone living alone who was 65 years of age or older. The average household size was 2.70 and the average family size was 2.19.

The village's age distribution consisted of 18.1% under the age of 18, 6.9% from 18 to 24, 26.1% from 25 to 44, 35.5% from 45 to 64, and 13.3% who were 65 years of age or older. The median age was 44.7 years. For every 100 females, there were 91.8 males. For every 100 females age 18 and over, there were 100.0 males.

The median income for a household in the village was $56,607, and the median income for a family was $55,625. Males had a median income of $55,500 versus $32,083 for females. The per capita income for the village was $26,613. About 28.3% of families and 27.1% of the population were below the poverty line, including 32.4% of those under age 18 and 4.0% of those age 65 or over.

== Education ==
Its school districts are West Lincoln-Broadwell Elementary School District 92 and Lincoln Community High School District 404.
