= USS Knapp =

Fletcher-class destroyer

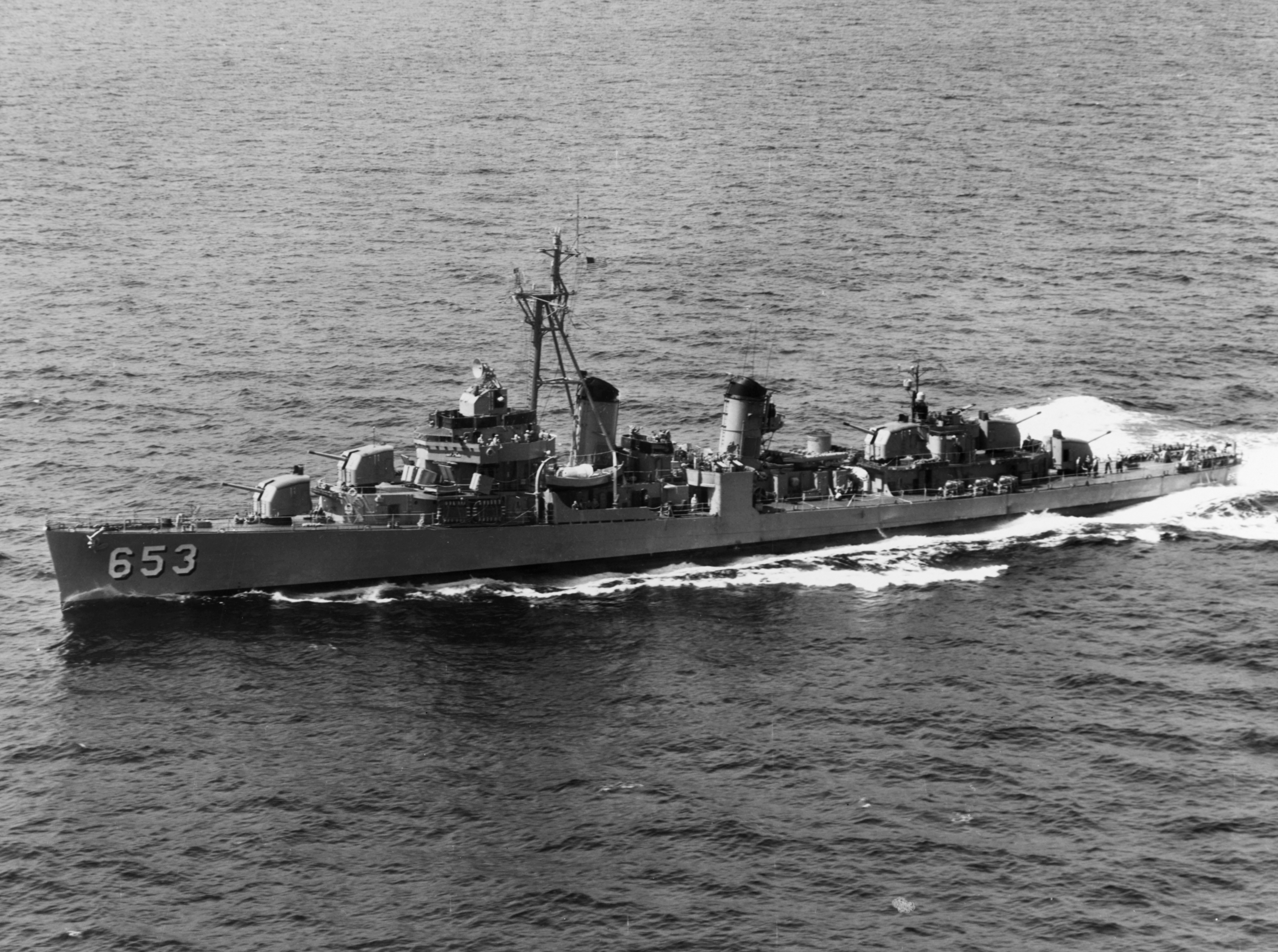
- USS Knapp (DD-653) underway in 1955

History

United States
- Namesake: Harry Shepard Knapp
- Builder: Bath Iron Works
- Laid down: 8 March 1943
- Launched: 10 July 1943
- Commissioned: 16 September 1943
- Decommissioned: 4 March 1957
- Stricken: 6 March 1972
- Fate: Scrapped, 27 August 1973, but bridge restored and on display at Columbia River Maritime Museum

General characteristics
- Class & type: Fletcher-class destroyer
- Displacement: 2,050 tons
- Length: 376 ft 6 in (114.7 m)
- Beam: 39 ft 8 in (12.1 m)
- Draft: 17 ft 9 in (5.4 m)
- Propulsion: 60,000 shp (45 MW); 2 propellers
- Speed: 35 knots (65 km/h; 40 mph)
- Range: 6500 nm at 15 kn (12,000 km at 28 km/h)
- Complement: 319
- Armament: 5 × 5-inch 38 caliber guns, 4 × 40 mm AA guns, 4 × 20 mm AA guns, 10 × 21 inch (533 mm) torpedo tubes, 6 × depth charge projectors, 2 × depth charge tracks

USS Knapp (DD-653), a Fletcher-class destroyer, was the only ship of the United States Navy to be named for Harry Shepard Knapp a Vice Admiral of the United States Navy and Military Governor of Santo Domingo. Her keel was laid down on 8 March 1943 by Bath Iron Works, in Bath, Maine. She was launched on 10 July 1943, sponsored by Margaret L. and Mary C. Knapp and commissioned on 16 September 1943.

== Service history ==
=== World War II ===
After shakedown off Bermuda, Knapp departed Boston on 26 November 1943 for the Pacific Ocean, arriving Pearl Harbor on 21 December. She departed Pearl Harbor on 16 January 1944 with the aircraft carriers of Admiral Marc Mitscher's Task Force 58, headed for the Marshall Islands invasion. At sea from 16 January to 12 February when she put into Majuro, Knapp also shelled Kwajalein. She continued her screening as carriers launched raids on Truk from 16 to 17 February and on bases in the Mariana Islands from 21 February to 22 February, then sailed from Majuro to Espiritu Santo to screen carriers providing air cover for the seizure of Emirau Island from 20 March to 25 March and raiding the Palau Islands, Yap and Woleai from 30 March to 1 April.

She returned to Majuro on 6 April 1944 and a week later sortied with heavy ships for the Hollandia landings of 21–24 April, and air raids on Truk, Satawan and Ponape at the end of the month.

Following replenishment at Majuro in May, Knapp screened carriers during operations against Saipan. On 19 June, Knapp guarded her force during the momentous air Battle of the Philippine Sea in which Japan's air power was significantly depleted. From 25 July to 5 August, she continued her screening in the raids on Palau, Ulithi, Yap, Iwo Jima and Chichi Jima during which she Joined in the surface gunfire which sank several ships of a Japanese convoy earlier attacked by carrier aircraft. Knapp refitted at Eniwetok on 11 August to 30 August.

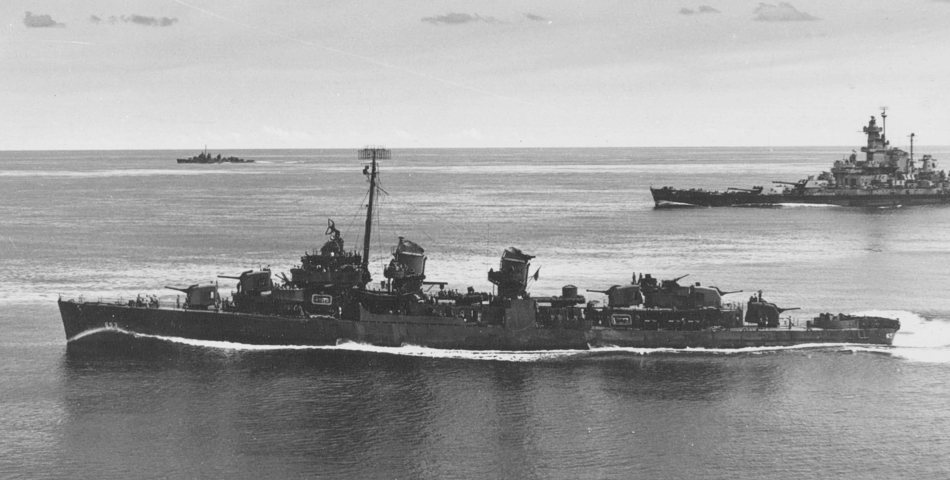
Knapp and USS Alabama (BB-60) with TF 58.3 in April 1944.

Knapp steamed out of Eniwetok for the invasion of the Palau Islands on 30 August, screening five battleships and later rendezvousing with Langley, Lexington, Essex and Princeton before their strikes at targets in the Palaus during actions on Peleliu. During September, Knapp screened heavy ships making strikes at the Philippine Islands, and on 6 October she sailed from Ulithi for the airstrikes on Okinawa and Formosa in preparation for the Leyte landings and provided anti-aircraft cover for her group during the Formosa air battle of 12–14 October. After guarding the retirement of the Canberra, which had been struck by an aerial torpedo on 13 October, she rejoined her group for airstrikes on Luzon and screening during the Battle of Surigao Strait, one phase of the Battle of Leyte Gulf. She returned to Ulithi on 30 October and two days later headed back to the Philippines. After Reno was damaged on 3 November by two torpedoes from Japanese submarine I-41, Knapp guarded her withdrawal. From November 1944 to January 1945, Knapp screened airstrikes on Luzon, French Indochina and cities on the China coast neutralizing Japanese bases in preparation for the Lingayen invasion. Escorting Ticonderoga which was damaged by air and kamikaze attack on 21 January, Knapp arrived in Ulithi 24 January 1945 with the crippled carrier. The destroyer sailed on 30 January for the West Coast, arriving on 20 February for an overhaul.

Knapp sailed for the Western Pacific on 23 April arriving off Okinawa on 27 May 1945. She serving as a radar picket ship until 26 June. Three days later she Joined carrier Task Force 39 for the final series of raids against the Japanese home islands. Following the end of fighting 15 August, Knapp arrived in Sagami Wan, Honshū, on 27 August and sailed into Tokyo Bay on 1 September for the surrender ceremonies aboard Missouri on 2 September. During the early days of the occupation, she helped demilitarize Japanese midget submarine and suicide boat bases.

She sailed for the United States on 5 December and arrived at San Diego on 21 December 1945. Shortly after Knapp sailed via the Panama Canal for Boston arriving 17 January 1946, then Charleston, South Carolina, on 2 April and was decommissioned 5 July 1946.

=== Cold War ===
Knapp recommissioned on 3 May 1951 when the outbreak of the Korean War necessitated more naval vessels. She served in the Atlantic Fleet working out of Newport, Rhode Island. She cruised in the Caribbean Sea from 20 July to 13 September when she pulled into Charleston, where she was refitted with modern equipment then sailed 4 February 1952 with a task force to England, Norway, and Germany. She made a voyage to the Mediterranean Sea on 22 November visiting ports in Italy, Turkey and Spain. Knapp transited the Straits of Gibraltar on 26 January 1953 and overhauled at Boston until 10 August 1953, when she deployed with Destroyer Division 182 for a world cruise. Her cruise was delayed when she arrived in the Far East. She patrolled the Korean coast with Task Force 77 until 14 January 1954 when she resumed her cruise via Hong Kong, Singapore, Colombo, Aden, Saudi Arabia, Suez Canal, visited Port Said, Naples, Barcelona, Lisbon, Bermuda and arrived Fall River, Massachusetts, on 10 March 1954.

Knapp sailed from Newport for San Diego, arriving on 15 December. She got underway on 4 January 1955 for the Western Pacific, and patrolled the East China Sea and the Formosa Straits until June, when she returned to San Diego on 19 June 1955. After operations along the California coast, she returned to the Far East on 27 January 1956, visited ports of Kobe, Subic Bay, Buckner Bay and patrolled the Formosa Straits before returning San Diego on 31 May 1956. She operated along the California coast, entering Long Beach Naval Shipyard on 4 September for overhaul. Knapp was decommissioned on 4 March 1957 and assigned to the Long Beach Group, Pacific Reserve Fleet.

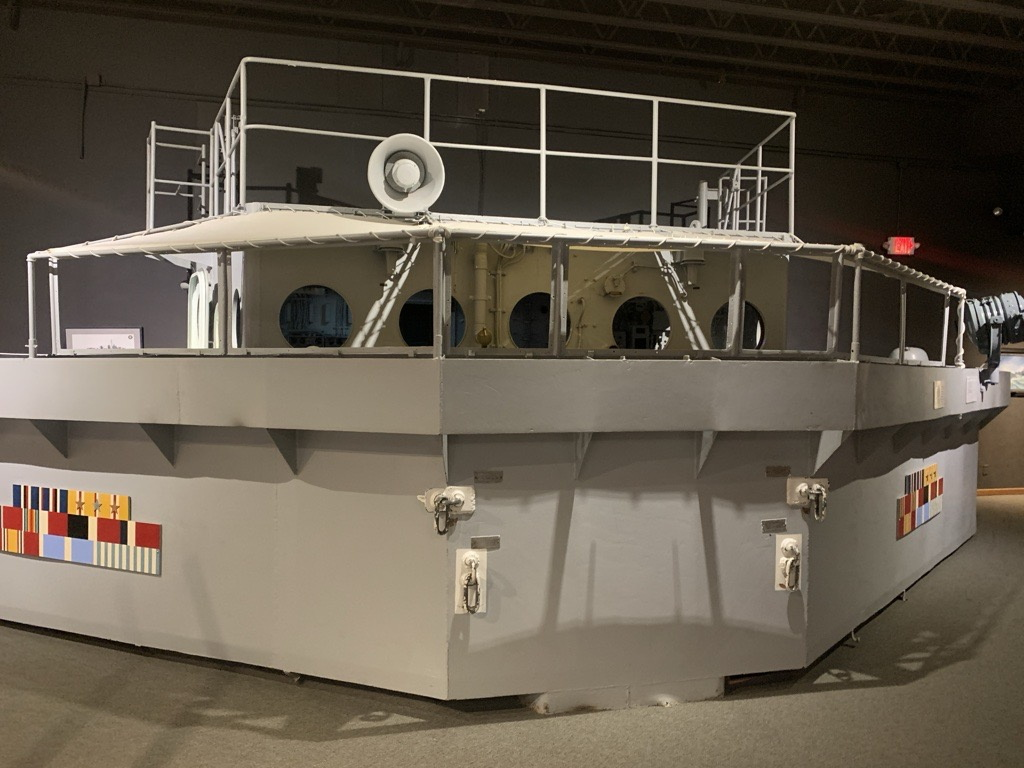
Extant bridge of Knapp

The bridge of the Knapp is on display at the Columbia River Maritime Museum in Astoria, Oregon.

== Honors ==
Knapp received eight battle stars for World War II service.
