= Battle of Guayacanes (1863) =

1863 battle of the Dominican Restoration War

- Part of the Dominican Restoration War
Date	August 22, 1863
Location	Guayacanes, Dominican Republic
Result	Dominican victory

Belligerents
Dominican Republic	Kingdom of Spain

Commanders and leaders
(Dominican Republic) Gaspar Polanco (Dominican Republic) Benito Monción (Dominican Republic) Pedro Antonio Pimentel	(Spain) José de los Rios (Spain) Alejandro Robles † (Spain) Florentino Garcia † (Spain) Valentín Dañoveitia †

Strength
Unknown	Unknown; 2 artillery pieces

The Battle of Guayacanes (Spanish: Batalla de Guayacanes de 1863) was a battle of the Dominican Restoration War that took place on August 22, 1863 and lasted several hours. A Spanish column advancing toward Santiago was engaged by Dominican forces near Guayacanes. Dominicans opened the battle with rifle fire; Spanish troops launched several assaults on Dominican defensive positions but were repelled, and the battle devolved into hand-to-hand combat with bayonets and machetes. After suffering casualties, the Spanish force withdrew toward Santiago.
