= José Bordas Valdez =

Dominican politician (1874–1968)

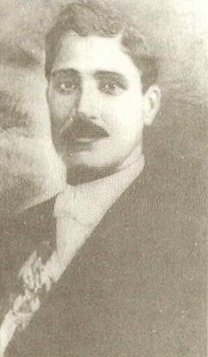

President of the Dominican Republic
- In office April 14, 1913 – August 27, 1914
- Preceded by: Adolfo Alejandro Nouel
- Succeeded by: Ramón Báez

Personal details
- Born: August 6, 1874 Santiago de los Caballeros, Dominican Republic
- Died: July 12, 1968 (aged 93) Santo Domingo, Dominican Republic
- Profession: Former Provisional President of the Dominican Republic

José Bordas Valdez (August 6, 1874 – July 12, 1968) was a politician from the Dominican Republic. He served as the 2nd provisional president of the Dominican Republic from April 14, 1913, until August 27, 1914. He was born in Santiago de los Caballeros. During his government he had to face the "Railroad Revolution".

== Biography ==
His political career began with the coup on April 26, 1902, against the administration of President Juan Isidro Jimenes, and Bordas then had a position among those selected, Commander of Arms of Mao, and later of Dajabón. While he was there, the movement against the government of President Horacio Vásquez took place, called the Seven Months Insurrection. Bordas assumed the role of fighting the rebel forces led with the strongest guerrillas in the region. He was governor of Santiago in 1904, of San Pedro de Macorís and of Puerto Plata in 1907.

== Provisional presidency ==
Upon the resignation of President Adolfo Nouel, Congress met to choose his replacement, but political divisions prevented it from selecting one of the three proposed candidates: Horacio Vásquez, Juan Isidro Jimenes and Federico Velázquez. Faced with this situation, Bordas, as a politician independent of the parties, was elected and assumed the provisional presidency in April 1913. Then conflicts arose with the Horacistas who wanted to take advantage of the coming struggles and face the opponent from Jimenez. The so-called Two-Month Revolution broke out.

The uprising or "Railroad Revolution" was put down by President Bordas with the support of the forces of General Desiderio Arias; however, he was forced to commit to holding elections and appointing some influential Horacists to public office.

== Presidency (1913-1914) ==
In the midst of a turbulent situation, President Bordas organized and held elections on June 15, 1914, in which he was victorious through fraud, changing votes at the polls, repressing political rallies and imprisoning opponents. These elections, given the prevailing public disorder, were only held in 5 of the 12 provinces into which the country was then divided. Faced with the advance of the insurgents and the loss of support from the North American government, Bordas had to resign to make way for the provisional government of Ramón Báez, on August 27, 1914.
