= Joseph A. Glowin =

United States Marine Corps Medal of Honor recipient

Joseph Anthony Glowin
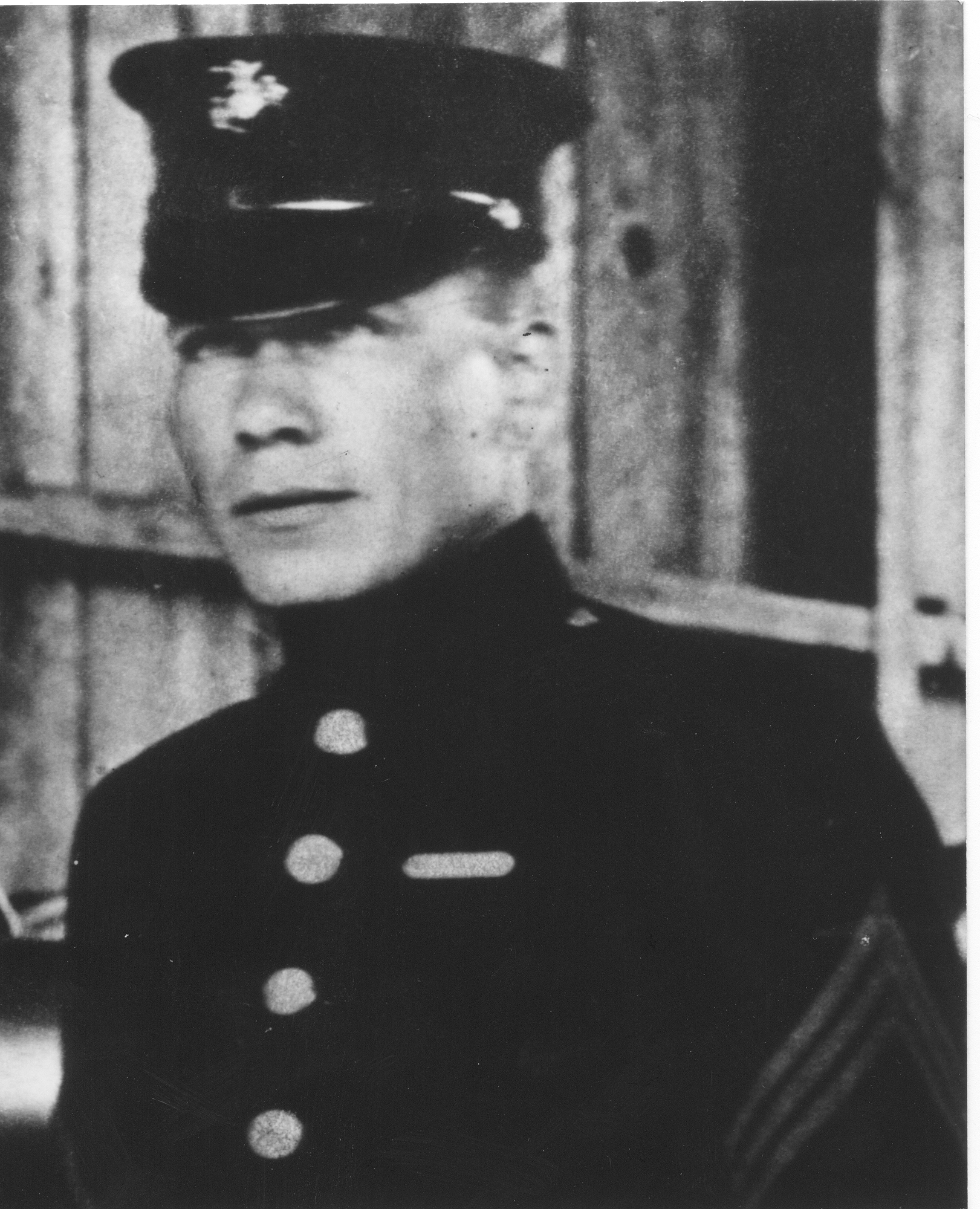
- Joseph A. Glowin, Medal of Honor recipient
- Born: March 14, 1892; Detroit, Michigan, U.S.
- Died: August 22, 1952 (aged 60)
- Burial place: Mount Olivet Cemetery; Detroit, Michigan, U.S.
- Military career
- Allegiance: United States
- Branch: United States Marine Corps
- Service years: 1913–1919
- Rank: Gunnery Sergeant (temporary); Private
- Units: 13th Company, Artillery Battalion, 1st Brigade
- Conflicts: Occupation of Haiti (1915); Dominican Republic*; World War I
- Awards: Medal of Honor (1916)
- Other work: Detroit Police Department

Joseph Anthony Glowin (March 14, 1892 – August 22, 1952) was a United States Marine who received the Medal of Honor for heroism in combat in the Dominican Republic in 1916.

== Biography ==
Glowin was born in Detroit, Michigan, on March 14, 1892. He enlisted in the United States Marine Corps in Lansing, Michigan, during December 1913 and took part in the expedition to Vera Cruz, Mexico, from April to November 1914.

During the following year, he participated in engagements in the Republic of Haiti during September and November 1915. In 1916, Cpl Glowin deployed to the Dominican Republic with the 13th Company, Artillery Battalion, 1st Brigade.

Corporal Glowin, a machine gunner, was deep into the jungle of Santo Domingo, near Guayacanas, on July 3, 1916, with a small detachment of Marines. Cpl Glowin and his fellow Marines encountered a strong row of bandit trenches manned by a superior force. The Marines were in the open, their only course lay in a direct frontal attack. Cpl Glowin, although hit by enemy fire, remained at his post, fighting off the enemy until wounded again and forced by his comrades to get medical aid. He was awarded the Nation's highest military decoration, the Medal of Honor, for his heroism at Guayacanas.

Glowin remained in the Dominican Republic until June 1917 where he was promoted to the rank of gunnery sergeant (temporary). He was honorably discharged on December 8, 1917. He reenlisted ten days later for the duration of World War I, but because his previous ranks had all been temporary warrants, he was later honorably discharged a second time at his permanent rank of private on September 6, 1919. He later served with the Detroit Police Department from 1923 until 1941.

Joseph Glowin died on August 22, 1952, aged 60, and was buried in Mount Olivet Cemetery in Detroit.

== Medal of Honor citation ==
Rank and organization: Corporal, U .S. Marine Corps. Born: March 14, 1892, Detroit, Mich. Accredited to: Michigan. G.O. NO.: 244, October 30, 1916.

Citation:

During an engagement at Guayacanas on 3 July 1916, Cpl. Glowin participated in action against a considerable force of rebels on the line of march.

== See also ==
- List of Medal of Honor recipients
