= Desiderio Arias =

Dominican soldier and caudillo

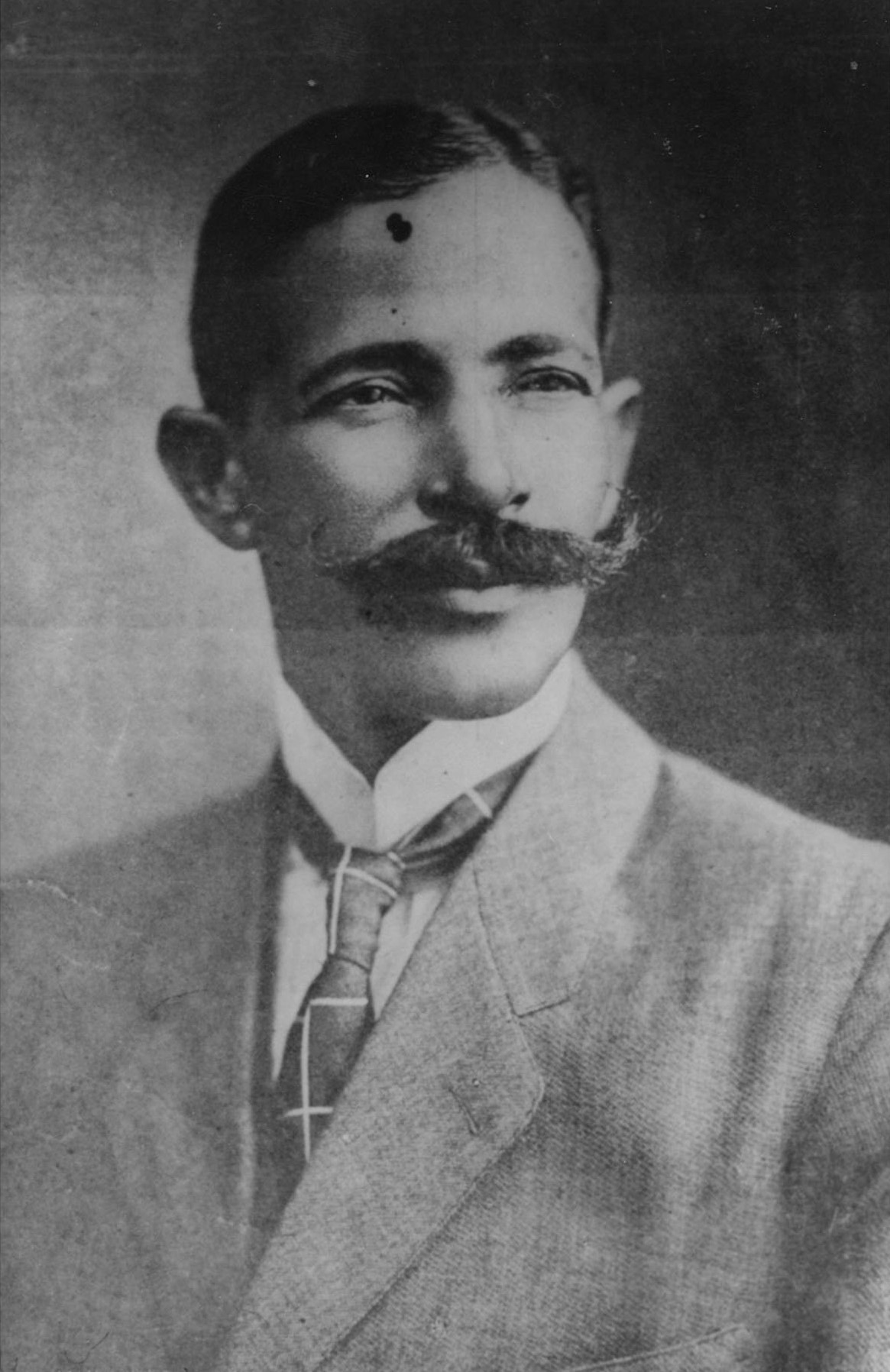
- Born: 1872; Monte Cristi, Dominican Republic
- Died: 1931 (aged 58–59) Mao, Dominican Republic
- Conflicts: Dominican Civil War (1911–1912); Dominican Civil War (1914); Battle of Las Trencheras; Battle of Guayacanas

Desiderio Arias Álvarez (1872–1931) was a notable soldier and caudillo who gained a significant following throughout the northern band of the Dominican Republic, especially in the Montecristi region. He was killed by Rafael Trujillo's forces.

== Early years ==
He was born in 1872, near Montecristi. His parents were Tomas Arias and María Eugenia Álvarez, and his brothers, Evangelista and Francisco. Arias was born during the fourth government of Buenaventura Báez. While still young, he moved to Montecristi, where he soon began working with his relative Juan Isidro Jiménes in the commercial house of J.I. Jiménez & CIA.

== Introduction to the militia ==
Arias began his military career with Horacio Vásquez and Ramón Cáceres. Because of his performance and connections, President Juan Isidro Jimenes Pereyra appointed him to the position of regional assistant.

== Political beginnings ==
On 1 January 1902, Arias married Simeona Castro, better known as Pomona, sister of the general Andrés Navarro, a known politician and military caudillo of the northwestern band, and one of the key supporters of President Jimenes.
