= Military Government of Santo Domingo =

Occupation of the Dominican Republic by the United States from 1916–1924

Military Government of Santo Domingo Gobierno Militar de Santo Domingo (Spanish)
- Occupied territory of the United States
- 1916–1924
- Flag of the United States

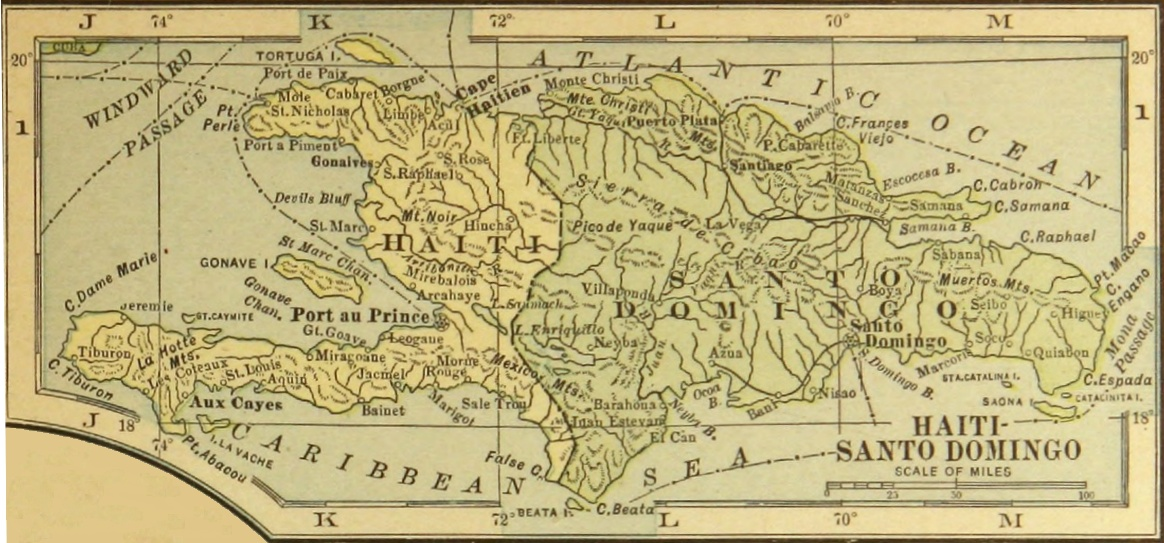
- Santo Domingo (to the right)

Anthem
- Salve, Columbia "Hail, Columbia"
- Capital: Santo Domingo
- Demonym: Dominican
- Government
  - Type: Military government
  - Motto: E Pluribus Unum "Out of Many, One"
- Military Governor
  - 1916–1917 (first): Harry Shepard Knapp
  - 1917–1924 (last): Edwin Anderson Jr
- Historical era: Banana Wars
  - Established: 15 May 1916
  - Horacio Vásquez becomes president, Dominican self-governance reestablished: 12 July 1924
  - U.S. forces withdraw: 18 September 1924
Preceded by	Succeeded by
Second Dominican Republic	Third Dominican Republic

The Military Government of Santo Domingo (Spanish: Gobierno Militar de Santo Domingo) was a provisional military government established during the American occupation of the Dominican Republic that lasted from May 15, 1916 to September 18, 1924. The United States aimed to force the Dominicans to repay their large debts to European creditors, whose governments threatened military intervention. On May 13, 1916, Rear Admiral William B. Caperton forced the Dominican Republic's Secretary of War Desiderio Arias, who had seized power from Dominican President Juan Isidro Jimenes Pereyra, to leave Santo Domingo by threatening the city with naval bombardment.

The US Marines landed two days later and established effective control of the country within two months. Three major roads were built, largely for military purposes, connecting for the first time the capital with Santiago in the north, Azua in the west, and San Pedro de Macorís in the east; the system of forced labor used by the Americans in Haiti was absent in the Dominican Republic.

== Invasion ==
In early May 1916, a conflict erupted in Santo Domingo between 800 supporters of President Juan Isidro Jimenes and 500 followers of Desiderio Arias, the Minister of War and a caudillo. On May 5, "two companies of marines landed from the USS Prairie at Santo Domingo." Their goal was to offer protection to the American legation and the American consulate and to occupy Fort San Geronimo. Within hours, these companies were reinforced with "seven additional companies." On May 6, American forces from the USS Castine landed to offer protection to the Haitian Legation, a country under a similar military occupation by the United States. Two days after the first landing, constitutional President Jimenes resigned rather than accede to U.S. demands for greater political and economic control. On May 13, Rear Adm. William B. Caperton issued a demand for Arias, who was holed up in Fort Ozama, to disband his army and surrender his weapons. However, Arias and his supporters left the city instead of complying.

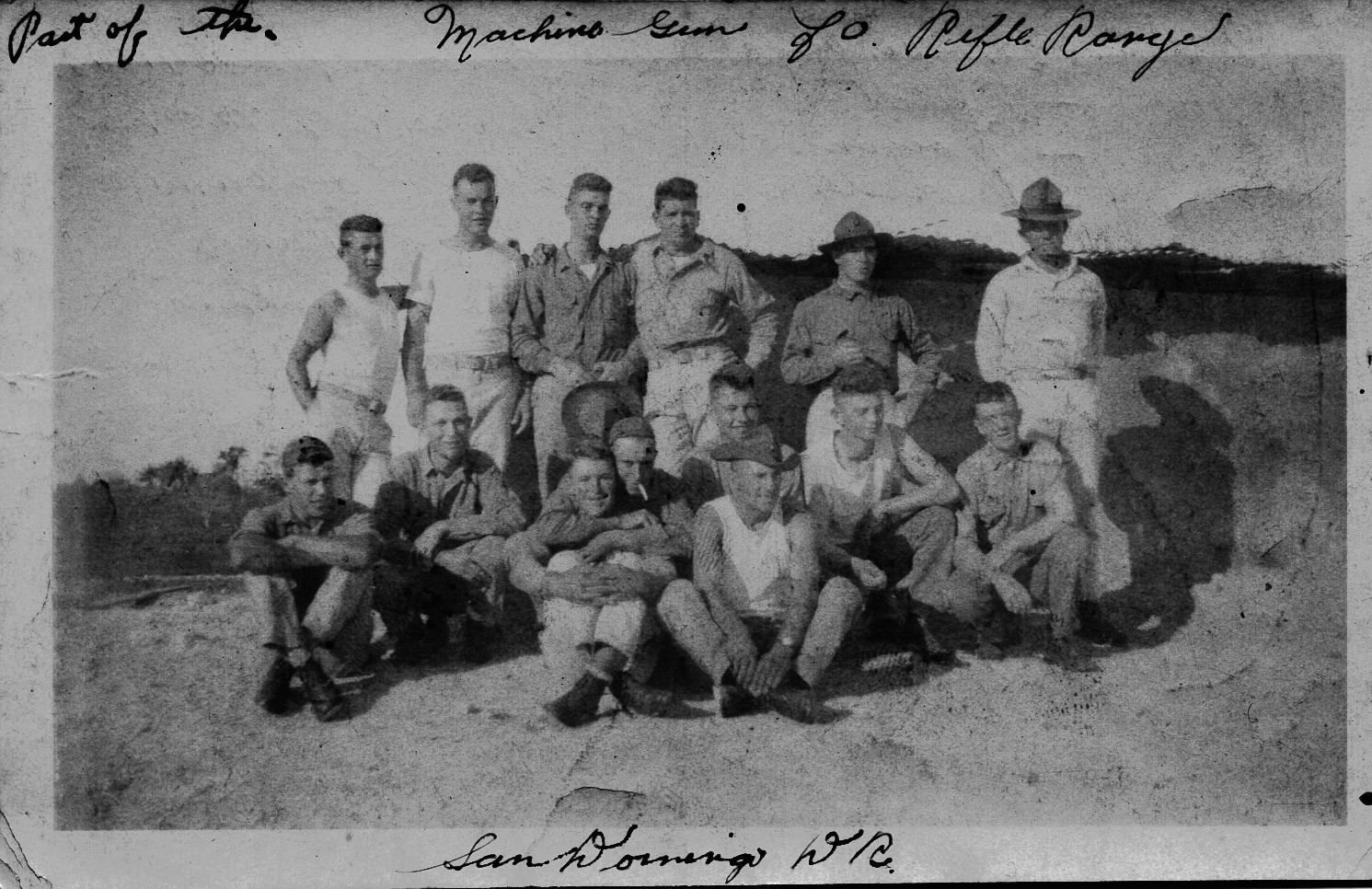
Marine machine gun unit in the Dominican Republic

Admiral Caperton's forces occupied Santo Domingo on May 15, 1916. Colonel Joseph H. Pendleton's Marine units took the key port cities of Puerto Plata and Monte Cristi on June 1 and enforced a blockade. The marines were able to occupy Monte Cristi without meeting any resistance. However, when the marines attacked Puerto Plata, they were met with resistance from about 500 pro-Arias Dominicans. Though they were under heavy fire, the marines persisted in attempting to enter the city, and sustained several casualties such as the death of Captain Herbert J. Hirschinger, who was the first marine killed in combat in the campaign.

The Dominicans destroyed bridges and sabotaged railroad tracks on their retreat to impede the Americans' advance toward Santiago. At one ravine, the Dominicans had destroyed a bridge spanning 91 meters. This led the Marines to employ an improvised trestle for crossing the ravine. Despite being constructed in just three hours, the makeshift bridge facilitated the transportation of heavy guns and trucks across the ravine. The first major engagement occurred on June 27, at Las Trencheras, two ridges, which had been fortified by the Dominicans and long thought to be invulnerable, since a Spanish army had been defeated there in 1864. There the Dominican troops had dug trenches on two hills, one behind the other, blocking the road to Santiago.

The field guns of Captain Chandler Campbell's 13th Company, along with a machine gun platoon, took position on a hill overlooking the enemy trenches and opened fire. Under the cover of this fire, the Marines launched a bayonet charge on the defenders' first line of defense, covered until the last possible moment by the artillery barrage. The Marines came under heavy but inaccurate rifle fire, which caused some casualties. The Dominican soldiers were forced to retreat to their trenches on the second hill. They rallied there briefly, then broke and had to retreat again as the American field guns resumed their shelling of the hill. Within 45 minutes from the opening artillery shots, the Marines had forced the Dominicans to fall back. During the battle, five Marines were killed and four were wounded, and five Dominicans were killed. This engagement set the pattern for most Marine contact with the Dominican forces. Marines overpowered Dominicans with modern artillery, Colt heavy machine guns, small-unit maneuver, and individual training and marksmanship. The Dominicans possessed mainly black-powder rifles, and more commonly, were armed only with pistols and shotguns.

The Marines, numbering 800, encountered an entrenched rebel force of 80 at Guayacanas. The Dominicans had dug defensive trenches and set up a roadblock with felled trees. Camouflaged by the removal of excavated earth, the enemy's position was so well concealed that the Marines had difficulty locating it. The Marines of the machine-gun platoon carried their Benét–Mercié light machine guns within a few hundred meters of the trenches and opened fire. The rebels maintained single-shot fire against the Marines' automatic weapons before the Marines drove them off, resulting in 27 Dominicans killed, while the Marine Corps only death was Corporal George Fravee; 10 marines were wounded.

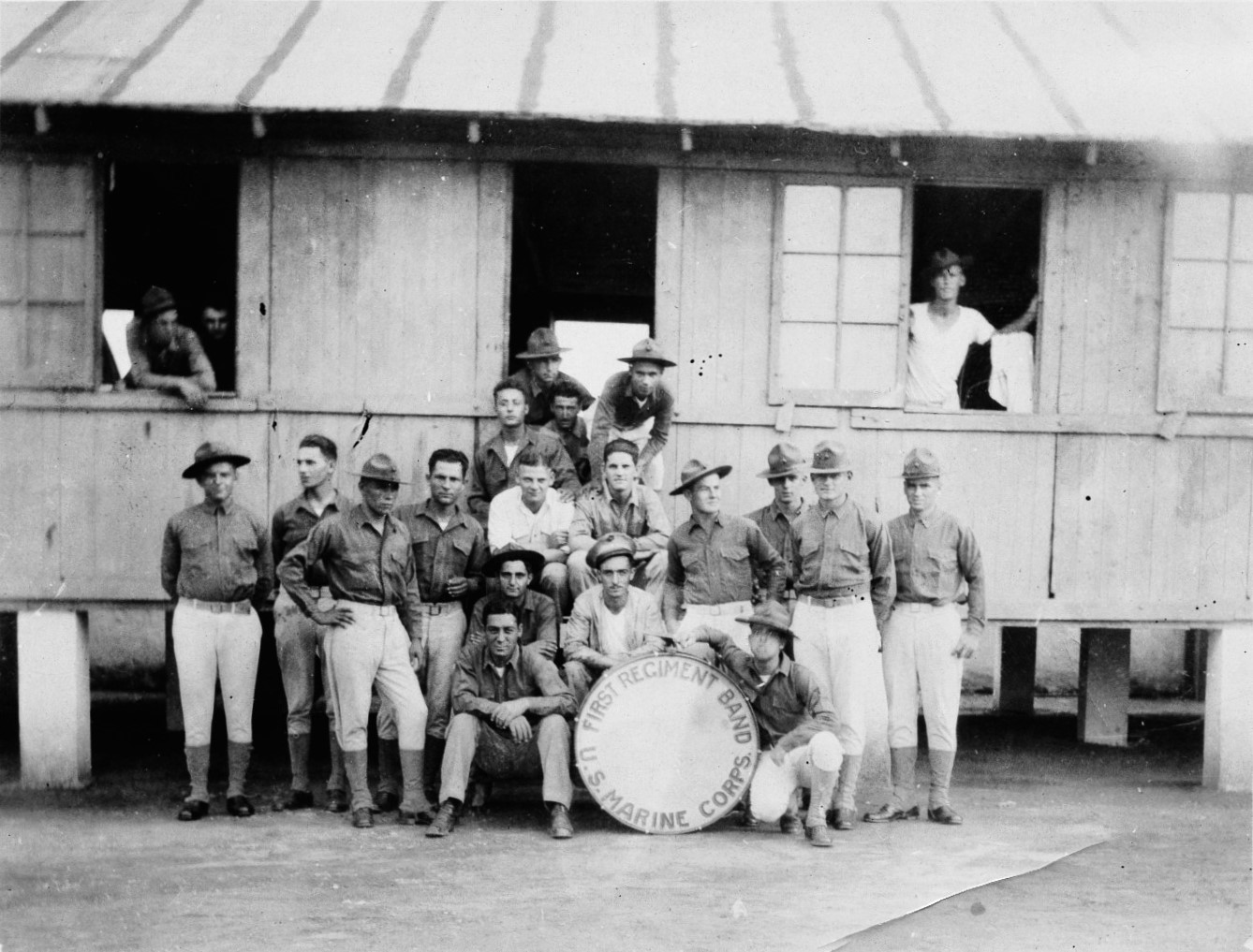
U.S. Marines in the Dominican Republic

Two days after the Battle of Guayacanas, on July 3 the Marines moved onto Arias' stronghold in Santiago de los Caballeros. However, "A military encounter was avoided when Arias arrived at an agreement with Capteron to cease resistance." Arias surrendered to the Dominican governor of the city of Santiago. Three days after Arias left the country, the rest of the occupation forces landed and took control of the country within two months, and on November 29, the United States imposed martial law and established a military government under Captain (later Rear Admiral) Harry Shepard Knapp, Commander of the Cruiser Force aboard his flagship, USS Olympia (which still exists today in Philadelphia, Pennsylvania, United States).

On the same day that the U.S. military government was declared, First Lieutenant Ernest C. Williams led an assault on the fort at San Francisco de Macorís, where Juan Perez, a local governor and supporter of Arias, along with his followers, stood their ground and refused to surrender their weapons. Williams, in his capacity as district commander, initially sent a message demanding the governor's retreat from the fort and the release of prisoners. However, the Dominican governor allegedly defiantly scrawled "Come and get me!" across the ultimatum in reply. During the early hours of the following evening, Williams led a detachment of 12 marines in a surprise attack on the fort and stormed the gate, resulting in a brief battle. Within minutes, the detachment of 13 marines, 8 of whom were wounded, successfully gained control of the fort and captured the 100 prisoners held within.

== Occupation ==
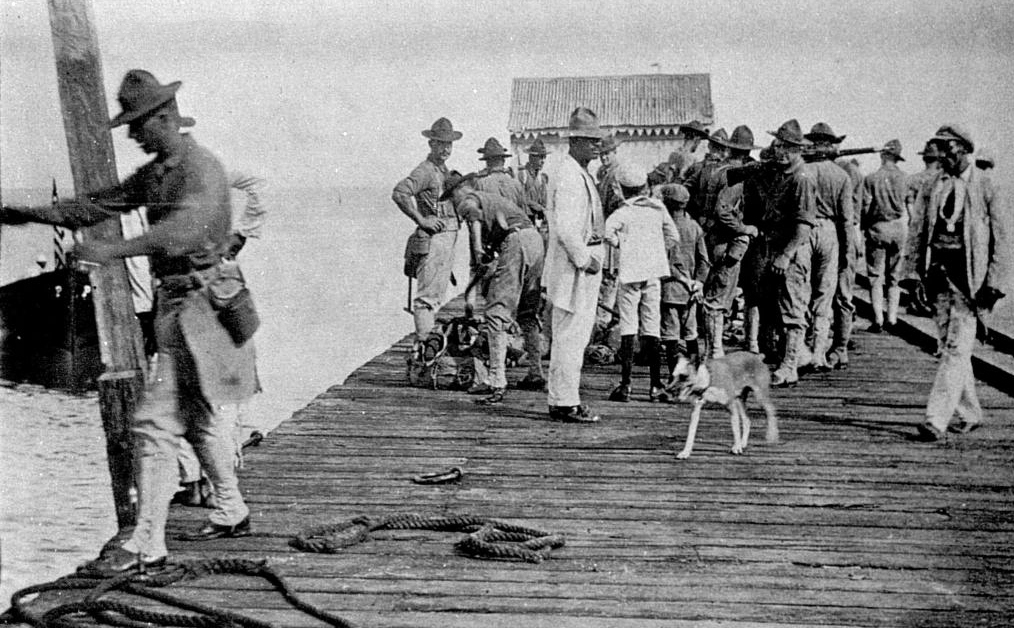
U.S. Marines during the occupation

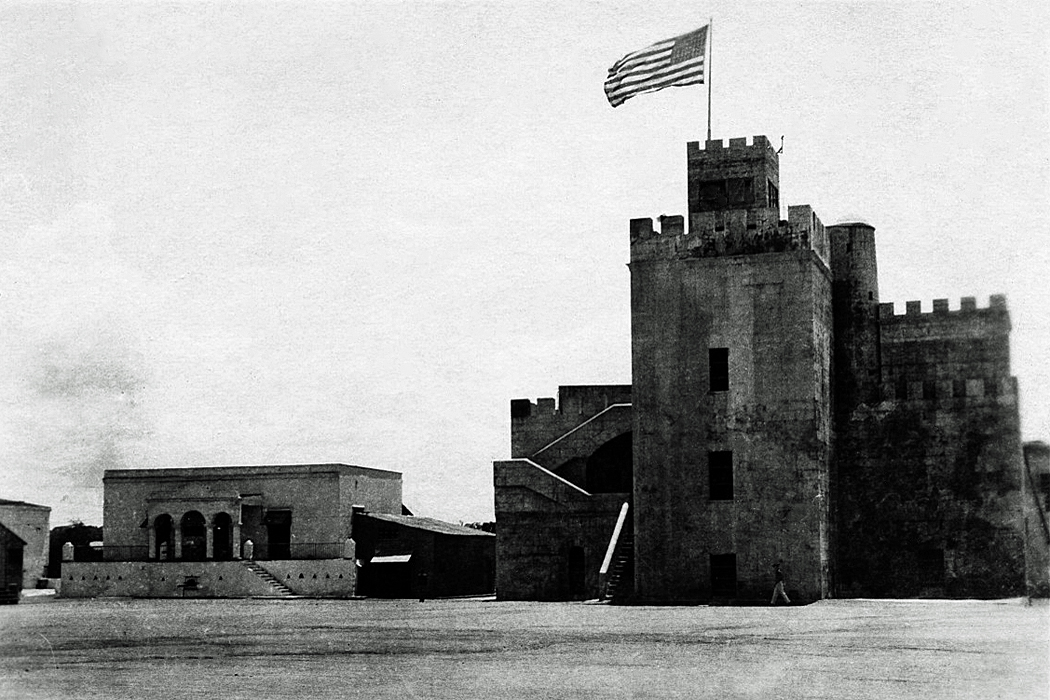
The Flag of the United States waving over Ozama Fortress, c. 1922

Marines claimed to have restored order throughout most of the republic, with the exception of the eastern region, but resistance to the occupation from Dominicans continued widespread in both, direct and indirect forms in every place. The U.S. occupation administration, however, measured its success through these standards: the country's budget was balanced, its debt was diminished, economic growth directed now toward the U.S.; infrastructure projects produced new roads that allowed the movement of military personnel across all the country's regions for the first time in history; a professional military organization that took away the power from local elites and made soldiers more loyal to the national government, the Dominican Constabulary Guard, replaced the former partisan forces responsible for the civil war with groups under the control of U.S. Marines. The Constabulary Guard, later known as the National Guard, would persecute and torture those who opposed the occupation.

With the United States occupation of Haiti to the west of the Dominican Republic, the United States Marines controlled all of Hispaniola "through censorship, intimidation, fear, and military force", according to Lorgia García Peña, a contemporary American academic. Like Haiti, the finances of the Dominican Republic were controlled by National City Bank of New York, subsequently allowing American businesses to acquire Dominican properties to cultivate sugar. American corporations would then force Haitians to migrate to the Dominican Republic and work on sugar plantations in poor conditions. American culture also influenced Dominicans, with cockfighting being replaced with baseball as the "national pastime". In addition, some Afro-religious groups being banned by occupying forces resulted in a stigma being placed against practicing communities that has continued into the 21st century. Marines also spread white supremacist ideology throughout the nation based on Jim Crow laws existing in the United States.

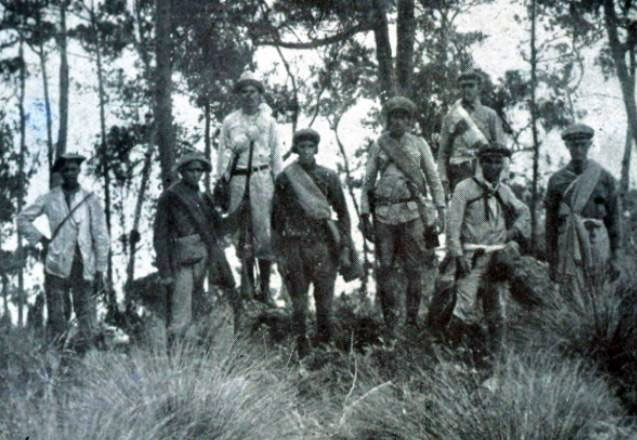
A group of peasant guerillas, known as gavilleros, who fought against the U.S. Marine occupation of the Dominican Republic

Most Dominicans greatly resented the loss of their sovereignty to foreigners, few of whom spoke Spanish or displayed much real concern for the welfare of the republic. A guerrilla movement, known as the gavilleros, with leaders such as General Ramón Natera, enjoyed considerable support from the population in the eastern provinces of El Seibo and San Pedro de Macorís. Having knowledge of the local terrain, they fought from 1917 to 1922 against the United States occupation. Imprisoned guerillas were mistreated by U.S. forces according to Congressional investigations. By 1919, the Marines were employing De Havilland DH-4B aircraft equipped with Lewis .30-caliber machine guns mounted on scarf mounts for their counter-insurgency operations. The fighting in the countryside ended in a stalemate, and the guerrillas agreed to a conditional surrender. The number of U.S. Marines stationed in the Dominican Republic never exceeded 3,000. However, they could quickly receive reinforcements from Port-au-Prince, Haiti, or Guantanamo, Cuba. During the occupation, the Marines suffered 144 killed in action, and the native constabularies incurred 74 casualties, while the Dominican insurgents sustained 950 killed or wounded.

Among protestors to the occupation was the Junta Patriótica de Damas, (Patriotic League of Ladies) a group of feminist writers, led by Floripez Mieses, Abigail Mejía, Luisa Ozema Pellerano, and Ercilia Pepín, created on March 15, 1920. Rosa Smester Marrero was a Santiago-born educator typical of feminist resistance to the occupation, publishing articles in literary magazines. Smester refused to speak English as a form of civil resistance, claiming that if she spoke that language, the Americans would also have occupied her mind.

== Withdrawal ==
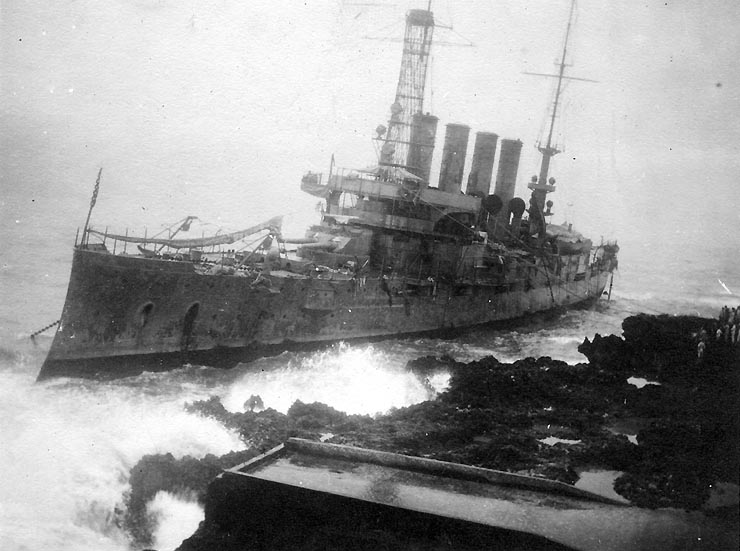
USS Memphis wrecked at Santo Domingo, Dominican Republic, where it was thrown ashore by rogue waves on the afternoon of August 29, 1916

Dominican migrants in Cuba began a successful campaign to denounce the U.S. occupation while Latin American governments also protested. According to the United States Department of State, U.S. Senate investigations "proved embarrassing" to the Wilson administration after Dominican witnesses argued that the government's actions violated international law, were against Wilson's Fourteen Points, and that occupying forces abused captives.

After World War I, public opinion in the United States began to run against the occupation. Warren G. Harding, who succeeded Wilson in March 1921, had campaigned against the occupations of both Haiti and the Dominican Republic. In June 1921, United States representatives presented a withdrawal proposal, known as the Harding Plan, which called for Dominican ratification of all acts of the military government, approval of a loan of US$2.5 million for public works and other expenses, the acceptance of United States officers for the constabulary, or National Guard, and the holding of elections under United States supervision. Popular reaction to the plan was overwhelmingly negative. Moderate Dominican leaders, however, used the plan as the basis for further negotiations that resulted in an agreement between U.S. Secretary of State Charles Evans Hughes and Dominican Ambassador to the United States Francisco J. Peynado on June 30, 1922, allowing for the selection of a provisional president to rule until elections could be organized.

Under the supervision of High Commissioner Sumner Welles, Juan Bautista Vicini Burgos assumed the provisional presidency on October 21, 1922. In the presidential election of March 15, 1924, Horacio Vásquez Lajara, an American ally who cooperated with the United States government, handily defeated Peynado. Vásquez's Alliance Party (Partido Alianza) also won a comfortable majority in both houses of Congress. With his inauguration on July 12, control of the republic returned to Dominican hands. U.S. forces withdrew on September 18, 1924, and handed policing authority to the Dominican National Guard.

== Aftermath ==
Despite the withdrawal, there were still concerns regarding the collection and application of the country's customs revenues. To address this problem, representatives of the United States and the Dominican Republic governments met at a convention and signed a treaty, on December 27, 1924, which gave the United States control over the country's customs revenues. In 1941, the treaty was officially repealed and control over the country's customs revenues was again returned to the government of the Dominican Republic. However this treaty created lasting resentment of the United States among the people of the Dominican Republic.

According to Lorgia García Peña, the occupation resulted in increased inequality in the Dominican Republic and contributed to the establishment of an economic and political system that benefits rich companies, while subjecting most Dominicans to poverty. American support for future dictator Rafael Trujillo, who rose through the ranks of the National Guard with the help of the U.S. Marines, was instrumental for establishing his base of support within the Dominican armed forces.

The Dominican Campaign Medal was an authorized U.S. service medal for those military members who had participated in the conflict.

== See also ==
- United States occupation of the Dominican Republic (1965–66)
- United States occupation of Nicaragua
- Mexican Border War (1910–1919)
- Latin America–United States relations
- Foreign interventions by the United States
- United States involvement in regime change
- List of United States invasions of Latin American countries
