= Harry Shepard Knapp =

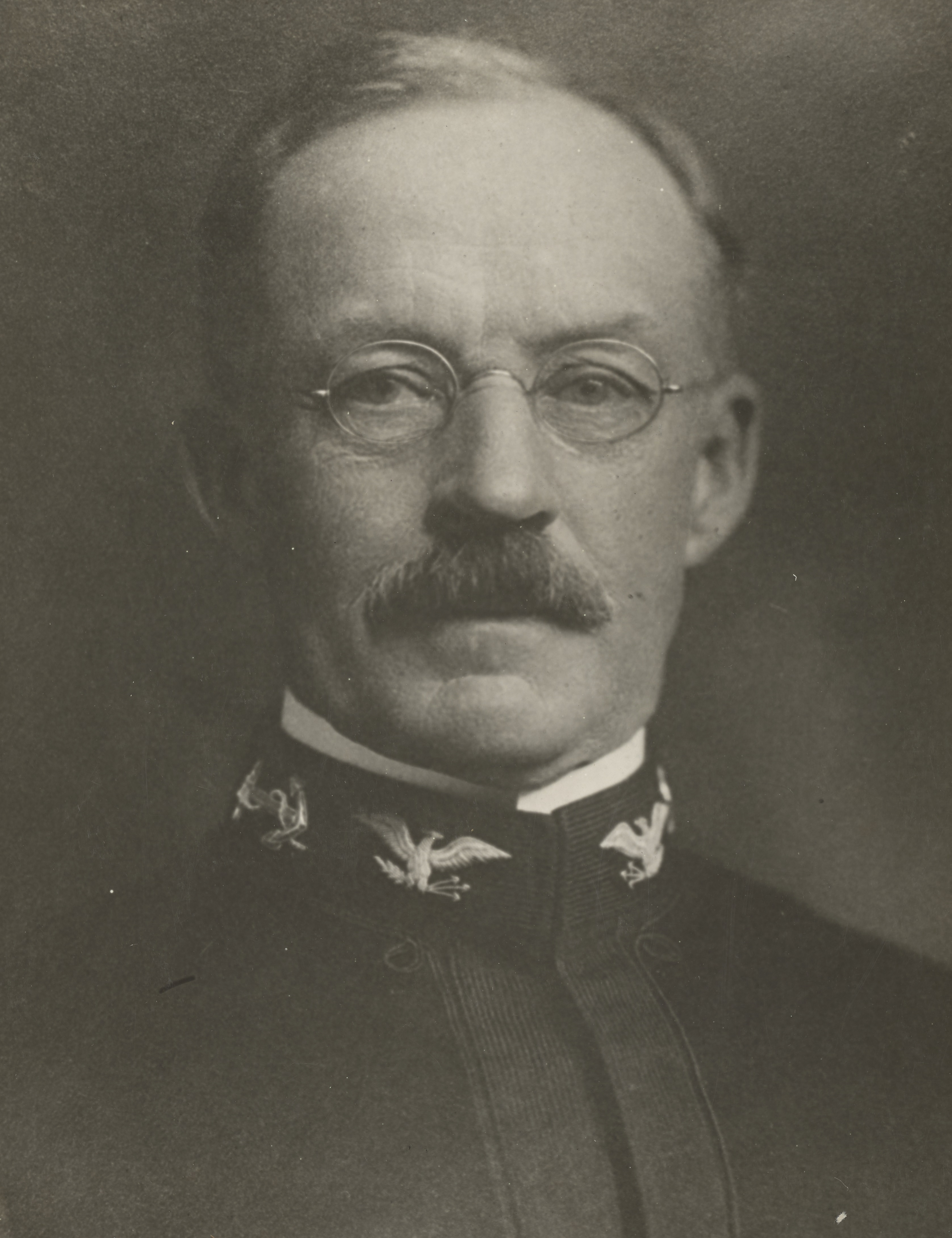
- Born: June 27, 1856; New Britain, Connecticut
- Died: April 6, 1923 (aged 66); Hartford, Connecticut
- Military career
- Allegiance: United States of America
- Branch: United States Navy
- Service years: 1878–1920
- Rank: Vice Admiral
- Commands: USS Charleston; USS Tennessee; USS Florida; Cruiser Force, Atlantic Fleet; U.S. Naval Forces Operating in European Waters (post-WWI)
- Conflicts: Spanish–American War; World War I
- Awards: Navy Cross

Harry Shepard Knapp (June 27, 1856 – April 6, 1923) was a Vice Admiral of the United States Navy, Military Governor of Santo Domingo, and Military Representative of the United States in Haiti.

== Biography ==
Born in New Britain, Connecticut, Knapp graduated from the United States Naval Academy on 20 June 1878. After serving in screw steamer Pensacola, as cadet midshipman, and in the steam frigate Minnesota and the sloop Jamestown as a midshipman, he was commissioned as ensign on 8 July 1882. Following assignments to a number of ships and stations ashore, Knapp was an executive officer on a gunboat at the outbreak of the Spanish–American War. Having attended the Naval War College in 1897, he returned there as a faculty member after the war. From 1906 to 1907, he attended the Army War College. Outstanding service in a variety of important billets afloat and ashore was rewarded on 3 August 1908 when Knapp assumed command of the protected cruiser Charleston (C-22).

Promoted to captain in 1909, Knapp was assigned to the General Board on 8 January 1910. At about this time he served intermittently on the Joint Army and Navy Board for Defense of the Panama Canal. From 1910 to 1911, Knapp was commanding officer of the armored cruiser Tennessee (ACR-10). He was in charge of Florida (BB-30) while she was fitted out and commanded the battleship when she first commissioned on 15 September 1911. He took command of Cruiser Force, Atlantic Fleet on 8 November 1915. He succeeded Francisco Henríquez y Carvajal as ruler of Santo Domingo in 1916.

Knapp was promoted to rear admiral on 17 March 1917 and a week before the United States entered World War I was appointed Military Governor of Santo Domingo (now the Dominican Republic) and Military Representative of the United States in Haiti.

"Meritorious service" in this post, laboring to protect Allied shipping from German U-boats and to make the Caribbean Sea secure from enemy aggression, earned Rear Admiral Knapp the Navy Cross. Soon after the armistice, he was Naval Attaché in London with staff duties and on 4 February 1920 assumed command of U.S. Naval Forces operating in European waters with rank of vice admiral, succeeding Vice Admiral W. S. Sims. Even after Vice Admiral Knapp was placed on the retired list effective 27 June 1920, the Navy utilized his singular abilities. This won him temporary active duty as a consultant and as quasi-diplomat. He died from heart disease at the Hartford Hospital in Hartford, Connecticut on 6 April 1923. His remains were cremated and the ashes were scattered at sea after a funeral service at his home in Hartford attended by his Naval Academy classmate Rear Admiral W. L. Rodgers.

== Namesake ==
The Fletcher-class destroyer USS Knapp (DD-653) was named in his honor.
