= Faustino de Soto =

Dominican politician (1805–1883)

Faustino de Soto (Azua, 1805–Higüey, 1883) was a 19th-century hacendado and politician from the Dominican Republic.

Faustino de Soto was born in 1805 in Azua to Diego de Soto (1783–1870), a hacendado of Spanish descent native to Hincha, and his third wife María Josefa de los Remedios Noboa (1788–1820), who was native to Azua. Soto had 2 full siblings and 9 half-siblings.

In 1836 Soto moved with his father Diego to Higüey. There, his uncle Father Antonio de Soto was the presbyter of the ancient sanctuary of Our Lady of Altagracia.

Soto signed a manifesto for a constitutional restoration in 1854. He became Senator of the Dominican Republic in 1856. In 1857 he was arrested for months by caudillo Pedro Santana for opposing his government.

Soto became a member of the provisional government junta in 1865. In 1867 he became congressman to the then-unicameral Congress of the Dominican Republic, representing El Seibo Province and serving with Deogracia Linares Burgos and José María Morales. Soto was exiled to Venezuela in 1869 for opposing Buenaventura Báez.

He died on 1 January 1883 in Higüey.

Soto fathered 19 children with 4 different women. With Vicenta Cedeño Noble he had 7 children. With Altagracia Minaya he had one daughter. He had a simultaneous relation with two women who were sisters: Simona Durán Santana and Candelaria Durán Santana, they were both granddaughters of hacendados Ramón Santana and Froilana Febles.

Among his descendants are: renowned teacher Mercedes Mon de Soto, actress Nuryn Sanlley, actress Ivonne Beras-Goico Guerrero, diplomat Patricia Villegas, congressman Orlando Jorge Villegas, and lawyer Conrad Pittaluga Vicioso.
