= Asela Mera de Jorge =

Dominican politician and women's rights activist

51st First Lady of the Dominican Republic
- In role August 16, 1982 – August 16, 1986
- President: Salvador Jorge Blanco
- Preceded by: Ana Elisa Villanueva
- Succeeded by: Rosa Gómez de Mejía (2000)

Personal details
- Born: Asela Altagracia Mera Checo; December 28, 1933 Villa González, Santiago Province, Dominican Republic
- Died: June 14, 2007 (aged 73) Santo Domingo, Dominican Republic
- Party: Dominican Revolutionary Party
- Spouse: Salvador Jorge Blanco (m. 1957)
- Children: Orlando Jorge Mera; Dilia Leticia Jorge Mera
- Relatives: Patricia Villegas (daughter-in-law); Orlando Jorge Villegas (grandson); Margarita Luna de Espaillat (cousin-in-law)

Asela Altagracia Mera Checo de Jorge (December 28, 1933 – June 14, 2007) was a Dominican politician, women's rights activist, and member of the Dominican Revolutionary Party (PRD). She served as the First Lady of the Dominican Republic from 1982 to 1986 during the presidency of her husband, Salvador Jorge Blanco. Asela Mera was known for her focus on social issues, women's rights, and prison reform during her tenure as first lady.

== Biography ==
=== Early and personal life ===
Mera was born on December 28, 1933, in Villa González, Santiago Province, just outside of the city of Santiago de los Caballeros. Her parents, Sebastián Alfonso Mera Ureña and Leticia Checo Checo, were businesspeople and members of a well-known family based in Santiago. Her siblings were Elida, Alina, Jose Rafael, and Frank Mera. Mera received degrees in accounting and administrative work from Colegio Sagrado Corazón de Jesús in Santiago de los Cabelleros.

Asela Mera married Salvador Jorge Blanco, a lawyer, on December 27, 1957. The couple had two children - Orlando Jorge Mera and Dilia Leticia Jorge Mera. Dilia Leticia Jorge Mera became a lawyer, while Orlando Jorge Mera became the secretary general of the Dominican Revolutionary Party (PRD) by 2007.

In addition to her role as Jorge Blanco's wife, she worked as his private secretary in his law practice for many years. Through her work, Mera became involved in politics and pro-democracy civil society movement in her own right.

=== First Lady ===
Mera de Jorge assumed the role of First Lady of the Dominican Republic from 1982 to 1986. In a 2006 interview, she admitted that, earlier in life, she hadn't had much of an idea of the duties of a first lady until Carmen Quidiello (wife of Juan Bosch) assumed the office in 1963. She admired Quidiello and how she expanded the role of Dominican first ladies during her brief tenure, which was cut short by a 1963 military coup that overthrew President Bosch. Mera recalled, "Because before [Quidiello], they were figures very much in the shadow of the President, but from then on the work of the first ladies is paramount for every government, not only here but throughout the world."

Salvador Jorge Blanco was elected president and the couple moved to the National Palace when he took office in August 1982. Mera and Jorge jointly decided not to use the existing presidential office on the palace's second floor, which had been previously occupied by Rafael Trujillo during his dictatorship and former President Joaquín Balaguer. Instead, Mera de Jorge suggested and established a new presidential office on the palace's third floor. Her office was also located on the third floor, next to her husband.

During her tenure, First Lady Mera de Jorge advocated for reforms to the Dominican Republic's prison system. In addition, she created and chaired the Commission for the Welfare of Mothers and Children (la Comisión para el Bienestar de la Madre y el Niño). Mera also lobbied for the creation of the national Directorate for the Advancement of Women. In 1983, the United Nations International Research and Training Institute for the Advancement of Women (INSTRAW) moved its headquarters to Santo Domingo with Mera's support.

Notably, Mera chose not to serve as head of the National Council for Children (Conani), which had been established by her predecessor, Renée Klang de Guzmán, explaining that a first lady needed to focus on more than just one job or position.

President Salvador Jorge Blanco declined to seek re-election in the 1986 general election. That same year, First Lady Asela Mera de Jorge was selected as the Dominican Revolutionary Party candidate for Senate from the Distrito Nacional when the previous PRD nominee, Santo Domingo Mayor José Francisco Peña Gómez, dropped out of the race at the last minute. It was a short election campaign, lasting less than sixty days. However, she was defeated in the May 1986 election by Jacinto Peynado Garrigosa.

=== Later life ===
The new government of President Joaquín Balaguer accused former President Jorge of corruption, which Jorge denied and denounced as politically motivated. Jorge was arrested and held in pre-trial detention at La Fe Prison beginning on May 13, 1987. Asela Mera de Jorge became one of her husband's most vocal defenders. She visited him frequently during his imprisonment. On July 2, 1989, Mera fell down the second floor prison stairs while delivering breakfast to her husband. The fall resulted in fractures to her left ankle and right wrist, which required hospitalization. Her injuries were further complicated by her pre-existing diabetes and she was flown to the United States for medical treatment. In 2001, The Supreme Court of the Dominican Republic overturned Jorge's conviction, citing ill treatment by the Balaguer government. Mera de Jorge said she forgave Balaguer for his role in her husband's prosecution and imprisonment.

Asela Mera de Jorge died on June 14, 2007, from a diabetic coma at her home in the Naco neighborhood of Santo Domingo at the age of 73. She was survived by her husband, former President Salvador Jorge Blanco; their two children, Orlando Jorge Mera and Lidia Leticia Jorge Mera; as well as her four grandchildren, Isabel Cristina Mesa Jorge, Elia Leticia Mesa Jorge, Orlando Salvador Jorge Villegas, and Patricia Victoria Jorge Villegas. Her wake was held at the Blandino funeral home on Abraham Lincoln Avenue in Santo Domingo. Dignitaries in attendance at her funeral included then-President Leonel Fernández and then-First Lady Margarita Cedeño de Fernández, Vice President Rafael Alburquerque, and former President Hipólito Mejía.

Mera was buried in the Christ the Redeemer Catholic Cemetery (el cementerio Cristo Redentor) on June 15, 2007.
