= Antonio Abad Alfau =

3rd Vice President of the Dominican Republic (1856–1856)

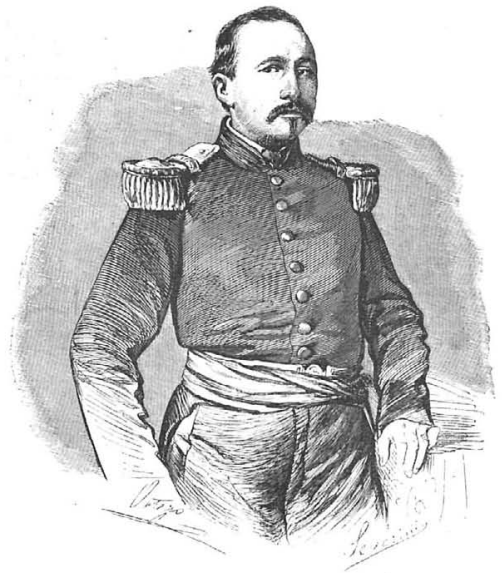
- 1862 portrait of General Antonio Abad Alfau

3rd Vice President of the Dominican Republic
- In office 1856–1856
- President: Manuel de Regla Mota
- Preceded by: Manuel de Regla Mota
- Succeeded by: Buenaventura Báez

Personal details
- Born: 1817 Santo Domingo, Captaincy General of Santo Domingo
- Died: January 14, 1871 (aged 53–54) Seville, Spain
- Relations: Felipe Benicio Alfau (brother)
- Occupation: Politician and military commander

Military service
- Allegiance: Dominican Republic; Spain
- Branch/service: Dominican Army; Spanish Army
- Years of service: 1844–1871
- Rank: General
- Battles/wars: Dominican War of Independence; Dominican Restoration War

Antonio Abad Alfau (1817 – January 14, 1871) was a Dominican military officer and conservative politician who served as a trusted collaborator of Presidents Pedro Santana and Buenaventura Báez. He stood out in the struggle for Dominican independence, and later as a servant of the Spanish regime in Santo Domingo in the 1860s.

== Biography ==
He was born in Santo Domingo in 1817 to María del Carmen Bustamante López (1798–1835), a Dominican woman, and Julián Alfau Páez (1786–1852), a Venezuelan immigrant. He had one brother, Felipe Benicio Alfau, with whom he maintained a close relationship.

During the Dominican War of Independence, he was one of the soldiers who took part in the most notable actions in the Battle of Las Carreras.

In 1852, he was commissioned by President Buenaventura Báez to travel to Haiti to negotiate with Haitian Emperor Faustin I for the recognition of the Dominican Republic.

In 1856, he resigned as Vice President of the Republic after clashing with President Manuel de Regla Mota, whose initiatives were influenced by the Spanish Consul Antonio María Segovia.

Abad Alfau was also commissioned in 1857 by President Báez to exchange paper money for the people of Cibao for gold ounces. This decision greatly displeased the Cibao region and was one of the causes of the overthrow of the Head of State.

In 1859, in his capacity as Vice President of the Republic, President Pedro Santana appointed him to the Executive Branch.

In 1861, he supported the annexation of the Republic to Spain. In recognition of his services to the Annexation Government, he received the sash of Field Marshal and the Grand Cross of the Royal Order of Isabella the Catholic.

During the Dominican Restoration War, which began on August 16, 1863, Antonio Abad Alfau stood by the Spanish forces.

On January 15, 1871, former Field Marshal Antonio Abad Alfau died at the age of 54 in Seville, Spain.

== See also ==
- Pedro Santana
- Felipe Benicio Alfau
- Dominican Restoration War
