= Ana Elisa Villanueva =

First Lady of the Dominican Republic

50th First Lady of the Dominican Republic
- In role July 4, 1982 – August 16, 1982
- President: Jacobo Majluta
- Preceded by: Renée Klang de Guzmán
- Succeeded by: Asela Mera de Jorge

Second Lady of the Dominican Republic
- In office August 16, 1978 – July 4, 1982

Personal details
- Born: Ana Elisa Villanueva Callot; July 28, 1930 Puerto Plata, Dominican Republic
- Died: April 5, 1998 (aged 67) Santo Domingo, Dominican Republic
- Party: Dominican Revolutionary Party; Independent Revolutionary Party
- Spouse: Jacobo Majluta (m. 1962; died 1996)
- Relations: Dulce María Loynaz (second cousin-twice removed); Hipólito Mejía (third cousin); Rosa Gómez de Mejía (third cousin); Carolina Mejía (double third cousin-once removed); Juan Garrigó Mejía (triple third cousin-twice removed)
- Children: Consuelo Elena

Ana Elisa Aurora Villanueva Callot (July 28, 1930 – April 5, 1998) was a Dominican politician and children's advocate. She served as First Lady of the Dominican Republic from July 4, 1982, to August 16, 1982, during the brief 43-day presidency of her husband, Jacobo Majluta. Villanueva was also the vice president of the Independent Revolutionary Party (PRI).

== Biography ==
Villanueva was born on July 28, 1930, in Puerto Plata, Dominican Republic, to an elite family. Her parents were Fernando Villanueva Astol and Consuelo Callot Guridi. Through her mother, Villanueva was distantly related to Cuban poet Dulce María Loynaz. She was raised in Puerto Plata. Villanueva married Jacobo Majluta on April 17, 1962, in a Puerto Plata civil ceremony. The couple had one daughter.

Majluta and Villanueva were founding members of the Dominican Revolutionary Party (PRD), which was formed in the Dominican Republic in 1961 following the end of the Rafael Trujillo dictatorship. Ana Elisa Villanueva co-founded the PRD's women's wing and served on its board of directors.

Jacobo Majluta was elected vice president as the running mate of presidential candidate, Antonio Guzmán Fernández. Therefore, Villanueva became the country's second lady, or wife of the vice president. In 1979, thenone-First Lady Renée Klang de Guzmán created the National Council for Children (CONANI). As the wife of the vice president, Ana Elisa Villanueva became the vice president of CONANI until the end of the Guzmán administration in 1982.

President Antonio Guzmán Fernández committed suicide on July 4, 1982. As a result, Vice President Jacobo Majluta became acting president for the remaining 43 days of Guzmán term and Ana Elisa Villanueva served as first lady from July 4, 1982, to August 16, 1982. Majluta attempted to win the Dominican Revolutionary Party's (PRD) presidential nomination, but lost to Salvador Jorge Blanco, who succeeded him as president.

In 1986, Joaquín Balaguer was elected President of the Dominican Republic. Balaguer appointed Ana Elisa Villanueva as the president of the National Council for Children (CONANI). Villanueva served as head of CONANI until her death in April 1998.

In 1989, Jacobo Majluta founded the Independent Revolutionary Party (PRI) to advance his own political ambitions. Ana Elisa Villanueva became the vice president of the new political party.

Ana Elisa Villanueva died in Santo Domingo on April 5, 1998, at the age of 67. Majluta died from lung cancer in March 1996 in Tampa, Florida.
