= Antonio María Segovia =

Spanish diplomat and writer (1808–1874)

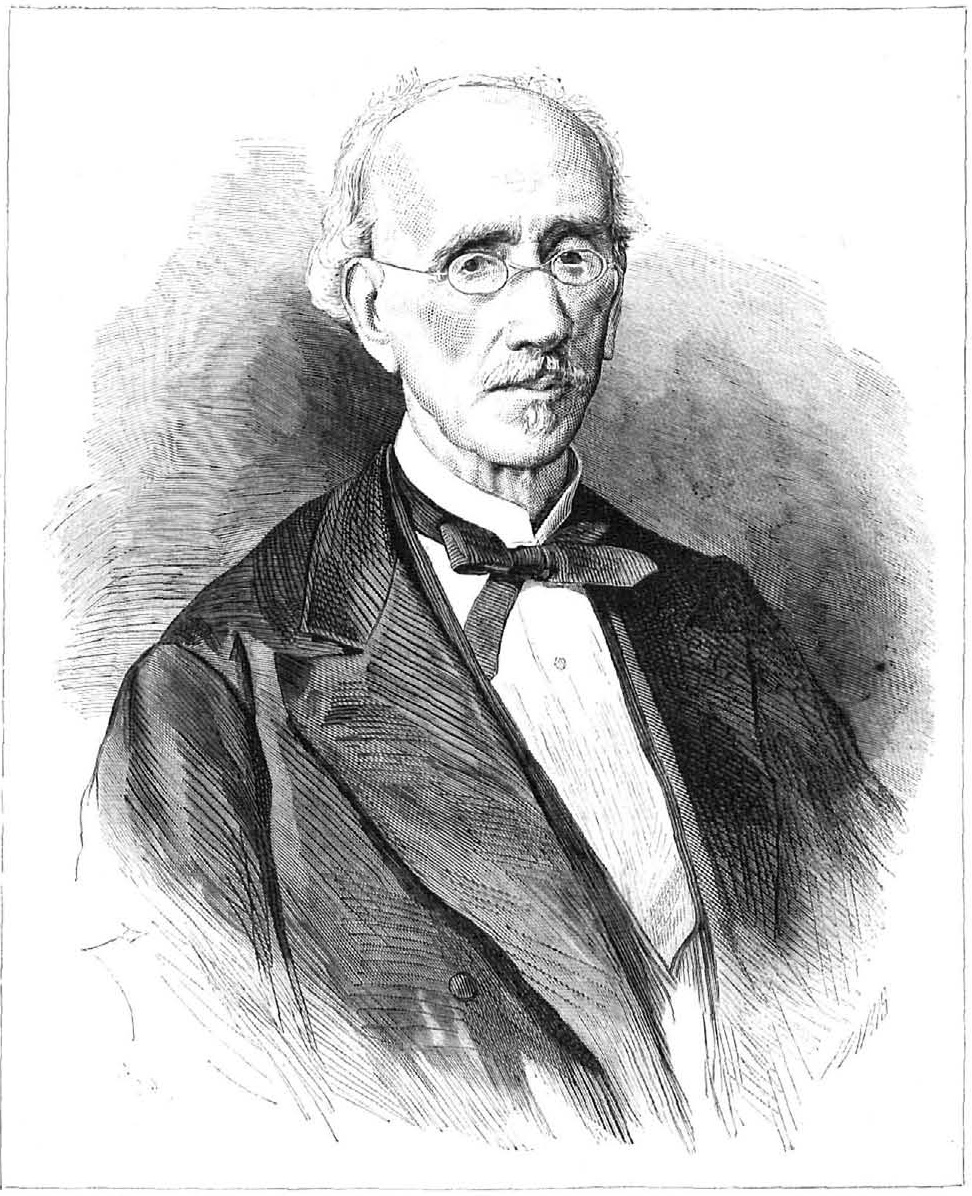
Illustration of Segovia c. 1874

Antonio María Segovia Izquierdo (June 29, 1808 – January 14, 1874) known by his journalistic pseudonyms El Estudiante and El Cócora, was a Spanish journalist, politician and writer. As the Spanish diplomat to the Dominican Republic, his activities intertwined with the competing nations of France, Great Britain, and the United States, all of which stoked interest in annexing the Caribbean nation, which during that time was in its own struggle for independence.

== Early life ==
He was born in Madrid, Spain on June 29, 1808.

== Career and research ==
After abandoning his military career, he devoted himself to journalism under the pseudonyms El Estudiante and El Cócora in a wide variety of publications. A friend and collaborator of the poet and journalist Santos López Pelegrín, better known as Abenámar, with whom he published Abenámar y El Estudiante, he was famous for his sarcasm and wit; he translated from French and wrote many plays (for example, El peluquero en el baile (1850), El aguador y el misántropo (1854), A un cobarde, otro mayor or the zarzuela Don Pacífico, or El dómine irresoluto, among many others and festive and satirical poems (Colección de poblaciones serias y festivos, en prosa y verso, entre los ediciones ediciones libres y unpublished del escritor known as "El Estudiante", Madrid: Repullés, 1839). He worked for La Abeja and the Semanario Pintoresco Español, co-directed El Progreso and was a bullfighting critic for El Correo Nacional; he enjoyed mockingly criticising the excesses of romanticism, but above all he was a caustic and aggressive political columnist, a role he played in El Mundo, other newspapers and especially in El Jorobado, in the latter mainly against Juan Álvarez Mendizábal. Finally, he founded his own newspaper, directed by himself, El Estudiante, in 1839, which did not last long: in 1840 he had to go into exile in Paris for political reasons.

He was a member of the Royal Academy of Fine Arts of San Fernando and since 1845, of the Royal Academy, where he succeeded Manuel Bretón de los Herreros as secretary in 1873 and for which post he carried out a series of scholarly studies, some of them of a Cervantine nature; noteworthy are Del drama lírico y de la lengua castellana como elemento musical.

=== Diplomatic activities ===
President Pedro Santana had negotiated a treaty of friendship, trade and navigation with the United States that provided for the transfer and leasing of the Samaná Bay and Peninsula to that country, which prompted protests from the consuls of Great Britain and France, as well as opposition from supporters of Buenaventura Báez, exiled in Curaçao.

The victories against the Haitian emperor Faustin Soulouque, who invaded the Dominican Republic in 1855 with the aim of reincorporating its territory into Haiti, further strengthened the power of Santana, who continued his negotiations with the United States. In the midst of the Dominican War of Independence, the new Spanish consul, Antonio María Segovia, arrived in Santo Domingo, whose main mission was to prevent the United States and Santana from reaching an agreement.

From the moment of his arrival, Segovia began to deploy all his efforts to achieve his purpose and soon acquired such prestige that Jonathan Elliot, the American commercial agent in Santo Domingo, unsuccessfully tried to counteract the Spanish efforts by inducing his Government to adopt a more aggressive policy in the Dominican Republic. Segovia had met Báez in Madrid during the period of the Spanish regime of the Dominican Republic, establishing a certain relationship with him, since when Queen Isabel II promulgated the decree of abandonment, he wrote his resignation from the rank of field marshal that had been granted to him.

The activity of the Spanish consul consisted of supporting all of Santana's enemies, for which he opened a registry book at the consulate headquarters so that Dominicans who wanted to acquire Spanish nationality could register in it, causing the Segovia Registration Scandal. This act constituted a clear violation of Article 7 of the treaty of recognition of the Republic signed with Spain in 1854. According to calculations by a certain Felix Montecattini, a hydraulic engineer and inspector general of mines, indicated in a long writing entitled Báez, King of the Dominicans dethroned forever, but which was in reality the work of Mr. Marle, a French teacher and soldier who had known Napoleon Bonaparte and settled in Santo Domingo, more than 10,000 Dominicans were enrolled, who were led to believe that if they did not place themselves under the protection of Spain they would be exterminated in the course of the revolutions to come.

Santana protested to the Spanish Government about Segovia's blatant interference in the internal affairs of the Dominican Republic through his representative in Madrid, but while he waited for a response the resistance against him grew stronger and, seeing himself abandoned even by many of his followers, he pretended to be ill and retired to his estate in El Seibo to prepare his resignation, but not before declaring a state of emergency and alerting the Armed Forces. After his resignation on May 26, 1856, he was replaced by the vice president, Manuel de Regla Mota, who had to dismiss the Dominican Army due to the country's serious economic situation.

With his power practically gone, Segovia moved to Saint Thomas, where Báez was, and offered to support him in returning to the Dominican Republic and installing him again in the presidency. Báez did not hesitate to accept and, once in Santo Domingo, Regla Mota agreed with him and Segovia to appoint him as vice president and then resign and allow him to accede to the Presidency, which happened on October 6, 1856. The newspaper El Eco del Pueblo, in its December 21 edition, reported that, after the decree appointing the cabinet was promulgated, the inhabitants of the city gave themselves over to extraordinary joy, heading to Báez's residence to congratulate him. He responded with a few words of thanks, and then the people marched to the house in Segovia to offer their congratulations to the Spanish queen on the occasion of her birthday, which was celebrated that day, and to express their gratitude for all she had done for the freedom of the Dominican people.In prose he wrote Manual del viajero español de Madrid a París y Londres (1851), in which he wrote:

"Our rudeness despises that refinement of domestic comfort that the English especially have carried to such a high degree and call comfort. Among us, it is considered excessive and ridiculous delicacy to wish that no air enters through the cracks of the doors; that the furniture is not dusty; that the chairs and sofas are for sitting and not as decoration of the room; that in all seasons the room is kept at a convenient temperature; that bedbugs do not flood our bed; that the cook is not singing seguidillas at the top of her voice, while the guest sleeps or works; that the servant does not come to serve dirty dressed, with a cigar in his mouth or stinking of sweat.

In 1858, Segovia was transferred to another destination because his activities had offended France and England.

== Death ==
In 1873, he published The Anonymous, the Anonymists and the Anonymities. He died a year later on January 14, 1874. He was 65 years old.

Initially buried in the San Martín cemetery, when it disappeared, his remains were transferred to the Almudena cemetery, where they currently rest.

== See also ==
- Segovia Registration Scandal
- Buenaventura Báez
- Pedro Santana
- Manuel de Regla Mota

== Sources ==
- Dir. Victor Garcia de la Concha, History of Spanish Literature. 19th Century (I). Coord. Guillermo Carnero. Madrid: Espasa-Calpe, 1996.
- Jesus Bregante, Espasa Dictionary of Spanish Literature . Madrid: Espasa-Calpe, 2003.
