= Renée Klang de Guzmán =

Dominican philanthropist and First Lady of the Dominican Republic

Renée Klang Avelino
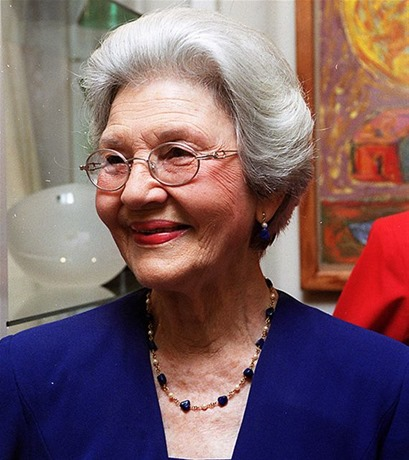

49th First Lady of the Dominican Republic
- In role 16 August 1978 – 4 July 1982
- President: Antonio Guzmán Fernández
- Preceded by: None (1966–1978)
- Succeeded by: Ana Elisa Villanueva

Director of the National Council for Childhood and Adolescence (CONANI)
- In office 1978–1982
- President: Antonio Guzmán Fernández
- Vice President: Jacobo Majluta Azar
- Preceded by: Office created

Personal details
- Born: 30 November 1916 La Guaira, Venezuela
- Died: 17 September 2014 (aged 97) Santiago, Dominican Republic
- Citizenship: (France) French (1916–1939) (Dominican Republic) Dominican (1939–2014)
- Party: Dominican Revolutionary Party
- Spouse: Antonio Guzmán
- Children: 2
- Parent(s): Charles Klang, Judith Avelino

Renée Klang Avelino (La Guaira, Venezuela, 30 November 1916 – Santiago de los Caballeros, Dominican Republic, 17 September 2014) was a Dominican philanthropist and First Lady of the Dominican Republic from 1978 to 1982. The wife and widow of the Dominican President Antonio Guzmán, she founded the National Council for Childhood (CONANI) and earned the mote of "the Eternal First Lady". After the presidency of her late husband, she was devoted to philanthropy and volunteerism in the city of Santiago de los Caballeros.

== Biography ==
Renée Klang was born in La Guaira, Venezuela, to Charles Klang, a French diplomat, and Judith Avelino, a Brazilian woman. When she was a teenager, her family settled in the Dominican Republic. She did her secondary studies on Santiago de los Caballeros and her university studies on Santo Domingo, where she graduated in Dentistry at the Autonomous University of Santo Domingo.

Amid her studies in Santo Domingo, she met Silvestre Antonio Guzmán. Klang married Guzmán on 28 October 1939 and dropped out of college. After the fall of the dictatorship of Trujillo, they devoted themselves to politics and joined the Juan Bosch's Dominican Revolutionary Party.

She bore two children, Iván (1944–1970) and Sonia (born 1946). The latter was minister of Industry and Commerce during Hipólito Mejía's presidency.

During the presidency of her husband, Klang shared with two popes: John Paul I and John Paul II. The former wrote about Klang in his diary and said that: "The wife of the president of the Dominican Republic is intelligent and vivacious. She is cultured and serious, she knows how to go to the root of problems without any boasting."

After her husband’s suicide, just days before the end of his constitutional term, she moved back to Santiago and dedicated to philanthropy.

== Death ==
She died in Santiago, aged 97, due to complications from a thrombosis in the right leg.
