= Salvador Jorge Blanco =

President of the Dominican Republic from 1982 to 1986

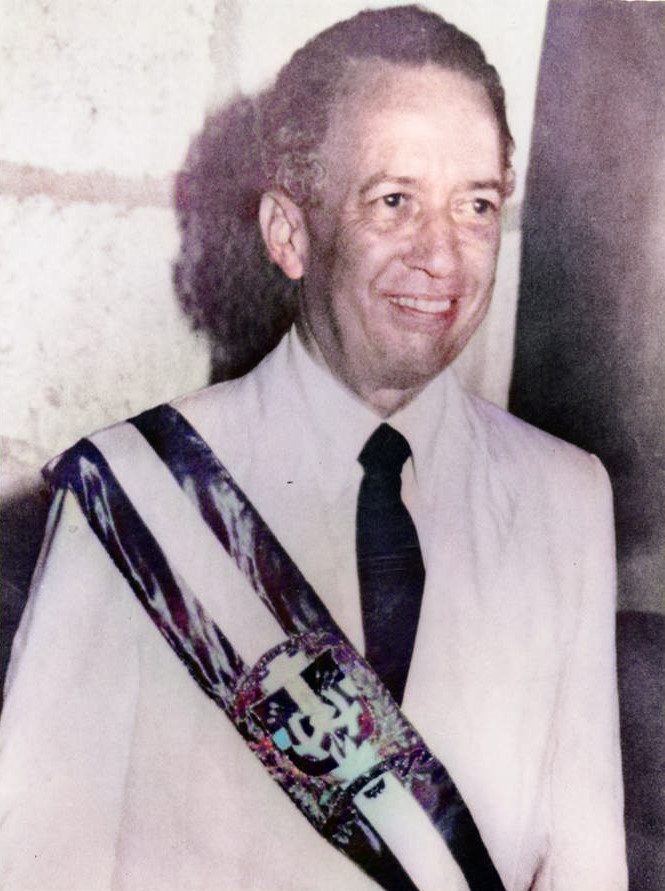
- Jorge Blanco in 1982

48th President of the Dominican Republic
- In office 16 August 1982 – 16 August 1986
- Vice President: Manuel Fernández Mármol (1982–1983); Vacant (1983–1986)
- Preceded by: Jacobo Majluta
- Succeeded by: Joaquín Balaguer

Personal details
- Born: 5 July 1926 Santiago de los Caballeros, Dominican Republic
- Died: 26 December 2010 (aged 84) Santo Domingo, Dominican Republic
- Party: PRD
- Spouse: Asela Mera de Jorge (m. 1957; died 2007)
- Relations: Patricia Villegas (daughter-in-law); Orlando Jorge Villegas (grandson); Sarah Jorge León (second cousin-once removed)
- Children: Orlando and Dilia Leticia
- Profession: Lawyer

José Salvador Omar Jorge Blanco (5 July 1926 – 26 December 2010) was a Dominican politician, lawyer and writer who served as the 48th president of the Dominican Republic from 1982 to 1986. He was a Senator running for the PRD party. He started his political career as a Committee Secretary for the Unión Cívica de Santiago in 1963 and joined the PRD in 1964.

== Early years and education ==
Jorge Blanco was born in Santiago on July 5, 1926, son of Dilia Limbert Blanco Polanco (Tamboril, 1900-Santiago, 1988) and Pedro María Jorge Arias (Licey, 1898-Santiago, 1982). He studied at primary school Ercilia Pepin, and superiors at the Ulises Francisco Espaillat high school. He graduated in Law from the Autonomous University of Santo Domingo. In 1951, he obtained a doctorate from the Complutense University of Madrid, with a postgraduate degree in the specialty of International Law. Jorge Blanco was a musician, standing out on instruments such as piano and cello.

Jorge married Asela Mera de Jorge on December 27, 1957. The couple had two children, Orlando Jorge Mera and Dilia Leticia Jorge Mera. Dilia Leticia Jorge Mera is a lawyer, while Orlando Jorge Mera became secretary general of the Dominican Revolutionary Party (PRD).

In 1961, he opened a law firm after the overthrow of the dictatorship of Rafael Trujillo, immediately began in political life as a member of the National Civic Union. In 1963, after the coup d'état to President Juan Bosch, he joined the civil movement that sought the return of Dominican constitutionality.

In 1964, he joined the Dominican Revolutionary Party, where he held various positions in the Political Commission and the National Executive Committee of the same.

== Presidency ==
Jorge Blanco succeeded fellow PRD member Antonio Guzman to the presidency in 1982 after winning the elections of that year using the slogan "The people are with the best, the people are with Salvador". Despite their political affiliations, Guzmán's term (before Majluta's) was characterized by a bitter feud with Jorge Blanco, who from the senate led the party in opposition to the administration. Unproven, but widely circulated rumors and conspiracy theories tied Guzmán's family advisers to corruption, especially following the president's alleged suicide in July 1982.

At the time of Jorge Blanco’s election, it was hoped that neopatrimonial patterns would experience a clearer and more dramatic break, given that Blanco was going to govern with a PRD majority in both houses (17 out of 27 in the senate and 62 of 120 in the chamber). However, two events highlight Jorge Blanco’s constraints and his limitations while in office. In April 1984, sharp price increases mandated as part of an economic stabilization program approved by the International Monetary Fund (IMF) led to massive riots and scores of deaths. This tarnished the administration's record in civil and human rights, one of the areas where the PRD had been able to project its sharpest differences with the former Balaguer administration. Then, in November 1985, a party primary that was intended to highlight the PRD's continued commitment to internal democratic procedures to select its presidential nominee ended inconclusively due to a shoot-out at the Concorde Hotel, where the ballots were being counted. Jorge Blanco governed the Dominican Republic during a period of dramatic economic difficulties imposed largely by the international system. In 1985, for the first time since the 1965 civil war, the country experienced negative growth rates. He adopted some neoliberal economic policies.

== Post-presidency and corruption charges ==
Salvador Jorge Blanco was, at the end of his mandate in 1986, considered by many to be one of the most promising political leaders in Dominican Republic. However, following a long interrogation session and an order for his arrest on corruption charges relating to the illegal commissions on the purchase of equipment for the armed forces, Jorge Blanco fled to the Venezuelan embassy on April 30, 1987, requesting political asylum. A heart spasm led to his internment in a Santo Domingo clinic, even as the Venezuelan government opted not to respond to his asylum request. Jorge Blanco was allowed to leave for the United States for medical treatment after acknowledging there was a warrant for his arrest. President Joaquín Balaguer, who succeeded him, tried Jorge for corruption in November 1988. Jorge was prosecuted (in absentia) by Marino Vinicio Castillo, and eventually sentenced to a multi-million fine and 23 years in jail after several months of a trial that was televised. In May 2001, the Supreme Court reviewed the case, it found the case was damaged by violations of President Jorge Blanco’s rights and the conviction was quashed. Jorge always denied the charges and claimed his nightmare was the result of political persecution by Joaquín Balaguer.

== Death ==
On November 25, 2010 the Ex-President was taken to the emergency room at the Center for Advanced Medicine Dr. Abel González, after falling from his bed and hitting his head causing a heavy internal hemorrhage. On the early morning of December 26, 2010 he died after being in a coma for 37 days.

== See also ==
- Politics of the Dominican Republic

== Notes ==
Political offices
| Preceded by Jacobo Majluta | President of the Dominican Republic; 16 August 1982 – 16 August 1986 | Succeeded by Joaquín Balaguer |
