= Marquess of Las Carreras =

Former Spanish marquisal title

Portrait of Pedro Santana

Marquess of Las Carreras was a hereditary marquisal title in the Spanish nobility. It was created in 1862 by Queen Isabella II to Lt. General Pedro Santana, landholder and the 1st President of the Dominican Republic, following his retirement as Governor-General of Santo Domingo in 1862. The title honoured Santana's victory over the Haitian forces, led by President Faustin Soulouque in the Battle of Las Carreras in 1849.

== Marquesses of Las Carreras (1862) ==
- Pedro Santana, 1st Marquess of Las Carreras (1801–1864)
