= Orlando Jorge Villegas =

Dominican Republic politician and journalist (born 1991)

The Most Illustrious (Spanish: Ilustrísimo Señor) Orlando Jorge Villegas

Member of the Chamber of Deputies of the Dominican Republic
- Incumbent
- Assumed office 16 August 2020

Personal details
- Born: 2 February 1991 (age 35) Santiago de los Caballeros, Dominican Republic
- Party: Modern Revolutionary Party
- Parents: Orlando Jorge Mera (father); Patricia Villegas (mother)
- Relatives: Salvador Jorge Blanco (grandfather); Asela Mera (grandmother); Faustino de Soto Noboa (great-great-grandfather); Pedro Santana (great-great-great-great-granduncle); Marcos Augusto Jorge Elías (second cousin-twice removed); Sarah Jorge León (third cousin-once removed); José Ignacio Paliza (third cousin-once removed); Víctor Bisonó (fourth cousin)
- Education: Escuela de Organización Industrial; Pontificia Universidad Católica Madre y Maestra

Orlando Salvador Jorge Villegas (born 2 February 1991) is a Dominican politician and journalist.

== Early life and family ==
Jorge Villegas was born on 2 February 1991 into a prominent upper class white family from Santiago, Dominican Republic with political connections. His parents are Patricia Villegas, diplomat, and Orlando Jorge Mera, politician and lawyer. He has one sister. His paternal grandfather Salvador Jorge Blanco was President of the Dominican Republic from 1982 to 1986. His maternal great-great-grandfather Faustino de Soto was Senator for El Seibo Province in the 19th century. He is also descended from General Ramón Santana, the twin brother of Lieutenant-General Pedro Santana, 1st President of the Dominican Republic and Marquis of Las Carreras. Jorge Villegas studied social communication at the Pontificia Universidad Católica Madre y Maestra. He has a master from Escuela de Organización Industrial.

Ancestors of Orlando Jorge Villegas

16. Pedro María Jorge Domínguez (1860–1944)
8. General Pedro María Jorge Arias (1898–1982)
17. Dolores Emilia Arias Castillo (1880–1966)
4. President José Salvador Omar Jorge Blanco
18. Nicanor Blanco Domínguez
9. Dilia Limbert Blanco Polanco
19. Antigua Polanco
2. Minister Orlando Jorge Mera (1966–2022); Santiago de los Caballeros, Dominican Republic
20. Sebastián Mera Alonso (1841–1916); Asturias, Spain
10. Sebastián Alfonso Mera Ureña (1897–1986)
21. Felicia del Carmen Ureña Estévez (1857–1933)
5. Asela Altagracia Mera Checo
22. Juan de Mata Checo Peralta
11. Leticia Checo y Checo
23. Florentina Checo Rodríguez
1. Orlando Salvador Jorge Villegas (born 1991)
24. Senator Faustino de Soto Noboa
12. Faustino José de Soto Durán
25. Candelaria Durán Santana
6. Víctor Manuel Villegas
26. Manuel Rodolfo Leyba Primet
13. Gloria Villegas
27. Altagracia Villegas
3. Ambassador Patricia Selma Villegas García (born 1969); Santiago de los Caballeros, Dominican Republic
28. Manuel de Jesús Pichardo
14. Manuel de Jesús Pichardo Ureña
29. Gregoria Ureña
7. Amada Antonia García Pichardo
15. Reina de los Ángeles García Rodríguez

== Television and radio ==
Jorge Villegas has been press director of "Antena Latina", director of "Antena Noticias 7".

He has also worked in Telenoticias from 2010.

Since 2020 Jorge works at El Sol de la Mañana.

== Political career ==
Jorge Villegas, a member of the Modern Revolutionary Party, was elected to the Chamber of Deputies of the Dominican Republic for the National District in June 2022 and took office on 16 August.

He is a member of the Parliamentary Group of Dominican-Brazilian Friendship.
