= Micaela Antonia Rivera de Soto =

Dominican independence activist (1785–1854)

Micaela Antonia Rivera de Soto (July 5, 1785 – December 12, 1854) was the first lady of the Dominican Republic during the presidencies of her husband, Pedro Santana. She made cartridges for Dominican soldiers in the Dominican War of Independence. She collaborated financially with the purchase of ships that defended the Dominican coast and assisted the wounded in the war accompanied by her daughter.

== Biography ==
Micaela Antonia de Rivera was born on July 5, 1785 in the historic town of Hincha (now Hinche), legitimate daughter of Pedro de Rivera and Antonia de Soto. At the age of 20, Micaela married Miguel Febles, a prominent soldier in the Battle of Palo Hincado, who gave birth to three boys: Ramón, Secundino, Miguel and a girl, Froilana.

Both the families of Miguel Febles Vallenilla and Micaela Antonia Rivera de Soto were very wealthy. The marriage made them one of the most economically powerful families in the country. Their subsequent union with the Santana Families was decisive for the materialization of Independence and for the maintenance of the Dominican Army against the military aggressions from Haiti.

Rivera Soto owned extensive ranches when in 1828 she married for the second time to Pedro Santana, after the death of her first husband, leaving no descendants. Being Santana's wife, Micaela and her daughter Froilana Febles, who married Ramón Santana, Pedro's twin brother, stood out making cartridges" for the Seibano soldiers who formed part of the army that defeated the Haitians in the first battles of Dominican independence. In addition, she gave her most valuable possessions to pay for the first ships that would sail in the waters of the Dominican Republic, forming the flotilla in charge of the defense of the Dominican coasts.

Micaela Rivera, along with her daughter, also served as an informant to Pedro Santana and the men who accompanied him while they remained hidden planning the independence attack.

Micaela Rivera Soto died in the province of El Seibo on December 12, 1854.

== See also ==
- Pedro Santana
- Dominican War of Independence
