= Orlando Jorge Mera =

Dominican politician (1966–2022)

Minister of Environment and Natural Resources
- In office 16 August 2020 – 6 June 2022
- Preceded by: Ángel Estévez
- Succeeded by: Raquel Peña de Antuña (acting)

Director-General of INDOTEL
- In office 16 August 2000 – 16 August 2004
- Preceded by: Francisco Frías Lara
- Succeeded by: José Alfredo Rizek

Personal details
- Born: 22 November 1966 Santiago de los Caballeros, Dominican Republic
- Died: 6 June 2022 (aged 55) Santo Domingo, Dominican Republic
- Cause of death: Assassination by gunshot
- Party: Modern Revolutionary Party (2014–2022)
- Other political affiliations: Dominican Revolutionary Party (prior 2014)
- Spouse: Patricia Villegas (m. 1991)
- Children: 2, including Orlando
- Parents: Salvador Jorge Blanco (father); Asela Mera (mother)
- Occupation: politician, television personality
- Profession: lawyer

Orlando Jorge Mera (22 November 1966 – 6 June 2022) was a Dominican Republic politician, television host and producer, environmental manager, and lawyer, Minister of Environment and Natural Resources from 2020 until his assassination in 2022. He previously served as Director-General of the Dominican Institute of Telecommunications. He was a member of the Modern Revolutionary Party.

== Early life and education ==
Orlando Jorge Mera was born in Santiago de los Caballeros, Dominican Republic on 22 November 1966. His parents were Salvador Jorge Blanco and Asera Altagracia Mera Checo, President and First Lady of the Dominican Republic from 1982 to 1986.

Jorge Mera studied at the San Ignacio de Loyola school, graduating in 1984. In 1991, he received a degree in law, summa cum laude, from the Pontifical Catholic University Mother and Teacher (PUCMM). He was a professor of Media Law, Administrative Law and Introduction to Law, both at PUCMM and at the Universidad Iberoamericana (UNIBE).

== Career ==
Jorge Mera was a coordinator of various permanent commissions of the Senate of the Dominican Republic from 1998 to 2000. He was also the coordinator of the National Commission for the Protection of Intellectual Property Rights, representing the country at the world stage in this field.

From 2000 to 2004, during the Hipólito Mejía administration, he served as Director-General of the Dominican Institute of Telecommunications (INDOTEL), the country's regulatory body for telecommunications. He was also a member of the negotiating team in international trade talks that led to the signing of the Dominican Republic–Central America Free Trade Agreement in 2004.

Also in 2004, he began producing and hosting his weekly talk show Líderes TV (Leaders TV). He analyzed current national and international issues and interviewed newsmakers and government leaders on television every Sunday morning for more than 18 years.

He was a member of the Dominican Revolutionary Party and served as its general secretary. He later became a founding member of the Modern Revolutionary Party in 2014, and served as the party's acting president between 2015 and 2019.

Jorge Mera was appointed as Minister of Environment and Natural Resources of the Dominican Republic in August 2020 by then President-elect Luis Abinader. Upon taking office, he vowed to work for the "responsible use of natural resources, to protect ecosystems and slash pollution", with a focus on enforcement of rules and regulations. By the time he was assassinated in 2022, more than 2,000 individuals and companies had been brought to justice for violating environmental laws.

== Death ==
Jorge Mera was gunned down by Miguel Cruz, a construction businessman (whose company extracted stone materials from rivers) and owner of an armory who was affected by Jorge Mera's strict environmental policies against the depredation of rivers. Jorge Mera was shot to death in his office at the Ministry of Environment and Natural Resources in Santo Domingo on 6 June 2022. Cruz confessed to a local priest after killing Jorge Mera and was arrested in the church. They were childhood friends, since Cruz's father, Major General Fausto Miguel Cruz, was a leader in the Dominican Air Force during the presidency of Jorge Blanco, Jorge Mera's father.

Dominican President Luis Abinader decreed three days of national mourning.

The Vice President of the Dominican Republic, Raquel Peña de Antuña, acted as Minister of the Environment until the next minister was appointed by the President.

On 26 April 2023, his assassin was sentenced to 30 years in prison, the maximum penalty in the Dominican Republic.

== Personal life and family ==
Jorge Mera was married to Patricia Villegas, ambassador of the Dominican Republic to Brazil, and they had one son, Orlando Jorge Villegas (deputy), and one daughter, Patricia Victoria Jorge Villegas (a nun of the Heralds of the Gospel). His sister Dilia Leticia Jorge Mera is the Dominican Deputy Minister of Innovation, Transparency and Citizen Attention.

He was a noted beekeeper.
