= Manuel de Regla Mota =

5th President of the Dominican Republic (1856–1856)

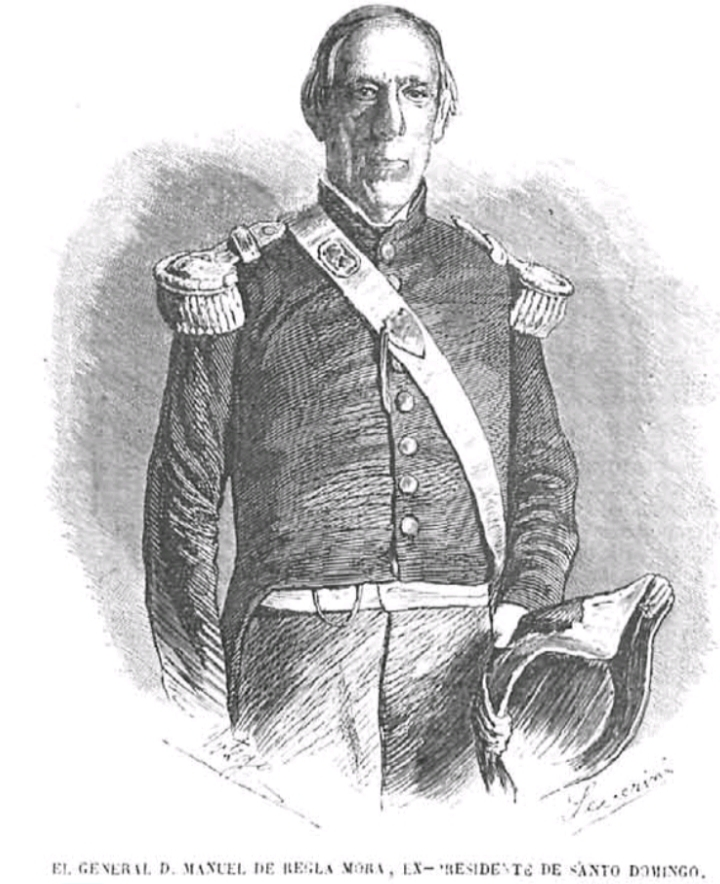
- 1862 portrait of General Manuel de Regla Mota

5th President of the Dominican Republic
- In office May 26, 1856 – October 8, 1856
- Vice President: Antonio Abad Alfau; Buenaventura Báez
- Preceded by: Pedro Santana
- Succeeded by: Buenaventura Báez

2nd Vice President of the Dominican Republic
- In office February 15, 1854 – May 26, 1856
- President: Pedro Santana
- Preceded by: Felipe Benicio Alfau
- Succeeded by: Antonio Abad Alfau

Personal details
- Born: November 21, 1795 Baní, Peravia, Dominican Republic
- Died: May 1, 1864 (aged 68) Baní, Peravia, Dominican Republic
- Spouse: Ana Joaquina Carmona Gonzalez
- Children: Ezequiel María Mota Carmona Margarita Mota Carmona 1821– José Antonio Mota Carmona 1822–1891 Manuel María De Regla Mota Carmona 1824– Eugenio Mota Carmona 1826– María Valentina Mota Carmona 1827– Juan Gregorio Mota Carmona 1829– María Altagracia Mota Carmona 1832- Francisco Luis Mota Carmona 1836– María De La Merced Mota Carmona 1838– María Encarnación Mota Carmona 1840–

Manuel de Regla Mota y Álvarez (November 21, 1795 – May 1, 1864) was a Dominican military figure and politician. Mota served as the 5th president of the Dominican Republic from May 26, 1856, until October 8, 1856. Prior to that he served as the country's vice president under Pedro Santana.

== Birth ==
Born on November 21, 1795, in Baní, Peravia, Dominican Republic. He is the son of Antonio Mota and María Álvarez.

== Political and military career ==
When the country's independence was declared in 1844, De Regla had already managed to develop a successful military career and served as colonel of the National Militias.

Once the First Dominican Republic was proclaimed, the separatist movement commissioned him to lead the first contingent of troops in the cities of Baní and San Cristóbal with the mission of defending the border line of the island. In his new role, he met Pedro Santana, named the country's first president, who became his political mentor and offered him high responsibilities in his government such as the Ministry of War and Navy and, later, the vice presidency of the Republic.

When Santana resigned as head of State on 26 May 1856, De Regla assumed the presidential position although, a few months later, the strong pressure he received from the Spanish government forced him to leave the National Palace and leave power in the hands of Buenaventura Báez, the eternal political enemy of the "Santanistas". The new government unleashed political persecution against Santana who had to resort to exile. De Regla accompanied his friend in exile until both were able to return to the country after the outbreak of the revolution of July 1857.

Back in the Dominican Republic, Santana assumed the leadership of the revolutionary army and De Regla was in charge of organizing military operations in the province of Azua where, with Santana as the new president of the country, he received the appointment of civil governor in 1859.

== Last years and death ==
Fearing a new Haitian invasion, Santana proclaimed annexation to Spain in 1861 and, in a new show of loyalty to his protector and friend, De Regla supported the decision of his political superior. In the new government he held the position of administrative advisor, a role he maintained until his death in 1864.

== See also ==
- List of presidents of the Dominican Republic

Political offices
Preceded by Felipe Benicio Alfau Bustamante	Vice President of the Dominican Republic; 1854-1856	Succeeded by Antonio Abad Alfau Bustamante
Preceded by Pedro Santana	President of the Dominican Republic; 1856	Succeeded by Buenaventura Báez
