= Antonio Guzmán Fernández =

President of the Dominican Republic from 1978 to 1982

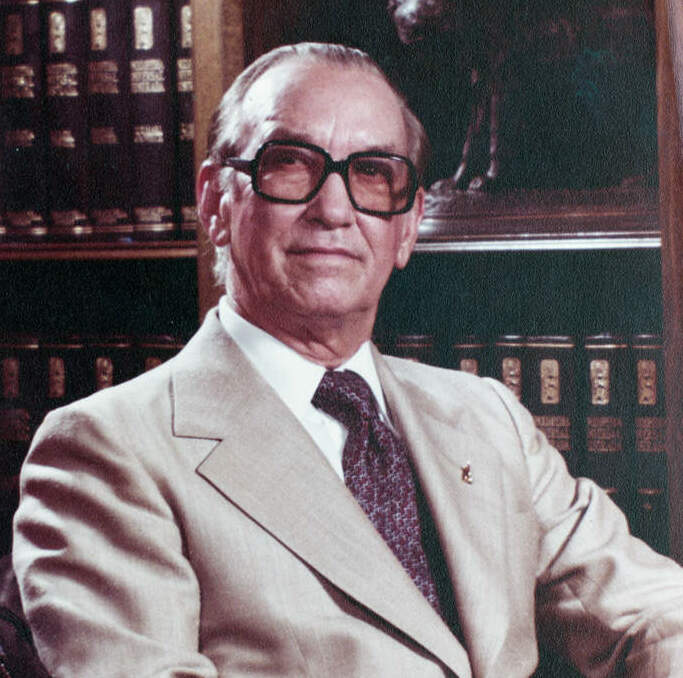
- Official portrait, 1978

46th President of the Dominican Republic
- In office 16 August 1978 – 4 July 1982
- Vice President: Jacobo Majluta
- Preceded by: Joaquín Balaguer
- Succeeded by: Jacobo Majluta

Personal details
- Born: 12 February 1911 La Vega, Dominican Republic
- Died: 4 July 1982 (aged 71) Santo Domingo, Dominican Republic
- Cause of death: Suicide by gunshot
- Party: PRD
- Spouse: Renée Klang (m. 1939)
- Profession: Agronomist; Businessman

Sylvestre Antonio Guzmán Fernández (12 February 1911 – 4 July 1982), best known as Antonio Guzmán, was a Dominican businessman and politician who served as the 46th president of the Dominican Republic from 1978 until his death in 1982. In 1978, Guzmán ran in the general elections against strongman Joaquín Balaguer, who at the time had ruled the country for 12 years and during that period, repressed, jailed, and killed political opponents.

The military stopped counting after the polls showed an unmistakable favour of Guzmán, but then resumed after protests at home and pressure internationally, and Guzmán won. During his presidency, the country turned in a more democratic direction and was characterized by a strong respect for civil liberties, a condition practically nonexistent in Dominican history in the 20th century. Guzmán helped author the Dominican democratic consecration, when the alternation of political parties in the State was verified for the first time through elections.

On 4 July 1982, Guzmán committed suicide. He was succeeded by his vice president, Jacobo Majluta, who served the remainder of Guzmán's 43-day term before handing over power to Salvador Jorge Blanco.

== Early life ==
Antonio Guzmán was born 12 February 1911 in the town of La Vega in the Dominican Republic. His family was of Criollo Spanish descent. He studied in the primary and secondary schools of La Vega.

He worked in the fruit exportation business and soon became a wealthy rancher as well.

An early member of Juan Bosch’s Dominican Revolutionary Party, he served as secretary of agriculture in Bosch's brief 1963 administration. In May 1966 he was the vice-presidential candidate for the PRD, with Bosch as the candidate for president. The elections were won, however, by Joaquín Balaguer.

He ran for president in 1974 as the candidate of a united opposition ticket. However, he pulled out after Balaguer changed the rules in a way that the opposition felt was unfair and undemocratic.

== Presidency ==
Guzmán ran for president again in 1978 as the PRD candidate, with Jacobo Majluta as his running mate. When election returns showed an unmistakable trend in Guzmán's favor, the military stopped the count. However, amid vigorous protests at home and strong pressure abroad, the count resumed. When the returns were all in, Guzmán handed Balaguer the first loss of his electoral career. When Balaguer left office that year, it marked the first time in the Dominican Republic's history that an incumbent president peacefully surrendered power to an elected member of the opposition.

Guzmán's political plan was to move slowly to reform the social and economic aspects of the Dominican Republic, while he tried to have direct contact with the armed forces because of their threat concerning pressure in the political field. To directly attack the last problem, he implemented a program that reassigned or even removed officers who were skeptical of his plans and also promoted younger officers who stood behind Guzmán. This new program also called for an institution for more formal training for officers and personnel that enlisted in the armed forces. This program proved to be a great success, and it was a major part of the legacy Guzmán left behind.

Politically though, there was not a lot Guzmán could do because he was restrained to some extent since the majority of Congress consisted of Balaguer's Reformist Party—which gave them benefits when it came to vetoing the different reforms Guzmán wished to launch. Since Guzmán was a wealthy cattle rancher—he knew how to implement well-mapped economic policies. He also helped make the nation's public transportation system better and increased minimum wage. But even though Guzmán made many reforms that were beneficial to the country, he was still criticized for not responding to the economic decline. One big event that made the criticism even stronger was Hurricane David that hit in 1979, which slowed the economy even more.

== Illness and suicide ==
In June 1982, during the midst of a Santiago Province senatorial campaign, Secretary of Agriculture Hipólito Mejía was advised to visit Guzmán after being informed that the president was unwell. Guzmán was found by Mejía crying at a beachside, stating uncertainty about the future of the Dominican Republic. Mejìa, who had maintained healthy relations with Guzmán, subsequently alerted Renée Klang, the president's wife, of concerns about his deteriorating mental state; they were repeatedly dismissed.

Guzmán was invited to a dinner at Hipólito's house three days later, where Hipólito's wife noted the president's unusual behavior and uncleanliness. Hipólito visited a psychiatrist to relay his wife's concerns, but rejected the psychiatrist's suspicions that Guzmán was suffering from depression, stating that "Guzmán basically invented anti-depression", and that he did not believe the president would act in such a manner.

Guzmán was found dead from a self-inflicted gunshot on 4 July 1982 at 4 AM AST (8 AM UTC). His death was ruled a possible suicide by the government, and Vice President Jacobo Majluta Azar assumed acting presidential powers for the remaining 43 days of Guzmán's four-year term.

Political offices
Preceded by Joaquín Balaguer	President of the Dominican Republic; 1978–1982	Succeeded by Jacobo Majluta
