= Santos López Pelegrín =

Spanish journalist and writer

Santos López Pelegrín (1801–1846) was a Spanish journalist and writer.
