= Jacobo Majluta =

President of the Dominican Republic in 1982

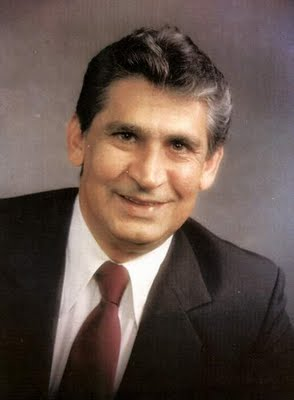
- Official portrait, 1982

47th President of the Dominican Republic
- In office 4 July 1982 – 16 August 1982
- Vice President: Vacant
- Preceded by: Antonio Guzmán Fernández
- Succeeded by: Salvador Jorge Blanco

32nd Vice President of the Dominican Republic
- In office 16 August 1978 – 4 July 1982
- President: Antonio Guzmán Fernández
- Preceded by: Carlos R. Goico
- Succeeded by: Manuel Fernández Mármol

Personal details
- Born: 9 October 1934 Santo Domingo, Dominican Republic
- Died: 2 March 1996 (aged 61) Tampa, Florida, U.S
- Party: PRD
- Other political affiliations: PRI
- Spouse: Ana Elisa Villanueva (m. 1962)
- Children: 1
- Parents: Jacobo Majluta Sgallar (father); Elena Azar Azar (mother)
- Education: Universidad Autónoma de Santo Domingo
- Profession: Accountant

Jacobo Majluta Azar (9 October 1934 – 2 March 1996) was 47th president of the Dominican Republic for a month in 1982. He was previously the 32nd vice president under President Antonio Guzmán Fernández from 1978 until his accession to the presidency. Following Fernández's death in July 1982, Majluta completed his term and handed over power to Salvador Jorge Blanco the following month.

Majulta is remembered by Dominicans as a highly capable administrator whose grand ambitions were thwarted by fierce political infighting.

== Biography ==
Born in 1934 into a merchant family of Lebanese origin, Majluta studied finance at the Universidad Autónoma de Santo Domingo before working as an accountant in the banking and state sectors. He married Ana Elisa Villanueva on April 17, 1962. The couple had one daughter, Consuelo Elena.

Majluta joined the Dominican Revolutionary Party (PRD) in 1961, in the wake of the dictator Leonidas Trujillo's assassination, and rose quickly, becoming the youngest minister in Juan Bosch's short-lived government of 1963. He was Minister of Finance. When it was overthrown by a military coup later that year, Majluta went into exile, returning to rebuild his political career and winning the PRD's vice-presidential nomination for the 1978 elections.

After Guzmán's suicide, Majluta attempted to win the PRD's presidential nomination, but lost out to Salvador Jorge Blanco. When Jorge Blanco won the 1982 elections, Majluta became president of the senate, using his position to side with the opposition and block his rival's policy program. As Jorge Blanco's administration gradually slid into bankruptcy and scandal, Majluta again aimed for the PRD's nomination. This time, however, he faced the formidable José Francisco Peña Gómez, and open war broke out between the two men's factions. After several rival supporters were killed in shoot- outs, Majluta finally grabbed the nomination for 1986. Despite his considerable political skills, Majluta lost in the elections that year to Joaquín Balaguer, the old Caudillo of Dominican politics. Balaguer defeated Majluta by a narrow margin to return to the presidency at the age of 80. The brutal in-fighting which had won Majluta the PRD ticket had also alienated a large section of the party, and many of the PRD faithful voted against their own candidate.

Majluta did not enhance his standing by claiming victory as soon as voting ended and by demanding a rerun of the election. In the end a series of meetings with emissaries from the military and Church forced him to accept defeat.

=== Post-presidency ===
In 1987, Majluta was expelled from the PRD as Peña Gómez reasserted his influence, but an electoral court ruled the move illegal. In 1989, he left to form his own Independent Revolutionary Party (PRI), an organization geared specifically towards his own electoral aspirations. The PRI never gained genuine popular support, but the 7 per cent it won in the 1990 election was enough to undermine Peña Gómez's chances.

In the weeks before his death, Majluta sought a rapprochement with Peña Gómez and endorsed his candidature for the forthcoming May elections.

Majluta was diagnosed with lung cancer. He travelled to the United States for medical treatment, where he died on March 2, 1996 in Tampa, Florida.

Political offices
Preceded by Carlos R. Goico	Vice President of the Dominican Republic; 16 August 1978 – 4 July 1982	Succeeded by None
Preceded by Antonio Guzmán	President of the Dominican Republic; 4 July 1982 – 16 August 1982	Succeeded by Salvador Jorge Blanco
Preceded by ?	Member of the Senate for Santo Domingo; 1982–1986	Succeeded by Jacinto Peynado Garrigosa
