= Froilana Febles =

Dominican independence activist (1814–1888)

Froilana Febles Rivera (1814 – July 29, 1888) was a Dominican independence fighter. She made cartridges for the soldiers who would become part of the forces that defeated the Haitians in the first battles of the Dominican War of Independence. Febles sacrificed her clothes and her assets to buy the first ships that were to form the national fleet, in charge of the defense of the Dominican coasts in 1844.

== Life ==
Froilana Febles Rivera was born in El Seibo in 1814. She was the legitimate daughter, with three other brothers, of Miguel Febles Vallenilla, a hero of the Spanish reconquest of Santo Domingo; he fought bravely in the Battle of Palo Hincado, after which he retired from military services and died in El Seibo on December 12, 1824. Her mother, Micaela Antonia Rivera de Soto, was an owner of extensive ranches.

Some time later, her mother married Pedro Santana in 1828, but produced no children. Her mother being Santana's wife, Froilana and her mother stood out in the manufacture of cartridges for the Seibano soldiers who would become part of the army that defeated the Haitians in the first battles of the Dominican War of Independence and were the communication link for their husbands, Pedro and Ramón Santana, when they remained hidden preparing the liberating coup in the eastern region. Febles sacrificed, along with her mother, their clothes and their assets for the purchase of the first ships that were to form the national fleet, in charge of the defense of the Dominican coasts in 1844.

Froilana Febles married in her hometown on September 21, 1829 with Ramón Santana, twin brother of Pedro Santana, with whom she had the following children: Manuel (b. 1833), María Francisca (b. 1840), who married on January 13, 1851 the hero General Deogracia Linares, Rafael (b. 1836), Estebanía (b. 1835), Petronila (b. 1837), Agustín (b. 1839) and María de Jesús Santana Febles (b. 1842). Only Manuel, María Francisca and Rafael reached adulthood. Widowed by the death of General Ramón Santana, which occurred on June 15, 1844, Froilana Febles married for the second time in El Seibo on January 19, 1851 with Ramón Pérez Almanzar, from which marriage there were the following children: Nicanor, who although he was not a political militant, held several important positions as well as Pedro, who held a Secretary of State and the governorship of the eastern provinces, Pedro Alejandrino and Eloísa, who married General Julián Zorrilla.

Due to her opposition to the six-year dictatorship of Báez, Froilana Febles was expatriated and resided in Puerto Rico. There she acquired some knowledge of medicine and pharmacy and upon her return she dedicated herself to the sale of medicines in El Seibo and worked as a doctor. She died in her hometown on July 29, 1888, and was buried under the vaults of the parish church.
