= Patricia Villegas =

Dominican lawyer, diplomat (born 1969)

Ambassador of the Dominican Republic to Brazil
- Incumbent
- Assumed office 2021
- President: Luis Abinader
- Preceded by: Alejandro Arias Zarzuela

Personal details
- Born: Patricia Selma Villegas García; 1969 (age 56–57) Santo Domingo, Dominican Republic
- Party: Modern Revolutionary Party
- Spouse: Orlando Jorge Mera (1991–2022; his death)
- Children: 2
- Education: Pontificia Universidad Católica Madre y Maestra; Institut Catholique de Paris
- Occupation: Law professor, diplomat
- Profession: Lawyer
- Patricia Villegas on Instagram

Patricia Selma Villegas García (born 1969) is a lawyer and diplomat from the Dominican Republic.

== Early life and family ==
Villegas was born in 1969 into a modest Dominican family. Her parents were Víctor Villegas and Amada García Pichardo. Her father, Victor Villegas is a poet laureate as well as a decorated lawyer. Her mother, Amada García Pichardo, was a homemaker and mother to 9 children. Villegas is the youngest of the 9 children. Her paternal great-grandfather Faustino de Soto was Senator for El Seibo Province in the 19th century. She is also descended from General Ramón Santana (the twin brother of Lieutenant-General Pedro Santana, 1st President of the Dominican Republic and Marquis of Las Carreras) and from priest Gabriel Moreno del Christo.

She studied in the Colegio Serafín de Asís catholic school in Santo Domingo and in the Mariemont High School in Cincinnati, Ohio.

Villegas studied law at the Institut Catholique de Paris and the Pontifical Catholic University Mother and Teacher (PUCMM) and has a Masters in Business Law and Economic Law.

Ancestors of Patricia Villegas

16. Diego de Soto (1783–1870); Hincha, Captaincy General of Santo Domingo
8. Senator Faustino de Soto Noboa (1805–1883); Azua, French colony of Santo Domingo
17. Josefa Noboa (1788–1820); Azua, Captaincy General of Santo Domingo
4. Faustino José de Soto Durán
18. Isidoro Durán; Bayaguana, Captaincy General of Santo Domingo
9. Candelaria Durán Santana; Higüey, Haitian-occupied Santo Domingo
19. María de los Ángeles Santana Febles; Higüey, Captaincy General of Santo Domingo
2. Víctor Manuel Villegas
20. Josephus Martinus Leyba Schoonewolff; Curaçao, Dutch Antilles
10. Manuel Rodolfo Leyba Primet
21. Clara Eusebia Primet Newman (1833–1901); Curaçao, Dutch Antilles
5. Gloria Villegas
22. Gabriel Benito Moreno del Christo (1831–1905); Santo Domingo
11. Altagracia Villegas
23. Celimena Villegas
1. Patricia Selma Villegas García (born 19); Santiago de los Caballeros, Dominican Republic
12. Manuel de Jesús Pichardo
6. Manuel de Jesús Pichardo Ureña
13. Gregoria Ureña
3. Amada Antonia García Pichardo
7. Reina de los Ángeles García Rodríguez

== Career ==
She was professor of Intellectual Property Law at the PUCMM.

She co-founded the law firm Jorge Mera & Villegas with Orlando Jorge Mera and is a member of the International Federation of Intellectual Property Attorneys.

Villegas is a devout Roman Catholic and belongs to Heralds of the Gospel and cooperates with the Opus Dei.

Since 2021 Villegas is serving as the Dominican Republic Ambassador to Brazil.

== Personal life ==
Villegas married to Orlando Jorge Mera in 1991 and had 2 children: Orlando and Patricia Jorge Villegas.

Her husband was assassinated in 2022.
