= Pedro Santana =

President of the Dominican Republic (1861–1862)

His Excellency The Marquess of Las Carreras
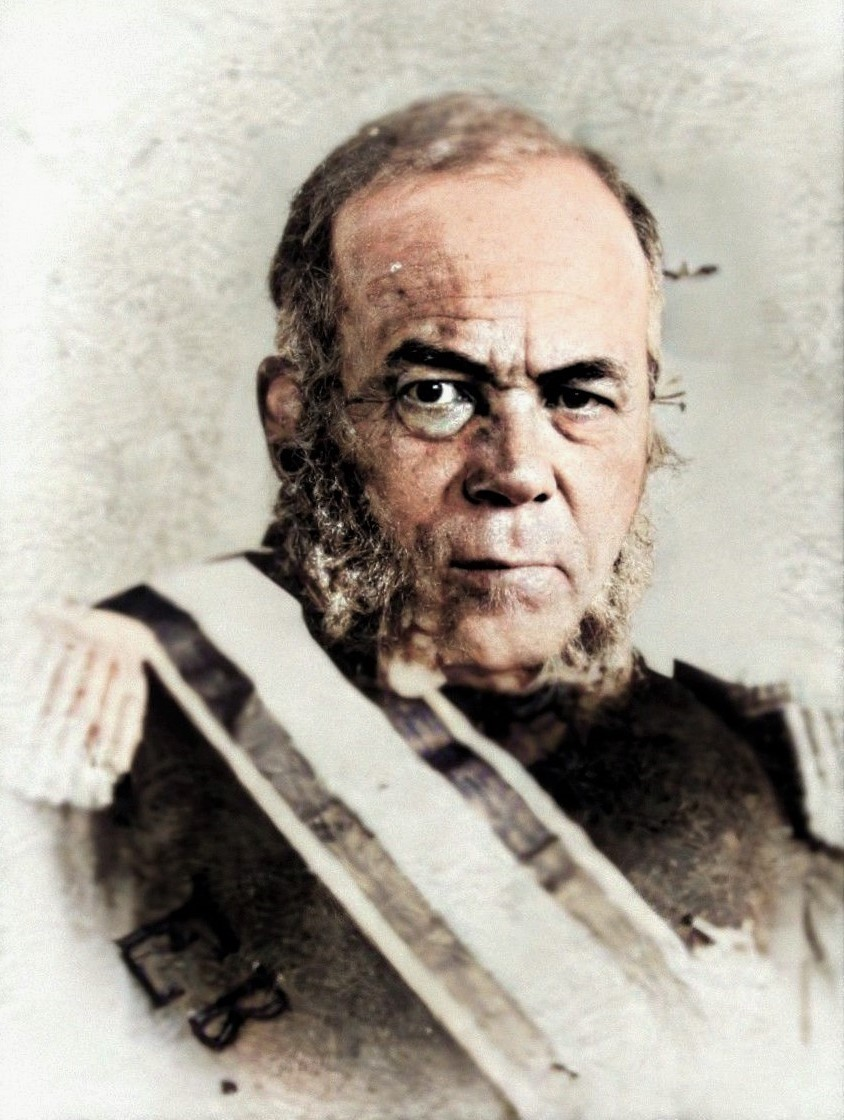
- Colour portrait of Pedro Santana

President of the Dominican Republic
- In office September 14, 1844 – August 4, 1848
- Vice President: None
- Preceded by: Francisco del Rosario Sánchez
- Succeeded by: Council of Secretaries of State
- In office May 30, 1849 – September 23, 1849
- Preceded by: Manuel Jimenes
- Succeeded by: Buenaventura Báez
- In office February 15, 1853 – May 26, 1856
- Vice President: Felipe Benicio Alfau (1853); Manuel de Regla Mota (1853–1856)
- Preceded by: Buenaventura Báez
- Succeeded by: Manuel de Regla Mota
- In office August 31, 1858 – March 18, 1861
- Vice President: Benigno Filomeno de Rojas (1858–1861)
- Preceded by: José Desiderio Valverde
- Succeeded by: Himself as Governor-General (annexation to Spain)

Governor-General of Santo Domingo
- In office March 18, 1861 – July 20, 1862
- Preceded by: Himself as President (first Dominican Republic)
- Succeeded by: Felipe Ribero

Personal details
- Born: June 29, 1801 Hinche, Captaincy General of Santo Domingo under French rule
- Died: June 14, 1864 (aged 62) Santo Domingo, Captaincy General of Santo Domingo
- Spouse(s): 1. Micaela Antonia Rivera de Soto; 2. Ana Zorrilla
- Relations: Octavio Antonio Beras Rojas (great-great-grandnephew)
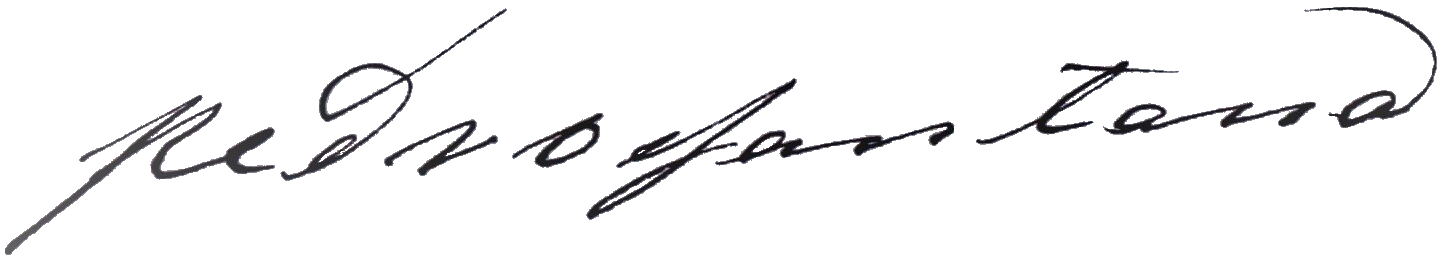
- Signature

Military service
- Allegiance: Dominican Republic; Spain
- Branch/service: Dominican Army; Spanish Army
- Years of service: 1843–1864
- Rank: Divisional General
- Battles/wars: Dominican War of Independence; Cibaeño Revolution; Dominican Restoration War

Pedro Santana y Familias, 1st Marquess of Las Carreras (June 29, 1801 – June 14, 1864) was a Dominican soldier and politician who served three times as the president of the First Dominican Republic (1844–1861) and was the first governor-general during the period of Spanish annexation of the Dominican Republic (1861–1865), accomplished at Santana's request. Called "Libertador de la Patria" in life, Santana is today considered a dictator because of his authoritarian rule.

Santana was one of the signatories of the Manifesto of January 16, 1844 that proclaimed Dominican independence on February 27, 1844. He would assume the leadership of the southern expeditionary army and gain prominence for his victory in the Battle of Azua. He led a coup d'état against the Central Governing Board and was named president on a provisional basis. During his government, the first constitution of the Dominican Republic was promulgated, and he was designated the first constitutional president of the Dominican Republic. However in 1848 Santana resigned due to political intrigues and popular discontent.

Following the death of Haitian President Jean-Baptiste Riché in 1847, General Faustin Soulouque became President of Haiti and led an expedition into the Dominican Republic in March 1849. Due to the inaction of Dominican president Manuel Jimenes, the Dominican congress called on Santana to repel Soulouque. Santana led the successful defense against Haitian forces at the Battle of Las Carreras in April 1849. He then deposed Jimenes and served as head of state under the title of Supreme Chief until a new president was elected. Congress made him General in Chief of the armies of the Dominican Republic and gave him the title of Liberator of the Fatherland.

In 1853, he returned to the presidency, promulgated a new constitution in 1854, obtained recognition of the independence of the Dominican Republic by many countries and resigned again in 1856. Half a year later, he was banished from the country by president Buenaventura Báez, but he returned after the start of the Cibaeño Revolution and joined the rebels. In 1858 he took the capital and deposed president José Desiderio Valverde, assuming the presidency for a third time.

Unlike his political opponents who wanted an independent Dominican state, Santana sought to reintegrate the Dominican Republic to the Spanish Empire. He oversaw the reestablishment of the Captaincy General of Santo Domingo, exiled and imprisoned a number of nationalist dissidents who had fought with him in the Dominican War of Independence. In 1862, queen Isabella II of Spain granted him the title of Marquess of Las Carreras for the reincorporation of Santo Domingo to Spain. He died during the Dominican Restoration War, after which the country regained its independence in 1865.

== Background ==
The situation the island was in before Pedro Santana's birth and in the year he was born.

In

Santana was born in 1801 the town of Hincha in the Captaincy General of Santo Domingo when it came under French control following the signing/execution of the Treaty of Basel of 1795. The same year, Toussaint Louverture occupied the Captaincy General of Santo Domingo in application of the 1795 Peace of Basel, through which Spain transferred Santo Domingo to France. Due to insecurity, Santana's parents Pedro Santana and Petronila Familias, rural cattle herders (hateros) of Canarian origin, moved east. First they stayed in Gurabo, near Santiago de los Caballeros, then in Sabana Perdida near Santo Domingo, and then in El Seibo.

Santana had a twin brother, Ramón, and a younger brother, Florencio (b. 14 November 1805), who was disabled, mute and mentally ill.

Santana's father became a militia captain and fought at the 1808 Battle of Palo Hincado under general Juan Sánchez Ramírez, during the Spanish reconquest of Santo Domingo. The elder Santana beheaded Jean-Louis Ferrand's body after his suicide and took his head as trophy.

In Sabana Perdida, Pedro and Ramón Santana frequently traveled to the city of Santo Domingo to sell firewood. In El Seibo, Santana's father acquired the El Prado herd in partnership with Miguel Febles, who had also migrated from Hinche. After the deaths of his father and Febles, Santana married Febles' widow, Micaela Antonia Rivera de Soto, who was 15 years his senior, while his brother Ramón married Febles's daughter, Froilana Febles. Because of these marriages, the Santana brothers acquired moderate wealth and great influence in El Seibo, although they never had an education.

== Haitian rule ==
In 1822, when Santana was 20 years old, Haitian president Jean-Pierre Boyer entered Santo Domingo and annexed it to the Republic of Haiti, just two months after José Núñez de Cáceres proclaimed independence as the Republic of Spanish Haiti. Boyer abolished slavery, confiscated the properties of the Catholic Church and criollo landowners, and distributed plots of land among the freedmen and others as had been done in Haiti. Although this policy was abandoned a few years later, the hateros remained opposed to the Haitians and wished to return to Spanish rule.

Following the fall of Boyer in 1843, the Dominican organization La Trinitaria conspired to proclaim independence. On May 3, 1843, the Santana brothers were approached by Juan Pablo Duarte and Vicente Celestino Duarte, the latter of which had commercial activities in Los Llanos, near El Seibo. Duarte offered the rank of colonel to Ramón Santana, but he declined in favor of Pedro. According to Ramón, "The boss must be my brother Pedro, who likes to command and knows how to understand people well; I am content to serve under his orders." Juan Esteban Aybar relayed the independence plan to Pedro, who replied "Yes, I am willing to contribute to the Revolution, but I command." Despite joining the Trinitarios, Santana did not share their political beliefs.

Due to a conflict with the Haitian Richiez family, the new president Charles Rivière-Hérard forced the Santana brothers to go daily to the Palace in Santo Domingo's Plaza de Armas, but the Santanas fled to Sabana Buey, near Baní, and hid in Los Médanos on the property of Luis Tejeda and Rosa Pimentel, from there they went to Loma del Pinto. Hérard offered a reward of 200 gourdes for the Santanas.

== First Republic ==
=== Leader of the southern army ===
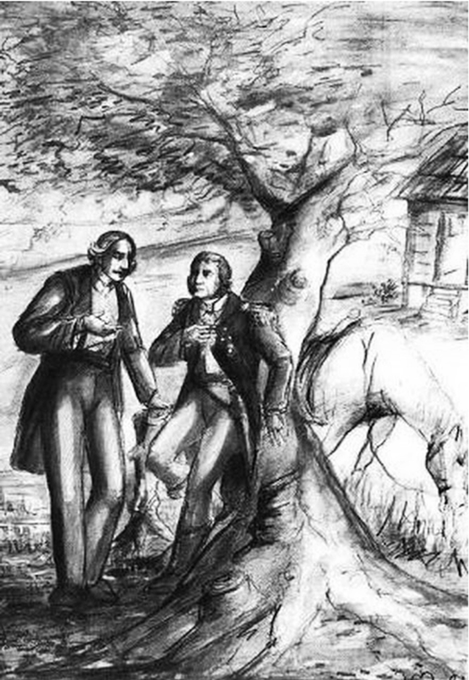
Santana conversing with Duarte

At the end of 1843, the Trinitarios led by Francisco del Rosario Sánchez reached an agreement with a part of the conservative afrancesados ("Frenchified"), led by Tomás Bobadilla. Both leaders wrote the Dominican Act of Independence (1844), which called for the proclamation of the Dominican Republic as a sovereign state. Hours before Sánchez proclaimed the Dominican Republic on February 27, 1844, Pedro and Ramón Santana took El Seibo and prepared to march on Santo Domingo. After this the Dominican Central Government Board assigned Santana de rank of general.

Santana then headed west with 3,000 men to meet the advancing army of Haitian president Hérard. On March 19, Santana defeated Hérard's army of 10,000 at the Battle of Azua, which helped Dominican morale. However, Santana cautiously fell back to Sabana Buey, allowing Hérard to enter Azua unopposed. After this Hérard did not advance further.

Juan Pablo Duarte returned from exile in Venezuela and was named general and joint chief of the southern army with Santana. Differences between the two emerged; Duarte wanted to go on the offensive, Santana to defend until France established a protectorate over the Dominican Republic, which had been requested on 8 March by the Central Government Board led by the conservative Bobadilla, before Duarte came to the country. Bobadilla then recalled Duarte to Santo Domingo.

On May 26, 1844, following the deposition of Hérard, Bobadilla publicly called for the establishment of the French protectorate, creating disagreement among the Dominicans. On June 9, the Trinitarios under Duarte expelled the conservatives from the governing board. The presidency passed to Sánchez, and Duarte was sent to Cibao to get support for the new government. In Santiago, the Trinitario Matías Ramón Mella proclaimed Duarte president of the Republic. Santana first remained cautious and submitted his resignation citing poor health, but when the Board sent colonel José Esteban Roca to replace him, the troops incited by colonel Manuel Mora proclaimed obedience to Santana. Santana then marched to Santo Domingo to overthrow the Board. The head of the capital's garrison, José Joaquín Puello, did not resist and the Board was deposed. Some Trinitarios were imprisoned, and a new Board was formed under the presidency of Santana. Cibao recognized the new government and Duarte was expelled from the country with his closest companions.

Santana's brother Ramón died on June 15, during the war of Independence.

=== First presidency ===
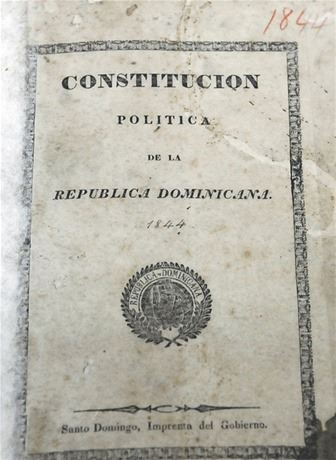
The Constitution of San Cristóbal

A constituent assembly was established in October 1844. The members of the assembly, almost all conservatives, moved to San Cristóbal in order to reduce the influence of Santana. The drafter of the 1844 Constitution and leader of the afrancesados, Buenaventura Báez, proposed that the constituents should proclaim the inviolability of their function. The Constitution, approved on November 6, designated Santana as president for two consecutive terms, but his powers were restricted. Santana refused the presidency under such conditions and, advised by Bobadilla, demanded the inclusion of article 210, which made him unaccountable for his actions. Santana subsequently used the article to execute those who opposed him.

Some liberals tried to remove the secretaries of state, which was considered a conspiracy by Santana, so he ordered the establishment of special courts which sentenced to death María Trinidad Sánchez, aunt of Francisco del Rosario Sánchez, his brother and two other people. All were executed on February 27, 1845, the first anniversary of independence. In 1847, a new conspiracy led by the then Secretary of the Interior, José Joaquín Puello, was discovered, intended to depose Santana. Puello, his brother Gabino Puello, and others were shot. Small theft was also punished with the death penalty, as exemplified when an elderly man named Bonifacio Paredes was shot in El Seibo for stealing bananas.

Santana also rejected the Catholic Church's request to return their properties confiscated by the Haitians, despite being a practicing Catholic himself. General Manuel Jimenes, Secretary of War and a Trinitario, led another conspiracy. Faced with growing discontent, Santana took refuge in El Prado and then offered his resignation on August 4, 1848.

=== Second presidency ===
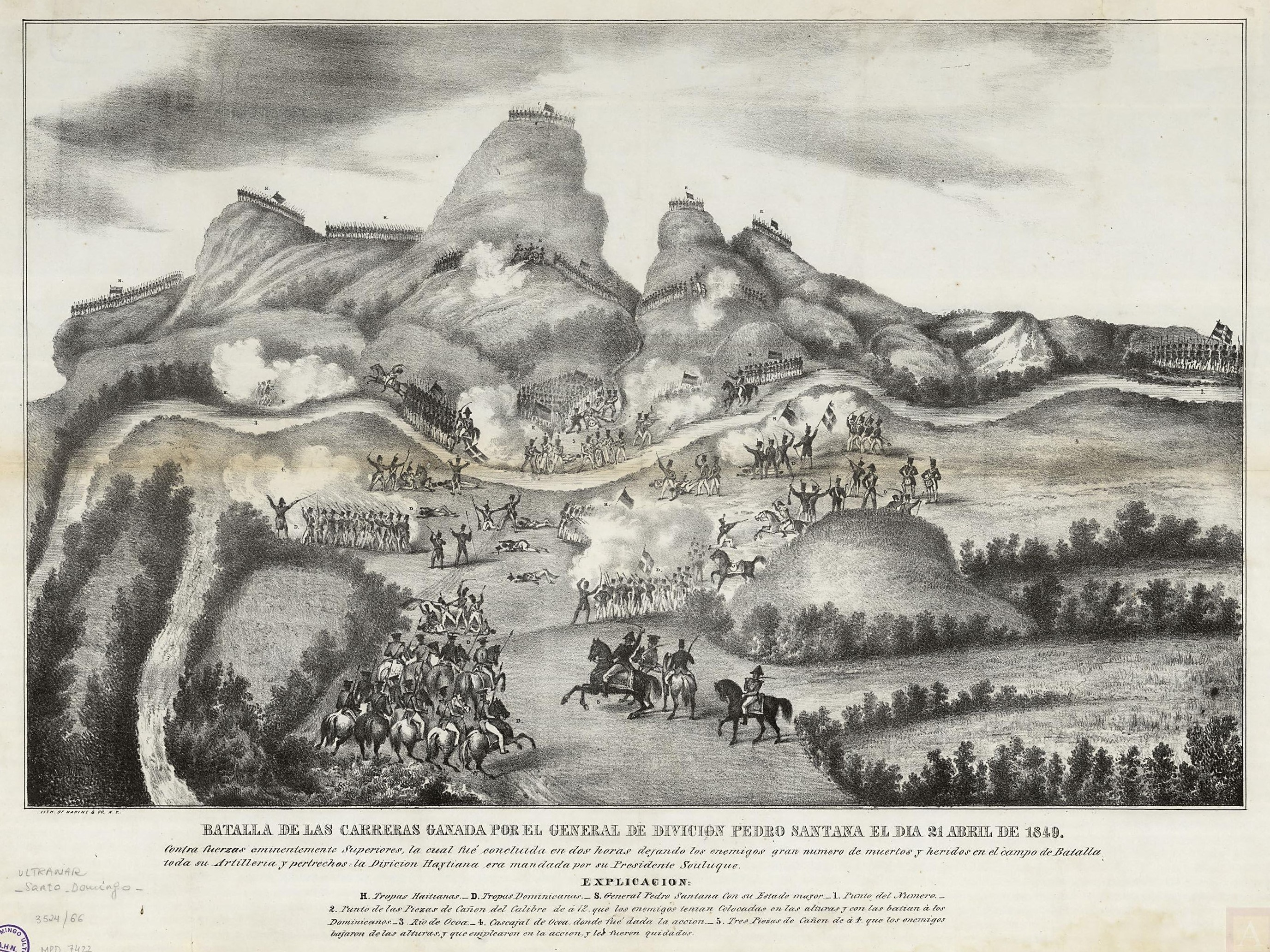
Battle of Las Carreras

Jimenes was elected by the chambers to the presidency and enacted an amnesty, allowing the exiled Trinitarios to return to the country. All did except Duarte. However, the country was then invaded by Haitian general Faustin Soulouque, who had become president two years earlier. Jimenes first appointed general Antonio Duvergé as chief of the southern army, but the legislative chambers conspired to appoint Santana as head of the army following the suggestion of Buenaventura Báez.

Santana gathered another troop of Seibanos and defeated the Haitians in the Battle of Las Carreras on the banks of the Ocoa River, on April 21, 1849. A few days later, the chambers impeached Jimenes and named Santana leader of the nation. In gratitude for his services, he was awarded the title of El Libertador, the honorary Sword of the Liberator, and his portrait was placed in the government palace along with those of Christopher Columbus and Juan Sánchez Ramírez. Santana was also granted the exploitation of Saona Island and a house in Santo Domingo. However, Santana was not interested in resuming the presidency, so the chambers focused on appointing Jimenes' replacement. Santana's favorite was Santiago Espaillat, representative of Santiago de los Caballeros, but Espaillat declined. Báez, who had led the opposition to Jimenes, was elected instead.

Between 1849 and 1853, Báez developed an efficient administration and obtained diplomatic recognition by the United Kingdom (1850), Denmark (1851), France (ratified in 1852, though informally recognized in 1848), and the Netherlands (1853). Santana decided to return to the presidency after Báez's four-year term ended; shortly after his reinstatement, he attacked Báez and expelled him from the country, polarizing the nation between them. A third Haitian invasion followed at the end of 1855, commanded again by Soulouque. Although Santana did not go to the front this time, he used the war to reaffirm his authority with constitutional reforms in February and December 1854. The latter strengthened the Executive even to a greater degree than article 210.

During Santana's second presidency, the Dominican Republic was recognized by the Kingdom of Sardinia, the United States, Spain, and the Free City of Bremen. The Dominican delegate to Spain, Matías Ramón Mella, offered the choice between annexation and recognition (showing that Santana was already considering annexation at the time), but the Spanish government, fearing the opposition of France and Britain, chose recognition.

General Duvergé conspired with the Baecists, was tried in El Seibo and shot with his son. After this the Baecists of Santo Domingo flocked to the Spanish consul Antonio María Segovia, who arrived at the end of 1855. Segovia granted Spanish nationality to any Dominican who requested it, which was used by the Baecists to protect themselves against Santana. As demonstrations against Santana proliferated, Santana chose to resign rather than come into a conflict with Spain. Santana also negotiated the lease of the Samaná Peninsula to the United States, but he canceled it due to the pressures of the consuls of Great Britain and France.

=== Third Presidency ===
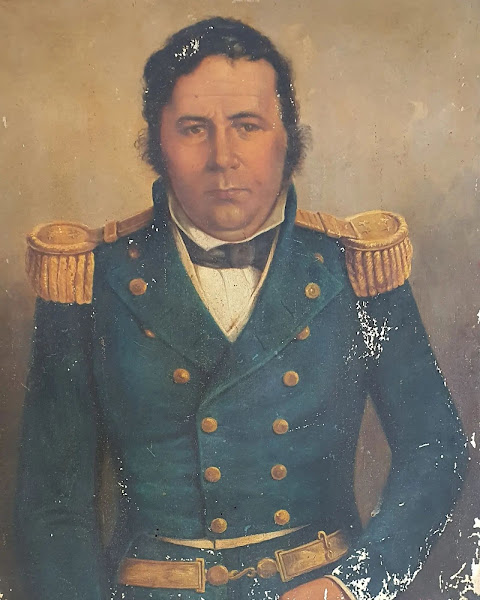
1854 portrait of Pedro Santana, by Tuto Báez.

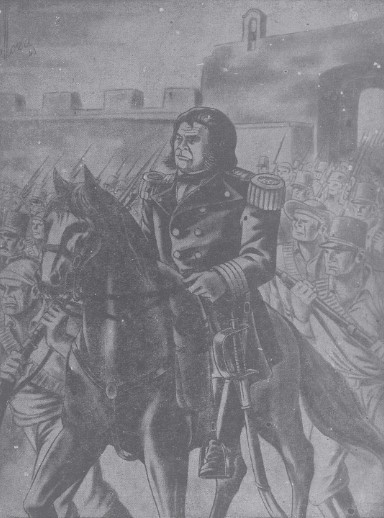
Santana reclaimed the presidency following the aftermath of the Cibaeño Revolution.

Shortly after Santana's resignation, Báez returned to the country and was appointed vice president with the intention that he immediately replace the provisional president Manuel de Regla Mota. Once president, Báez arrested Santana and deported him to Martinique on January 11, 1857. However on July 7, a liberal rebellion broke out in Santiago against Báez and installed a provisional government under José Desiderio Valverde. Valverde recalled Santana and appointed him commander in chief of military operations against Báez, who was holed in the walled capital of Santo Domingo. After an 11-month siege, Santana took the capital. Then almost immediately Santana betrayed Valverde and deposed him in July 1858.

In September, Santana's third presidency formally began. After almost a year of civil war, Dominican paper money was devalued with a price of more than 500 pesos for each peso, and discontent grew rapidly. General Domingo Ramírez defected to Haiti along with some of his subordinates. Conspiracies proliferated again. Francisco del Rosario Sánchez, a supporter of Báez, was involved in one and had to march into exile.

== Spanish service and death ==
=== Annexation to Spain ===
In 1860, Santana sent general Felipe Alfau to Spain, a member of the delegation that had visited in 1853. Envoys from the Spanish captain-general of Cuba, Francisco Serrano, arrived in Santo Domingo, and the Dominican Secretary of the Treasury, Pedro Ricart, moved to Havana. The negotiations were secret but the Spanish managed to secure support for an annexation from Britain and France.

Santana promised that reintegration would be easy because of cultural ties: "Religion, language, beliefs, and customs, all we preserve with purity."

Santana and Antonio Peláez de Campomanes negotiated the conditions for annexation in Los Llanos: Santo Domingo would be an overseas province, granting full rights to Dominicans as subjects of the Spanish monarchy; slavery, which still existed in Cuba and Puerto Rico, would not be reestablished; Santana would be the head of the local administration with the title of captain-general and the ranks of the Dominican military would be recognized, with their salaries and pensions; finally Spain would exchange the Dominican currency for Spanish currency as if it had the same value.

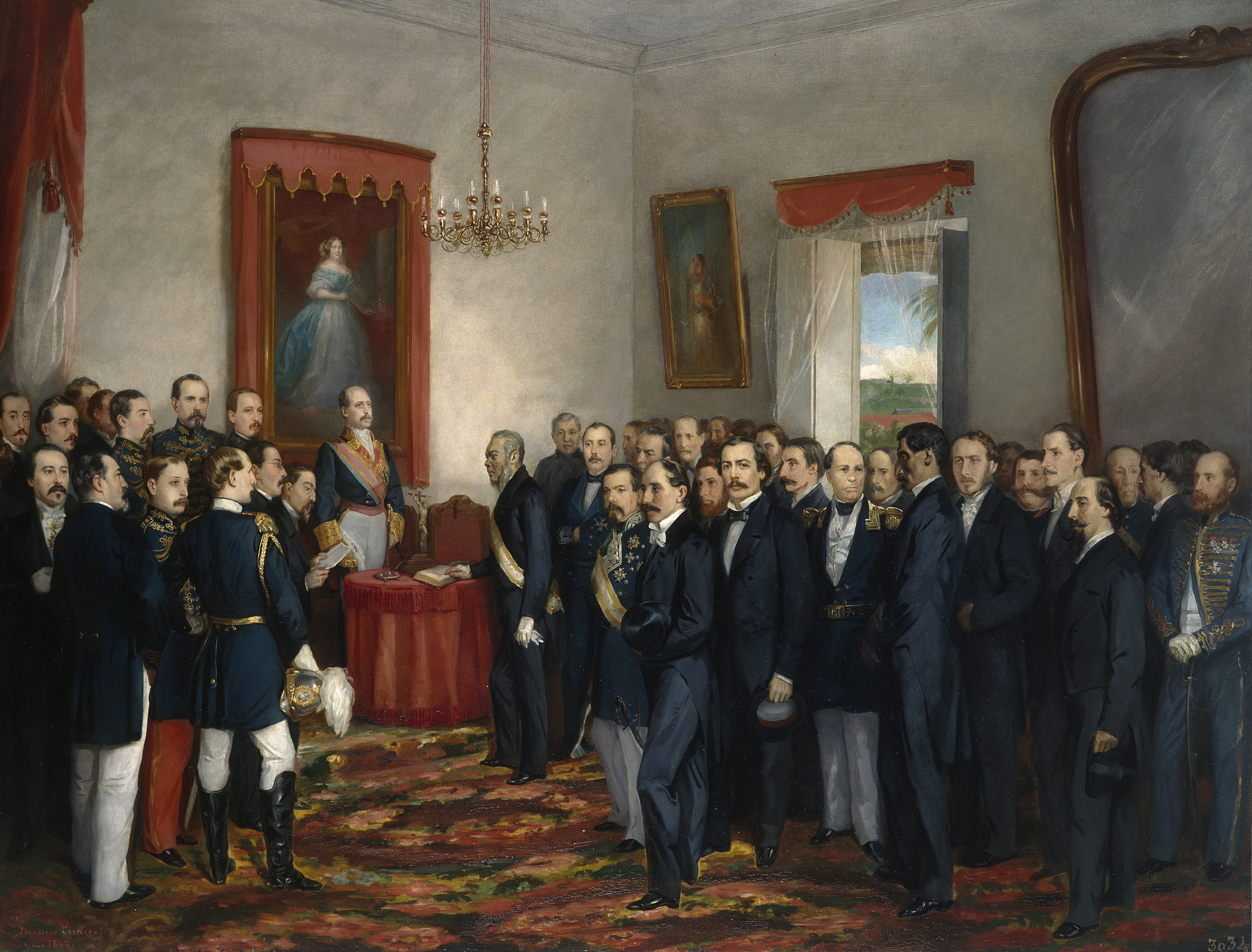
Swearing-in of Pedro Santana as governor and captain-general of Santo Domingo, by Wenceslao Cisneros (1862).

At the end of 1860, Francisco del Rosario Sánchez and José María Cabral, who had been part of Báez's presidency, launched a manifesto in Saint Thomas denouncing the annexation and calling for the deposition of Santana. Sánchez formed a Revolutionary Junta made mostly of Baecistas and moved to Haiti.

Santana issued his own counter-manifesto:

January 21, 1861

DOMINICANS!

The government that always watches over the health of the Homeland did not lose sight of the traitors who were forging their liberticidal plans from abroad: it followed their steps, discovered their secrets and prepared to render their criminal efforts useless. Already today the betrayal is manifest. The coward who has never drawn the sword in defense of the Homeland, the one who shouted that he had been one of the heroes of February 27, he takes as a pretext for disloyalty the defense of the Dominican nationality, the former General Francisco del Rosario Sánchez, in short, seeks today to the Haitians to perhaps ask them to put Domingo Ramírez's plans into action.

DOMINICANS! ALERT, you already see the ties that they set for you, you already know the plans of those men who boast so much about their Dominicanism; who have so often implored and obtained grace; You already see them today, when the Government is preparing to grant an almost general amnesty in their favor, heading to Haiti to demonstrate to you their true intentions, their false patriotism and even the lack of political modesty, which has not allowed others to change their Dominican nationality by that of his perpetual opposites.

ALERT, then, Dominicans, ALERT, comrades in arms, let us be on guard against that liberticidal faction that we will know how to teach once again if it wants to come to disturb our rest.

Trust in the strength of the Government, rest in the deep love for your country that has been for so many years and in so many battles has sealed it with your blood, and hope, finally, in that Providence that has given us Victory so many times: She will protect our weapons; and with them as always, we will win.

A conspiracy led by José Contreras was discovered in Moca and the instigators were shot. Sánchez returned to the country in June, but the population did not rise against Santana and he was captured, tried in San Juan de la Maguana on July 4, and shot along with twenty of his companions.

Spanish officials disapproved of Santana's autocratic rule and executions. They also clashed over their attempts to set up a bureaucracy not controlled by Santana's supporters, and because of the placement of Santana's troops and officers in the reserve, which the latter saw as discriminatory to Dominicans despite earning better salaries. Unable to oppose Spain, Santana offered his resignation as governor citing health reasons. It has been speculated that he expected queen Isabella II to reject the resignation, but this didn't happen. Instead, the Spanish courted Báez by naming him field marshal. In compensation, Santana was granted the title of Marquess of Las Carreras and the position of senator with a salary of 12,000 pesos. Santana returned to his ranch in El Prado.

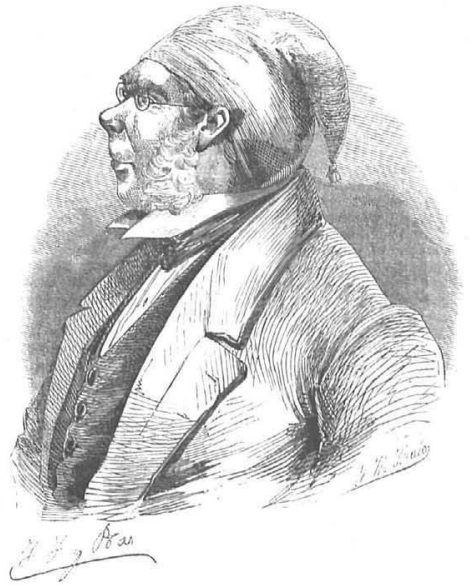
Santana after being named Marquess of Las Carreras, 1862

In February 1863 uprisings against Spanish rule broke out in Neiba, Santiago, and Guayubín, a prelude to the beginning of the Dominican Restoration War in August. In September, a Dominican provisional government was formed in Santiago.

Santana offered his military service to the Spanish, who made him head of an expeditionary army bound for Cibao. The Santiago government sent an army under Gregorio Luperón to intercept Santana. Before departing, Luperón demanded that the government declare Santana an outlaw and a traitor, and sentence him to death. Santana lost precious time not marching on Cibao before resistance was properly organized, deciding to consolidate his position in Guanuma instead. This allowed Luperón to take the strategic mountain Sillón de la Viuda before Santana. In the ensuing Battle of Arroyo Bermejo, Luperón prevailed and Santana fell back to Guanuma.

José de la Gándara y Navarro was appointed Spanish governor on March 31, 1864. He clashed with Santana, who disobeyed orders to retreat to Santo Domingo, and he had Santana summoned to the capital on charges of contempt, with the intention of taking him out of the island. However, just days after his arrival, on June 14, Santana died.

=== Post-mortem ===
Santana had no children. He bequeathed his properties to his nephews, godchildren, and stepchildren. He included a pension to his disabled brother Florencio and his aunt Dominga Familias.

Santana was buried in Santo Domingo's Fortaleza Ozama. In July 1865, as the Spanish were preparing to leave Santo Domingo, prime minister Ramón María Narváez and the conservative deputy Antonio Cánovas del Castillo unsuccessfully requested that Santana's remains be taken to the Iberian Peninsula:

I beg the Deputies of the majority to fulfill an obligation that Spain has and that we will not be able to fulfill due to the natural distrust, I recognize, that the opposition governments have. I ask the gentlemen of the majority present for an amendment, for any proposition, so that the remains of one of the most distinguished patricians, of one of the greatest glories that this century has seen in this century, are not exposed to the enemy fury of that island that Spain had, General Santana. It is impossible to remember his actions, to have complete knowledge of his patriotism and to have been able to appreciate through authentic documents everything that that noble heart felt and suffered for the cause of Spain, and not experience the feeling that moves me to pronounce these words. Do not leave, no, exposed to the ferocious instincts of his enemies the venerable relics of Santana: the ashes of Columbus have already left Santo Domingo and have stopped in Cuba! God grant that for a long time! Also take out those of General Santana, and bring these to Spain!

On January 9, 1879, during the presidency of Cesáreo Guillermo, at the request of Froilana Febles, Santana's remains were exhumed and transferred to the Regina Angelorum Church. In 1890, they were moved to the bell tower of the Cathedral by order of Archbishop Meriño. In March 1931, during the presidency of Rafael Trujillo, they were transferred to El Seibo.

In 1978, his remains were moved to the National Pantheon of the Dominican Republic by president Joaquín Balaguer. Protesters led by the Duartiano Institute have pressured to remove the remains from the Panteón along with others.

== Historiography ==
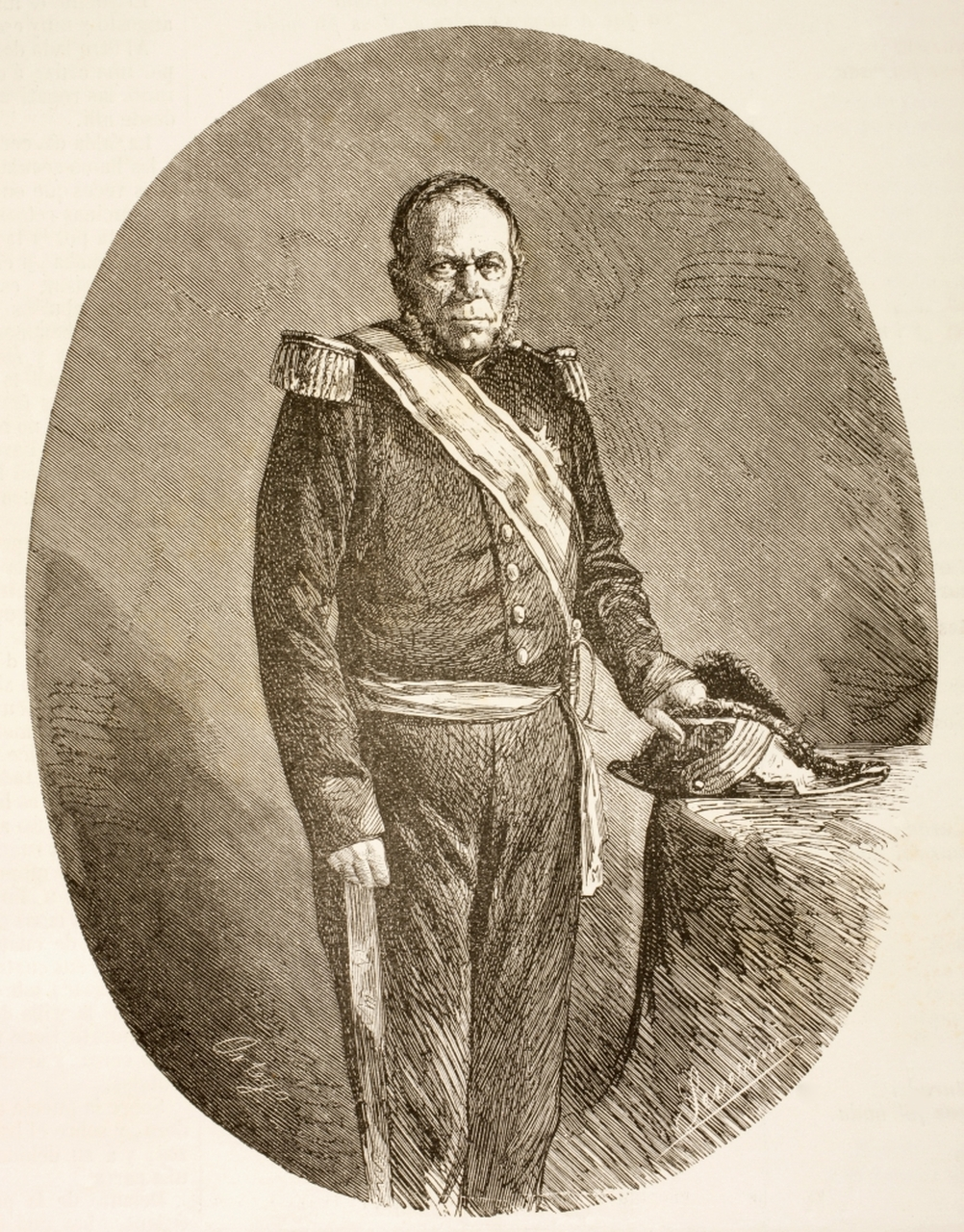
Illustration of Pedro Santana in the magazine El Museo Universal of 1862

He is considered a brilliant military strategist, and was a key figure in the successful separation of the Dominican Republic from Haiti. But many historians, such as Nancie L. González and Howard J. Wiarda, think that some of his later actions barred him from becoming a genuine national hero.

- After he drove the Haitian army out of the country in the Dominican War of Independence, he almost immediately moved to eliminate the very Independentists that fought alongside him. Santana felt that the new nation could not survive without being annexed to Spain, which the Trinitarian Independentists did not accept.
- He relentlessly arrested or exiled members of La Trinitaria. The first person that was forced out of the country was Juan Pablo Duarte, founding father of the new Dominican Republic. He died nobly in Caracas.
- After the campaign of 1849, conflict between Pedro Santana and legendary French-Dominican war hero, General Antonio Duvergé increased. Duvergé was accused of conspiracy against the government of Santana and was executed with his twenty-three year old son, Alcides Duvergé on April 11, 1855. Duvergé was one of the most prominent leaders of the Dominican military, his execution caused ripples around the Dominican community.
- Santana attacked María Trinidad Sánchez, the first heroine of the Republic and aunt of Francisco del Rosario Sánchez of the Founding Fathers of the nation. She and Concepción Bona made the first national flag. Santana imprisoned her, tortured her, and sentenced her to death when she refused to name "conspirators" against him in the newly independent republic. Exactly one year after the proclamation of Independence (February 27, 1845) María Trinidad Sánchez was executed by a firing squad. This made her the first (but not last) female martyr of the republic. 16 years later, in 1861, Francisco del Rosario Sánchez would suffer a similar fate. He entered the nation through Haiti to confront the annexation, but fell into an ambush, instigated by Santana's followers, and was sentenced to death in an illegal military Trial. Sánchez was hailed as the "Hero of El Cercado."

In contemporary times, debated arose in question of his reputation. In 2018, historians and congressmen of the country met to debate whether or not the remains of Pedro Santana should be kept in the National Pantheon. There were ten panelists of what was called the First Forum of the School of History and Anthropology of the Autonomous University of Santo Domingo (UASD): “Santana, outside or inside the National Pantheon?” Only two of them chose to defend the figure of hero attributed to the first president of the Republic. The remaining eight agree in pointing out him as a tyrant who always acted in defense of the conservative groups he represented. “He was not a traitor because he was not a patriot,” said the historian and director of the General Archive of the Nation, Roberto Cassá.

Also historian and professor José Vásquez emphasized the phrase by indicating that Santana “is not a traitor because he never believed in independence.” In fact, he never used that word, but rather he spoke of separation.” Both are in favor of Santana's remains being removed from the National Pantheon, so that they are next to those of the same people he killed. The first to speak was Senator Dionis Sánchez, proponent of a bill that is being considered in the National Congress so that the remains leave the National Pantheon. In addition to citing the events that occurred on March 19, 1844, which earned Santana fame, the legislator also recalled decrees 2140 of 1972 and 1383 of 1975, with which the then government of Joaquín Balaguer ordered the transfer of the remains of Santana from El Seibo to the National Pantheon, an event that took place on February 27, 1976. "Pedro Santana was a son of his time, he committed crimes and carried out persecutions and betrayed more than one, he was relentless, brutal and atrocious, but there is no doubt that his actions in defense of the country in such critical moments were transcendental."

Álvaro Caamaño, with a similar position, recalled that the three-time president of the country was not the only one who fought in the Battle of Azua, and that he always acted with a wrong vision of what the Republic was. He questioned the military glory and the idea of an invincible figure attributed to him, which he described as a myth. While the historian Cassá elaborated on the fact that Santana enjoyed a historical mystification, a “sort of extraordinary blundering falsification” that began from his dictatorial administration and contributed to the annexation of 1861. He considers that the invincibility of the character is not necessary and that it is nothing more than a myth constructed by a political current. He believes that the claim made by Balaguer was due to a strategy of political legalization of the chain of autocrats who have governed the country and of which the reformist leader was a part.

Teachers Henry Cuello and Manuel Otilio Pérez spoke in favor of Santana. The first insisted on the need to study the character based on the events that surrounded his life, while the second highlighted his military glory and questioned the biased data given on the subject. He recalled that during the Battle of Las Carreras, Santana was called from “emerging to score a lost game and won it.” That is why he defends that his remains remain in the National Pantheon.

== Marriages and modern relatives ==
Santana was engaged to María del Carmen Ruiz, who died when she was thrown off her horse as she was returning to El Seibo from a pilgrimage to the sanctuary of Our Lady of Altagracia in Higüey. The death of his fiancée put Santana into deep depression. Santana then married Micaela Antonia del Rivero, a widow and the mother of his brother Ramón's fiancée, Froilana Febles. This made Froilana Febles Pedro Santana's sister-in-law and stepdaughter at the same time, while Micaela del Rivero became sister-in-law and mother-in-law of Ramón Santana. The Santana-del Rivero marriage was unhappy, but it gave Santana influence and power in the southeastern region.

After the death of his wife on December 12, 1854, Santana married Ana Zorrilla, another older, wealthy widow. They had no children.

By Ramón Santana's marriage to Froilana Febles, Pedro Santana had 3 nephews: Manuel (b. 24 March 1833), Francisco, and Rafael Santana (b. 1834-5), and a niece, María de Los Ángeles Santana (b. 1844), who inherited many of Santana's properties.

Among Rafael Santana and his wife Paula Bobadilla's descendants are Cardinal Octavio Beras Rojas and comedian Freddy Beras-Goico. Actress Gaby Desangles is the 3rd-great-granddaughter of Rafael Santana and 4th-great-grandniece of Pedro Santana.

Descendants of his niece, María de los Ángeles Santana Febles, and her husband Isidoro Durán include Minister and former senator José Ignacio Paliza, diplomat Patricia Villegas, and congressman Orlando Jorge Villegas.

== Legacy and honors ==
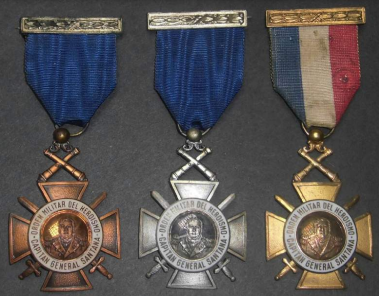
Medals of the Order of Heroism Captain General Santana

On August 24, 1954, during the presidency of Héctor Trujillo, the Law 3915 created the Order of Heroism Captain General Santana.

In 1963, the Fortaleza México de San Pedro de Macorís was renamed Fortaleza General Pedro Santana.

In the province of Elías Piña, the town of Pedro Santana is named after him.

In August 1861, Santana offered the Sword of the Liberator that had been given to him by the Dominican Republic, to the captain-general of Cuba Francisco Serrano. Serrano refused to accept the sword in life of Santana, but agreed to do so after his death. Thus upon Santana's death in 1864, the Sword passed to Serrano as written in Santana's will. In February 1865, colonel José María Velasco gave the Sword to Serrano in Madrid, who gave it to queen Isabella II in March 8, and placed it on the Royal Armory as a memory of the annexation of Santo Domingo.

On October 17, 1936 after the inauguration of the General Santana and Juan Sánchez Ramírez bridges, Santana's sword was awarded to president Rafael Trujillo by the former archbishop Adolfo Alejandro Nouel. When placing the sword on Trujillo's hands, Nouel said: "I say to you. Hail Father of the Country! Keep this sword so that tomorrow, if necessary - and God forbid - you can defend the homeland of our ancestors."

== Character and personality ==
On June 16, 1861 the magazine El Panorama Universal published the following description of Santana:

The stature of the Hon. Mr. Pedro Santana is what in common terms is called regular. His face reveals a lot of energy and determined resolution, and his forehead, shaded with hair, is not bulky. His eyebrows are thick and cover a pair of piercing eyes, which spark fire when his passions are irritated. He has a face, but does not wear a mustache, and in his dress he shows a lot of simplicity. He is sweet and gentlemanly, but very cautious in conversation. He listens and weighs his words well before giving an affirmation; but when he is upset or encouraged, he speaks in the strong dialect of his province with rough intonation, without, however, losing control over himself. This remarkable man is in his house entirely moderate and an enemy of ostentation. His serious demeanor could make foreigners believe that he is austere. He has unlimited authority and prestige over his soldiers. He wins their affection by insinuating manners, and commands their respect with the air of authority with which nature has endowed him.

Brigadier Antonio Peláez de Campomanes, who visited him in 1860, said of him:

With the courage of a lion he brings together a noble and generous heart, as can be certified by the many orphans and helpless whom he has welcomed into his home, and later established. His honesty is foolproof... "

In the early 1860s the American W. S. Courtney described him in the following way:

Pedro Santana, is the current President, he is a man of about sixty years of age, a Spaniard who has traits of the native Indian, a native of the island, a man of great integrity of character and without a doubt usually honest and sincere. He is a shrewd man, and although he does not have much intellectual baggage, he possesses a good sense of appreciation and much administrative ability. He is always cold and circumspect and very popular with the masses and the old Spanish inhabitants of the island. Although he is not a man of great stature, he is of robust and healthy build and bears a striking resemblance to the late General Zachary Taylor.

Gregorio Luperón, his opponent in the Dominican Restoration War, wrote in the 19th-century:

As a moral and honest man, no one has been able to be more so than General Santana in his country. As a soldier he had, from the first day of his career, wonderful penetration, great insight, admirable fortitude, gallant courage and extraordinary energy.

He was a tactician of notable superiority, with a truly organizing spirit, a lover of discipline, with peculiar expertise, great serenity and tireless activity. He was austere, honest, sincere and passionate about order to the point of being inexorable. He constituted a kind of model of the great men of the last century, without being able to enter the law among the moderns.

For General Santana, the freedom of the 19th century was the lightning that burned his forehead and tired his spirit. Democracy frightened him like the desert frightened a pilgrim, and liberalism was his horror. He could never lift his spirit above the darkness of his time or follow the advances of civilization. For him true politics consisted in autocracy, and despotism was his scepter. In it he put all his thoughts, and for its regime he gave his life with true devotion.

He constitutionally governed the nation four times, saving it from the Haitian invasions with great dignity, strength and courage. He founded the army, the navy, probity in the Public Treasury, equity in justice, respect for laws and property; He instilled true morality and honesty in the masses and was the most prestigious and popular leader ever known..

His longtime archrival Juan Pablo Duarte dedicated a poem to Santana.

== Ancestry ==
¿? Santana
Pedro Santana
¿?
Pedro Santana Familias
Santiago Familias
Petronila Familias Carrasco
María Carrasco

== See also ==
- Dominican War of Independence
- Dominican Restoration War
- Spanish annexation of the Dominican Republic
- Queen Isabella II
- José de la Gándara y Navarro
- Juan Pablo Duarte
- Juan Sánchez Ramírez
- List of colonial governors of Santo Domingo

== Bibliography ==
- Balcácer, Juan Daniel. Pedro Santana: Historia política de un déspota. Santo Domingo, 1974.
- Martínez, Rufino. Santana y Báez, Santiago, 1943.
- Martínez, Rufino. Diccionario biográfico-histórico dominicano, 1821-1930. Santo Domingo, 1998.
- Molina Morillo, Rafael. Gloria y repudio. México, 1959.
- Rodríguez Demorizi, Emilio. Papeles del general Santana. Roma, 1952.

=== Additional Bibliography ===
- Emilio Rodríguez Demorizi, General Pedro Santana (1982).
- Cassá, Roberto. Pedro Santana: Autocrat and annexationist. Santo Domingo: Tobogan, 2000.

Government offices
Preceded by Francisco del Rosario Sánchez	President of the Central Government Junta; 1844–1848	Succeeded by Manuel Jimenes
Preceded by Manuel Jimenes	President of the Dominican Republic; 1849	Succeeded by Buenaventura Báez
Preceded by Buenaventura Báez	President of the Dominican Republic; 1853–1856	Succeeded by Manuel de Regla Mota
Preceded by José Desiderio Valverde	President of the Dominican Republic; 1858–1861	Succeeded by Himself as Governor of Santo Domingo
Vacant Title restored Title last held by Pascual Real	Governor and Captain-General of Santo Domingo; 1861–1862	Succeeded by Felipe Ribero y Lemoine
Spanish nobility
New title	Marquess of Las Carreras; 16 June 1862 – 28 March 1864	Title extinct
