= Timeline of Santo Domingo =

Coordinates: 18.466667°N 69.95°W

The following is a timeline of the history of the city of Santo Domingo in the Dominican Republic.

== 15th century ==
- 1492- First Viceroyalty in the New World is established in Santo Domingo (Viceroyalty of the Indies)
- 1496 - Spanish colony of Santo Domingo, first permanent settlement in the New World, is established.
- 1498- The city of Santo Domingo is founded by Bartholomew Columbus, brother of Christopher Columbus

== 16th century ==
- 1502- Calle Las Damas, first street in the New World, is constructed
- 1502- Santo Domingo becomes the home of all the future conquistadors (Hernán Cortés, Francisco Pizarro, Vasco Núñez de Balboa, Alonso de Ojeda, Pedro Menéndez de Avilés, Diego Velázquez de Cuéllar, Juan Ponce de León, Rodrigo de Bastidas, Pedro de Alvarado, Lucas Vázquez de Ayllón, among others)
- 1502- Santo Domingo becomes the official headquarters for the exploration and conquest of the New World
- 1502- Monastery of San Francisco, first monastery in America, is built.
- 1503- Casa de Contratacion is created in Sevilla to regulate trade with the Americas
- 1503- Hospital San Nicolás de Bari, first hospital in the Americas, begins construction.
- 1505 - Fortaleza Ozama, first fortress in the Americas, is built.
- 1509- Reales Atarazanas, first warehouse complex in the New World, is built
- 1510- Church of the Convent of the Dominican Order, first church in the New World, is built
- 1511
  - Roman Catholic diocese of Santo Domingo established.
  - Alcázar de Colón (Columbus Alcazar), first castle or viceroyal residence in the Americas, is built
  - The Royal Audiencia of Santo Domingo, first court in the New World, is established
- 1513- Laws of Burgos are passed concerning the treatment of the indigenous people.
- 1514 - Maria de Toledo, serve as regent of the colony during the absence of her spouse the governor until 1520.
- 1522- Jean Fleury commits the first recorded attack of piracy against Spanish ships
- 1538 - Universidad de Santo Tomas de Aquino, first university in the New World, is founded.
- 1540 - Cathedral Primate of the Americas, first cathedral in the Americas, is built.
- 1543 - Fort San Genaro, today La Puerta del Conde (The Count's Gate), construction begins.
- 1574- Francisco Tostado de la Peña, Elvira de Mendoza and Leonor de Ovando write the first sonnets in the New World
- 1586- Francis Drake captures Santo Domingo in the Battle of Santo Domingo
- 1588- Cristobal de Llerena writes the first theatrical play in the New World
- 1600- After the gold mines were exhausted most colonists had decided to become conquistadors and explorers and had left for the mines of Mexico and Peru. Others decide to settle and become hateros (herders), farmers and merchants.

== 17th century ==
- 1602- Colony of Santo Domingo is bypassed by immigrants from Spain and enters decline due to depopulation
- 1605- Devastations of Osorio take place in the North Coast to prevent illicit trade with colonies other than Spain
- 1620- The Brotherhood of the Coast is formed by pirates in the Tortuga island
- 1630- The fight against the buccaneers and filibusters begins (Piracy in the Caribbean)
- 1654- Capture of Fort Rocher- The Spaniards capture the Tortuga Island from the French for the 4th and last time.
- 1655- English invasion of Penn and Venables is defeated by the criollos
- 1691- Battle of Sabana Real is won against the French
- 1697 - Island of Hispaniola divided into Spanish Santo Domingo and French Saint-Domingue (Haiti) per Treaty of Ryswick that settled the Nine Years' War.

== 18th century ==
- 1716 - Privateers corsairs from the colony of Santo Domingo take action during the Golden Age of Piracy
- 1724 - Guadalupe and Tolosa Shipwreck in Samana
- 1741 - Battle of Cartagena de Indias- Santo Domingo participates in the Spanish victory against the English Navy
- 1760 - Population is bolstered by immigration from the Canary Islands resettling the northern part of the island. Population grows from 6,000 to 125,000 by 1790.
- 1775 - Saint-Domingue becomes one of the richest colonies in the world in the 18th-century French empire
- 1791 - Haitian Revolution takes place in Saint-Domingue
- 1795 - Era de Francia begins after the Treaty of Basel where Spain ceded the eastern two-thirds of the island of Hispaniola to France in exchange for keeping Gipuzkoa, ending the War of the Pyrenees.
- 1796 - Massive emigration of the colonial families to Cuba, Venezuela, Puerto Rico and Mexico where they become cultural pioneers and intellectual figures Famous figures and descendants of the Treaty of Basel diaspora include Jose Maria Heredia, Severiano de Heredia, Jose-Maria de Heredia Girard, Domingo del Monte, Esteban Pichardo, Francisco Javier Caro, Angulo Guridi brothers, Jacobo de Villaurrutia, Juan Vicente Moscoso, Manuel Márquez Sterling, Rafael Maria Baralt, Arístides Rojas Espaillat, Francisco Javier Foxa, Emilio Portes Gil, Antonio Melendez Bazan, Pedro Agustin Morel de Santa Cruz, Antonio del Monte y Tejada, Andres Lopez Medrano, Ramon Emeterio Betances, Raimundo Rendon Sarmiento, Eugenio Maria de Hostos, Máximo Gómez, Antonio Maceo, among others.
- 1797 - The University of Santo Tomas de Aquino closes which, along with the emigration of the intellectual class, causes a big "brain drain"

== 19th century ==
- 1808- Battle of Palo Hincado. Criollos from the Island beat the French Napoleonic troops and make Santo Domingo a Spanish colony again.
- 1809 - 2nd Spanish colony or España Boba ("Meek Spain") after La Reconquista takes place.
- 1821- Ephemeral Independence from Spain takes place
- 1822 - Unification of the island. Haitians in power. Further emigration takes place
- 1838- La Trinitaria is created
- 1844- Dominican War of Separation from Haiti starts
- February: La Trinitaria take Ozama Fortress.
- July: Pedro Santana in power.
- City becomes capital of newly independent Dominican Republic
- 1845- El Dominicano, first political newspaper, begins circulation
- 1854- First cultural society "Los Amantes de las Letras" ("Lovers of the Letters") is created
- 1854- First cultural newspapers El Progreso and El Oasis appear
- 1860- First Dominican theater is established by society "Los Amantes de las Letras"
- 1861 - 3rd Spanish Colony begins to prevent further Haitian occupation. Spanish in power again.
- 1862- First printing press company, Garcia Hermanos, is established
- 1863- Dominican Restoration War begins
- 1865- Second Republic begins
- 1866- The University Instituto Profesional (later University of Santo Domingo) is established
- 1875- Sugar mills emerge and urban development takes place
- 1889 - Listín Diario newspaper begins publication.

== 20th century ==
- 1907 - Licey baseball club formed.
- 1914 - El Placer de los Estudios built.
- 1916 - United States occupation of the Dominican Republic begins.
- 1921 - Escogido baseball club formed.
- 1924 - United States occupation of the Dominican Republic ends.
- 1930 - September: Hurricane San Zenon.
- 1930- Era of Trujillo begins
- 1935 - Population: 71,297.
- 1936
  - City renamed "Trujillo City".
  - Colombina avenue built.
- 1938 - Breakwater built in harbour.
- 1941 - La Jaragua hotel built.
- 1942 - National School of Fine Arts and Teatro Olimpia (cinema) open.
- 1944 - National Palace built.
- 1948 - El Caribe newspaper in publication.
- 1950 - Population: 181,553.
- 1953 - Base Aérea Trujillo (airbase) in operation near city.
- 1955
  - December: Fair of Peace and Fraternity of the Free World opens.
  - Estadio Quisqueya (baseball stadium) opens.
- 1956 - National Pantheon of the Dominican Republic (mausoleum) established.
- 1961 - May 30: Trujillo assassinated near city.
- 1961- November 19: Rebellion of the Pilots. Trujillo family flees the country
- 1965
  - April 24: Dominican Civil War
  - April 28: United States occupation of the Dominican Republic begins.
- 1966
  - July 1: United States occupation of the Dominican Republic ends.
  - El Nacional newspaper begins publication.
- 1970 - Population: 673,470 city; 817,645 urban agglomeration.
- 1972 - Santo Domingo Institute of Technology founded.
- 1973 - Museo de las Casas Reales (museum) established.
- 1974
  - City hosts 1974 Central American and Caribbean Games.
  - Estadio Olímpico Félix Sánchez, Palacio de los Deportes Virgilio Travieso Soto, and Centro Olímpico Juan Pablo Duarte (sports venues) open.
- 1976 - Moscoso National Botanical Garden founded.
- 1979 - August: Hurricane David.
- 1986 - Latin American Social Sciences Institute established in city.
- 1992- Faro a Colon (The Columbus Lighthouse) is erected in honor of the 500th anniversary of the Discovery of the Americas
- 1993 - Population: 2,134,779.
- 1997 - Internet exchange point installed.
- 1998
  - Autodrómo Internacional de Las Américas opens near city.
  - Johnny Ventura becomes mayor.
- 1999 - Museo Bellapart founded.

== 21st century ==
- 2001 - November 12: Crash in New York of Santo Domingo-bound airplane.
- 2002 - Roberto Salcedo becomes mayor.
- 2003
  - August: City hosts 2003 Pan American Games.
  - Malecon towers built.
- 2009 - Santo Domingo Metro begins operating.
- 2010 - Population: 965,040; metro 2,907,100.
- 2025 - The Jet Set nightclub roof collapses, killing at least 221 people and injuring 255.

== See also ==
- Santo Domingo history
- Ciudad Colonial (Santo Domingo)
- History of the Dominican Republic

== Bibliography ==
- Hazard, Samuel (1873). Santo Domingo: Past and Present, with a Glance at Hayti. New York: Harper & Brothers. p. 228.
- Nathan Appleton (1891). "Santo Domingo City". Journal of the American Geographical Society of New York. 23. hdl:2027/uc1.$b692729.
- David Marley (2005), "Dominican Republic: Santo Domingo", Historic Cities of the Americas, vol. 1, Santa Barbara, California: ABC-CLIO, pp. 91–106, ISBN 1-57607-027-1
- Jesse Hoffnung-Garskof (2008). A Tale of Two Cities: Santo Domingo and New York After 1950. Princeton University Press. ISBN 978-0-691-12338-7.
- Marcos Barinas Uribe (2010). "Setting the City in Motion: Urban Landscape and Modernity in Santo Domingo". Caribbean Modernist Architecture. Archivos de Arquitectura Antillana. UTech Jamaica and Museum of Modern Art. ISBN 978-0-87070-775-9.
