= Declaration of Independence of the Dominican People (1821) =

1821 document that declared Dominican independence

- Created: December 1, 1821
- Location: General Archive of the Indies
- Author: José Núñez de Cáceres
- Signatories: 8
- Media type: Declaration of Independence
- Purpose: Declare the independence of Republic of Spanish Haiti from Spain

The Declaration of Independence of the Dominican People (1821) (Spanish: Declaratoria de Independencia del Pueblo Dominicano de 1821) was a declaration of Independence that was proclaimed on December 1, 1821 by José Núñez de Cáceres, following the overthrow of Spanish rule in Santo Domingo. This marked the start of the short-lived period known as the Ephemeral Independence and established the Independent State of Spanish Haiti.

== History ==
On December 1, 1821, a group of conspirators led a revolt against the ruling Spanish government in Santo Domingo. With the capitulation of the Spanish, the leader of the revolt, José Núñez de Cáceres, made public his declaration of independence. In his first words, he proclaimed the end of Spanish rule in Santo Domingo:

“No more dependence, no more humiliation, no more submission to the whim and fickleness of the Madrid Cabinet,” he said, and maintained that in these brief and concise clauses is encoded the firm resolution that the Dominican people swear and proclaim on this day. From this moment on, they have broken forever the worn links that chained them to the heavy and oppressive cart of the Old Metropolis, and, resuming the dignity and energy of a free people, they protest before the Supreme Being that, resolved to become an Independent State, there will be no sacrifice that they will not sacrifice on the altar of the Fatherland to carry out the heroic enterprise of appearing and being admitted to the rank and consideration of the other free peoples of the political world.”

In the declaration, he continued to highlight the 328 years of grievances endured since the discovery of the island in 1492. He went on to proclaim that “the Spanish part of the Republic of Haiti is hereby constituted as a free and independent State: that the good Dominican people, neither now nor henceforth nor ever, will be subject to the laws and Government of Spain, considering themselves absolved of all obligation of fidelity and obedience: that, invested with the dignity and character of a sovereign nation, they have full power and faculties to establish the form of Government that best suits them, enter into alliances, declare war, conclude peace, adjust trade treaties, and enter into other acts, transactions and agreements that other free and independent peoples may by right.”

Núñez de Cáceres made it clear that if Spain recognized and approved the declaration of independence, “it will be considered and considered a friend, but if it challenges it or in any way attempts to hinder our institutions and the progress of the new government “in which we are going to enter, we will know how to defend it with our lives, fortune, and honor. Long live the Homeland, Long live Independence, Long live the Union of Colombia.” In addition, Nunez de Caceres issues a warning, perhaps alluding to pro-Spanish factions within the population:

If there are still among us souls so low and sold to servility, that they dare to contradict these truths of experience, let them turn their fascinated eyes for a moment to the frightful state of ruin and desolation in which the Spanish part of the Primate of the New World lies submerged.

Ironically, Núñez de Cáceres himself proclaimed independence under the protectorate of Gran Colombia, but he did not get the support from Simón Bolívar, who simply refused to acknowledge him.

== Signatories ==
The document was recorded to have had 8 signatories:

- José Núñez de Cáceres
- Manuel Carvajal
- Juan Vicente Moscoso
- Antonio Martinez Valdés
- Juan Nepomuceno de Arredondo
- Juan Ruiz
- Vicente Mancebo
- Manuel Lopez de Umeres

== Aftermath ==
In the midst of the conspiracy, however, there was growing advocacy among the population for the unification of the territory with neighboring Haiti. The movement was encouraged by the Haitian President Jean Pierre Boyer, who responded by entering the country with a large army some several months later in February 1822. With local support waning for the project, and still no response from Gran Colombia, Núñez de Cáceres was forced to abandon his plans entirely and concede to the Haitians, thus initiating the Haitian occupation of Santo Domingo.

== See also ==
- España Boba
- Republic of Spanish Haiti
- José Núñez de Cáceres
