= SS Ozama =

SS Ozama is the name of the following ships:

- SS Ozama (1881), wrecked 23 November 1894
- SS Ozama (1916), commissioned as USS Ozama 1917–1919

== See also ==
- Ozama (disambiguation)
