= Ozama =

Ozama may refer to:

- Ozama, one of the geographic regions of the Dominican Republic
  - Ozama Department, former Department of Hispaniola encompassing part of that region
- Ozama River, Dominican Republic
- Fortaleza Ozama (Ozama Fortress), at the entrance to Santo Domingo's Ciudad Colonial, Dominican Republic
- USS Ozama (1916), a US Navy naval mine carrier
- SS Ozama (1881), a steamer

== See also ==
- Osama (disambiguation)
