= ISO 3166-2:DO =

Entry for the Dominican Republic in ISO 3166-2

ISO 3166-2:DO is the entry for the Dominican Republic in ISO 3166-2, part of the ISO 3166 standard published by the International Organization for Standardization (ISO), which defines codes for the names of the principal subdivisions (e.g., provinces or states) of all countries coded in ISO 3166-1.

Currently for the Dominican Republic, ISO 3166-2 codes are defined for ten regions, 31 provinces and one district. The Distrito Nacional contains the capital of the country Santo Domingo and has special status equal to the provinces.

Each code consists of two parts, separated by a hyphen. The first part is DO, the ISO 3166-1 alpha-2 code of the Dominican Republic. The second part is two digits:

- 01: district
- 02–27: provinces as of late 1970s
- 28–30: provinces created in the 1980s and 1990s
- 31–32: provinces created in 2001 and 2002
- 33–42: regions

== Current codes ==
Subdivision names are listed as in the ISO 3166-2 standard published by the ISO 3166 Maintenance Agency (ISO 3166/MA).

Click on the button in the header to sort each column.

=== Regions ===
Code	Subdivision name (es)	Subdivision name (en) (Note: For reference only, English name not included in the ISO 3166-2 standard.)
DO-33	Cibao Nordeste	Northeast Cibao
DO-34	Cibao Noroeste	Northwest Cibao
DO-35	Cibao Norte	North Cibao
DO-36	Cibao Sur	South Cibao
DO-37	El Valle	The Valley
DO-38	Enriquillo	Enriquillo
DO-39	Higuamo	Higuamo
DO-40	Ozama	Ozama
DO-41	Valdesia	Valdesia
DO-42	Yuma	Yuma

=== Provinces and district ===
Code	Subdivision name (es)	Subdivision name (en)	Subdivision category	Parent subdivision
DO-02	Azua	Azua	province	DO-41
DO-03	Baoruco	Baoruco	province	DO-38
DO-04	Barahona	Barahona	province	DO-38
DO-05	Dajabón	Dajabon	province	DO-34
DO-01	Distrito Nacional (Santo Domingo)	Santo Domingo City	district	DO-40
DO-06	Duarte	Duarte	province	DO-33
DO-08	El Seibo	El Seibo	province	DO-42
DO-07	Elías Piña	Elias Pina	province	DO-37
DO-09	Espaillat	Espaillat	province	DO-35
DO-30	Hato Mayor	Great Herd	province	DO-39
DO-19	Hermanas Mirabal	Mirabal Sisters	province	DO-33
DO-10	Independencia	Independence	province	DO-38
DO-11	La Altagracia	La Altagracia	province	DO-42
DO-12	La Romana	La Romana	province	DO-42
DO-13	La Vega	La Vega	province	DO-36
DO-14	María Trinidad Sánchez	Maria Trinidad Sanchez	province	DO-33
DO-28	Monseñor Nouel	Monsignor Nouel	province	DO-36
DO-15	Monte Cristi	Christ Mountain	province	DO-34
DO-29	Monte Plata	Silver Mountain	province	DO-39
DO-16	Pedernales	Pedernales	province	DO-38
DO-17	Peravia	Peravia	province	DO-41
DO-18	Puerto Plata	Silver Port	province	DO-35
DO-20	Samaná	Samana	province	DO-33
DO-21	San Cristóbal	Saint Christopher	province	DO-41
DO-31	San José de Ocoa	Saint Joseph	province	DO-41
DO-22	San Juan	Saint John	province	DO-37
DO-23	San Pedro de Macorís	Saint Peter	province	DO-39
DO-24	Sánchez Ramírez	Sanchez Ramirez	province	DO-36
DO-25	Santiago	Santiago	province	DO-35
DO-26	Santiago Rodríguez	Santiago Rodriguez	province	DO-34
DO-32	Santo Domingo	Santo Domingo	province	DO-40
DO-27	Valverde	Valverde	province	DO-34

== Changes ==
The following changes to the entry have been announced in newsletters by the ISO 3166/MA since the first publication of ISO 3166-2 in 1998. ISO stopped issuing newsletters in 2013.

Edition/Newsletter	Date issued	Description of change in newsletter	Code/Subdivision change
Newsletter I-1	2000-06-21	Introduction of new subdivision code elements taken from the Dominican Statistics Code. Correction of alphabetic sorting of subdivision names. Addition of 1 alternative name form	Codes: format changed (see below)
ISO 3166-2:2007	2007-12-13	Second edition of ISO 3166-2 (this change was not announced in a newsletter)	Subdivisions added: DO-31 San José de Ocoa; DO-32 Santo Domingo

The following changes to the entry are listed on ISO's online catalogue, the Online Browsing Platform:

Effective date of change	Short description of change (en)
2014-12-18	Assign parent subdivision to DO-01
2014-10-29	Add región (region) as top-level of subdivisions; add 10 regions DO-33 to DO-42; change subdivision name of DO-03, DO-08 and DO-19; update List Source

=== Codes changed in Newsletter I-1 ===
Note: Two provinces were assigned the code DO-EP.

Before	After	Subdivision name
DO-DN	DO-01	Distrito Nacional (Santo Domingo)
DO-AZ	DO-02	Azua
DO-BR	DO-03	Bahoruco
DO-BH	DO-04	Barahona
DO-DA	DO-05	Dajabón
DO-DU	DO-06	Duarte
DO-SE	DO-08	El Seybo [El Seibo]
DO-EP	DO-09	Espaillat
DO-HM	DO-30	Hato Mayor
DO-IN	DO-10	Independencia
DO-AL	DO-11	La Altagracia
DO-EP	DO-07	La Estrelleta [Elías Piña]
DO-RO	DO-12	La Romana
DO-VE	DO-13	La Vega
DO-MT	DO-14	María Trinidad Sánchez
DO-MN	DO-28	Monseñor Nouel
DO-MC	DO-15	Monte Cristi
DO-MP	DO-29	Monte Plata
DO-PN	DO-16	Pedernales
DO-PR	DO-17	Peravia
DO-PP	DO-18	Puerto Plata
DO-SC	DO-19	Salcedo
DO-SM	DO-20	Samaná
DO-CR	DO-21	San Cristóbal
DO-JU	DO-22	San Juan
DO-PM	DO-23	San Pedro de Macorís
DO-SZ	DO-24	Sánchez Ramírez
DO-ST	DO-25	Santiago
DO-SR	DO-26	Santiago Rodríguez
DO-VA	DO-27	Valverde

== See also ==
- Geographic regions of the Dominican Republic
- Subdivisions of the Dominican Republic
- FIPS region codes of the Dominican Republic
- Neighbouring country: HT
