= José Núñez de Cáceres =

Early Dominican independence leader; 1st and only president of Spanish Haiti (1821–22)

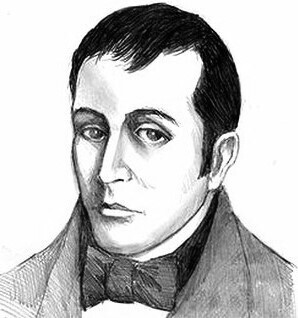

President of the Republic of Spanish Haiti
- In office December 1, 1821 – February 9, 1822

Personal details
- Born: March 14, 1772 Santo Domingo, Captaincy General of Santo Domingo (now Dominican Republic)
- Died: September 11, 1846 (aged 74) Ciudad Victoria, Tamaulipas, Mexico
- Spouse: Juana de Mata Madrigal Cordero
- Children: Pedro, José, Francisco de Asis, Gerónimo, Gregorio, and Maria de la Merced
- Profession: Politician and writer

José Núñez de Cáceres y Albor (March 14, 1772 – September 11, 1846) was a Dominican revolutionary and writer. Known for being the leader of the first Dominican independence movement against Spain in 1821, his actions preceded the Dominican War of Independence.

Before its independence, while Spain exercised a perfunctory rule over the east side of Hispaniola, Núñez de Cáceres pioneered the use of literature as a weapon for social protest and anti-colonial politics. He was also the first Dominican fabulist and one of the first criollo storytellers in Spanish America. Many of his works appeared in his own satirical newspaper, El Duende, the second newspaper created in Santo Domingo. He was only president of the short-lived Republic of Spanish Haiti, which existed from December 1, 1821, to February 9, 1822. This period was known as the ephemeral independence because it quickly ended with the Haitian Military Occupation of Santo Domingo.

== Early years ==
José Núñez de Cáceres Albor was born on March 14, 1772, in the capital city of Santo Domingo. He was the son of 2nd Lt. Francisco Núñez de Cáceres and María Albor Polanco. His mother died a few days after his birth. He had two older brothers: Pedro and Gerónimo. He was raised by his aunt María Núñez de Cáceres. A pious woman, she transmitted the moral values of Catholicism and interest in culture. She, in the very least, ensured that he attended one of the few schools that operated with a subsidy from the City Council. From an early age he developed a desire for knowledge, despite the poverty in which the colony of Santo Domingo was mired. This love of culture was not to the liking of his father, who wanted his son to accompany him in manual labor in the fields, and although he had the means to support him in his studies, he was hostile to his son's aspiration, which forced him to lead a poor life and to have to find resources for survival, finding himself at the extreme of selling pigeons on the streets.

As a result of this situation, at one point Núñez de Cáceres had to accept the pressures of his father and abandon his training in order to integrate into the routine of agricultural work. This experience inspired in him an aversion towards anything that involved life outside the urban environment and He confirmed his vocation for study. Historian José Gabriel García narrates that, while he remained with his father, he took advantage of every moment that came his way to dedicate himself to reading and analyzing scientific treatises. In the dull debate between one and the other, the character of someone who had set out as a life goal to become a man of letters ended up winning. Finally the young man returned to the home of his aunt, who continued to serve as adoptive mother. She arranged for him to be admitted to the University of Saint Thomas Aquinas, of the Dominican Order, where he studied law. On campus he stood out as an exceptional student, to the extent that the teachers gave him the most difficult cases to solve. In particular, he showed signs of eloquence that attracted attention and put him above some of his teachers. García characterized his gifts: “Eloquent without affectation, quick in his conceptions, precise in the choice of terms, strong in argument and impetuous in attack, his speeches brought together the pomp that enchanted, the logic that persuades and the brilliance that fascinates.” This ability in oratory was not unrelated to his interest in literature, although it is not known that in those years he wrote poetic compositions.

== España Boba ==
His performance was so fruitful that shortly after graduating with a law degree he was incorporated into the University's teaching staff, possibly being the youngest professor at that time. His activities focused on the practice of law, a field in which he also began to shine. He showed scrupulous honesty and a vocation for service that led him not to accept fees from his clients of poor condition. His ability was recognized by the Royal Court, which proposed him the position of rapporteur. But at that time the Treaty of Basel took place, which ceded the country to France, and the governing body paralyzed its initiatives in order to prepare its transfer to Cuba, which occurred in 1799. Together with other Dominican lawyers, Núñez de Cáceres marched towards Puerto Príncipe (current Camagüey), city where the Royal Court was temporarily reorganized. When a competition was called for the position of rapporteur, he obtained it without difficulty, in recognition of his legal training. In addition to efficient performance in the exercise of office and in the profession of lawyer, Núñez de Cáceres was recognized for his marked spirit of probity, earning him the esteem of the city's residents. Apparently he made a certain amount of money through his professional work. More than anything, he took advantage of his years in Cuba to deepen his cultural training, and became one of the most prestigious men in the environment that welcomed him. It was there, in August 1800, that Núñez de Cáceres was appointed to the office of Rapporteur, although he was able to continue practicing law.

Núñez de Cáceres had a career as a Spanish civil servant in Cuba assured, but he decided to do without that rosy future as soon as he learned that Santo Domingo had been reincorporated into Spain in 1808. Like so many other emigrants, he returned to his city. He arrived surrounded by the aura of a competent lawyer, with almost 10 years of experience in the administration in Cuba. He was also favored by the royal commissioner, Francisco Javier Caro, in charge of the institutional reorganization of the country, with whom he was united by an old friendship. Thanks to personal relationships and his ability, he obtained the position of War auditor, the second most important position within the colonial administration.

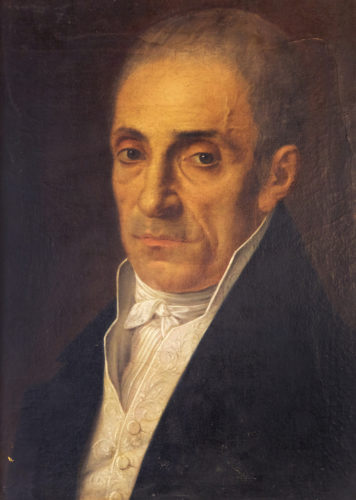
As a young man, Núñez de Cáceres had already occupied several positions in the restored Spanish government in Santo Domingo under his former boss, Juan Sánchez Ramírez.

From very early on in his new role, he became an essential part of the administrative train. Without a doubt, he was the most competent official and, to a large extent, many of the guidelines that the Spanish administration applied in those difficult times were the product of his initiatives. This is explained because he managed to establish cordial relations with Juan Sánchez Ramírez, appointed governor after directing the War of Reconquista in 1808 and 1809. (During his administration, Sánchez Ramírez appointed him to the position of Lieutenant Governor, General Counsel and Government Service Judge Advocate General's Corps of the province of Santo Domingo). The environment was frankly conservative, but Núñez de Cáceres, as far as possible, tried to give liberal orientations to his executions. Although he never lost the trust of Sánchez Ramírez, he gained the animosity of Caro, who had established himself as the representative of the colony's depleted social elite. Sensing the intentions of Núñez de Cáceres, Caro tried to ruin his career, but was unsuccessful because his former protégé was an impossible replacement piece in the administrative apparatus.

After the death of Sánchez Ramírez in 1811, several governors succeeded one another, but Núñez de Cáceres remained the main factor of continuity. Although this did not mean that what he would have aspired to be done, he discreetly tried to limit the excesses of the autocratic environment and protect the country's interests against metropolitan exclusivism. For example, he achieved a change in the customs tariff imposed from the Peninsula that harmed producers and the consuming public. He had the good sense to find solutions to some of the difficulties in which the country was struggling, such as the almost non-existence of currency due to the non-reception of currency that was previously sent from Mexico and the weak amounts of exports, reduced to sporadic items. of tobacco and mahogany. Contrary to the position of Núñez de Cáceres, it was decided to issue paper money, a solution that turned out to be inadequate, so his advice to issue a metallic copper coin was followed. Unlike paper money, copper money did not suffer public repudiation and contributed to boosting internal exchanges and easing the economic depression.

In those years, an unfavorable state of opinion regarding Spain emerged, due to absolutism and the lack of metropolitan attention to the fate of the colony. The Creoles felt left out in the face of the favoritism enjoyed by officials coming from the metropolis and the possessions of the Caribbean. The privilege that was granted to high-born families, who had been in solidarity with French domination, also caused resentment among the former combatants of the Reconquista. Núñez de Cáceres was influenced by this current of opinion and, from his bureaucratic position, he began to operate as a representative of local interests, a supporter of liberal orientations. Historian José Gabriel García collects the version that, shortly after returning, the calamitous state of the colony led him to consider the relevance of the break with Spain, to the point of having dared to suggest to the leader of the Reconquista that he join that position. This may not prove that Núñez de Cáceres, a cautious official, took such a risky step, but it seems certain that his liberal spirit led him to a progressive distance from the metropolis.

== The struggle for independence ==
As War Auditor, he was responsible for ensuring the security of the State, which is why he followed up on the processes initiated against various conspirators, among which those of the Italian Revolution stood out. Tradition relates that he interceded with Governor Sánchez Ramírez so that the penalties were moderate, but his advice was ignored. The truth is that at the time he had to prepare the files, he advocated for severe punishments, which in the case of the four arrested ringleaders were capital punishment. It is certain that Núñez de Cáceres did not share such a terrible decision, but he was forced to accept it as part of his obligations. Tradition also relates that he had frequent disagreements on other matters with the governor, although they did not tarnish the cordiality of their relations.

As part of the assumption of Creole interests, Núñez de Cáceres established links with some of the leaders of the anti-French war and with intellectual figures. Its predominance in the intellectual order moved to the political aspect. At home, during the nights, a gathering was regularly held, in which the need for independence crept in. Núñez de Cáceres was a carrier of this position, although he apparently expressed it carefully. The cultural protagonism that he exercised had its first manifestation in the reopening of the university in 1815. As this provision was a product of his initiative, the faculty elected him rector. Although it did not return to its existing level until 1795, the entity played an important cultural role in the development of a libertarian spirit. From its midst came proposals aimed at the establishment of a liberal regime. The incipient modern intellectuality began to express itself from the professorship, a movement in which, in addition to Núñez de Cáceres, figures such as Andrés López de Medrano and Bernardo Correa y Cidrón took part.

=== Shift in political ideology ===
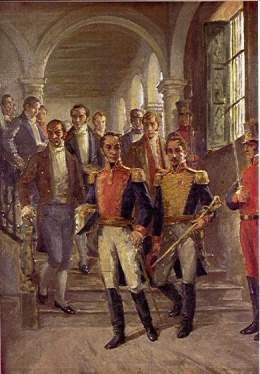
As Spanish rule in Santo Domingo became more unstable, other colonies in Latin America were already in preparation to break away from the Spanish Empire. The wars of independence in South America would have a great influence in Núñez de Cáceres's desire for the independence of Santo Domingo.

In 1812, Núñez de Caceres began to shift his views on the colonial status of the territories in Spanish America. The freedoms guaranteed by the Constitution of 1812 made it easier for Núñez de Cáceres to advance his independence goals. Two circumstances were added that favored them, since they gave rise to a growing loss of credibility in Spain. The first was the administration's inability to overcome the economic crisis that the country had been suffering since the reestablishment of Spanish sovereignty. This state of affairs renewed the agitation due to the advance of the independence troops from South America, led by Simón Bolívar. For years before, the country's coasts were frequented by South American corsairs who dedicated themselves to propagating libertarian ideas among the Dominicans. Other means were presented so that people of cultural level could learn about the motivations that encouraged the Creoles of South America to rebel against the metropolis. This was, for example, what happened in 1817, when a convoy of ships carrying political prisoners to Spain passed through the port of Santo Domingo. Some passengers managed to deliver copies of a work that dealt with the condition of the Spanish colonies and the causes of the emancipation struggle.

There were, however, indications that since mid-1821, precisely while he was editing El Duende, Núñez de Cáceres began to prepare the coup d'état to overthrow Spanish rule. To this end, he expanded the circle of contacts, taking advantage of the impunity that his status as an official in the colonial administration afforded him. But he plotted with great care, since the governor was alert after a denunciation suffered by one of Núñez de Cáceres's associates, Antonio Martínez Valdés, a member of the Provincial Council. The matter had no major significance because the affected person denied the veracity of the complaint and proceeded to subject the informant to judicial persecution. In November 1821, a new factor entered the scene in the crisis that afflicted the Spanish regime. Since the 8th of that month, insurrectional movements broke out in towns near the border, especially Dajabón and Monte Cristi. It is revealing that the leader of one of these rebellions was Diego Polanco, one of the leaders of the War of Reconquista and signatory of the minutes of the Junta of Bondillo.

The insurrections were intended to integrate Santo Domingo into the territory of neighboring Haiti, an objective that became viable due to the collapse of the monarchy of King Henri Christophe at the end of 1820. Jean Pierre Boyer, who in 1818 had replaced Alexandre Pétion as president of the southern republic, rushed to unify Haiti and, almost immediately, conceived the purpose of implementing the constitutional clause that stipulated that Haitian territory was limited by the island. For this purpose, Boyer assigned several agents to the border areas, such as Desir Dalmasí, a major in the Haitian army, who claimed to carry out commercial transactions in livestock to spread the objective of union with Haiti. Governor Sebastián Kindelán y O'Regan protested and was apparently convinced by the assurances that Boyer offered him. In any case, what was at stake was the impotence of the Spanish colonial authority of Santo Domingo in the face of the advance of the assimilationist purposes of the mulatto ruling class of Haiti, since it lacked sufficient troops to stage an armed confrontation with the neighboring country and it was out of the question to receive support from the peninsula or the nearby colonies due to the war of independence that was being fought in South America.

As he strengthened his internal power, Boyer expanded the devices aimed at achieving the incorporation of Santo Domingo, which for the Haitian leaders was nothing more than the Partie de l'Est (eastern part). He took advantage of the deepening discredit of the Spanish administration among important portions of the Dominican population, as well as the advance of South American insurgents, who strengthened their presence in some coastal points of the country, sometimes in connivance with Haitian officials. It can be deduced from the comparison of the documents that certain influential figures on the northern border leaned in favor of the union with Haiti, as a feasible means to end Spanish rule, which was unable to undertake any work of economic promotion. The appearance of the “Pro-Haitian party” was in line with the strengthening of Boyer's power and the development of a progressive spirit among some Dominicans resulting from the resentment that the reestablishment of Spanish rule in 1809 had given rise to. This points to the hypothesis that Diego Polanco and Andrés Amarante should not have acted out of fear of Haiti's military power; (It is notable that both belonged to the ruling sectors of the extreme northwest, which continued to depend on the border trade in cattle, since export agriculture had not yet been developed).

Some historians have considered that Boyer obtained support on the exclusive basis of the threat, thereby ignoring the emergence of a current favorable to Haiti that, without a doubt, aroused some support in portions of the Dominican population. As part of this panorama, when Boyer's interest in incorporating the Dominican territory was incontrovertibly revealed, with independence already proclaimed by Núñez de Cáceres, part of the elites of the towns located west of Santo Domingo decided to bow to what that they must have considered an inevitable outcome, which they saw no point in opposing because it could lead to draconian reprisals, such as those carried out by Jean-Jacques Dessalines in 1805. Surely these sectors would have preferred another solution, and in this sense it is defensible that the threat operated latent that lay behind the formalities exhibited by the Haitian president. Aside from the loyalty that many still had towards Spain, for many Dominicans, especially those in the ruling sectors, it was inconceivable to once again be under the tutelage of former slaves, whom they viewed as inferior for reasons of "race."

=== Preparations for independence ===
Despite the collective animosity towards Spain, the position of the circle animated by Núñez de Cáceres in the city of Santo Domingo was clear. Endowed with political sense, Núñez de Cáceres grasped the notion that the deterioration of the internal situation could benefit the claims of the neighboring State. Before the border insurrections, Núñez de Cáceres and his companions had outlined an independence project, but it ended up coming together in order to avoid absorption by Haiti. This rejection was motivated by social and cultural reasons harbored by the Creole ruling circles, who calculated that they would lose their social power in the scenario of integration into the neighboring State. If they were presented with the need to break with Spain, it would be to gain direct control of political power. Therein lay the dilemma that Núñez de Cáceres decided to face in the company of a portion of the exalted Creoles.

Several historians have criticized him for considering that his move to break with Spain was hasty and, therefore, paved the way for Haitian rule. These criticisms are superficial, since it has not been taken into consideration the discredit into which Spanish rule had fallen. Núñez de Cáceres had to assess that the border insurrection was going to gain followers throughout the country and that a pro-Haitian tide would rise that was impossible to stop. It must have been obvious to him that Boyer had planned his movement making it depend on an apparently spontaneous statement by the Dominican population that would grant it legality and equate it with what the independence forces on continental lands were carrying out. For his part, Núñez de Cáceres calculated that the declaration of independence could achieve sufficient support to stop Boyer's claims. Although, in retrospect, the decision was late, since the Haitian president had put together a meticulous device that allowed him to dismantle Núñez de Cáceres' attempt.

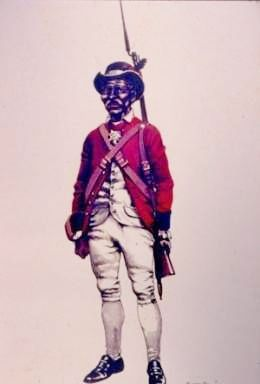
During the process of planning the independence revolt, Núñez de Cáceres managed to gain the collaboration of prominent military leaders, especially Pablo Alí.

Faced with the border insurrections, the conspirators led by Núñez de Cáceres proposed to hasten the commitment of other people, especially the troops and the administration. The main companions of Núñez de Cáceres were among the members of the Provincial Council and high officials of the administration: Juan Vicente Moscoso, perhaps the most cultured man of the time; Manuel Carvajal, Sánchez Ramírez's main lieutenant; Juan Ruiz and Vicente Mancebo, “rich owners of the interior.” In those days, as conspiratorial preparations intensified, they managed to capture the support of Colonel Pablo Alí, a former African slave from Saint-Domingue, who turned out to be the military piece of the event as he commanded the African battalion, a battalion which consisted of former Dominican slaves. Numerous Dominican garrison officers followed in Ali's footsteps, such as captains Manuel Martínez and Mariano Mendoza, and lieutenants Manuel Machado, Patricio Rodríguez and Joaquín Martínez.

=== Proclamation of independence ===
Flag of Spanish Haití

Declaration of Independence of the Dominican People (1821).

The Separatist Movement began on November 30, 1821, and the next day, on December 1, troops of the battalion assaulted the fortress, enclosing the governor within its walls. The few officers opposed to the change decided not to oppose it by force, realizing that most of their colleagues had committed themselves to the movement. Without bloodshed, the sovereignty of Spain was deposed by a conspiracy that involved few people, but which immediately received wide support in the capital city. At the dawn, the establishment of the Independent State of Spanish Haiti was announced. The rebels proceeded to the read the declaration of independence written by Núñez de Cáceres, Manuel Carvajal, Juan Vicente Moscoso, Antonio Martinez Valdés, Juan Nepomuceno de Arredondo, Juan Ruiz, Vicente Mancebo and Manuel Lopez de Umeres. Núñez de Cáceres established a provisional government, of which he was the President, and provided a Constitution that enshrined slavery even though it was considered unacceptable at the time.

== Republic of Spanish Haiti ==
=== President of the new republic ===
The legal means that Núñez de Cáceres used to give legitimacy to independence was to relate it to Bolívar's project of a unified State of a part of the former Spanish possessions, Gran Colombia. For this reason, the nascent system adopted the name of the Independent State of Spanish Haiti, and was considered an integral part of Greater Colombia. It is not to be doubted that Núñez de Cáceres and his companions agreed with Bolívar's project of a suprastate that would make ancient Spanish America an international power capable of competing with the United States and preventing any future attempt at absorption by another power. But there was also the factor that the population, not ideologically prepared for independent life, felt protected by a strange power. Even more important must have been that, eventually, Núñez de Cáceres calculated that Boyer would not venture to invade Santo Domingo for fear of possible retaliation from Gran Colombia. He did not take into account that Bolívar was focused on his military campaign and that Santo Domingo did not represent anything important within his project.

It is symptomatic that the Independent State of Spanish Haiti became the continuation of the same Provincial Council established in accordance with the Spanish constitution. Only one of the members of the Provincial Council, José Basora, a large landowner, refused to join the independent regime. Along with Núñez de Cáceres, people linked to the Spanish administration came to form the Provisional Board of the new State, some of them possessed of an intellectual level, such as Juan Vicente Moscoso, Juan Nepomuceno de Arredondo, Juan Ruiz, Antonio Martínez Valdés and Vicente Mancebo, to whom were added Manuel López de Umeres, as secretary, and Manuel Carvajal as captain general, second figure in the hierarchical order and responsible for the troops. As president of the Board, Núñez de Cáceres identified the Executive Branch with his person, apart from which he was recognized as the ideological mentor of the regime. Núñez de Cáceres ran as a representative of the leading Creole circles in the risky step of creating a State. He had to face contradictory terms. He tried to give it a liberal content as a means of gaining legitimacy among the people and contributing to the start of a modern style of progress that would leave behind what for him constituted a colonial order plagued by ignominy and oppression. The central argument of the Declaration of Independence of the Dominican people, written by him, was aimed at demonstrating the irreducible opposition between the meanness of the metropolis and the happiness of the inhabitants of America. On behalf of the population as a whole, in reality the particular interest of the elevated Creole circles that had become aware of how harmful the continuation of Spanish rule was taking shape. As in South America, a fraction of the Creole elite sought to remain in power and, in the process, resolve old conflicts with the metropolis.

Núñez de Cáceres operated as a representative of a leading social sector, but at the same time, he tried to give the new order the most popular profile possible, as long as the interests of the higher sectors were not affected, nor could it lead to difficult oppositions to deal with in delicate circumstances. The most controversial aspect of that first Dominican State was the maintenance of servitude, which came into conflict with a claim widely shared between free blacks and slaves. Núñez de Cáceres and the majority of his comrades, in accordance with their liberal position, aspired to abolish slavery, which is why he himself granted letters of manumission to all his slaves in the following days. But, at the same time, he declared that he would not incur the responsibility of condemning to misery respectable people whose only wealth resided in their slaves. The dilemma must have been dramatic, since, as an enlightened man, he must have been aware of the need for a republican system to put an end to the disgrace of serfdom; Conversely, he was forced to accept the immediate interest of the members of his social sector, thereby ruining the possibility of the new order gaining the legitimacy that would allow it to resist Boyer's foreseeable attempt. At most, the ephemeral regime vaguely stated the purpose of gradually reducing the number of slaves through a special fund that would allow their value to be paid to the owners. In the dire conditions that the public treasury was going through, this procedure lacked any viability.

=== Constitution of 1821 ===
The guidelines of the new order were expressed, also thanks to the pen of Núñez de Cáceres, in the Constitutional Act, a document of 39 articles that declared the institutional features and regulatory purposes of the nascent State. The republican system was based on a system of representation through the division of the territory into five parties. A division of powers was carried out in accordance with which the president of the Board was identified with the Executive, and the Board with the Legislative Branch. In the same way, the bases for an autonomous municipal order were laid out, although the profiles of the existing one were preserved. Guarantees were granted for the exercise of freedoms, specifically those that were of interest at the time, such as the freedom of the press. The judicial system was also organized, granting it the highest possible levels of autonomy; As long as new legislation was not expressly enacted, the existing legislation remained in force. The granting of citizenship to all free people was postulated, including those born abroad, regardless of skin color, country of origin and religious beliefs, for which the status of citizens was recognized for those who had been residing in the country for three years. country or were married to a native of Santo Domingo. Now, in the event that someone chose to maintain Spanish citizenship, they had to be expelled from any government job.

It can be seen that the constitutional guidelines sought to combine a sense of continuity of power with an openness towards liberal principles and denials of Hispanic autocracy. In this sense, measures such as the abolition of military jurisdiction and the commitment to guarantees for the integrity of the person are considerable. The same constitutional statute stipulated that a delegate would be sent to Gran Colombia in order to formalize integration into that State. Antonio María Pineda, who had been director of the first newspaper in the country, received a commission for this. His mission was unsuccessful, since Bolívar was far from Bogotá and only came to learn of the creation of the State of Spanish Haiti when it had ceased to exist. In a letter sent to Santander, in charge of the government in Bogotá, Bolívar limited himself to ambiguously suggesting that attention should be paid to those who had expressed solidarity with Gran Colombia; but he also introduced a dark cloud in his reflection, by indicating that control over Santo Domingo could be used to benefit some future diplomatic negotiations. Whether it was due to the disinterest of the South American independentists or because they were very far from Santo Domingo, Pineda's mission was ineffective

== End of Republic ==
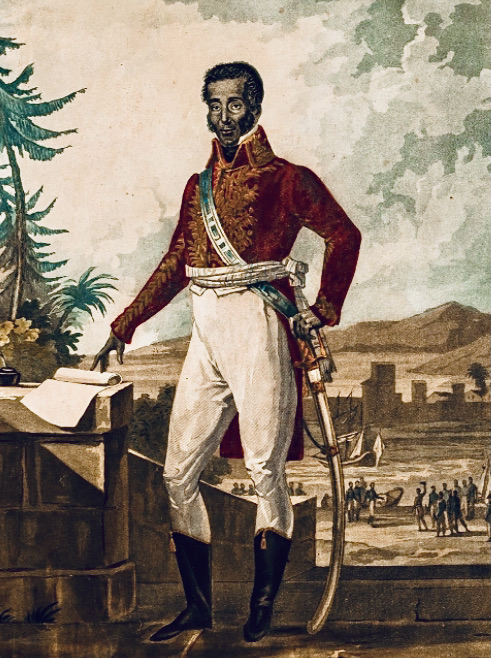
Portrait of Jean-Pierre Boyer

The Act also stipulated that relations with Haiti should be maintained, for which a treaty of friendship and alliance would be proposed that would guarantee the security of both countries. December 1, 1821 coincided with the visit of a delegate from Boyer, Colonel Fremont, sent to calm the spirits of the Spanish governor Pascual Real. Núñez de Cáceres took advantage of his presence to send a letter to Boyer in which he proposed peace and friendship between the two States. However, instead of accepting this suggestion, Boyer responded, on January 11, 1822, that Haiti should govern the entire island, as a guarantee of its existence, and that, therefore, it would not hinder those who flew the Haitian flag in the former Spanish part. This declaration was accompanied by an increase in the incentive for Dominicans in favor of the merger with Haiti.

There are signs that new agents came out of Port-au-Prince to pressure notable citizens of various towns to proclaim their submission to Haiti. Núñez de Cáceres' ability to maneuver was almost nil, since, despite his moderate attitude of respect for the ruling interests, portions of said media opposed the independent order. The greatest hostility came from the Peninsulars who were unwilling to renounce their Spanish citizenship. Although the Spanish were not many at that time, they had preeminence in two key sectors: the clergy and high commerce. Priests, despite the reduction in the power of the Church, continued to be the group with the most social and cultural influence in the country. The opposition of many of them was highlighted by the archbishop, who refused all dealings with the new authorities and requested that he be allowed to leave the country. The merchants, for their part, mostly Catalans, closed ranks against Núñez de Cáceres, which had a special significance since they already constituted the sector that wielded the greatest economic power. But even a significant portion of the large Crele landowners did not hide their hostility towards the independent regime, surely because they felt Spanish and considered that there was no possibility of the country subsisting as an autonomous entity.

From the beginning of January, Boyer arranged the formation of the troops with which he planned to occupy Santo Domingo, summoning the main generals for this purpose. While carrying out these activities, the San Luis Fortress was attacked by a pro-Haitian group led by Juan Núñez Blanco, after which they proceeded to integrate a large part of the Cibao region into Haiti and to establish a junta that repudiated the Independent State of Spanish Haiti with the charge that his work was “shapeless and antisocial,” for not having abolished slavery. In the following days, the notables of almost all the towns located west of Santo Domingo signed documents rejecting Núñez de Cáceres, through which Boyer was called to enter the country to be incorporated into Haiti. At the end of January it was obvious that the Independence State of Spanish Haiti had no chance of surviving, since its authority had been practically reduced to the city of Santo Domingo. Based on the French phrases and grammatical imperfections that appear in the pro-Haitian proclamations, it has been assumed that they were apocryphal, made years later to legitimize Haitian sovereignty over Santo Domingo in the face of Spain's claims for return. The reality is that the documents were signed at that time, in correspondence with the collapse of the authority of Núñez de Cáceres and the plausible fear that many of the signatories harbored of Haitian reprisals. Of course, they responded to incitements from the Haitian capital, which is evident in the defective Spanish with which they were written.

When Núñez de Cáceres read Boyer's message, he realized that annexation with Gran Colombia would be impossible; the majority of the Dominican social and military elite preferred to ally with Haiti. Thus, he had no other choice but to answer Boyer's military command, and he agreed for the city to be placed under the protection of Haitian occupation. Whether it was due to pressure and fear or because there was an effective pro-Haitian current, the truth is that the autonomous project was isolated and Núñez de Cáceres could not present opposition to the entry of Boyer, who was well received in the towns through which he went passing in front of his numerous troops. Núñez de Cáceres adopted an incoherent posture when it was his turn to receive Boyer and give him the keys to the walled city. Perhaps obeying the overwhelming weight of the accomplished fact, he dared to assert that the incorporation of Haiti would be the last political event in the history of the Dominican people. Contrary to this erroneous assumption, he had the foresight to hint to Boyer, in the speech he gave at the formal transfer of command, that the differences in language and customs made assimilation between both peoples difficult.

In August, Núñez de Cáceres Cáceres was still in Santo Domingo, making clandestine efforts to obtain support from the authorities of Gran Colombia. Boyer learned of his activities and demanded that he be exiled, arguing that his presence on the island was an inconvenience and that, if he did not leave voluntarily, force would be used. However, Boyer granted him an annuity for life.

== Later years ==
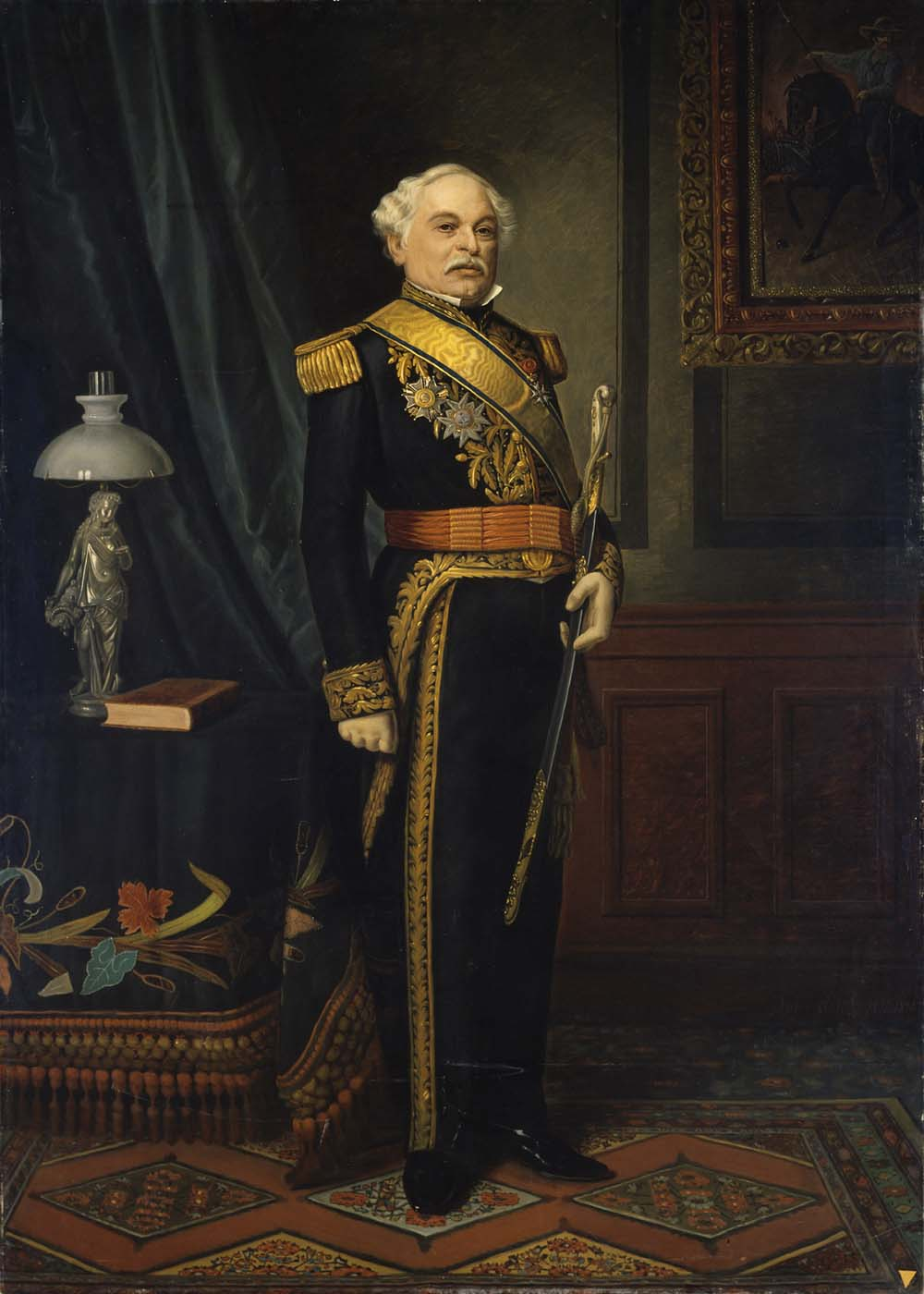
In the years following his expulsion from the island, Núñez de Cáceres began taking part in many conflicts in Latin America. One such case was his participation in the anti-Gran Colombia conspiracy, La Cosiata, led by one of Simon Bolivar's former collaborator, José Antonio Páez.

In April 1823, Núñez de Cáceres emigrated with his family to Venezuela, where they settled in Maracaibo. In 1824, he began working as a printer in Caracas. Later, he founded several newspapers critical of Gran Colombia: El Constitucional Caraqueño (1824-1825), El Cometa (1824-1826) and El Cometa Extraordinario (1826-1827). In addition, the last issues of El Venezolano were also written by him (1823-1824). He also joined the movement of La Cosiata, which rebelled against Gran Colombia. On May 5, 1826, when Caracas decided to take part in the revolution of José Antonio Páez, a leader of the Venezuelan War of Independence, Núñez de Cáceres and Pedro Pablo Diaz were chosen to advise Páez. In 1827, Páez made de Cáceres his secretary and advisor. Because of de Cáceres' position in the government of Venezuela, he was able to promote the breakup of Venezuela from Gran Colombia. However, this caused him to be imprisoned in Maracaibo for a short period of time. Bolivar took Núñez de Cáceres away from Caracas and suggested that he become the president of the Superior Court of Cumaná, but Núñez de Cáceres rejected the proposition and decided to move to Mexico with his family.

Núñez de Cáceres arrived in Mexico in April 1827. Initially, they settled in Puebla, but then changed their residence to Ciudad Victoria, in Tamaulipas. In the early years, he practiced law. In 1830, he obtained the office of prosecutor of the supreme court and in 1833 become a senator of Tamaulipas and a member of the Mexican Confederation Congress, and was recognized as a Distinguished Citizen of Tamaulipas.

He served with General Francisco Moctezuma de Chilapa at the Pozo de los Carmelos and endorsed his agenda. In 1834, he became treasurer of Public Finance, although he continued to serve as a lawyer.

By 1844, he had become seriously ill, and the State Government and the Departmental Board of Tamaulipas gave him a pension to alleviate his struggles. He died in Ciudad Victoria, Tamaulipas, on September 11, 1846. His remains rest in the National Pantheon of the Dominican Republic in Santo Domingo.

== Literary career ==
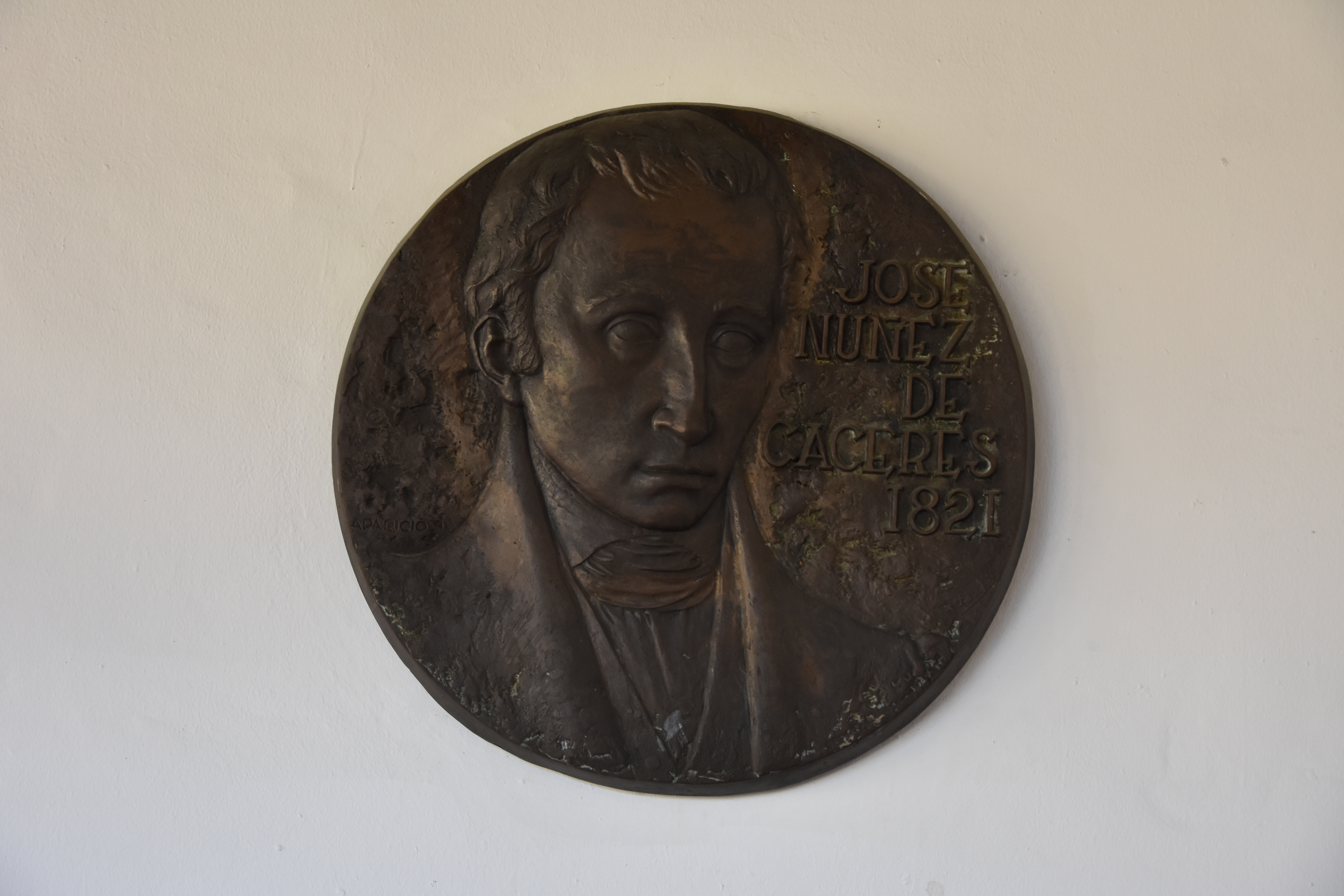
Face of José Núñez de Caceres imprinted on a coin

José Núñez de Cáceres also played an important role as a writer and teacher. He became a professor at the University of Santo Tomás de Aquino in 1795. On January 6, 1815, he returned to teaching at the University of Santo Domingo. Because of the efforts he made as captain-general, Nuñez was appointed as the first rector of the university, and had his portrait placed in the lecture hall, paid for by the guild.

On April 15, 1821, José Núñez de Cáceres founded the satirical and political newspaper El Duende in Santo Domingo. This was the second newspaper to be published in the Dominican Republic. El Duende was released each Sunday in the capital of the colony and ran for thirteen issues, but was cancelled on July 15 of that year. Nuñez published his first nine fables in this newspaper. He also founded the newspaper called El Relámpago (Lightning) in the same city. In Venezuela, Nuñez founded several newspapers: El Constitucional Caraqueño (The Constitutional from Caracas), La Cometa (The Comet), a newspaper that harshly attacked Simón Bolívar, and El Cometa Extraordinario. In addition, the last issues of El Venezolano were also written by him. In Venezuela, he wrote fables to supplement his participation in the forums and engagement in journalism.

He wrote twelve fables, which include: el conejo (the rabbit), la oveja y el lobo (the sheep and the wolf), el lobo y el zorro (the wolf and the fox), la araña y el águila (the spider and the eagle) and la aveja y abejorros (the bee and bumble). These fables were signed under the pseudonym "El fabulista principiante" (The fabulist beginner). He was credited as the first Dominican fabulist and one of the first storytellers in Hispanic America.

Núñez de Cáceres was well-read. He was familiar with the classic 'fabulists' (Aesop, Phaedrus, Jean de La Fontaine, Samaniego and Tomás de Iriarte). They influenced him, especially when it came to the use of animals as characters. Of the nineteen characters who act in the eleven tales of the Creole fabulist, thirteen are found in Iriarte, twelve in Aesop and La Fontaine, nine in Phaedrus and eight in Samaniego. The mule, horse, donkey, cross, and bumble appear in two of the fables of Núñez de Cáceres, but not in fables written by the classic fabulists above.

== Personal life ==
At the end of the 18th century, Núñez de Cáceres married Juana de Mata Madrigal Cordero. They had six children between the years 1800 and 1816, of which three were born in Camagüey, Cuba.

After de Cáceres' death, his disciple, Simon de Portes, gave a speech at his burial:

"Rare event: here, not far Padilla, which ceased to be the hero of Igualada, which sealed the independence of Mexico, Dominican gentleman dies almost hear the roar of the cannon of the unjust invading Anglo-time same as before his death this unfortunate hero rejoices with the nice idea that the inhabitants of Santo Domingo, after many battles, been driven from its territory to its oppressors ... It is full of joy José Núñez de Cáceres with such a happy event, and as you stop the course of death gradually led him to the grave ".

— Simon de Portes

== See also ==
- España Boba
- Republic of Spanish Haiti
- Haitian occupation of Santo Domingo
- El Duende
- Juan Sánchez Ramírez
- Andrés López de Medrano
- Juan Vicente Moscoso
- Dominican War of Independence

== Bibliography ==
- Cassá, Roberto (2014). Personajes Dominicanos [Dominican Characters] (in Spanish) (2nd ed.). Santo Domingo. ISBN 9789945586046.
- Coiscou Henríquez, Máximo. Documentos para la historia de Santo Domingo. 2 vols. Madrid, 1973.
- García, José Gabriel. Rasgos biográficos de dominicanos célebres. Santo Domingo, 1971.
- García, José Gabriel. Compendio de la historia de Santo Domingo. 4 vols. Santo Domingo, 1968.
- Lepervanche Parecel, René. Núñez de Cáceres y Bolívar. Caracas, 1939.
- Martínez, Rufino. Diccionario biográfico-histórico dominicano (1821–1930). Santo Domingo, 1997.
- Mejía Ricart, Gustavo A. El Estado Independiente de Haití Español. Santiago, 1938.
- Rodríguez Demorizi, Emilio. Santo Domingo y la Gran Colombia. Santo Domingo, 1971.
- Rodríguez Demorizi, Emilio. La imprenta y los primeros periódicos de Santo Domingo. Ciudad Trujillo, 1944.
