= Juan Vicente Moscoso =

Dominican educator and politician (1777–1837)

Dr. Juan Vicente Moscoco Carvajal (June 3, 1777 – September 29, 1837), nicknamed the "Dominican Socrates", was a lawyer, politician, educator and assessor of the royal artillery of Santo Domingo. He was mayor of Santo Domingo during the period of España Boba ("Foolish Spain"), among other public offices. He obtained a doctorate of canon law and civic law from the University of Santo Tomas de Aquino in 1791.

== Role as educator and independentist ==
He was vice rector in 1817 and rector in 1818 of the University Santo Tomas de Aquino after its reopening by Jose Nunez de Caceres in 1815. When the university was closed by the Haitian authorities, he became an independent instructor at the plazas of the city of Santo Domingo using the Socratic method as his method of teaching which gave him the name of the "Dominican Socrates".

The founding father of the Dominican Republic, Juan Pablo Duarte, was his disciple and obtained his superior studies (latin, philosophy and law) from him due to the closure of the university. He became the instructor of many other famous Dominican intellectuals such as Felix Maria del Monte. After his exile to Cuba by the Haitian authorities, his void was filled by priest Gaspar Hernandez.

He was one of the signatories of the Declaration of Independence of December 1, 1821 together with Jose Nunez de Caceres, Manuel Carvajal, and others which led to the "Ephemeral Independence". He was also part of the provisional government of the newly founded state of "Haiti Espanol" and signed its constitution act.

In 1824, he became one of the first conspirators against the Haitian occupation being the leading figure of the "Conspiracy of Los Alcarrizos" along with his brother Esteban Moscoso Carvajal with the purpose of returning Santo Domingo back again to Spain.

== Exile to Cuba ==
He was exiled to Cuba during the Haitian occupation where he became the head of the canon and civil law of the Seminario school until his death in 1837.

He was cousin of the captain, lawyer of the Real Audiencia and hero of Battle Palo Hincado Lic. Tomas (Toso) Ramirez Carvajal as well as cousin, twice removed, of the historian and politician José Gabriel García. Dr. Moscoso was also the great-uncle of the scientists Rafael Moscoso Puello and Dr. Francisco Moscoso Puello.
