= El Duende (newspaper) =

Dominican newspaper

- Founder: José Núñez de Cáceres
- Founded: April 15, 1821
- Ceased publication: July 15, 1821
- Language: Spanish
- Headquarters: Santo Domingo, Dominican Republic

El Duende was a Dominican newspaper from Santo Domingo founded by José Núñez de Cáceres. It was the second Dominican paper. It printed its first issue just a few days after Núñez de Cáceres' second paper, El Telégrafo Continental de Santo Domingo, had appeared. Both papers were the result of an increasing politicization among the Dominican criollos in Santo Domingo, who were at the time under the Spanish colonial government. Political satire, opinions, and dialogue about the colony's relation with Spain were the main uses of this paper. Though it lasted for only four months, it left a precedent that inspired similar contributions later in the 19th century. Through it, Núñez de Cáceres developed himself as a fabulist, publishing stories he signed as "El Fabulista Principiante" (novice).
