= Pablo Alí =

Military commander

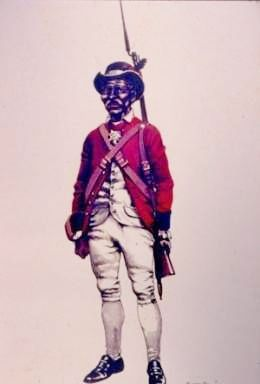
Pablo Alí

Pablo Alí was a chief military commander of African origin, who was in charge of the so-called Battalion 31 or Batallon de Morenos (Dark-skinned Battalion), freed slaves which joined the ranks of the Dominican army. Alí directed the battalion to participate in the Italian rebellion of 1810, during the government of Juan Sánchez Ramírez. He was said to have been "most prominent, achieving great military distinction in Santo Domingo".

== Early life ==
Nothing is known about his life and activities as a slave in the French colony of Saint-Domingue. He was born, as he himself said, in Africa. On the night of August 22, 1791, thousands of slaves from the northern department of the colony of Saint Domingue rebelled against their masters. The Haitian Revolution soon spread to other parts of the colony. He was captained by Dutty Boukman, Jean Francois Patacu and George Biassou. The latter's lieutenant was Toussaint Louverture. With Bouckman dead and in view of his critical situation, the other black leaders requested the mediation of the Spanish governor, Joaquín García, to reach a pact that would end the fight in exchange for several concessions.

== Change of alliegance ==
The proclamation of the French Republic on September 21, 1792, and the subsequent execution of Louis XVI radically changed the course of events in both colonies. The war between Spain and France became inevitable. The Spanish governor asked Madrid for instructions on the behavior to follow with the thousands of rebellious slaves, since due to their number and military capacity they could constitute a serious danger to the Spanish cause, and suggested winning them over to her by offering them certain rewards. The negotiations ended successfully and around 10,000 rebels went over to the Spanish side under the name of auxiliary blacks. Among them was Alí himself, who was Biassou's subordinate. On October 18, 1795, news was received in neighboring Santo Domingo, that Spain had ceded the eastern part of the island to France under the Treaty of Basel, which ended the war. According to that treaty, all auxiliary blacks had to leave the island. Pablo Alí and some lower-ranking officers chose to stay in Santo Domingo.

== Declaration of War on Spain ==
England, viewing the Treaty of Basel with concern, declared war on Spain in 1797. The British army occupied San Juan de la Maguana and Neiba, but after several negotiations the English withdrew from the island in April 1798. Before leaving, Governor García had discovered a plot hatched by the Cuban Juan Antonio Angulo and the Italian Domingo Asserato to hand over the Spanish colony to England, for which purpose they tried to win over Ali and Agustín, two of the most reputable officers in Biassou 's army. Both refused to cooperate with the conspirators, so García praised their fidelity and recommended them to the monarch. Ali and Agustín lived miserably and wanted to join Biassou, their former boss, in Florida. Ali himself informed the king of his state of destitution on August 26, 1798, in the plea he addressed to him to continue paying him the thirty pesos of salary that he received for his status as captain of the auxiliary blacks, a sum that was He had suspended him after the peace with France.

== War of Reconquest ==
During the War of Reconquista, Alí allied himself with the troops of Juan Sánchez Ramírez, the criollo general who fought against French general, Jean-Louis Ferrand, whom he had supported three years before. In that war, he must have distinguished himself, since the Regency awarded him on 2 September 1811 the rank of lieutenant colonel and the gold medal with the bust of the monarch. There is no further information about Ali in the period between 1811 and 1820. However, on 9 November 1820, Colonel Isnardi, Jean-Pierre Boyer's aide-de-camp, wrote him a letter urging him to submit to the Haitian Government and collaborate with him in the plan to take over Santo Domingo, while reminding him of his Haitian origin.

While Boyer plotted his designs, José Núñez de Cáceres acted to make the colony independent. That task was not easy, since Governor Pascual Real had obtained the loyalty of Ali and his soldiers. Despite this, the governor could not control the situation because Núñez de Cáceres resorted to a stratagem to win over Ali. The prosecutor of the Treasury, one of the plotters, informed him of the existence of a Royal Order that denied his application for Spanish citizenship, but assured him that it would promote him in rank and grant the freedom of all slaves if he joined the movement against Spain, an offer that Ali accepted, occupying the fortress with his people and thus allowing Núñez de Cáceres to proclaim independence from Spain on 1 December 1821.

== Haitian occupation ==
In the early years of the Haitian regime, Ali remained in the service of Haiti. He must have carried out the functions assigned to him to the entire satisfaction of the new regime, since in 1831 he was the owner of the Engombe mill donated to him by Boyer. There it was lost from sight until 1843, when the revolt against Boyer known as the Reform Revolution took place. The news of the overthrow of the Haitian president broke in the city of Santo Domingo on March 24. Immediately, Dominican revolutionary Juan Pablo Duarte and the other members of the patriotic society La Trinitaria, which advocated the independence of the former Spanish part, managed to get Alí to join their side and forced Governor Bernard-Philippe-Alexis Carrié to capitulate.

== Death ==
The popular Junta that was formed appointed General Etienne Desgrotte as commander of arms of the square and Ali as head of the department. In that position he died on February 14, 1844, thirteen days before the founding of the Dominican Republic.
