= Geographic regions of the Dominican Republic =

The Dominican Republic is divided into three macro-regions, which are in turn divided into ten regions.

In 1858 the country was divided in 3 departments: Cibao (North), Ozama (Southwest), and Seybo (Southeast).

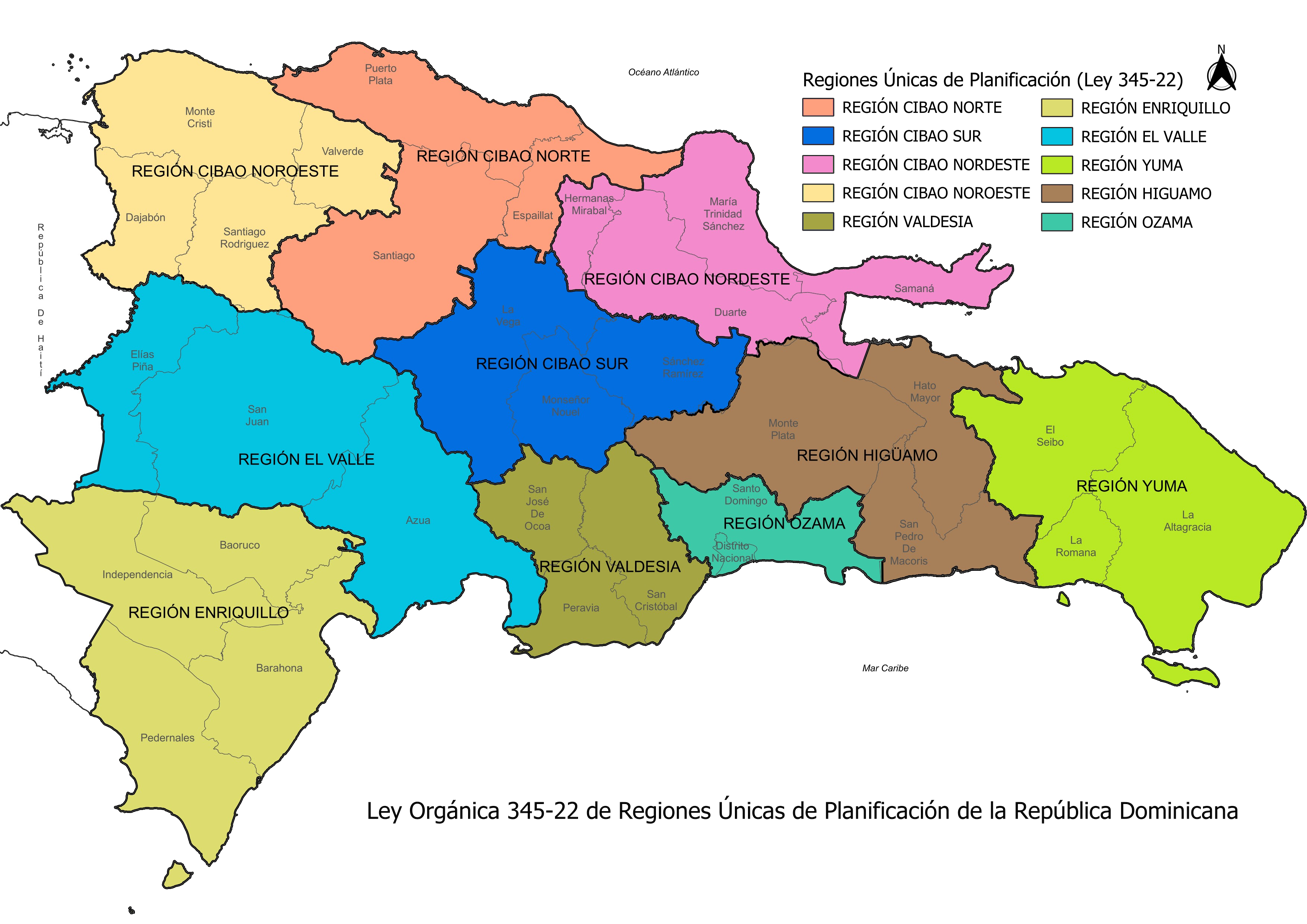

Regional divisions and provinces in Dominican Republic
Macro-regions	Regions	Provinces
Norte/Cibao	Cibao Nordeste	Duarte
Norte/Cibao	Cibao Nordeste	Hermanas Mirabal
Norte/Cibao	Cibao Nordeste	María Trinidad Sánchez
Norte/Cibao	Cibao Nordeste	Samaná
Norte/Cibao	Cibao Noroeste	Dajabón
Norte/Cibao	Cibao Noroeste	Monte Cristi
Norte/Cibao	Cibao Noroeste	Santiago Rodríguez
Norte/Cibao	Cibao Noroeste	Valverde
Norte/Cibao	Cibao Norte	Espaillat
Norte/Cibao	Cibao Norte	Puerto Plata
Norte/Cibao	Cibao Norte	Santiago
Norte/Cibao	Cibao Sur	La Vega
Norte/Cibao	Cibao Sur	Monseñor Nouel
Norte/Cibao	Cibao Sur	Sánchez Ramírez
Sur	Valdesia	Azua
Sur	Valdesia	Peravia
Sur	Valdesia	San José de Ocoa
Sur	Valdesia	San Cristóbal
Sur	El Valle	Elías Piña
Sur	El Valle	San Juan
Sur	Enriquillo	Barahona
Sur	Enriquillo	Bahoruco
Sur	Enriquillo	Independencia
Sur	Enriquillo	Pedernales
Este/Sureste	Ozama	Distrito Nacional
Este/Sureste	Ozama	Santo Domingo
Este/Sureste	Higüamo	Hato Mayor
Este/Sureste	Higüamo	Monte Plata
Este/Sureste	Higüamo	San Pedro de Macorís
Este/Sureste	Yuma	El Seibo
Este/Sureste	Yuma	La Romana
Este/Sureste	Yuma	La Altagracia
