= USS Ozama =

Cargo ship of the United States Navy

History

United States
- Name: USS Ozama
- Namesake: Previous name retained
- Builder: Detroit Shipbuilding Company, Wyandotte, Michigan
- Launched: 7 October 1916
- Completed: 1916
- Acquired: 24 December 1917
- Commissioned: 24 December 1917
- Decommissioned: 13 February 1919
- Fate: Returned to owners 13 February 1919
- Notes: In commercial service as SS Ozama 1916-1917 and from 1919

General characteristics
- Type: Naval mine carrier
- Displacement: 4,300 tons (nominal)
- Length: 261 ft (80 m)
- Beam: 43 ft 6 in (13.26 m)
- Draft: 18 ft 6 in (5.64 m) (mean)
- Speed: 9 knots
- Complement: 59
- Armament: 2 × 3-inch (76.2-millimeter) guns

USS Ozama was a naval mine carrier that served in the United States Navy from 1917 to 1919.

SS Ozama was built as a commercial cargo ship by the Detroit Shipbuilding Company at Wyandotte, Michigan, in 1916. The U.S. Navy acquired her from the Atlantic, Gulf, and West Indies Steamship Line on 24 December 1917 for World War I service and commissioned her the same day as USS Ozama. Unlike many of the former merchant ships the Navy acquired in 1917 and 1918 for use in the war, Ozama did not receive a Navy identification number (Id. No.).

Fitted out at Norfolk, Virginia, as a naval mine carrier, Ozama cleared Hampton Roads, Virginia, for Scotland early in 1918. On 15 February 1918, she arrived in the Firth of Clyde with a cargo of nava; minelaying equipment to be used on the North Sea Mine Barrage.

On 3 April 1918, Ozama she returned to Norfolk and for the remainder of the war continued to ply the Atlantic Ocean to keep naval mine bases in Scotland supplied with their specialized equipment.

Following the Armistice with Germany that ended the war on 11 November 1918, Ozama supported mine clearance operations in the North Sea.

Ozama returned to Norfolk for the last time in her naval career on 28 January 1919. On 13 February 1919 she was decommissioned and returned to the Atlantic, Gulf, and West Indies Steamship Line.
