= Republic of Spanish Haiti =

Period of Dominican statehood following the 1st independence from Spain (1821–1822)

Republic of Spanish Haiti República del Haití Español (Spanish) State of Santo Domingo Estado de Santo Domingo (Spanish)
- 1821–1822
- Flag Coat of arms

- Hispaniola from 1820-1822
- Status: State of Gran Colombia (by constitution)
- Capital: Santo Domingo
- Ethnic groups (1820): 70% Dominicans; 30% Peninsular Spaniards
- Religion (1820): 97% Catholic; 2% Other
- Demonym: Dominican/Spaniard
- Government: Presidential republic
  - 1821-1822: José Núñez de Cáceres
- Legislature: Congress
- History
  - Ephemeral Independence: 1 December 1821
  - Haitian occupation: 9 February 1822

Area
  - Total: 54,442 km^{2} (21,020 sq mi)
- Currency: Spanish dollar
- Time zone: UTC-4
Preceded by	Succeeded by
España Boba	Republic of Haiti
- Today part of: Dominican Republic

The Republic of Spanish Haiti (Spanish: República del Haití Español), also called the State of Santo Domingo (Estado de Santo Domingo) was a former unrecognized breakaway state that succeeded the Captaincy General of Santo Domingo after independence was declared on 1 December 1821 by José Núñez de Cáceres. The state's constitution declared it as a state of Gran Colombia. The republic lasted only from 1 December 1821 to 9 February 1822 when it was annexed by the Republic of Haiti.

== History ==
=== Background ===
As a result of the Peace of Basel, the part of Hispaniola under Spanish administration was ceded to France, and merged with the French colony of Saint Domingue. When the Haitian Revolution triumphed and independence was declared by Jean-Jacques Dessalines, the eastern part of the island remained under French control until the criollos revolted and Santo Domingo was reconquered by Anglo-Dominican forces in 1809.

After Santo Domingo was restored to Spanish rule, however, the government could not afford to exercise its full powers on the colony, its resources severely depleted by both the Peninsular War and the various Spanish American wars of independence. For the next twelve years, Santo Domingo's economy suffered. Most farming was solely for subsistence, little economic aid was invested in the island, the only money the royal government sent to the island was the salaries of royal employees, and, once political stability returned to Spain in 1814, its focus was on the more productive island of Cuba, leaving the administration of Santo Domingo as an afterthought. During this time, many conspiracies and juntas were established against the apparent abandon of the colony's citizens by royal authorities, but were promptly neutralized.

This period of Dominican history is known as the España Boba ("Foolish Spain").

=== Preparations for independence (1820–1821) ===
In 1820, Haitian president Jean-Pierre Boyer decided to prepare for a rumored Spanish military incursion into Haiti, and sent Colonel Dezir Dalmassi to nearby towns such as San José de las Matas, San Juan de la Maguana, and Azua to convince locals to join a republic that would provide them with jobs, land, abolition of taxes in the exportation of livestock, in return of accepting the political unification of the island under Haitian rule. Instead of waiting for Dalmassi's return to Haiti, Boyer decided to invade the eastern part of the Island before the separatists could finalize their intent to declare independence.

On 1 December 1821, a constitutive act was ordered to petition the union of Spanish Haiti with Gran Colombia. The state of the Republic of Spanish Haiti was not supported by the population of slaves and servants, who were wary of the rule of pure whites, and preferred to unite with French Haiti, because of their abolition of slavery.

In late 1821 and early 1822, Haiti sent emissaries to the central and northern parts of Spanish Haiti to promote its annexation, and the people began to raise the Haitian flag on public buildings and plazas, such as Hincha (present-day Hinche), but also in large cities like Puerto Plata (13 December 1821), Dajabón (15 December), Santiago (29 December) and La Vega (4 January 1822), whereas other forces which opposed unification with Haiti formally declared independence from Spain on 1 December 1821.

=== Independence (1821–1822) ===
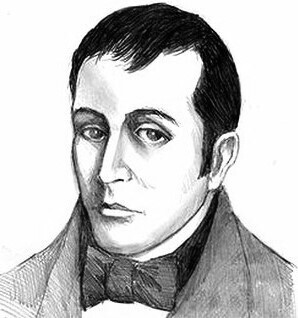
José Núñez de Cáceres

On 30 November 1821, at 11:30 p.m. the tropas de morenos (Spanish for 'colored/dark-skinned troops'), led by Pablo Alí and Núñez de Cáceres, stormed the Fortaleza Ozama garrison and detained Governor Pascual Real in the Torre del Homenaje (the keep) of Santo Domingo. The next morning, at 6:00 am, cannon fire signalled the political change taking place.

A group of politicians and military officers continued to favor uniting the new nation with Haiti, as various elite families sought for political stability under Haitian president Boyer. A large faction based in the northern Cibao region were opposed to the union with Gran Colombia, and also sided with Boyer. Boyer, on the other hand, sought to protect his country from the possibility of either France or Spain retaking the eastern side of the island, and attacking or even re-conquering Haiti. He sought not only to maintain Haitian independence, but to maintain the freedom of its former slaves, as well as to liberate the remaining slaves in Spanish Haiti. After promising his protection to the government of Núñez de Cáceres, Boyer entered with a force of 12,000 soldiers in February 1822, after most cities and towns proclaimed its annexation to the Republic of Haiti between November 1821 and January 1822, including Puerto Plata (13 December 1821) and Santiago (29 December 1821).

On 9 February 1822, Boyer formally entered the capital city, Santo Domingo, where he was met with enthusiasm, and received by Núñez de Cáceres, who offered to him the keys to the city. Boyer rejected the offer saying: "I have not come into this city as a conqueror, but by the will of its inhabitants." Hispaniola was thus united from "Cape Tiburon to Cape Samaná in possession of one government."

=== Political reforms ===
The first public act of Boyer was to enact the abolition of slavery and promise lands to all freedmen, so they could freely dedicate their lives to agriculture in acres donated by the state.

In Haiti, the French system of private land ownership guaranteed by the state was the norm, while in the Spanish section, the predominant system was communal grounds, and a hierarchy of tenancy that clashed. By 15 June, Boyer was still promising nationally donated land. To donate this land, the Haitian administration prohibited ownership of land by white Dominicans, depriving the main popular families of the country of their lands.

The portion of former slaves who did not wish to keep working with their former masters had little option but to join the military, which formed the Battalion 22, which joined the "morenos libres" (free coloreds/dark-skinned people) under Colonel Pablo Alí constituting the principal military force in the eastern part of the island.

Other cultural changes were the restriction of the Spanish language, and traditional customs, like cockfights were outlawed.

Boyer enacted a rural code which was "designed to force yeomen into large-scale production of export crops. The nation, however, lacked the wherewithal, the enthusiasm, and the discipline to enforce the code".

Haitian rule over the entire island lasted 22 years. Eventually, the Haitian government became very unpopular, due to the severe economic crisis that hit the country after paying reparations to France for the liberation of the Haitian people from slavery and the loss of the colony. Additionally, the United States refused to recognize Haiti diplomatically, viewing Haiti's anti-slavery ambitions a fundamental threat. The isolation from trade with the U.S. and other pro-slavery nations severely undermined Haiti's ability to economically thrive. The instability gave rise to many anti-Haitian plots. It wasn't until 1844 that independence was once again proclaimed for the eastern side of Hispaniola by Juan Pablo Duarte y Díez, and the independent nation of the Dominican Republic was established.

== See also ==
- History of the Dominican Republic
- José Núñez de Cáceres
- Unification of Hispaniola
