= SS Ozama (1881) =

Coordinates: 33.005°N 79.359°W

History

United States
- Name: SS Ozama
- Owner: W.P. Clyde & Co.
- Builder: Ramage and Ferguson's shipbuilding yard at Leith
- Launched: 17 May 1881 as SS Craigallion
- Renamed: SS Ozama
- Fate: Wrecked off Cape Romain, 23 November 1894

General characteristics
- Tonnage: 1,028.01 gross; 766.37 net; 762 under deck
- Length: overall 216 ft 5 in (65.96 m); quarterdeck 76 ft (23 m); forecastle 30 ft (9.1 m)
- Beam: 30 ft 1 in (9.17 m)
- Depth of hold: 15 ft 1 in (4.60 m)
- Propulsion: Compound Inverted, two-cylinder engine; one 25" high pressure cylinder; one 50" low pressure cylinder; with 33" stroke of piston; 75 psi boiler pressure; 99 horsepower

The American steamer Ozama, weighing 1028 tons, was the former British steamer Craigallion, built by Ramage & Ferguson in 1881, at Leith, Scotland. She had a colorful history, with a mutiny and gunrunning. She was shipwrecked twice, the first time in 1885 in the Bahamas, and the second, in 1894 on the outer shoal of Cape Romain, South Carolina. She was named after the Ozama River in Santo Domingo, Dominican Republic, which was one of her regular ports of call.

== 1884: Towing history ==
This steamer was definitely a powerful and well-built ship as evidenced by the fact that she was selected and used to tow the Nathan Appleton from New York to Central America, the Nathan Appleton was the second of the great dredges to be used in the construction of the Panama Canal.

== 1885: Wrecked in the Bahamas ==
The British steamer Craigallion, which was in distress at Watling's Island in April 1885, parted her hawsers, drifted upon the reefs and was wrecked. She was afterwards salvaged and towed from Nassau into Norfolk by the American wrecking steamer Resolute. Cragallion was described as in "fair condition, and is a very successful piece of wrecking work." It was this act of salvage that placed her into American hands.

== 1886: Mutiny ==
Ozama's cook and steward were charged with mutiny by their captain, and held for the Grand Jury on 24 June 1886, by United States Commissioner Allen, in Brooklyn.

== 1888: Gun running ==
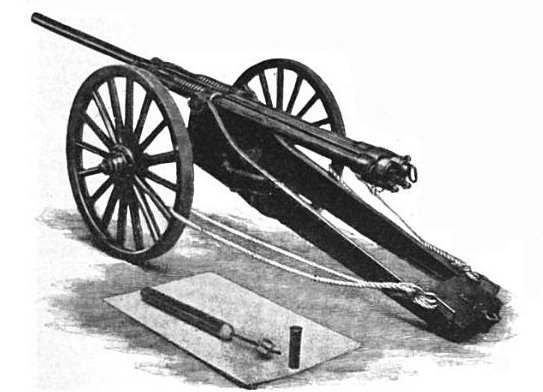
Sims-Dudley 4 Inch Dynamite Gun on a field carriage

There is no question that Ozama was involved in gunrunning. A contemporary newspaper carried the following account:

The dock of the Clyde Steamship company at Pier 15, East river, is fast assuming the appearance of an arsenal during war times. At the pier is the steamship Ozama, which sails in a few hours for ports in Hayti and San Domingo. The greater part of her hold, it appears, will be used for storing place for arms and gunpowder for the alleged Haytian rebel, Hyppolyte.

When the Clyde People endeavored to ship arms through the insurgents secretly, the Haytian consul in this city endeavored to stop the ship. But now that the company is shipping warlike material openly no word is said in opposition to its plans.

A reporter made an investigation of the arms on the Clyde docks. Some 500 rifles, in cases of ten each, were piled up on top of each other at the entrance of the dock. The cases were marked in large stenciled letters, 'Rifles,' and addressed to 'S. Cape Haytien.'

The cases of rifles were piled up all around three larger cases. One case was about 10 by 12 by 15 feet. This case and two other smaller ones of about 6 by 4 by 10, also marked "S. Cape Haytien," bore in heavy stenciled black letters the words 'Gatling Gun.'

But the most deadly of all these warlike appliances was discovered when a wooden box about fifteen feet long, one foot square and with both ends carefully sealed with zinc, was examined.

The attendant on the dock said that the mysterious box contains a dynamite gun of the best make and latest improvements. It was also marked 'S. Cape Haytien.'

Fifty cases of cartridges are also on the dock addressed to the same party. The cases each contain 1,000 cartridges.

== 1889: Shipping money ==
An article in The New York Times reported that Ozama carried $300,000 in paper money to Haiti in March 1889. The paper money brought in by the Ozama was not for her own use, but it was cargo, and said to be the first of $1,000,000 meant to replace a previous issue of paper money. The money was probably being replaced because it had been issued by the prior regime, or because it had been devalued due to inflation and/or counterfeiting. Mercenaries (called Filibusters) who were supporting the overthrow of a government would not have accepted paper money because it could become worthless simply with the change of regime. The same article mentioned that the Legitime government had paid $80,000 in gold for the wood hulled steamship Carondelet, which they hoped to convert to a warship. Gold was then approximately $20 an ounce, so $80,000 in gold would have been approximately 4,000 ounces.

The loss of the Ozama coincided with the discovery of a plot to overthrow Haitian president Hippolyte. The president's son-in-law was implicated and was ordered to be shot but escaped. Attachés of the German legation and prominent officials are also said to be parties to the plot. The outbreak of the revolution, which had been considered imminent for some time, partly due to Hippolyte's poor health, was expected daily so the time was certainly ripe for the smuggling of both guns and money.

== 1889: Seizure for smuggling ==
Ozama, which had been openly involved in weapons smuggling on prior trips, was seized by the Haitians who returned her only after the American man-of-war Ossipee, Captain Kellogg, threatened to shell Port-au-Prince. The Ozama's indignant captain claimed she was totally innocent. Her capture and the circumstances of her release resulted in an international incident. Haiti ended up paying $7,500 for the "unlawful" seizure, and the State of Illinois passed a resolution honoring Captain Kellogg.

== 1894: Wrecked at Cape Romain, South Carolina ==
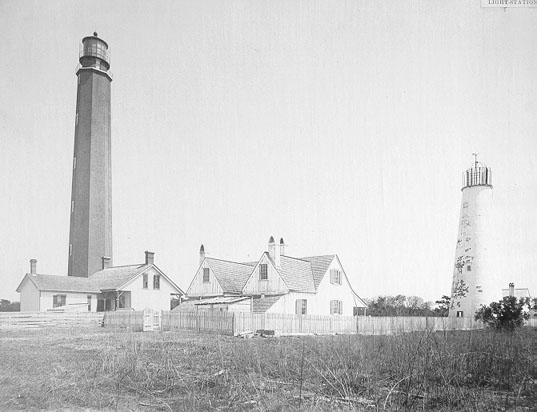
Cape Romain Lighthouses

On 23 November 1894, the tug W.B. Congdon picked up off the Georgetown Bar Captain Bennington and twelve men of the steamer Ozama, bound from Philadelphia to Charleston in ballast. Captain Bennington reported that the Ozama struck on Cape Romain shoals and stove a hole in the engine room compartment. The water quickly filled the fire rooms, rendering the engines useless. The steamer floated off the shoals soon after striking, and at 3 a.m. sank in six and one half fathoms of water, the Cape Romain light "bearing Northwest by West, half West, six miles distant." The crews took to the boats, saving only part of their clothing. The engineer with ten men went off to board the steamer Planter from Charleston but missed her and it was thought they landed on Romain beach. She was officially traveling in ballast, but because the death of Haiti's president was considered imminent, the timing was certainly right for her again carrying guns and/or a significant quantity of money for either shoring up the existing regime, or for financing an insurrection. Such money would have needed to be in gold, not paper.

== 2013: Discovery ==
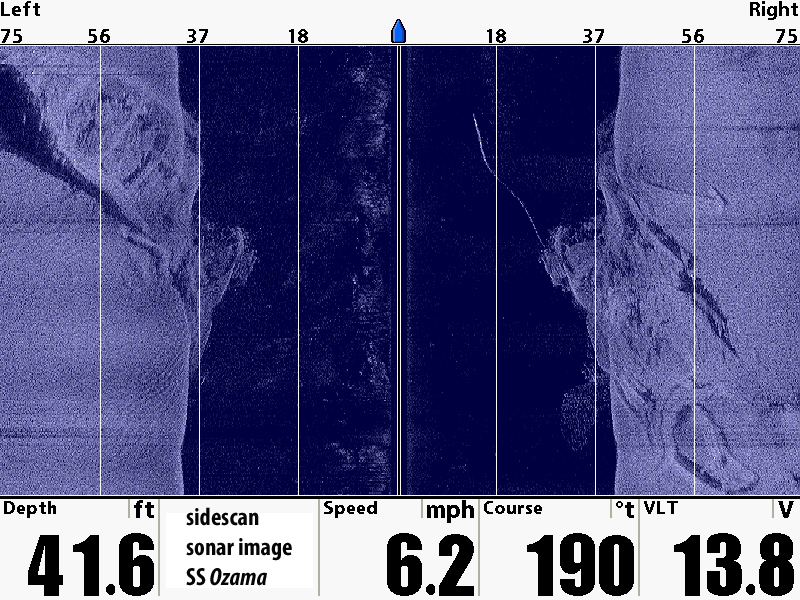
sonar image of Ozama

The wreck site was discovered in 40 feet of water off Cape Romain by underwater archaeologist Dr. E. Lee Spence in 1979. Spence identified the wreck in June 2013, as the Ozama through the engine type, length, width, type of decking, and other construction details.

According to Spence the wreck is "in surprisingly good condition with most of the ship relatively intact and sitting upright."
