= Ozama Department =

Former Department of the Dominican Republic

The Ozama department is a former French department which was located in the Spanish part of the island of Hispaniola (now the Dominican Republic) when it was under French domination during the Era de Francia, and during the Haitian occupation of Santo Domingo. Its capital was the city of Santo Domingo.

The Ozama Department comprised three districts: Santo Domingo, El Seibo, and Salvaleón de Higüey. The geographical boundaries of the Ozama Department following Dominican independence and the reestablishment of departments were defined as the Haitian border, the Cordillera Central, and the sea coast of the country. It was the southernmost department in the Dominican Republic.

== History ==
On July 13, 1801, the Law on Territorial Partition was passed by Toussaint Louverture's Constitutional Assembly, dividing the island into six departments; in the eastern part of the island, these were the Ozama and Cibao Departments. Each department was subdivided into districts, which themselves were subdivided into parishes.

Following the 1804 establishment of the Empire of Haiti on Hispaniola, Emperor Jean-Jacques Dessalines divided the empire into "military divisions" instead of departments in 1805.

The concept of the territorial department returned in the Haitian Political Constitution of 1816; during the time of President Jean-Pierre Boyer, the Ozama and Cibao departments had returned as political subdivisions. Santo Domingo was made into its own district from 1809-1821, but returned to being a district (and later a canton) in the Ozama Department during the Haitian occupation of Santo Domingo from 1822 until the Dominican War of Independence in 1844.

Following the independence of the Dominican Republic, a new Constitution was proclaimed on November 6, 1844, which disestablished all of the departments, including the Ozama Department, and established the five provinces of Santo Domingo, El Seibo, La Vega, Azua and Santiago in their place. Departments were re-established, however, in the Law of Territorial Division passed on March 9, 1858, which divided the country into the Departments of Seybo, Ozama, and Cibao.

The 1861 Spanish annexation of the Dominican Republic brought with it more significant political reorganization; the Departments were disestablished again at this time and were not re-established. The Constitution of 1865 following independence provided for provinces but no departments.
