= Universidad Santo Tomás de Aquino =

Historic university in Santo Domingo, Dominican Republic

Coordinates: 18.4620°N 69.9170°W

Royal and Pontifical University of St. Thomas Aquinas
- Regia y Pontificia Universidad de Santo Thomás de Aquino
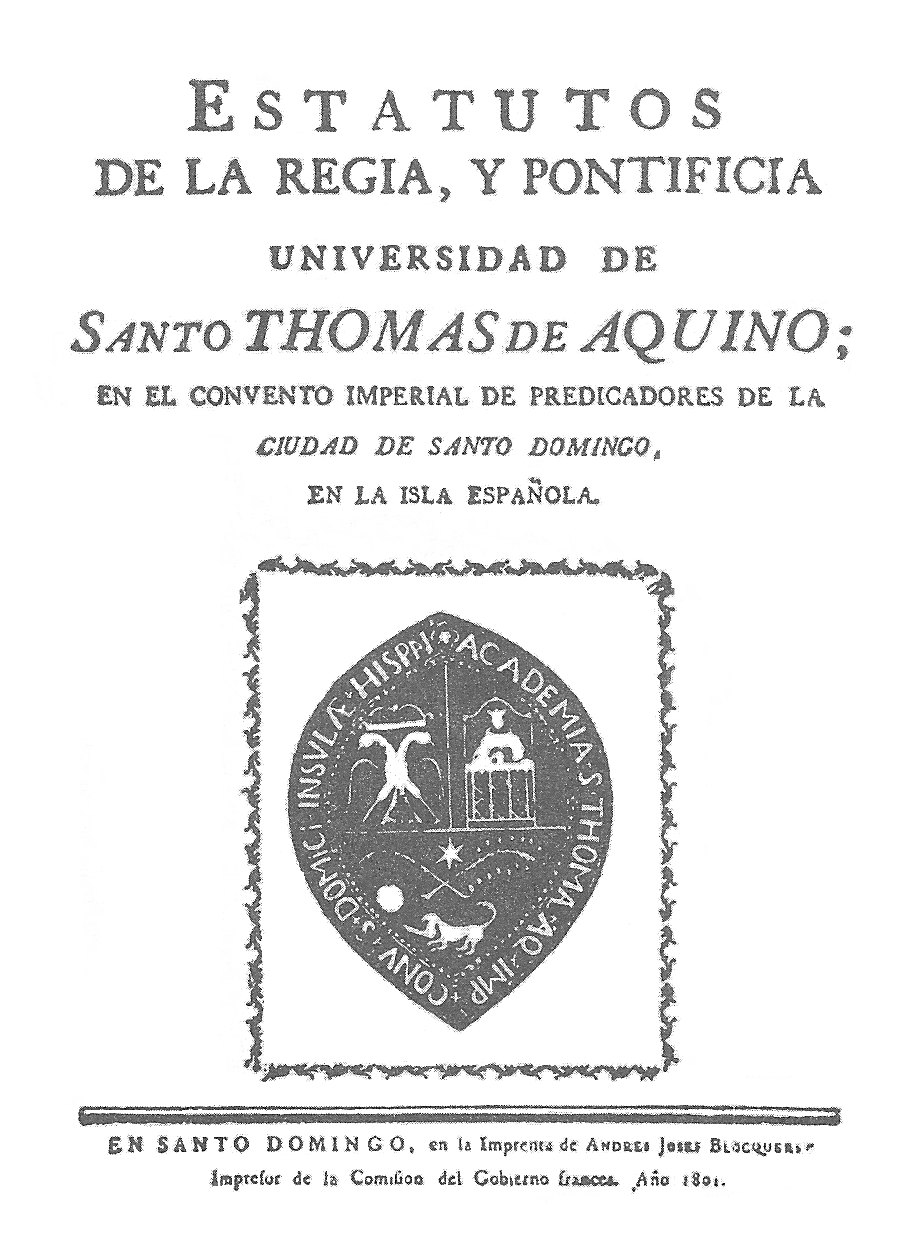
- Active: 1538–1823
- Founder: Pope Paul III
- Rector: Last: Bernardo Correa y Cidrón
- Location: Santo Domingo , Dominican Republic
- Language: Latin, Spanish

The University of St. Thomas Aquinas (Spanish: Universidad de Santo Tomás de Aquino) is, from a historical perspective, the first university founded in the Americas. It was established by the papal bull In Apostolatus Culmine, issued by Pope Paul III on October 28, 1538, at a time when royal approval through a "pase regio" was not yet required. It was later officially recognized by the Spanish Crown through a Royal Provision on February 23, 1558. Its main headquarters were located in the Church and Convent of the Dominicans.

The university has not operated continuously, as it suspended classes on several occasions due to wars that affected the island of Santo Domingo during the 19th century: it was closed during the Haitian occupation in 1801 and again in 1823. In 1914, the Dominican government reopened it under the name University of Santo Domingo, but it had to close once more between 1916 and 1924 due to the U.S. military occupation of the island. Later, in 1961, the institution was granted administrative autonomy to ensure independence from political control, adopting the name Universidad Autónoma de Santo Domingo (UASD), the oldest university in the Americas still in operation.

== History ==
Founded during the reign of Charles I of Spain, it was originally a seminary administered by Dominican friars. Later, the institution was elevated to the status of a university through the papal bull In Apostolatus Culmine, issued by Pope Paul III on October 28, 1538. However, it did not obtain official recognition from Charles V until 1558, through a Royal Provision. For this reason, there is debate about whether it should formally be considered the first university in the Americas. Many of the colonial universities claim primacy, arguing that the one in Santo Domingo lacked royal approval. The counterargument, however, is that such recognition was not necessary at the time of its foundation, since the pase regio was only instituted in 1539 (a year later), and therefore this requirement could not invalidate the functioning of the university, which had already been founded.

Prior to its conversion into a full university, the institution had been a Studium Generale (seminary), founded in 1518 and operated by the Dominican Order.

In its structure and purpose the new university was modeled after the University of Alcalá in the city of Henares, Spain. In this capacity it became a standard-bearer for the medieval ideology of the Spanish Conquest, and gained its royal charter in 1558. In this royal decree, the university was given the name University of Saint Thomas Aquinas (Universidad Santo Tomás de Aquino).

The university was closed in 1801 under the French, but reopened in 1815 as a secular institution. It closed again in 1823, during the Haitian occupation of Santo Domingo, when all students were ordered into military services.

In 1866, the government decreed the creation of the Professional Institute (Instituto Profesional), which operated as substitution of the defunct university. And on November 16, 1914, President Ramón Báez, decreed its transformation into the Universidad Autónoma de Santo Domingo, successor of the first one.

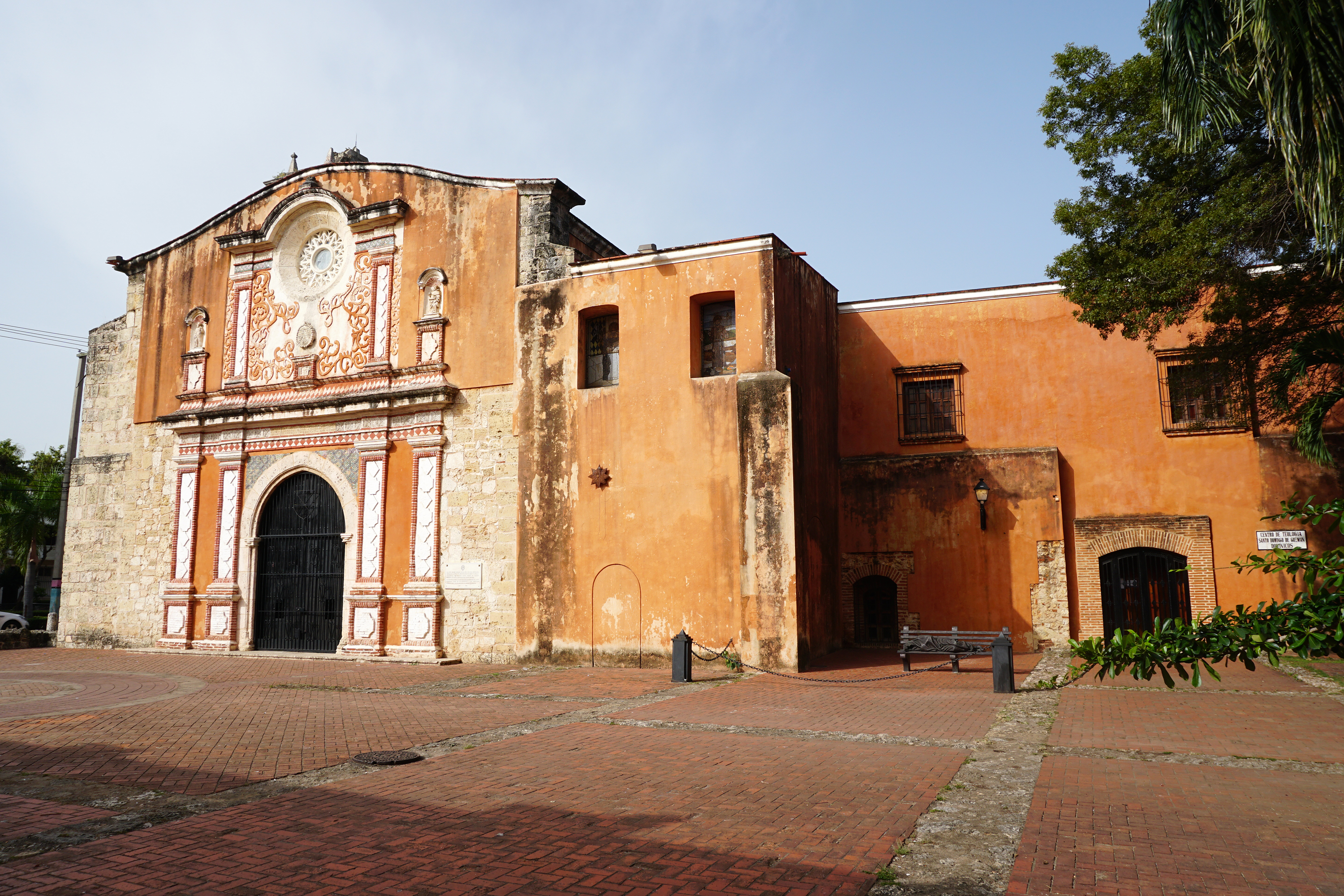
Facade of the historic Convent of the Dominicans in Santo Domingo (circa 1510), the original site of the first university campus in the New World.

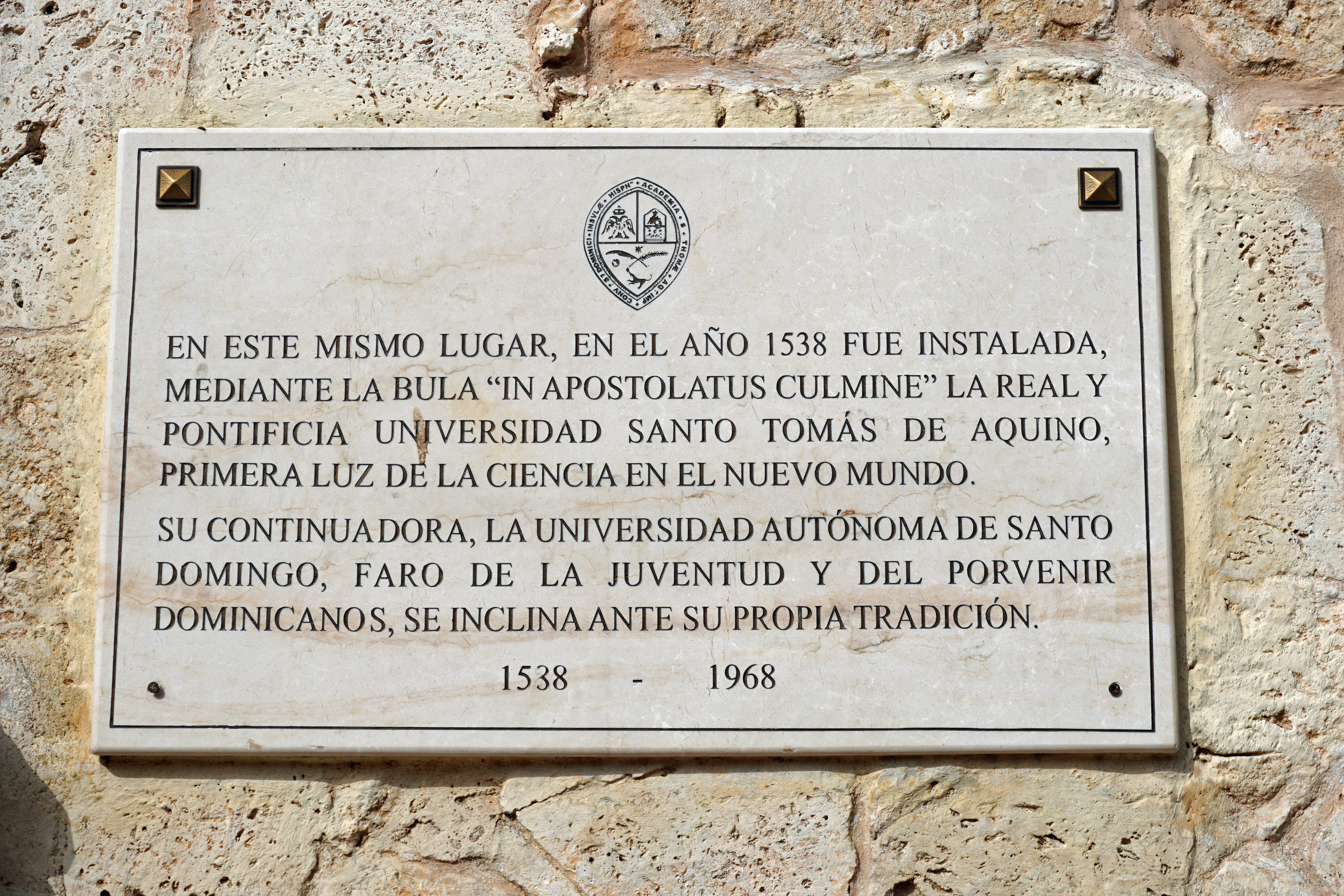
Commemorative plaque marking the creation of the University of St. Thomas Aquinas, located at the entrance of the Church of the Dominicans.

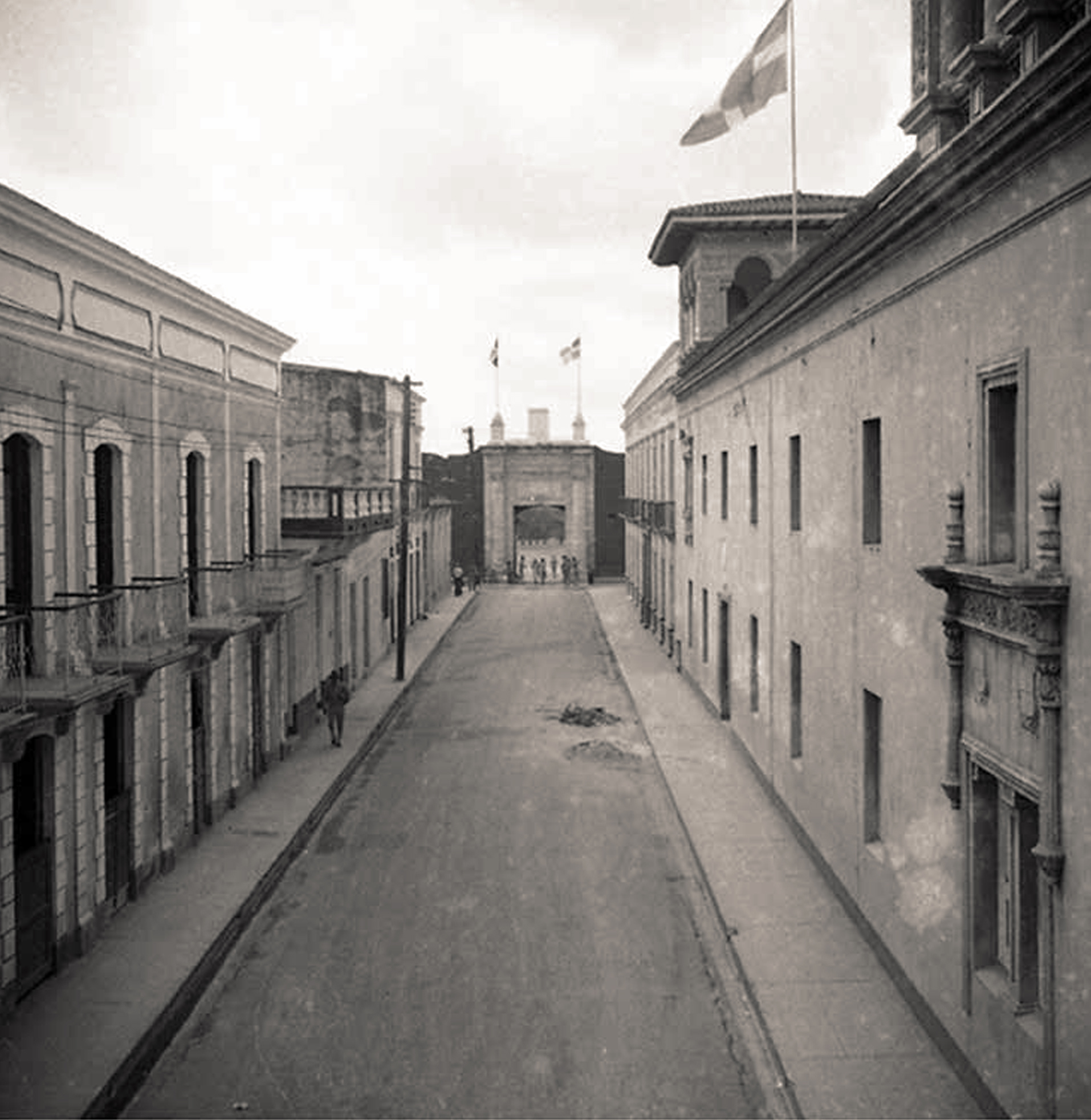
Lateral view of the University of Santo Domingo.

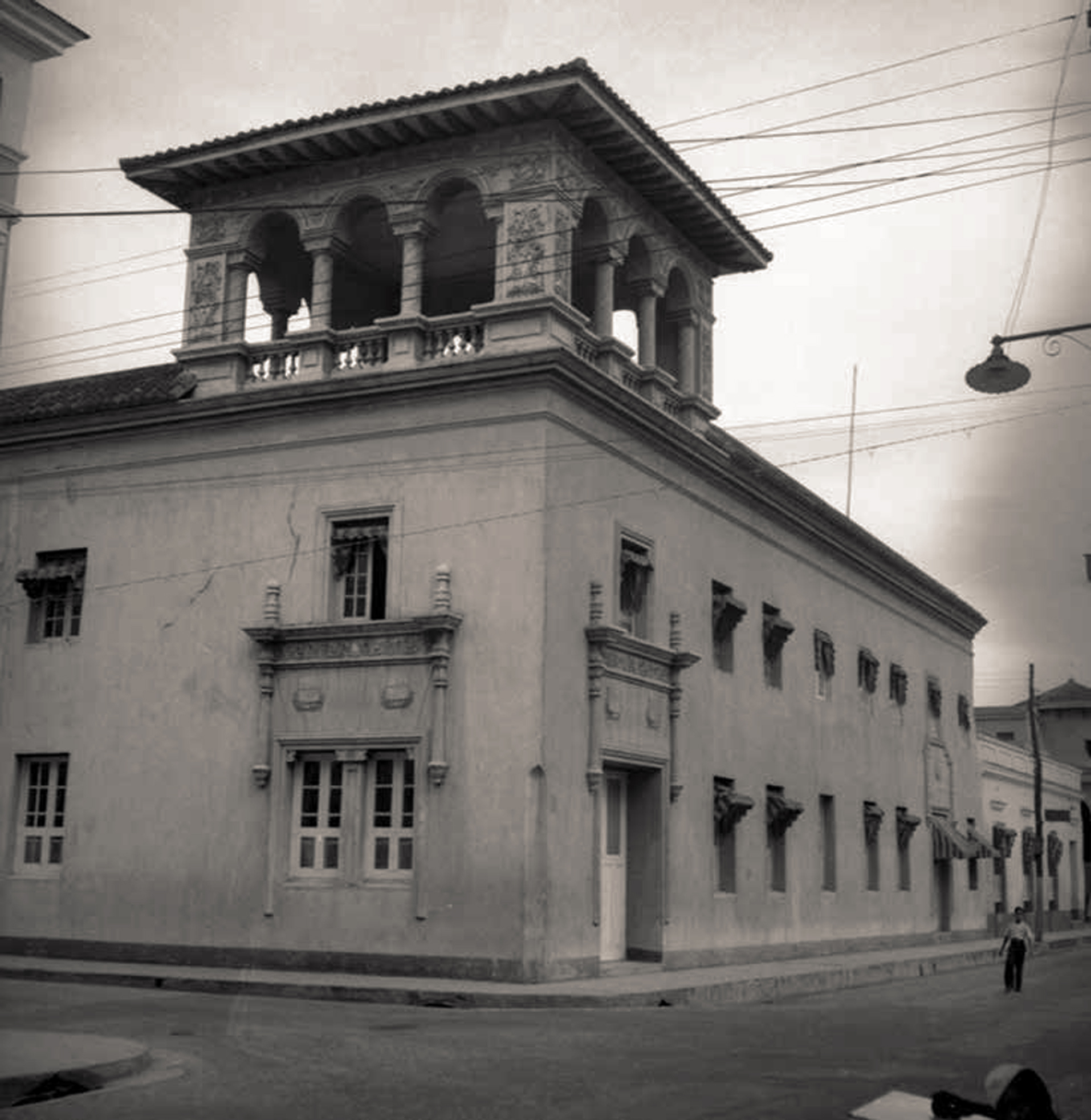
University of Santo Domingo, circa 1940.

== See also ==
- List of universities in the Dominican Republic
- List of colonial universities in Latin America
