= Haitian occupation of Santo Domingo =

Haitian rule in the Dominican Republic (1822–1844)

Republic of Haiti République d'Haïti (French) Repiblik d Ayiti (Haitian Creole) República de Haití (Spanish)
- 1822–1844
- Flag Coat of arms

- Status: Annexed to Haiti
- Capital: Santo Domingo
- Common languages: French (official); Haitian Creole; Spanish
- Demonym: Dominicans
- Government: Military occupation
- President
  - 1822–1843: Jean-Pierre Boyer
  - 1843–1844: Charles Rivière-Hérard
- History
  - Established: February 9, 1822
  - Dominican Declaration of Independence: January 16, 1844
  - Dominican War of Independence (end of occupation): February 27, 1844
- Currency: Gourde (HTG)
Preceded by	Succeeded by
Republic of Spanish Haiti	First Dominican Republic
- Today part of: Dominican Republic

The Haitian occupation of Santo Domingo (Note: "Santo Domingo" is the name under which what today constitutes the Dominican Republic was known during this period. "Dominican Republic" only began to be used as the most common name for the country in English in the early 20th century.) (Spanish: Ocupación haitiana de Santo Domingo; French: Occupation haïtienne de Saint-Domingue; Haitian Creole: Okipasyon ayisyen nan Sen Domeng) was the annexation and merger of then-independent Republic of Spanish Haiti (formerly Santo Domingo) into the Republic of Haiti, which lasted twenty-two years from February 9, 1822, to February 27, 1844. The part of Hispaniola under Spanish administration was first ceded to France and merged with the French colony of Saint Domingue as a result of the Peace of Basel in 1795. However, with the outbreak of the Haitian Revolution the French lost the western part of the island, while remaining in control of the eastern part of the island until the Spanish recaptured Santo Domingo in 1809.

Santo Domingo was regionally divided with many rival and competing provincial leaders. During this period, the Spanish crown had limited influence in the colony. Dominican military leaders had become rulers, where the "law of machete" governed the land. On November 9, 1821, the former captain general in charge of the colony, José Núñez de Cáceres, decided to overthrow the Spanish government and declared independence from Spain. Meanwhile the mulatto president of Haiti, Jean-Pierre Boyer, offered his support to the frontier governors, and thus they allowed him to enter the city of Santo Domingo with around 10,000 soldiers in February 1822 which led to the occupation.

After losing the support of the elites, President Boyer was ousted in 1843 and replaced by Charles Rivière-Hérard. Nationalist Dominican forces in eastern Hispaniola led by Juan Pablo Duarte seized control of Santo Domingo on 27 February 1844. The Haitian forces, unprepared for a significant uprising, surrendered to the Dominican rebels, effectively ending Haitian rule of eastern Hispaniola. In March Rivière-Hérard attempted to reimpose his authority but was unsuccessful. Rivière-Hérard was removed from office by the mulatto hierarchy on May 3, 1844.

== Background ==
By the late 18th century the island of Hispaniola had been divided into two European colonies: Saint-Domingue, in the west, governed by France; and Santo Domingo, governed by Spain, occupying the eastern two-thirds of Hispaniola. By the 1790s, large-scale rebellions erupted in the western portion of the island, spearheaded by men such as Toussaint Louverture and Jean-Jacques Dessalines which led to the eventual removal of the French and the independence of Haiti. Following the independence of Haiti, massive portions of the remaining French population were murdered. The eastern portion of the island was preparing itself for an eventual separation from Spain.

=== First unification under the French ===
During the second half of the eighteenth century, Saint-Domingue quickly developed into the most prosperous plantation colony of the New World. As a result of the sugar plantations of the French colony worked by African slaves; sugar had become an indispensable commodity in Europe. By contrast, Santo Domingo, the eastern side that had once been the headquarters of Spanish colonial power in the New World, had long fallen into decline. The economy was stalled, the land largely unexploited and used for subsistence agriculture and cattle ranching, and the population was much lower than in Saint-Domingue. The accounts by the Dominican essayist and politician José Núñez de Cáceres cite the Spanish colony's population at around 80,000, mainly composed of criollos, mulattos, freedmen, and a few black slaves. Saint-Domingue, on the other hand, was nearing a million slaves.

In the aftermath of the war between the new French Republic and Spain, the latter, by the Peace of Basel of July 22, 1795, ceded its two-thirds of the island to France in exchange for the evacuation of the province of Guipuzcoa occupied by the French since 1793. However, due to the near chaotic situation in Saint-Domingue resulting from uprisings by mulattos and freedmen since 1791, the expected armed opposition of the Spanish settlers of Santo Domingo who feared the abolition of slavery if the French were to take over, and under the belief that the British would seize Santo Domingo if the transfer was effected, the Committee of Public Safety decided to delay the occupation until such time as it had enough military and naval forces to take possession of the eastern part of the island. This was to occur in January 1801 when Toussaint Louverture, then still loyal to France, occupied Santo Domingo in the name of the French Republic. In 1804 the leader of the Haitian revolution, Jean-Jacques Dessalines, declared Haiti's independence. Independence did not come easily given the fact that Haiti had been France's most profitable colony.

Under Toussaint Louverture's government, slavery was abolished for the first time on the eastern portion of Hispaniola until the colony was ceded to France. While the French had lost their former colony of Saint-Domingue by 1804, the French commander of the former Spanish side had been able to repulse the attacks of Jean-Jacques Dessalines, but in 1808, the Dominicans, led by Juan Sánchez Ramírez, revolted and the following year, with the help of a Royal Navy squadron, ended French control of the city of Santo Domingo. Spanish rule was reestablished. However, this short period under which the whole of Hispaniola was de jure under French rule was to be the chief justification of the freed Haitians in their quest to reunite the island under their rule.

=== 1805: Haitian Forces Invasion ===
In February 1805, Haitian forces, under Jean-Jacques Dessalines, invaded from the southern route in opposition of French-led approved slave raiding. Unable to overpower the Spanish–French defense, and intimidated by the arrival of a French fleet in support of Borgella in Santo Domingo, the army of Dessalines along with Henri Christophe raided through the interior Dominican towns Santiago and Moca, while Alexandre Pétion invaded Azua. On his retreat from Santo Domingo, Dessalines arrived in Santiago on April 12, 1805. While in Santiago, Haitian forces set fire to the town, including churches and convents. The army killed approximately 400 inhabitants including some priests and took prisoners to Haiti. More people were killed on Dessalines' orders in the French-held portions of the island, including the towns of Monte Plata, Cotuí and La Vega and approximately 500 people of the northern town of Moca. The barrister Gaspar de Arredondo y Pichardo wrote, "40 [Dominican] children had their throats cut at the church in Moca, and the bodies found at the presbytery, which is the space that encircles the church's altar..." Survivors from the raids fled to eastern locations including Higüey through Cotuí as well as to other territories of the Spanish Antilles. Prisoners rounded up by the troops were forced to accompany the army back to Haiti, where, once they arrived, were either killed or forced to work on plantations. In total, over the course of a few weeks, nearly half of Santo Domingo's population were slaughtered by the Haitian soldiers.

Haitian rebel leaders encouraged fugitive African slaves to move into Hispaniola and they formed communities such as San Lorenzo de Los Mina, which is currently part of the "city" of Santo Domingo. Fugitives arrived from other parts of the West Indies as well, especially from the various islands of the Lesser Antilles.

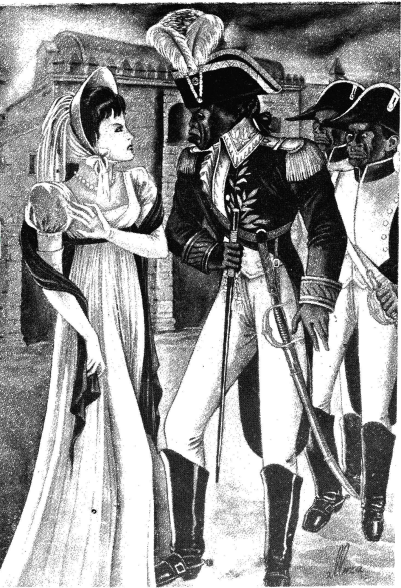
Haitians in Santo Domingo

Due to the political instability and volatile environment in the island, many of the wealthiest white families in Santo Domingo fled between 1795 and 1820. They settled in Venezuela, Puerto Rico, and Cuba resulting in a human capital flight. The white families who stayed on the island did not consider owning slaves due to the political crisis in the island but the few rich white elites that did, fled the colony. Many of these white families that stayed on the island settled in the Cibao region owning land. Historians state that "Santo Domingo lost most of its best families" at that era, specially during the slave revolts. Nevertheless, during the Dominican independence movement many whites returned back to the island to reclaim their territory.

=== 1806: Struggle to unite the South and North of Haiti ===
On October 17, 1806, Dessalines was assassinated, an act which was instigated by his own generals Henri Christophe and Alexandre Pétion. Afterward, both Christophe and Pétion failed to agree on who was going to be the next leader-for-life (a title created by Dessalines himself), so they went separate ways: Christophe took the North of Haiti (which he named Kingdom of Haiti), while Pétion got for himself the South part of Haiti (the newly created Republic of Haiti); and immediately they started a series of wars to take over the other's side. The internal military conflicts lasted until 1820 when Haitian president Jean-Pierre Boyer finally unified both the South and North of Haiti. After this, Boyer aimed his sights on the struggling Spanish-side of the island.

=== Spanish reconquest of Santo Domingo ===
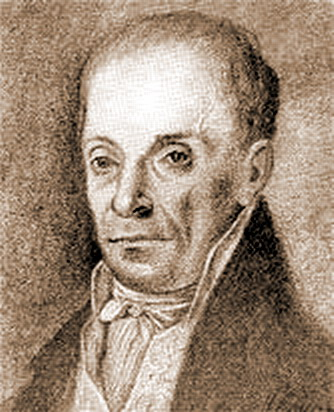
Portrait of Juan Sánchez Ramírez, painted in the early 19th century

Juan Sánchez Ramírez a Dominican general commanded the troops that fought against the French in Santo Domingo between 1808 and 1809 in the Battle of Palo Hincado, resulting in a victory against the French, and the return of Santo Domingo to Spanish governance.

Sánchez Ramírez, an agricultural landowner, had already fought against the French in the War of the Convention, and in 1803 he had emigrated to Puerto Rico, from where he returned in 1807 to foment the insurrection. To do this, he requested the help of the governor of Puerto Rico, Toribio Montes, and of Dominican settlers who had fled to that island, with whose forces he revolted against the French troops of general and governor Jean-Louis Ferrand, whom he defeated on July 11, 1808, in the battle of Palo Hincado.

Shortly after, with the help of the Royal Navy fleet that came to support him from the Colony of Jamaica, he managed to take the capital of the island. He was therefore appointed captain general and mayor of the island by the Junta of Seville, thereby reestablishing Spanish sovereignty. During his government he harshly repressed any independence attempt, acting with total impunity. Sanchez convened the board of Bondillo, which established new laws and declared the Treaty of Basel null and void. So the board confirmed the permanence of Santo Domingo in Spanish hands. Santo Domingo was declared Spanish by Ramírez in July 1809.

Under his government, Santo Domingo again traded with the allied countries to Spain, and the Universidad Santo Tomás de Aquino (UASD) was reopened.

He suspended the confiscations that the French government had executed against the colony. He also allowed the British to trade in the ports of Santo Domingo.

However, Ramirez established the slave system, which had been abolished by the Haitians, and the poor population grew in Santo Domingo. So several attempts coup d'état to expel to Sánchez Ramírez of the Santo Domingo's government took place. The people who rebelled against their government were executed by the army, which was at the service of Ramirez, or sent to Ceuta.

Ramírez also tried to restore the Dominican economy, but Spain was engaged in the war against the then South American colonies. His mismanagement led to the period known as España Boba (Foolish Spain), in which the Ramirez government punished all those who promoted or fought for the independence of the colony.

Ramírez was ill and died on February 11, 1811, at the age of fifty, while still ruling the colony, and was buried in the National Pantheon.

=== 1821: Independence from Spain ===
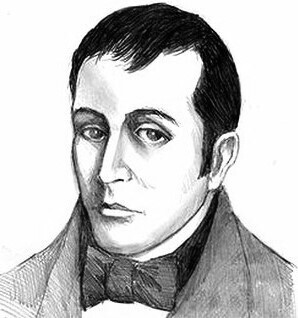
José Nuñez de Cáceres, the first and only governor of The Republic of Spanish Haiti from 1821 to 1822

On November 9, 1821, Spanish colonial rule over Santo Domingo was overthrown by a group led by José Núñez de Cáceres, the colony's former administrator, and the rebels proclaimed independence from the Spanish crown on December 1, 1821. The new nation was known as Republic of Spanish Haiti (Spanish: República del Haití Español), as Haiti had been the indigenous name of the island. On 1 December 1821 a constitutive act was ordered to petition the union of Spanish Haiti with Gran Colombia.

=== Prelude to the occupation ===
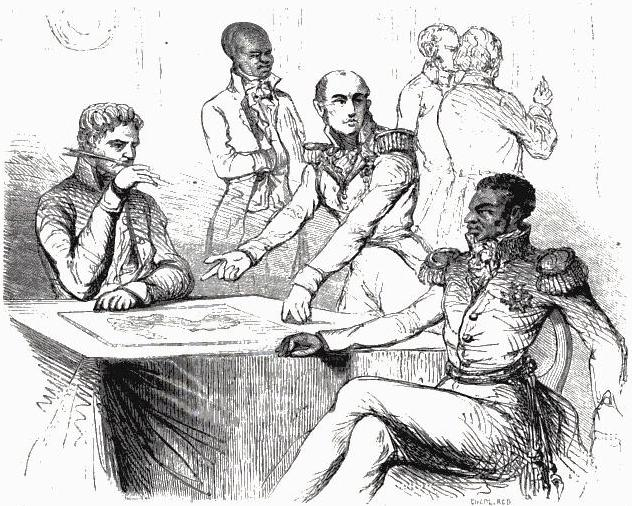
19th-century French print showing Mackau forcing Boyer to agree to pay 150 million francs to compensate French planters

A group of Dominican politicians and military officers in the frontier region favored uniting the newly independent nation with Haiti, as they sought political support from Haitian president Jean-Pierre Boyer against their enemies. A large faction based in the northern Cibao region were opposed to the union with Gran Colombia and also sided with Haiti. Boyer, on the other hand, had several objectives in the island that he proclaimed to be "one and indivisible": to maintain Haitian independence against potential French or Spanish attack or reconquest and to maintain the freedom of its former slaves.

While appeasing the Dominican frontier officers, Jean-Pierre Boyer was already in negotiations with France to prevent an attack by fourteen French warships stationed near Port-au-Prince, the Haitian capital. The Dominicans were unaware that Boyer made a concession to the French, and agreed to pay France 150 million gold francs destined to compensate the former French slave owners. Thus, Haiti would essentially be forced into paying reparations for its freedom.

Support of the unification found itself to be more popular among the Black population who believed that Boyers government would usher an era of social reform, including the abolition of slavery. In contrast, the white and multiracial populations, however, found themselves split on the idea of merging with the neighboring country. After deals with Bolivar fell through and receiving messages of economic and military support from Boyer, Caceres found himself more obliged to side with Creole Haiti. The idea had been gaining some traction among members of the military, and in 1821 Governor Sebastián Kindelán y Oregon discovered that some of the Dominican military officers in Azua and Santo Domingo had already become part of the plan for unification with Haiti. A defining moment took place on November 15, 1821, when the leaders of several Dominican frontier towns, particularly Dajabón and Montecristi, adopted the Haitian flag.

The Dominican nationalists who were against the unification of the island were at a serious disadvantage compared to the Haitian military, having at their disposal only an untrained infantry force. Haiti's population was eight to ten times larger than that of the Dominican population, and the Dominicans had to also contend with a severely underdeveloped economy. The Haitian military had been hardened after decades of conflict with European powers and rival political factions in Haiti, and memories of the numerous racial massacres of the Revolution were still fresh in the mind of Haitian troops, increasing their determination to never lose a battle.

== Occupation ==
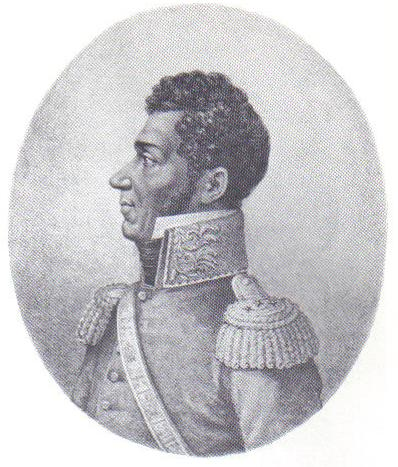
Jean-Pierre Boyer, the ruler of Haiti

After promising his full support to several Dominican frontier governors and securing their allegiance, Boyer ceremoniously marched into the country with 12,000 soldiers in February 1822, against a significantly smaller, untrained army serving some 70,000 Dominican souls (Haiti had a population around 600,000 people). On February 9, 1822, Boyer formally entered the capital city, Santo Domingo after its ephemeral independence. The island was thus united from "Cape Tiburon to Cape Samana in possession of one government." Upon unification of both French-side (Haitï) and Spanish-side (then Spanish Haiti) nations under the Haitian flag, Boyer divided the island into six departments, that were subdivided into arrondissements (administrative districts) and communes. The departments established in the west were Nord, Ouest, Sud, and Artibonite, while the east was divided into Ozama and Cibao. This period led to large-scale land expropriations and failed efforts to force production of export crops, impose military services, restrict the use of the Spanish language, and suppress traditional customs. There was also a resurgence of the decades-old rivalries between the governing Haitian elite (mulattoes) and the masses of the black population, most notably throughout the western end.

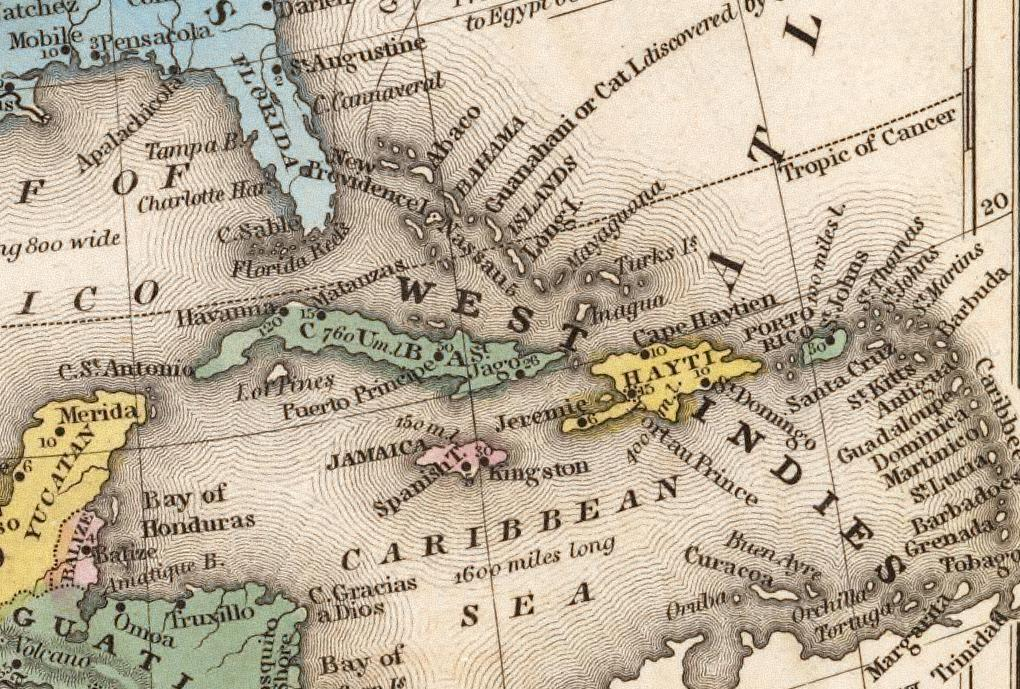
Map of the island of Hispaniola (1839)

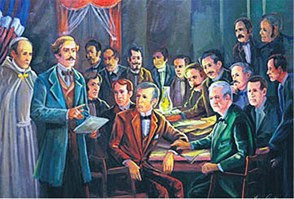
La Trinitaria meeting

To raise funds for the huge indemnity of 150 million francs that Haiti agreed to pay the former French colonists, and which was subsequently lowered to 60 million francs, the Haitian government imposed heavy taxes on the Dominicans. Since Haiti was unable to adequately provision its army, the occupying forces largely survived by commandeering or confiscating food and supplies at gunpoint. Attempts to redistribute land conflicted with the system of communal land tenure (terrenos comuneros), which had arisen with the ranching economy, and some people resented being forced to grow cash crops under Boyer and Joseph Balthazar Inginac's Code Rural instituted in 1838. In the rural and rugged mountainous areas, the Haitian administration was usually too inefficient to enforce its own laws. It was in the city of Santo Domingo that the effects of the occupation were most acutely felt, and it was there that the movement for independence originated. Dominican citizens also had more rights than the Haitians who were under Jean-Pierre Boyer's code rural, and often functioned as their own overseers.

Haiti's constitution also forbade white elites from owning land, and the major landowning families were forcibly deprived of their properties. Many emigrated to Cuba, Puerto Rico (these two being Spanish possessions at the time) or Gran Colombia, usually with the encouragement of Haitian officials, who acquired their lands. The Haitians, who associated the Catholic Church with the French slave-masters who had exploited them before independence, confiscated all church property, deported all foreign clergy, and severed the ties of the remaining clergy to the Vatican. Santo Domingo's university, the oldest in the Western Hemisphere, lacking both students and teachers had to close down, and thus the country suffered from a massive case of human capital flight.

Although the occupation instated a constitution modeled after the United States Constitution throughout the island, and led to the abolition of slavery as an institution in what became known as the Dominican Republic, forms of slavery persisted in Haitian society.

After the annexation of the whole island by Haiti, United States' efforts headed by the American Colonization Society, to send formally enslaved Africans from the United States to Haiti was supported and embraced by the Haitian government in attempts to "blacken" the eastern Dominican side and make Haiti seem like a safe haven for black people. Various trips were made from the United States to Haiti, and in 1824, the largest trip to the Dominican side consisted of 6,000 enslaved Africans, went to Samana, creating the Samaná Americans. Black refugees who had been subjected to slavery in other foreign territories (including Puerto Rico and Martinique) escaped to Santo Domingo and successfully claimed freedom under Haitian law. They testified to local Dominican officials (who now worked for the Haitian government) that they had sought to travel to Santo Domingo because they viewed it as a "free country" after annexation by Haiti.

Several resolutions and written dispositions were expressly aimed at converting average Dominicans into second-class citizens as Boyer had done with the Haitian peasantry under the aforementioned Code Rural: restrictions of movement, prohibition to run for public office, night curfews, inability to travel in groups, banning of civilian organizations, and the indefinite closure of the state university (on the alleged grounds of its being a subversive organization) all led to the creation of movements advocating a forceful separation from Haiti with no compromises.

=== American black migration ===
Boyer was heavily involved with the massive migration of black Americans to the island in 1824. The American Colonization Society (ACS) noticed the recruitment effort. Concerned that free blacks could never assimilate to the United States, its members founded their society in 1816 to send American blacks to Africa and elsewhere. It was an uneasy collaboration between abolitionists and slaveholders, who approached the issue from differing viewpoints. The ACS planned colonization in what became Liberia for former slaves. In 1817 Loring D. Dewey toured the East Coast to recruit emigrants, starting in New York. The organization hoped to resettle 100,000 free blacks within 10 years. Haiti was recommended as the ideal black homeland, due to its moderate weather conditions and black government. After Dewey wrote to Boyer to determine if he was still interested in receiving American immigrants, Boyer proposed that Haiti would seek blacks exclusively from the United States.

The ACS sent Boyer questions related to its goal of a colony for American free blacks. Boyer was confident that his government would be able to receive these people. The ACS tried to negotiate to have the Haitian government pay transportation costs for the emigrants. Boyer responded that the government would pay for those who could not afford it, but the ACS would have to take care of the rest of the finances. Beginning in September 1824, nearly 6,000 Americans, mostly free blacks, migrated to the island within a year, with ships departing from New York, Baltimore and Philadelphia.

== Resistance and subsequent Independence ==
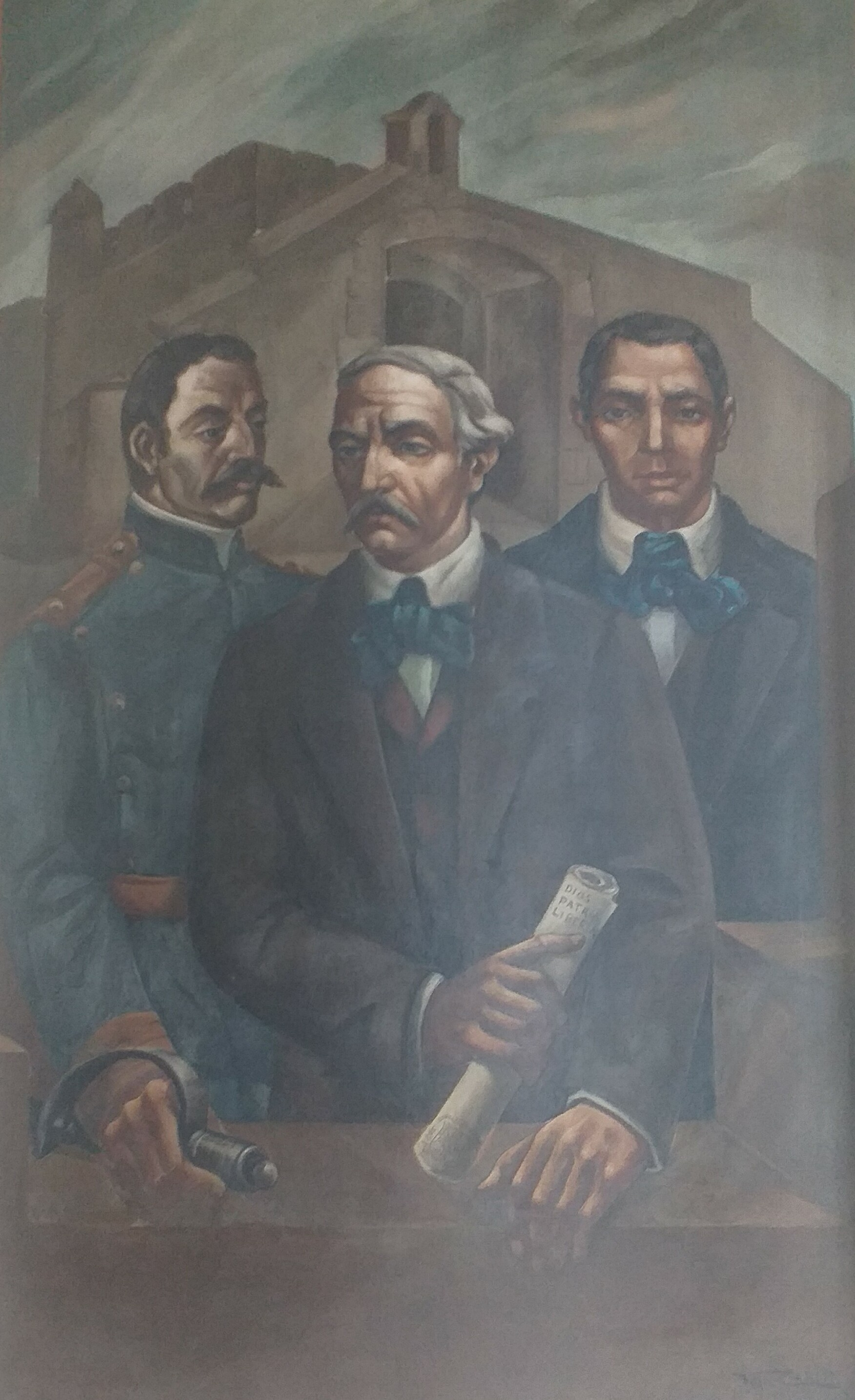
Matías Ramón Mella, Juan Pablo Duarte, and Francisco del Rosario Sánchez are remembered as the founding fathers of the Dominican Republic.

In 1838 a group of educated nationalists, among them, Matías Ramón Mella, Juan Pablo Duarte and Francisco del Rosario Sánchez founded a secret society called La Trinitaria to gain independence from Haiti. After they revealed themselves as revolutionaries working for Dominican independence, the new Haitian president, Charles Rivière-Hérard, exiled or imprisoned the leading Trinitarios. At the same time, Buenaventura Báez, an Azua mahogany exporter and deputy in the Haitian National Assembly, was negotiating with the French Consul-General for the establishment of a French protectorate.

In an uprising timed to preempt Báez, on February 27, 1844, the Trinitarios declared independence from Haiti, backed by Pedro Santana, a wealthy cattle-rancher from El Seibo who commanded a private army of peons who worked on his estates. This marked the beginning of the Dominican War of Independence.

== Aftermath and Dominican Independence (1844) ==
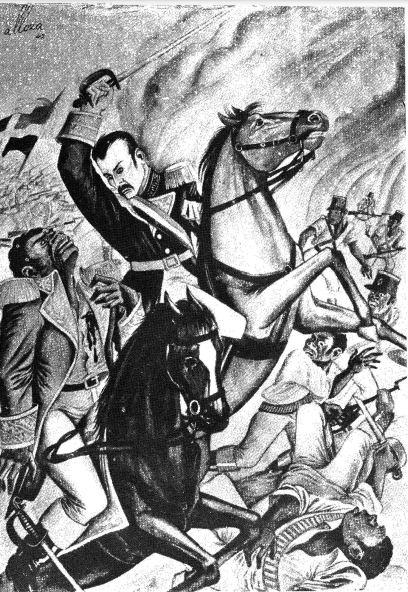
Depiction of Dominican general Jose M. Cabral in the battle of Santome

Santo Domingo attained independence as the Dominican Republic in 1844. Dominican nationalists led an insurrection against the Haitians. On the morning of 27 February 1844, the gates of Santo Domingo rang with the shots of the plotters, who had emerged from their meetings to openly challenge the Haitians. Their efforts were successful, and for the next ten years, Dominican military strongmen fought to preserve their country's independence from the Haitian government. After ousting the Haitian occupying force from the country, Dominican nationalists fought against a series of attempted Haitian invasions that served to consolidate their independence from 1844 to 1856. Under the command of Faustin Soulouque Haitian soldiers tried to gain back control of lost territory, but this effort was to no avail as the Dominicans would go on to decisively win every battle henceforth. In March 1844, a 30,000-strong two-pronged attack by Haitians was successfully repelled by an under-equipped Dominican army under the command of the wealthy rancher Gen. Pedro Santana. Four years later, Dominican fleets attacked Haitian towns, and land reinforcements in the south to force the determined Haitian leader to concede. In the most thorough and intense encounter of all, Dominicans armed with swords sent Haitian troops into flight on all three fronts in 1855.

== Territorial disputes ==
Neighboring towns and cities like Hincha (now Hinche), Juana Méndez (now Ouanaminthe), San Rafael de La Angostura (now Saint-Raphaël), San Miguel de la Atalaya (now Saint-Michel-de-l'Atalaye), Las Caobas (now Lascahobas), and Veladero (now Belladère), among others, remained isolated with little communication with the Dominican capital while there were a growing Haitian influence, as the gourde circulated and in addition to the Spanish language, Haitian Creole was also spoken; eventually becoming Haitian territories; however, these cities would often be disputed between the two countries. The boundary was finally set in 1929, and demarcated in 1935–1936.

== Governors ==
- Jérôme-Maximilien Borgella (9 February 1822 – 1832)
- Bernard-Philippe-Alexis Carrié (1832 – February 1843)
- Charles Rivière-Hérard (1843)
- Léo Hérard (1843 – 27 February 1844)

== See also ==
- Dominican War of Independence
- Haitian Revolution
- History of the Dominican Republic
- History of Haiti
