= List of Santo Domingo Metro stations =

This is a list of Santo Domingo Metro stations, excluding those that are abandoned, projected, planned, or under construction.

Line	Name	Transfer	Opened
Line 1	Mamá Tingó		22 January 2009
Line 1	Gregorio Urbano Gilbert		22 January 2009
Line 1	Gregorio Luperón		22 January 2009
Line 1	José Francisco Peña Gómez		22 January 2009
Line 1	Hermanas Mirabal		22 January 2009
Line 1	Máximo Gómez		22 January 2009
Line 1	Los Taínos		22 January 2009
Line 1	Pedro Livio Cedeño		22 January 2009
Line 1	Manuel Arturo Peña Batlle		22 January 2009
Line 1	Juan Pablo Duarte	Line 2	22 January 2009
Line 1	Juan Bosch		22 January 2009
Line 1	Casandra Damirón		29 January 2009
Line 1	Joaquín Balaguer		22 January 2009
Line 1	Amín Abel		22 January 2009
Line 1	Francisco Alberto Caamaño		22 January 2009
Line 1	Centro de los Héroes		22 January 2009
Line 2	Pablo Adón Guzmán		25 February 2026
Line 2	Freddy Gatón Arce		25 February 2026
Line 2	27 de Febrero		25 February 2026
Line 2	Franklin Mieses Burgos		25 February 2026
Line 2	Pedro Martínez		25 February 2026
Line 2	María Montez		1 April 2013
Line 2	Pedro Francisco Bonó		1 April 2013
Line 2	Francisco Gregorio Billini		1 April 2013
Line 2	Ulises Francisco Espaillat		1 April 2013
Line 2	Pedro Mir		1 April 2013
Line 2	Freddy Beras Goico		1 April 2013
Line 2	Juan Ulises García Saleta		1 April 2013
Line 2	Juan Pablo Duarte	Line 1	1 April 2013
Line 2	Colonel Rafael Tomás Fernández		1 April 2013
Line 2	Mauricio Báez		1 April 2013
Line 2	Ramón Cáceres		1 April 2013
Line 2	Horacio Vásquez		1 April 2013
Line 2	Manuel de Jesús Galván		1 April 2013
Line 2	Eduardo Brito		1 April 2013
Line 2	Ercilia Pepin		9 August 2018
Line 2	Rosa Duarte		9 August 2018
Line 2	Trina de Moya de Vasquez		9 August 2018
Line 2	Concepción Bona		9 August 2018
