= Estadio Olímpico Félix Sánchez =

Multi-purpose stadium in Santo Domingo, Dominican Republic

- El Olímpico (The Olympic); Estadio Olímpico (Olympic Stadium); El Félix Sánchez (The Félix Sánchez)
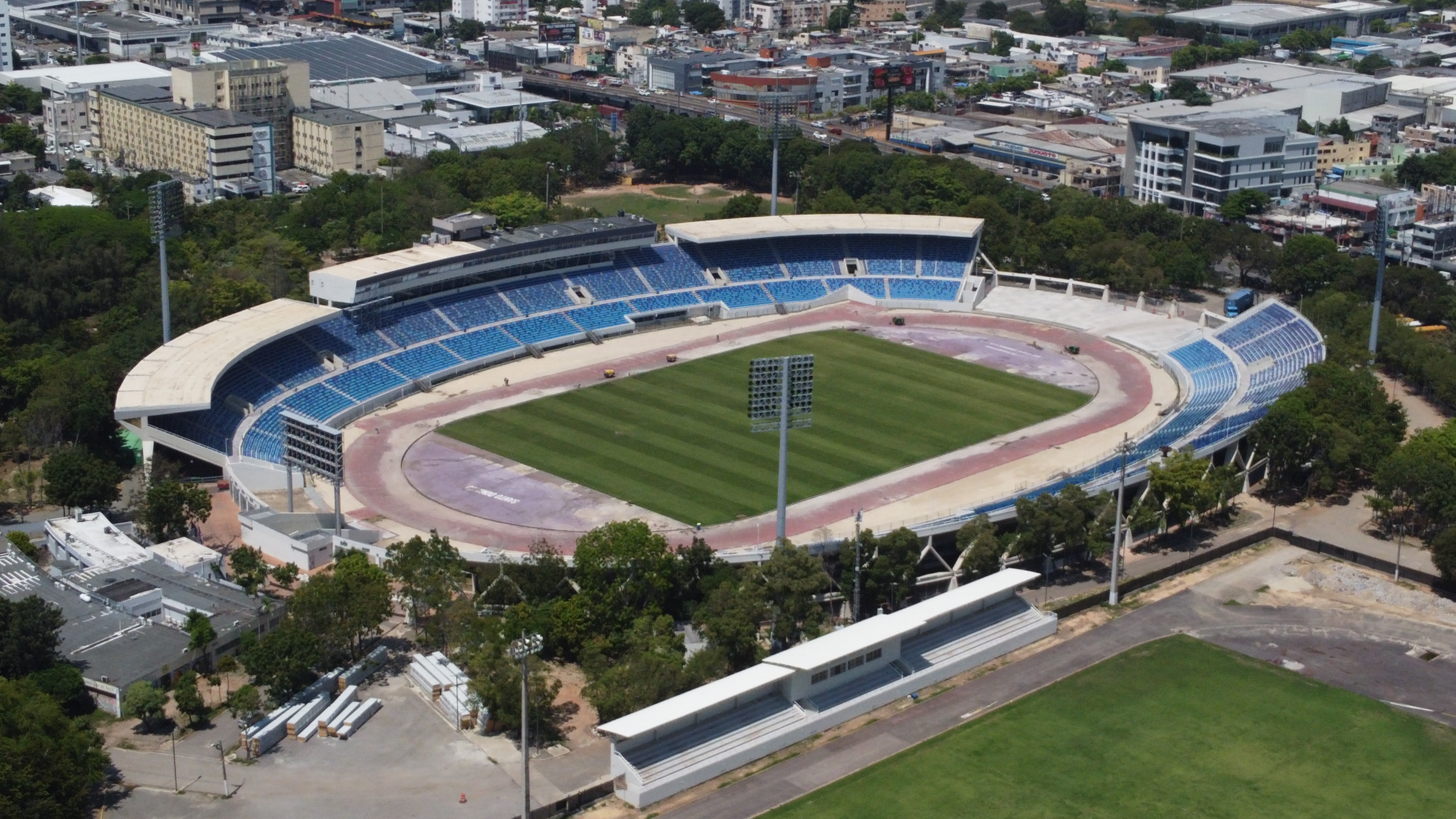
- Aerial view of the stadium (2025)
- Interactive map of Estadio Olímpico Félix Sánchez
- Full name: Estadio Olímpico Félix Sánchez
- Former names: Estadio Olímpico Juan Pablo Duarte (1974–2005) (official name); Estadio Olímpico Jaime "Capejón" Díaz (1974–2005)
- Address: Avenida Máximo Gómez
- Location: Centro Olímpico Juan Pablo Duarte, Santo Domingo, Distrito Nacional, 10122, Dominican Republic
- Coordinates: 18.480136°N 69.919481°W
- Owner: Dominican state
- Operator: Ministry of Sports and Recreation (MIDEREC)
- Seating type: General seating; VIP seating; presidential box
- Capacity: 24,863 (Football & Track and field); 50,000+ (Concerts)
- Surface: Artificial turf
- Scoreboard: Digital (LED)
- Screen: 1
- Acreage: 40,218 m² (433,123 square feet)
- Public transit: Santo Domingo Metro: at Juan Ulises Garcia station at Juan Pablo Duarte station at Juan Bosch station OMSA Bus: C30 (Estadio Olímpico); Public Bus: 13B, 54, 63, 64, 77

Construction
- Opened: February 1974
- Renovated: 1974, 2003, 2010, 2022–2023, 2024–2026
- Cost: RD$20 million (Note: Cost of the Centro Olímpico Juan Pablo Duarte.) (≈ RD$8.020 billion in July 2025)
- Project manager: Juan Ulises García Saleta "Wiche"

Tenants
- Bauger FC (LDF) (1974–2017); Atlético Pantoja (LDF) (1999–present); Dominican Republic men's national football team (1974–present) & (selected matches); O&M FC (LDF) (1974–present); Club Barcelona Atlético (LDF) (2007–2014, 2016–2017)

Estadio Olímpico Félix Sánchez (English: Félix Sánchez Olympic Stadium) is an open-air multi-purpose stadium in Santo Domingo, Dominican Republic. Opened in 1974 for the XII Central American & Caribbean Games and renovated for the 2003 Pan American Games, it is the largest stadium in the Dominican Republic. It is used mostly for football and track and field and as a music venue. The stadium has a sporting events' capacity of 24,863 people, though it has seen crowds of 35,000. For concerts, its stated capacity is 50,000 people.

It was formerly known as Estadio Olímpico Juan Pablo Duarte, because of the sports complex where it is located (Centro Olímpico Juan Pablo Duarte), However, in 2005 it was named after the 400 m hurdles athlete Félix Sánchez after he won the gold medal at the 2004 Summer Olympics in Athens.

It served as home of the Dominican football teams O&M FC and Atlético Pantoja and is of one of three stadiums to have served as home of the Dominican Republic men's national football team.

== History ==
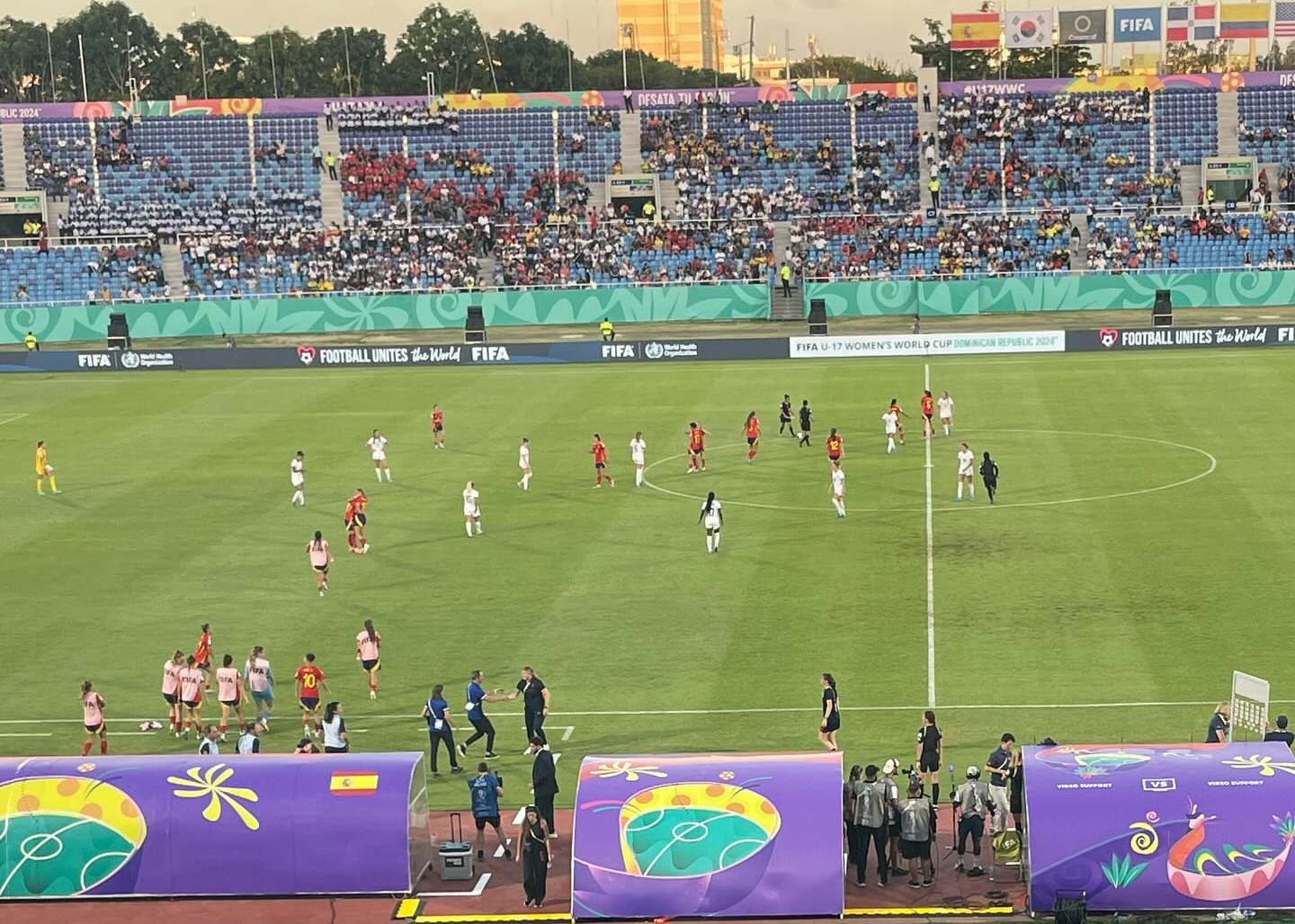
The stadium during the 2024 FIFA U-17 Women's World Cup

In February 1966, the construction of the Juan Pablo Duarte Olympic complex was begun in time to host the XII Central American & Caribbean Games. Concluded in February 1974, the stadium was inaugurated with the name of Juan Pablo Duarte Stadium named after the founding father. It had a capacity of 22,000. The stadium hosted the track & field events of the XII Central American & Caribbean Games between 27 February and 13 March 1974.

Between the 1980s and 1990s the stadium served as host for several events including concerts and religion celebration. In 1997, the stadium served as venue of the first edition of the Latin Music Festival sponsored by the Dominican beer Presidente, Festival Presidente de la Musica Latina. The music festival was a commercial success, inviting several international pop stars. The music festival returned in 1998, 1999, 2001, 2003, 2005, 2010, 2014, 2017 & 2026.

It was renovated for the 2003 Pan American Games to host the track & field events and the opening and closing ceremonies. It was equipped with 24,000 fixed seats and areas for special guests, press, dressing rooms and a cafeteria. It was inaugurated on 23 July 2003, by the president Hipolito Mejia with a renovation cost of over US$6 million of dollars. In August 2004, the stadium hosted a friendly game between the Brazil men's football team and Haiti and it included the participation of football stars of Ronaldo and Ronaldinho. In May 2005, the name of the stadium was officially changed to Felix Sanchez Olympic Stadium honoring the 400 m hurdles athlete Félix Sánchez for winning a gold medal at the 2004 Summer Olympics in Athens. In 2012, he won another medal on the same category at the 2012 Summer Olympics in London.

During the 2000s and 2010s decades several international pop artists performed concerts at the stadium including Shakira, Coldplay, Daddy Yankee, Juan Luis Guerra, Luis Miguel, Ricardo Arjona, Maroon 5, and Britney Spears.

It served as a venue for matches of the 2024 FIFA U-17 Women's World Cup, including the final, and it hosted the opening ceremony and athletics competitions of the 2026 Central American and Caribbean Games.

== Events ==
Games/Band/Artist	Event/Tour	Date	Attendance
1974 Central American and Caribbean Games
Juan Luis Guerra	Visa Para Un Sueño	25 December 1990	
Luis Miguel	Aries Tour	23 April 1994	
Juan Luis Guerra	Forgarate Tour	10 June 1995	50,000/50,000
Festival Presidente de la Musica Latina 1997		20, 21 & 22 June 1997	120,000
Festival Presidente de la Musica Latina 1998		26, 27 & 28 June 1998	155,000
Festival Presidente de la Musica Latina 1999		3, 4 & 5 June 1999	(92,503/105,000)
Festival Presidente de la Musica Latina 2001		1, 2 & 3 June 2001	(131,200/131,200)
Festival Presidente de la Musica Latina 2003		17, 18 & 19 October 2003	55,000 (Last Show)
2003 Pan American Games
Festival Presidente de la Musica Latina 2005		14, 15 & 16 October 2005	150,000+ (Total)
Juan Luis Guerra	20 Años Tour	27 December 2005	50,000+
Shakira	Oral Fixation Tour	19 December 2006	50,000
Ricardo Arjona and Wisin & Yandel	El Concierto Claro	1 July 2007	
Luis Miguel	Cómplices Tour	12 November 2008	
Marcela Gándara	Mas que un Anehlo Tour	22 November 2008	
Juan Luis Guerra	La Travesia Tour	14 February 2009	50,000+
Tiësto		28 March 2009	
Ricardo Arjona	5to Piso Tour	30 May 2009	
Daddy Yankee, Don Omar, Gilberto Santa RosaIlegales and Hector Acosta	Idolos Latinos	3 October 2009	
Jonas Brothers	Jonas Brothers World Tour 2009	25 October 2009	25,000
The Killers	Day & Age World Tour	13 November 2009	
Crystal Lewis, Funky, Gadiel Espinoza and Nancy Amancio	Megafest Cristiano	14 November 2009	20,000+
Aventura	The Last Tour	12 February 2010	60,000
Festival Presidente de la Musica Latina 2010		27–29 August 2010	
Maroon 5		28 December 2010	
Shakira	The Sun Comes Out World Tour	30 March 2011	50,000
Enrique Iglesias & Tito el Bambino	Cierre del Verano Presidente 2011	2 September 2011	
Britney Spears	Femme Fatale Tour	8 December 2011	15,000
Marcela Gándara & Jesus Adrian Romero	El brillo de mis ojos	16 December 2011	
Juan Luis Guerra	A son de Guerra Tour	16 June 2012	42,000
Wisin & Yandel and Prince Royce	Verano Presidente	7 September 2012	45,000
Romeo Santos	The King Stays King Tour	15 & 22 December 2012	50,000+ (per show)
Justin Bieber	Believe Tour	22 October 2013	11,321 / 21,850
Jesus Adrian Romero		21 December 2013	15,000+
Festival Presidente de la Musica Latina 2014		3 October,4,5 2014	120,000 (Total)
Romeo Santos	Formula, Vol. 2 Tour	20 December 2014	60,000+ (record)
Festival Presidente de la Musica Latina 2017		3, 4 & 5 November 2017	120,000+ (Total)
Daddy Yankee	Tamo en Vivo Tour	16 December 2017	
Barbarela 2018		30 May 2018	25,000
Romeo Santos	Golden Tour	17 December 2018	50,000
Luis Miguel	Mexico por siempre tour	29 March 2019	20,000
Ozuna	Nibiru World Tour	16 February 2020	50,000
Aventura	Inmortal Stadium Tour	18 & 19 December 2021	80,000 (Total)
Coldplay	Music Of The Spheres World Tour	22 March 2022	33,000
El Alfa	La Leyenda Del Dembow Tour	16 July 2022	45,000
Marc Anthony	Viviendo tour	22 September 2022	15,000
Bad Bunny	World's Hottest Tour	21 & 22 October 2022	100,000 (Total)
Daddy Yankee	La Última Vuelta World Tour	12 November 2022	50,000
Monster Jam		26 November 2022	
Luis Miguel	Luis Miguel Tour 2023–24	18 January 2024	
Juan Luis Guerra	Entre Mar y Palmeras Tour	10 February 2024	50,000
2024 FIFA U-17 Women's World Cup
Bad Bunny	Debí Tirar Más Fotos World Tour	21 November 2025	
2026 Central American and Caribbean Games
Ramón Orlando	50 Años de Ramón Orlando y sus Amigos	23 September 2026	
Dominican Republic men's national football team vs Haiti men's national football team	2026–27 CONCACAF Nations League	2 October 2026	
Karol G	Viajando Por El Mundo Tour	9 April 2027	

== See also ==
- Arena Banreservas Virgilio Travieso Soto
- Centro Olímpico Juan Pablo Duarte
- Estadio Quisqueya Juan Marichal

== Sources ==
1. events
2. stadium data

Preceded by DY Patil Stadium; Navi Mumbai	FIFA U-17 Women's World Cup; Final Venue; 2024	Succeeded by Prince Moulay Abdellah Olympic Annex Stadium; Rabat
Preceded by Canad Inns Stadium; Winnipeg	Pan American Games; Opening and Closing Ceremonies; 2003	Succeeded by Estádio do Maracanã; Rio de Janeiro
Preceded by Estadio Jorge "El Mágico" González; San Salvador	Central American and Caribbean Games; Opening ceremony venue 2026	Succeeded by TBA
