= Franklin Mieses Burgos metro station =

Santo Domingo metro station

Franklin Mieses Burgos

General information
- Location: Santo Domingo; The Dominican Republic
- Coordinates: 18°29′47.9″N 69°59′28.0″W
- System: Santo Domingo Metro station
- Line: Line 2

History
- Opened: 25 February 2026

Services
Preceding station	Santo Domingo Metro	Following station
27 de Febrero toward María Montez	Line 2	Pedro Martínez toward Concepción Bona
Location

Franklin Mieses Burgos is a Santo Domingo Metro station on Line 2. It was open on 25 February 2026 as part of the western extension of Line 2 between María Montez and Pablo Adón Guzmán. The station is located between Pedro Martínez and 27 de Febrero.

This is an elevated station built next to Autopista Duarte, at its crossing with Avenida Monumental. It is named in honor of the poet Franklin Mieses Burgos.
