= José Francisco Peña Gómez metro station =

Santo Domingo metro station

José Francisco Peña Gómez
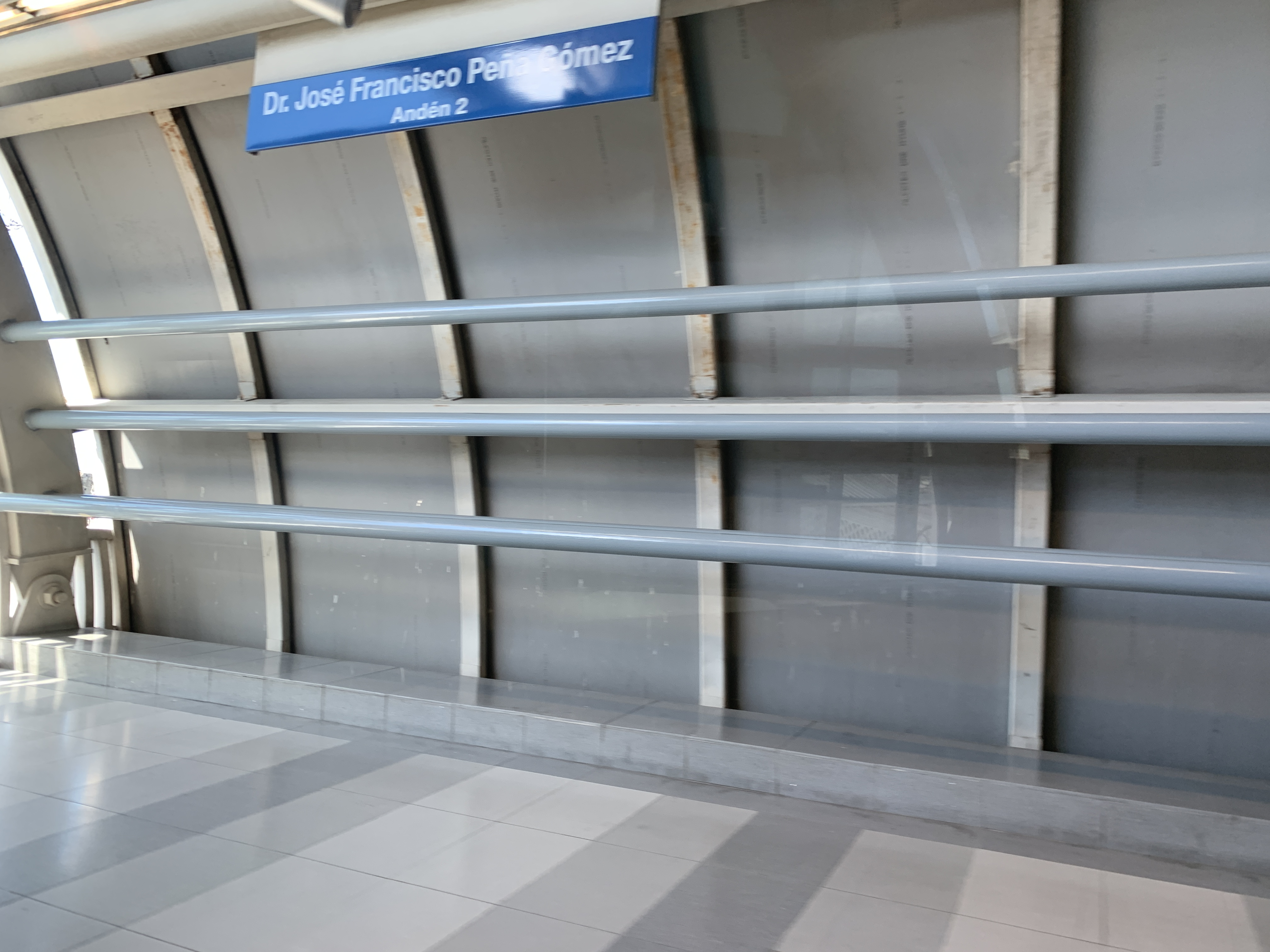

General information
- Location: Santo Domingo; The Dominican Republic
- Coordinates: 18°31′31″N 69°54′58.7″W
- System: Santo Domingo Metro station
- Line: Line 1

History
- Opened: 22 January 2009

Services
Preceding station	Santo Domingo Metro	Following station
Gregorio Luperón toward Mamá Tingó	Line 1	Hermanas Mirabal toward Centro de los Héroes
Location

José Francisco Peña Gómez is a Santo Domingo Metro station on Line 1. It was open on 22 January 2009 as part of the inaugural section of Line 1 between Mamá Tingó and Centro de los Héroes. The station is between Gregorio Luperón and Hermanas Mirabal.

This is an elevated station built above Avenida Hermanas Mirabal. It is named in honor of José Francisco Peña Gómez.
