= Joaquín Balaguer metro station =

Santo Domingo metro station

Joaquín Balaguer
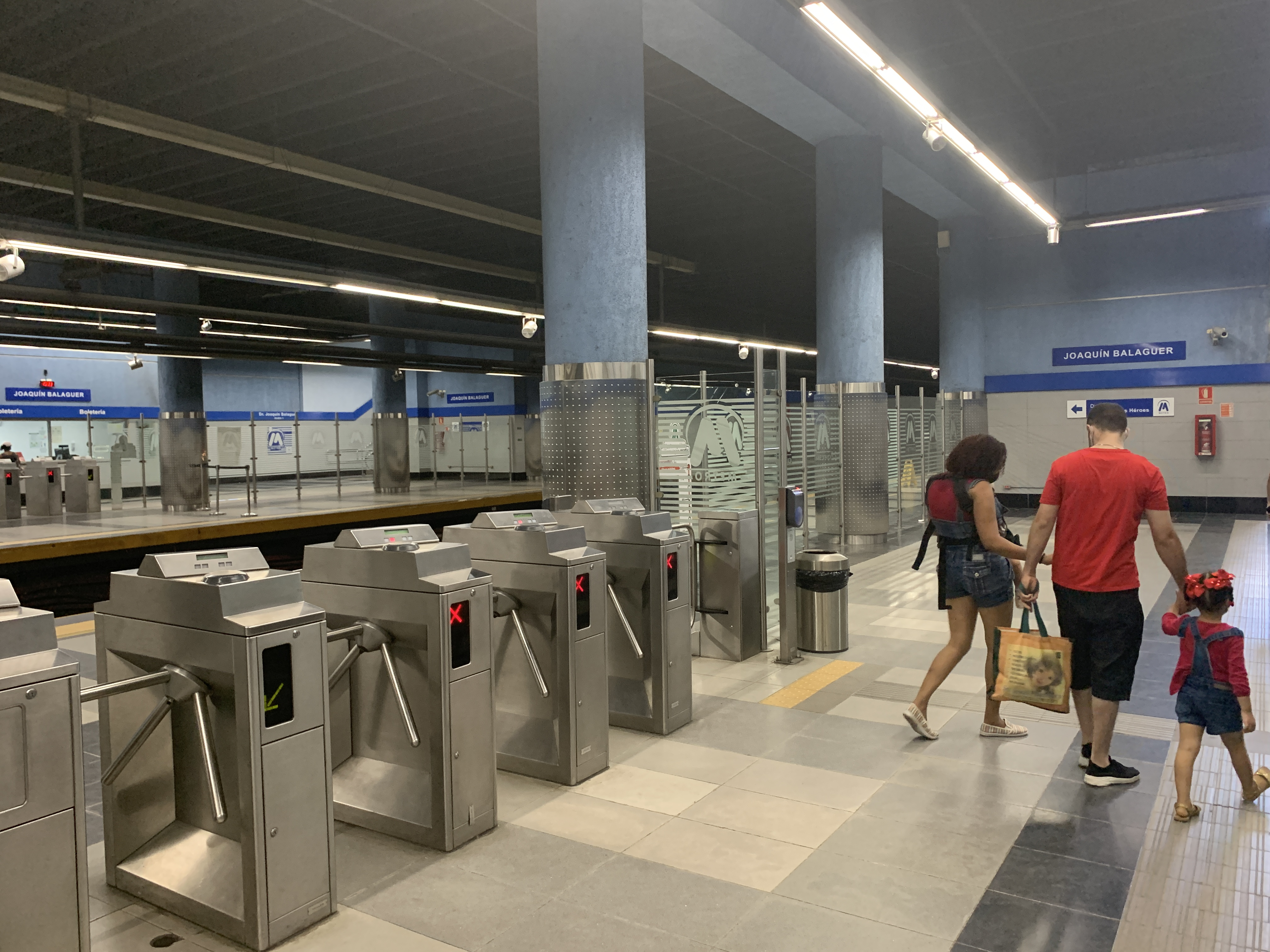

General information
- Location: Santo Domingo; The Dominican Republic
- Coordinates: 18°27′52.6″N 69°54′36″W
- System: Santo Domingo Metro station
- Line: Line 1

History
- Opened: 22 January 2009

Services
Preceding station	Santo Domingo Metro	Following station
Casandra Damirón toward Mamá Tingó	Line 1	Amín Abel toward Centro de los Héroes
Location

Joaquín Balaguer is a Santo Domingo Metro station on Line 1. It was open on 22 January 2009 as part of the inaugural section of Line 1 between Mamá Tingó and Centro de los Héroes. The station is between Casandra Damirón and Amín Abel.

This is an underground station, built below Avenida Máximo Gómez. It is named to honor Joaquín Balaguer, a former president of the Dominican Republic.
