= Mamá Tingó =

Dominican farmer activist leader

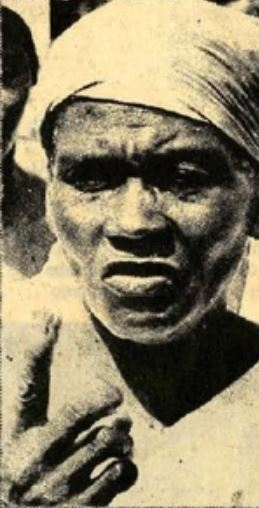
- Born: Florinda Muñoz Soriano; November 8, 1921; Villa Mella, Dominican Republic
- Died: November 1, 1974 (aged 52); Hato Viejo, Dominican Republic
- Occupation: Activist

Mamá Tingó (born Florinda Muñoz Soriano; November 8, 1921 – November 1, 1974) was a Dominican activist leader and defender of the rural farming community in the Dominican Republic. She was assassinated fighting against the unjust plunder of the resident farmers’ land in Hato Viejo in Yamasá during the second government under Joaquín Balaguer one of the presidents of the Dominican Republic.

== Biography ==
Mamá Tingó was born in Villa Mella, Dominican Republic, on November 8, 1921. She was the daughter of Eusebia Soriano and was baptized in the Parroquia Espíritu Santo, the Holy Spirit Church, in 1922. She married a farmworker named Felipe Muñoz at the age of 30. She worked on her farm for decades with her husband, until a landholder reclaimed her land. Although she was illiterate, it did not limit her and she fought for others like her who had lost their land.

In the beginning of 1974, the landholder Pablo Díaz Hernández reclaimed the lands that were occupied for more than half a century by the farmerworkers of Hato Viejo. Díaz Hernández claimed that he had bought the land. Mamá Tingó belonged to the Federation of Christian Agrarian Leagues and headed the fight to obtain benefits for the farmworkers of Hato Viejo, who believed they deserved them because they had occupied and worked the land for more than half a century. Despite her advanced age, she participated fiercely in directing the farmworkers movement.

== Death ==
The landholder Pablo Díaz Hernández enclosed 8,000 acres of land with barbed wire and uprooted the farmers’ crops. On November 1, 1974, the farmworkers of Hato Viejo appeared in front of the Tribunal of Monte Plata where the case was held, but the landholder Pablo Díaz did not attend the hearing. When Mamá Tingó returned to her farm, she discovered that the foreman Ernesto Díaz (Durín), employee of the landholder, had released her pigs. She went to gather them, but the foreman was hidden and took advantage of the moment and shot her with a shotgun. Mamá Tingó tried to defend herself with a machete, but two shots, one in the head and one to the chest, killed her. She died in Hato Viejo at 52 years old.

== Contributions, legacy, and honors ==
Member of the Federation of Christian Agrarian Leagues, through which she fought for the rights of the farmworkers. She won the rights of more than 300 families to own their lands.

She is considered a symbol of the fight for land and an example of a rural woman; because of this, one of the stations on the Santo Domingo Metro is named in her honor.

She was honored by the town council of Monte Plata with a statue that describes her work as an activist and fighter for the rights of agriculturalists.
