= Amín Abel metro station =

Santo Domingo metro station

Amín Abel
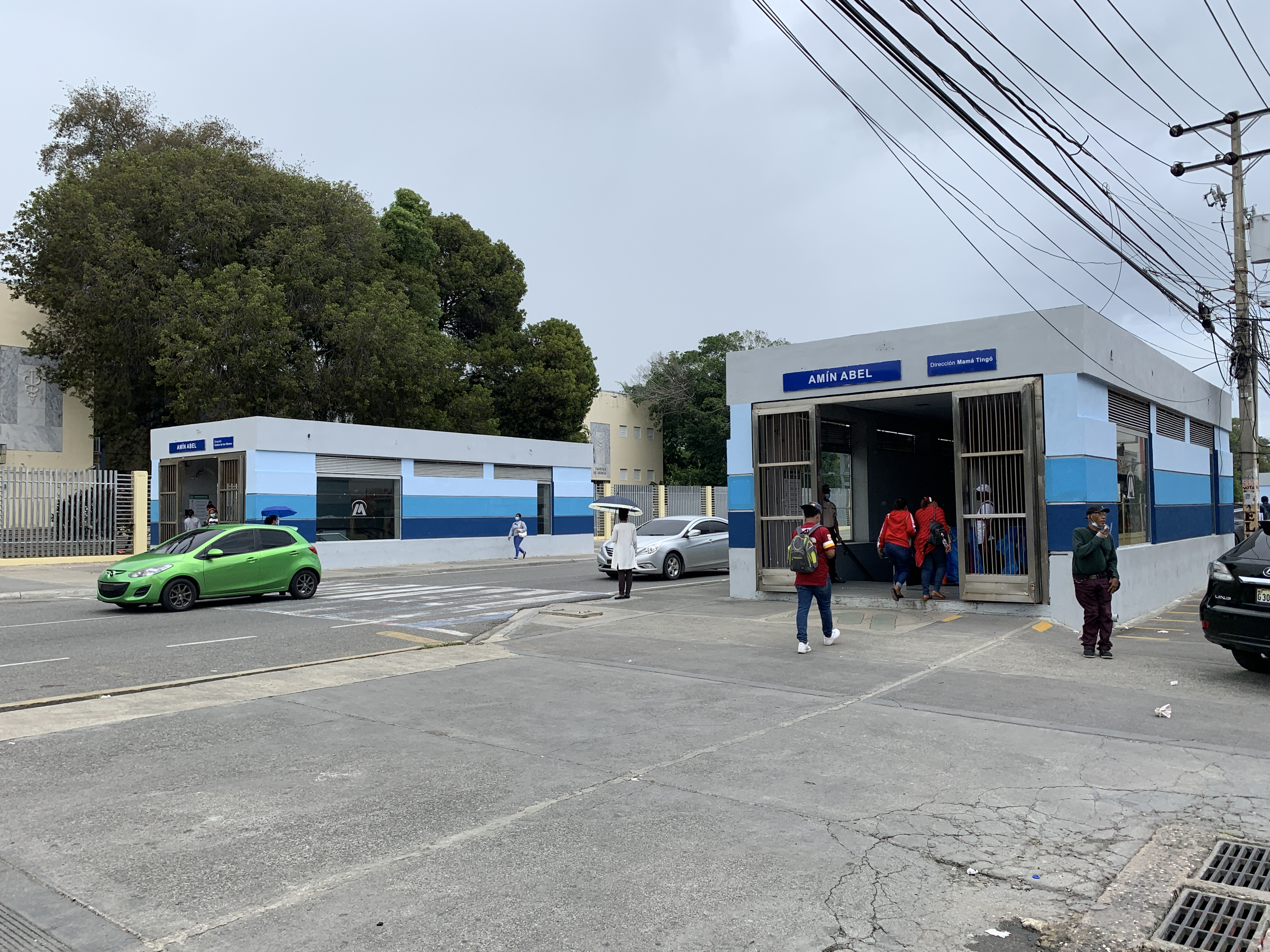

General information
- Location: Santo Domingo; The Dominican Republic
- Coordinates: 18°27′33.8″N 69°54′58.8″W
- System: Santo Domingo Metro station
- Line: Line 1

History
- Opened: 22 January 2009
- Former names: Universidad

Services
Preceding station	Santo Domingo Metro	Following station
Joaquín Balaguer toward Mamá Tingó	Line 1	Francisco Alberto Caamaño toward Centro de los Héroes
Location

Amín Abel is a Santo Domingo Metro station on Line 1. It was open on 22 January 2009 as part of the inaugural section of Line 1 between Mamá Tingó and Centro de los Héroes. The station is between Joaquín Balaguer and Francisco Alberto Caamaño.

This is an underground station, built below Avenida Dr. Bernardo Correa y Cidrón. It is named to honor Amín Abel Hasbún. The station is located at the University of Santo Domingo and was previously known as Universidad.
