= Casandra Damirón metro station =

Santo Domingo metro station

Casandra Damirón
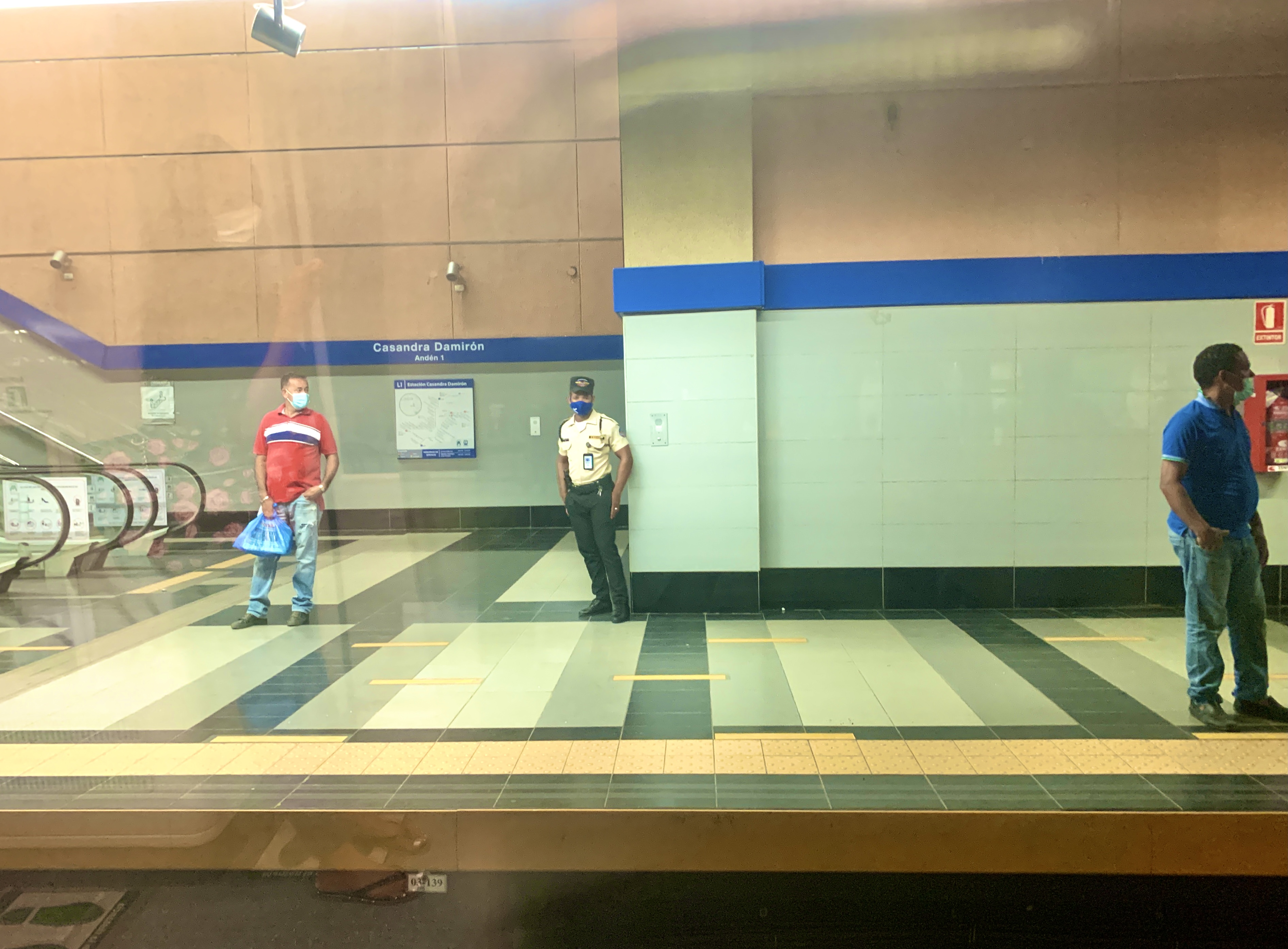

General information
- Location: Santo Domingo; The Dominican Republic
- Coordinates: 18°28′16.5″N 69°54′42.9″W
- System: Santo Domingo Metro station
- Line: Line 1

History
- Opened: 22 January 2009

Services
Preceding station	Santo Domingo Metro	Following station
Juan Bosch toward Mamá Tingó	Line 1	Joaquín Balaguer toward Centro de los Héroes
Location

Casandra Damirón is a Santo Domingo Metro station on Line 1. It was open on 22 January 2009 as part of the inaugural section of Line 1 between Mamá Tingó and Centro de los Héroes. The station is between Juan Bosch and Joaquín Balaguer.

This is an underground station, built below Avenida Máximo Gómez. It is named to honor Casandra Damirón.
