= Juan Pablo Duarte metro station =

Santo Domingo metro station

Juan Pablo Duarte
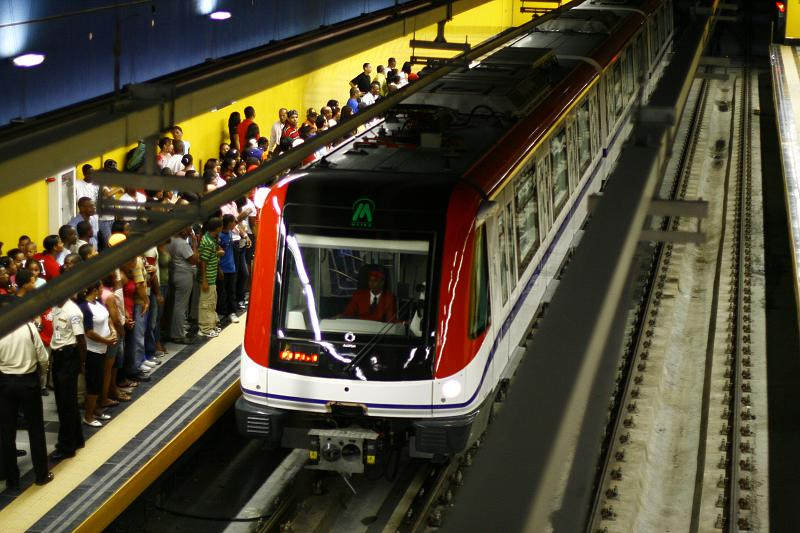

General information
- Location: Av. John F. Kennedy and Av. Máximo Gómez; Santo Domingo; Dominican Republic
- Coordinates: 18°28′52.4″N 69°54′52.2″W
- System: Santo Domingo Metro station
- Line: Line 1, Line 2

History
- Opened: 22 January 2009

Services
Preceding station	Santo Domingo Metro	Following station
Manuel Arturo Peña Batlle toward Mamá Tingó	Line 1	Juan Bosch toward Centro de los Héroes
Juan Ulises García Saleta toward María Montez	Line 2	Colonel Rafael Tomás Fernández toward Concepción Bona
Location

Juan Pablo Duarte is a Santo Domingo Metro interchange station on Lines 1 and 2. The Line 1 station was open on 22 January 2009 as part of the inaugural section of Line 1 between Mamá Tingó and Centro de los Héroes. The Line 2 station was open on 1 April 2013 as part of the inaugural section of Line 2 between María Montez and Eduardo Brito. The station is between Manuel Arturo Peña Batlle and Juan Bosch on Line 1, and between Juan Ulises García Saleta and Colonel Rafael Tomás Fernández on Line 2.

This is an underground station, built below the intersection of Avenida Máximo Gómez and Avenida John F. Kennedy. It is named to honor Juan Pablo Duarte.
