= Pedro Livio Cedeño metro station =

Santo Domingo metro station

Pedro Livio Cedeño
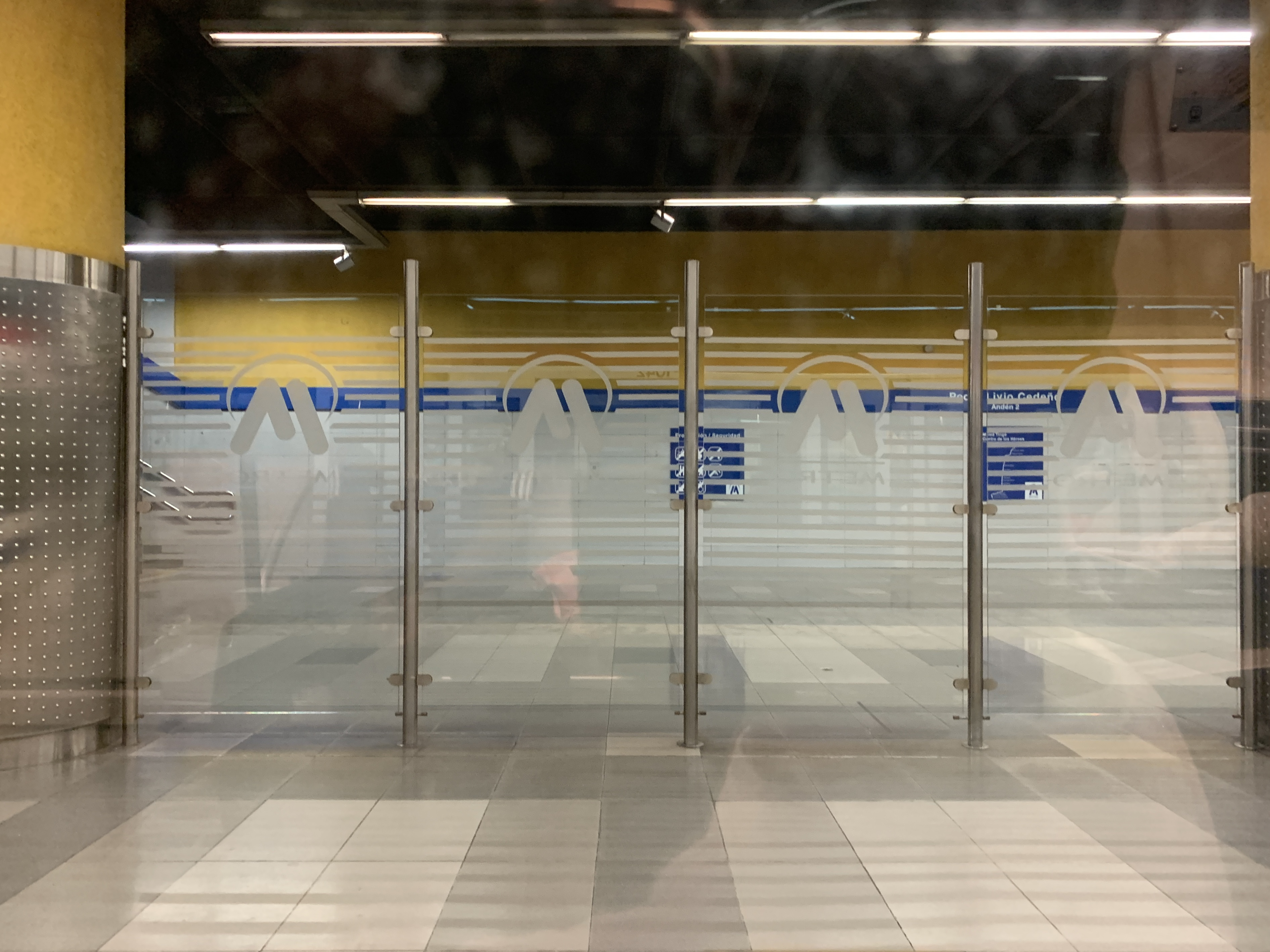

General information
- Location: Santo Domingo; The Dominican Republic
- Coordinates: 18°29′36.2″N 69°54′53.6″W
- System: Santo Domingo Metro station
- Line: Line 1

History
- Opened: 22 January 2009

Services
Preceding station	Santo Domingo Metro	Following station
Los Taínos toward Mamá Tingó	Line 1	Manuel Arturo Peña Batlle toward Centro de los Héroes
Location

Pedro Livio Cedeño is a Santo Domingo Metro station on Line 1. It was opened on 22 January 2009 as part of the inaugural section of Line 1 between Mamá Tingó and Centro de los Héroes. The station is between Los Taínos and Manuel Arturo Peña Batlle.

This is an underground station, built below Avenida Máximo Gómez. It is named to honor Pedro Livio Cedeño.
