= Julius Nwosu =

Nigerian basketball player (born 1971)

Personal information
- Born: January 5, 1971 (age 55) Nkwere, Nigeria
- Listed height: 6 ft 10 in (2.08 m)
- Listed weight: 255 lb (116 kg)

Career information
- High school: Imo State Secondary (Imo, Nigeria)
- College: Liberty (1989–1993)
- NBA draft: 1993: undrafted
- Playing career: 1993–2010
- Position: Center
- Number: 00

Career history
- 1993–1994: Cáceres CB
- 1994–1995: San Antonio Spurs
- 1995–1996: CSKA Moscow
- 1996–1997: Panathinaikos
- 1998: Galatasaray Cafe Crown
- 1998: Avtodor Saratov
- 2000–2001: Isuzu Giga Cats
- 2001: Élan Béarnais Pau-Orthez
- 2002: Red Bull Thunder
- 2002–2004: Sporting
- 2004–2005: Élan Béarnais Pau-Orthez
- 2005–2006: CSU Asesoft Ploieşti
- 2006–2007: Al Jalaa
- 2007–2008: Ararat
- 2008: Gregorio Urbano Gilbert
- 2008: Crocodrilos de Caracas
- 2008: Reales de La Vega
- 2009: Villa Duarte de Calero
- 2009: Juan Pablo Duarte
- 2009–2010: Gregorio Urbano Gilbert
- 2010: Jose Horacio Rodriguez
- 2010: San Carlos
- Stats at NBA.com
- Stats at Basketball Reference

Obinna Julius Nwosu (born May 1, 1971), is a Nigerian former professional basketball player. He played briefly for the National Basketball Association's San Antonio Spurs during the 1994–95 NBA season. He also had a career in the Lebanese Basketball League and the Philippine Basketball Association (PBA).

== Playing career ==
Born in Nkwere, Nigeria, Nwosu attended Liberty University in Lynchburg, Virginia. Nwosu has played in 14 different countries during his 14-year career.

He won the Russian league title in 1996 with CSKA Moscow, and the French league crown in 2001 with Pau-Orthez. Nwosu led the Red Bull Thunder to the PBA Commissioner's Cup title in 2002. In 2005, he started with Asesoft Ploiesti in Romania (averaging 12.8 points and 9.8 rebounds in FIBA Europe Cup), before signing with Syrian club Al Jalaa Aleppo in February 2006. He later played in the Dominican Republic.

He was part of the 1998 FIBA World Championship Nigerian national team that played at the FIBA World Championship. But due to bad medication bought at a market in Lagos, he was suspended for doping and could not finish the tournament.

== NBA career statistics ==
Legend
GP	Games played	GS	Games started	MPG	Minutes per game
FG%	Field goal percentage	3P%	3-point field goal percentage	FT%	Free throw percentage
RPG	Rebounds per game	APG	Assists per game	SPG	Steals per game
BPG	Blocks per game	PPG	Points per game	**Bold**	Career high

=== Regular season ===
Year	Team	GP	GS	MPG	FG%	3P%	FT%	RPG	APG	SPG	BPG	PPG
1994–95	San Antonio	23	0	3.7	.321	.000	.765	1.0	.1	.0	.1	1.3
Career		23	0	3.7	.321	.000	.765	1.0	.1	.0	.1	1.3

=== Playoffs ===
Year	Team	GP	GS	MPG	FG%	3P%	FT%	RPG	APG	SPG	BPG	PPG
1994–95	San Antonio	2	0	3.5	.000	.000	.000	1.0	.0	.0	.0	0.0
Career		2	0	3.5	.000	.000	.000	1.0	.0	.0	.0	0.0
