= 27 de Febrero metro station =

Santo Domingo metro station

27 de Febrero

General information
- Location: Santo Domingo; The Dominican Republic
- Coordinates: 18°30′9.5″N 69°59′58.0″W
- System: Santo Domingo Metro station
- Line: Line 2

History
- Opened: 25 February 2026

Services
Preceding station	Santo Domingo Metro	Following station
Freddy Gatón Arce toward María Montez	Line 2	Franklin Mieses Burgos toward Concepción Bona
Location

27 de Febrero is a Santo Domingo Metro station on Line 2. It was open on 25 February 2026 as part of the western extension of Line 2 between María Montez and Pablo Adón Guzmán. The station is located between Franklin Mieses Burgos and Freddy Gatón Arce.

This is an elevated station built next to Autopista Duarte, at its crossing with Avenida 27 de Febrero. It takes the name from the latter.
