= Manuel Arturo Peña Batlle metro station =

Santo Domingo metro station

Manuel Arturo Peña Batlle
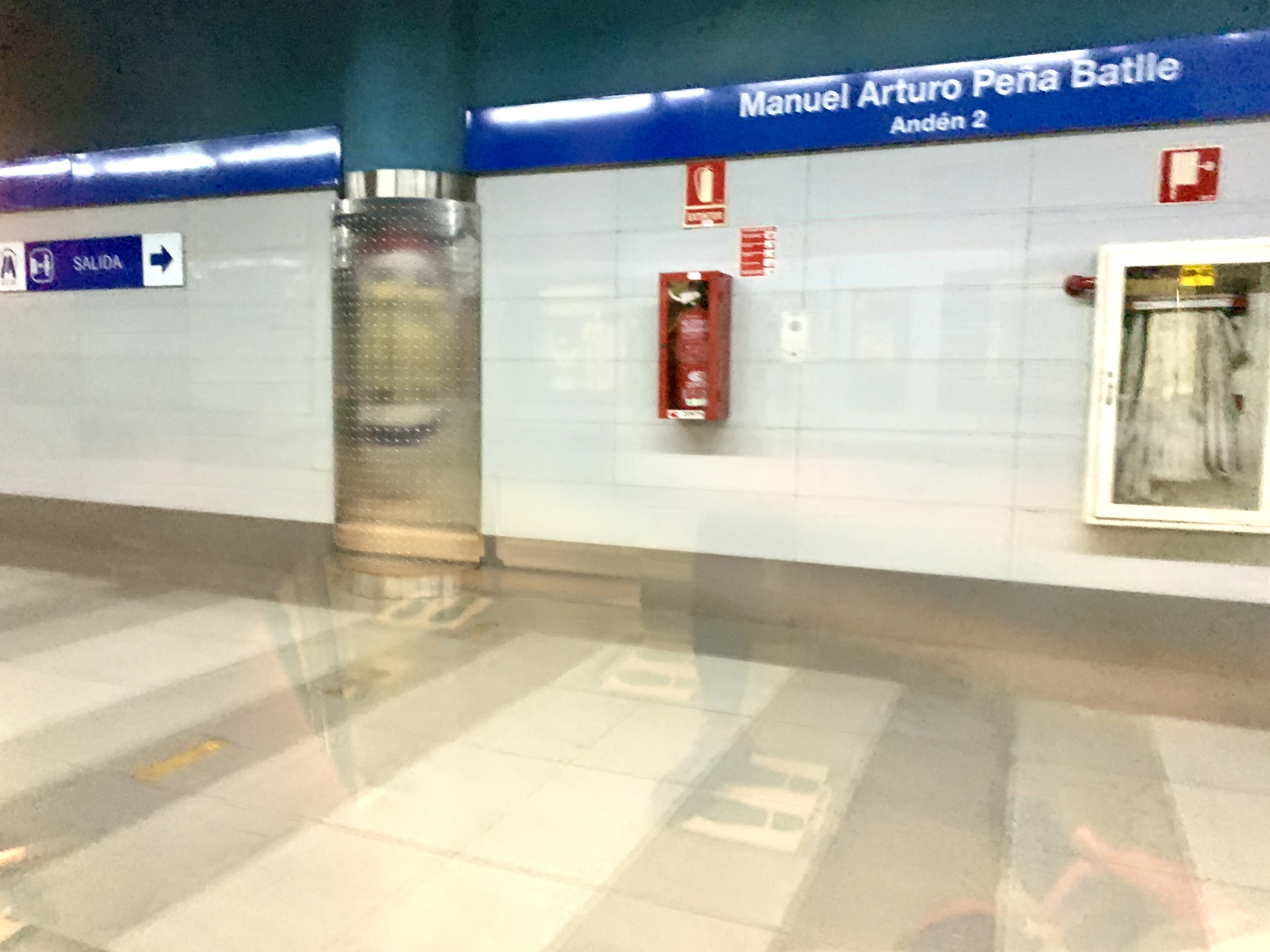

General information
- Location: Santo Domingo; The Dominican Republic
- Coordinates: 18°29′09.7″N 69°54′51.7″W
- System: Santo Domingo Metro station
- Line: Line 1

History
- Opened: 22 January 2009

Services
Preceding station	Santo Domingo Metro	Following station
Pedro Livio Cedeño toward Mamá Tingó	Line 1	Juan Pablo Duarte toward Centro de los Héroes
Location

Manuel Arturo Peña Batlle is a Santo Domingo Metro, Dominican Republic, station on Line 1. It was open on 22 January 2009 as part of the inaugural section of Line 1 between Mamá Tingó and Centro de los Héroes. The station is between Pedro Livio Cedeño and Juan Pablo Duarte.

This is an underground station, built below Avenida Máximo Gómez. It is named to honor Manuel Arturo Peña Batlle.
