= Hermanas Mirabal metro station =

Santo Domingo metro station

Hermanas Mirabal

General information
- Location: Santo Domingo; The Dominican Republic
- Coordinates: 18°31′05.1″N 69°54′54.2″W
- System: Santo Domingo Metro station
- Line: Line 1

History
- Opened: 22 January 2009

Services
Preceding station	Santo Domingo Metro	Following station
José Francisco Peña Gómez toward Mamá Tingó	Line 1	Máximo Gómez toward Centro de los Héroes
Location

Hermanas Mirabal is a Santo Domingo Metro station on Line 1. It was open on 22 January 2009 as part of the inaugural section of Line 1 between Mamá Tingó and Centro de los Héroes. The station is between José Francisco Peña Gómez and Máximo Gómez.

This is an elevated station built next to Avenida Hermanas Mirabal. It is named in honor of the Mirabal sisters.
