= Gregorio Luperón metro station =

Santo Domingo metro station

Gregorio Luperón

General information
- Location: Santo Domingo; The Dominican Republic
- Coordinates: 18°31′46.6″N 69°54′30.1″W
- System: Santo Domingo Metro station
- Line: Line 1

History
- Opened: 22 January 2009

Services
Preceding station	Santo Domingo Metro	Following station
Gregorio Urbano Gilbert toward Mamá Tingó	Line 1	José Francisco Peña Gómez toward Centro de los Héroes
Location

Gregorio Luperón is a Santo Domingo Metro station on Line 1. It was open on 22 January 2009 as part of the inaugural section of Line 1 between Mamá Tingó and Centro de los Héroes. The station is between Gregorio Urbano Gilbert and José Francisco Peña Gómez.

This is an elevated station built above Avenida Hermanas Mirabal. It is named in honor of the former president, Gregorio Luperón.
