= Los Taínos metro station =

Santo Domingo metro station

Los Taínos
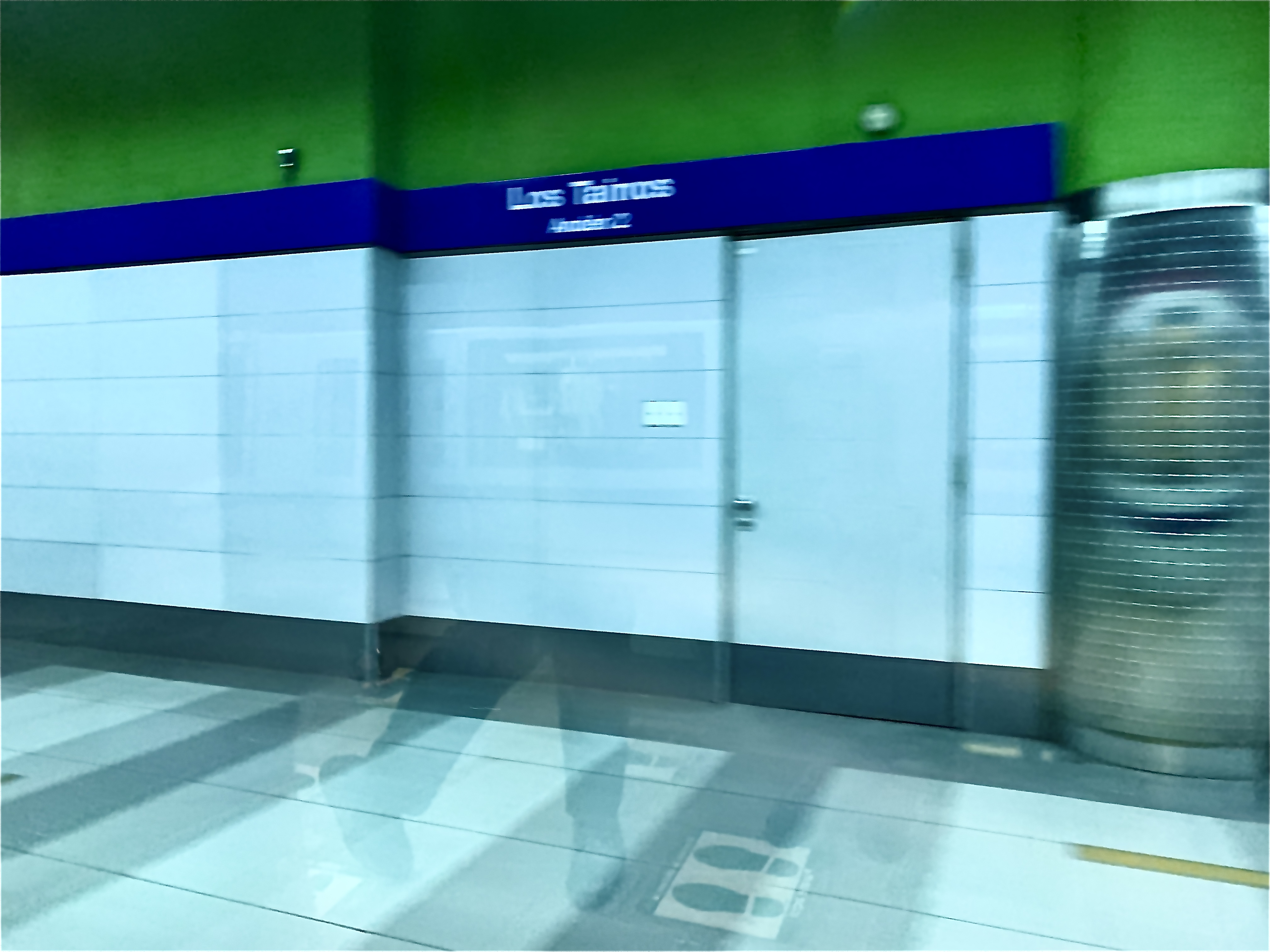

General information
- Location: Santo Domingo; The Dominican Republic
- Coordinates: 18°29′58.6″N 69°54′55.1″W
- System: Santo Domingo Metro station
- Line: Line 1

History
- Opened: 22 January 2009

Services
Preceding station	Santo Domingo Metro	Following station
Máximo Gómez toward Mamá Tingó	Line 1	Pedro Livio Cedeño toward Centro de los Héroes
Location

Los Taínos is a Santo Domingo Metro station on Line 1. It was open on 22 January 2009 as part of the inaugural section of Line 1 between Mamá Tingó and Centro de los Héroes. The station is between Máximo Gómez and Pedro Livio Cedeño.

This is an underground station, built below Avenida Máximo Gómez.
