= Máximo Gómez metro station =

Santo Domingo metro station

Máximo Gómez
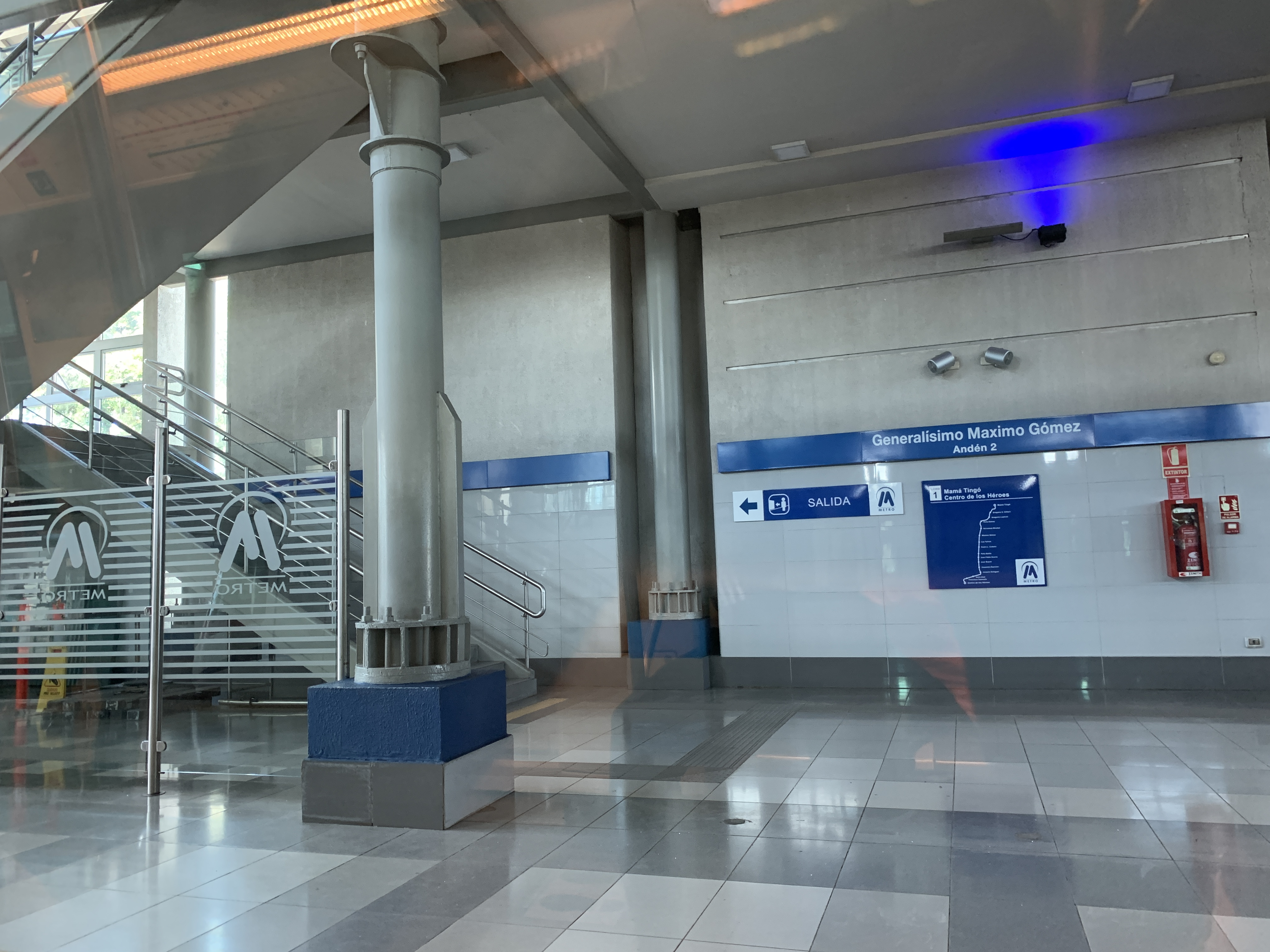

General information
- Location: Santo Domingo; The Dominican Republic
- Coordinates: 18°30′27.2″N 69°54′57.1″W
- System: Santo Domingo Metro station
- Line: Line 1

History
- Opened: 22 January 2009

Services
Preceding station	Santo Domingo Metro	Following station
Hermanas Mirabal toward Mamá Tingó	Line 1	Los Taínos toward Centro de los Héroes
Location

Máximo Gómez is a Santo Domingo Metro station on Line 1. It was open on 22 January 2009 as part of the inaugural section of Line 1 between Mamá Tingó and Centro de los Héroes. The station is between Hermanas Mirabal and Los Taínos.

This is a ground level station, built next to Avenida Máximo Gómez. It is named in honor of Máximo Gómez.
