= Pedro Mir metro station =

Santo Domingo metro station

Pedro Mir
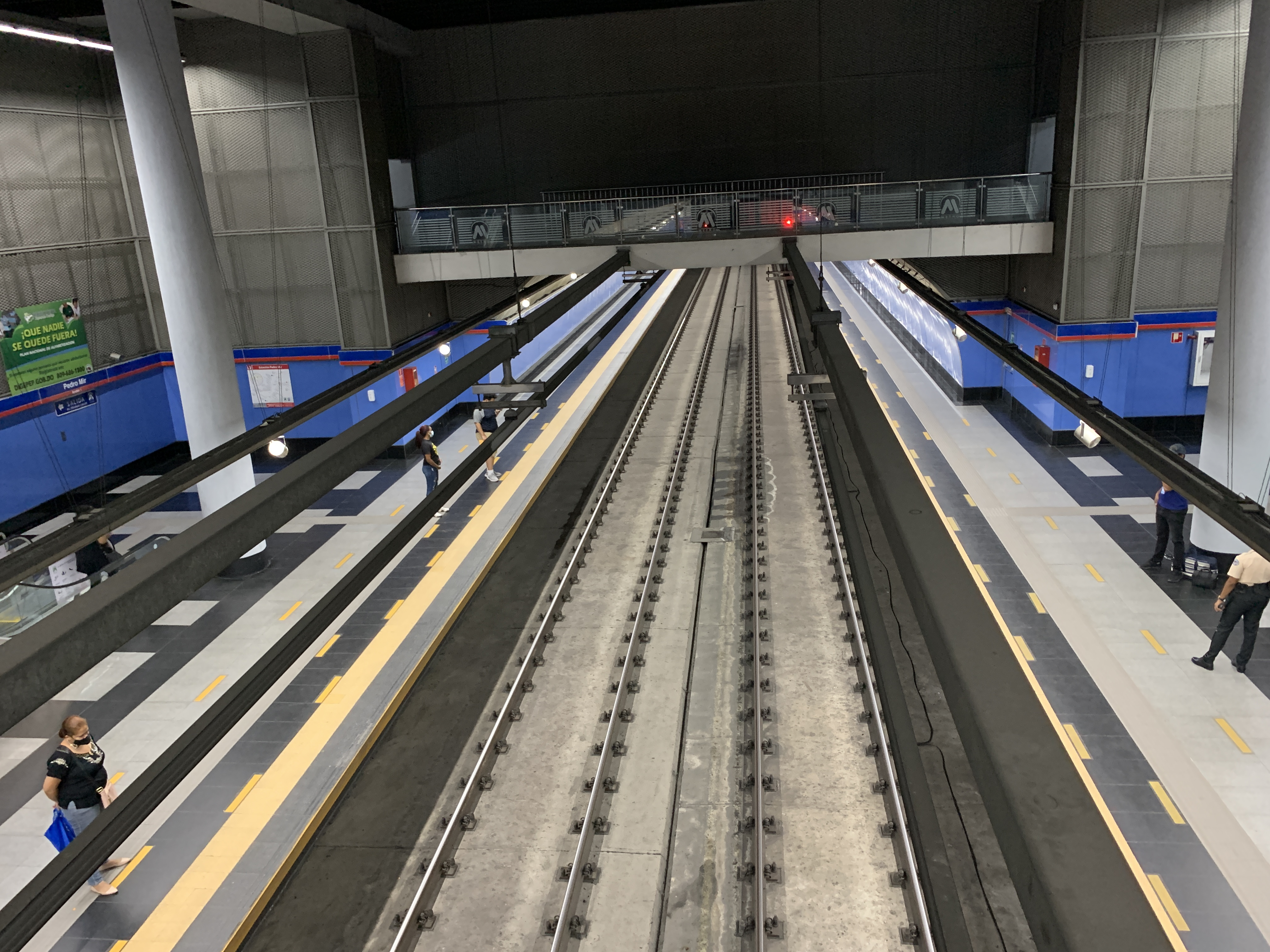

General information
- Location: Santo Domingo; The Dominican Republic
- Coordinates: 18°29′01.4″N 69°56′26.8″W
- System: Santo Domingo Metro station
- Line: Line 2

History
- Opened: 1 April 2013

Services
Preceding station	Santo Domingo Metro	Following station
Ulises Francisco Espaillat toward María Montez	Line 2	Freddy Beras Goico toward Concepción Bona
Location

Pedro Mir is a Santo Domingo Metro station on Line 2. It was open on 1 April 2013 as part of the inaugural section of Line 2 between María Montez and Eduardo Brito. The station is located between Ulises Francisco Espaillat and Freddy Beras Goico.

This is an underground station built below Avenida John F. Kennedy. It is named in honor of Pedro Mir.
