= Freddy Beras Goico metro station =

Santo Domingo metro station

Freddy Beras Goico
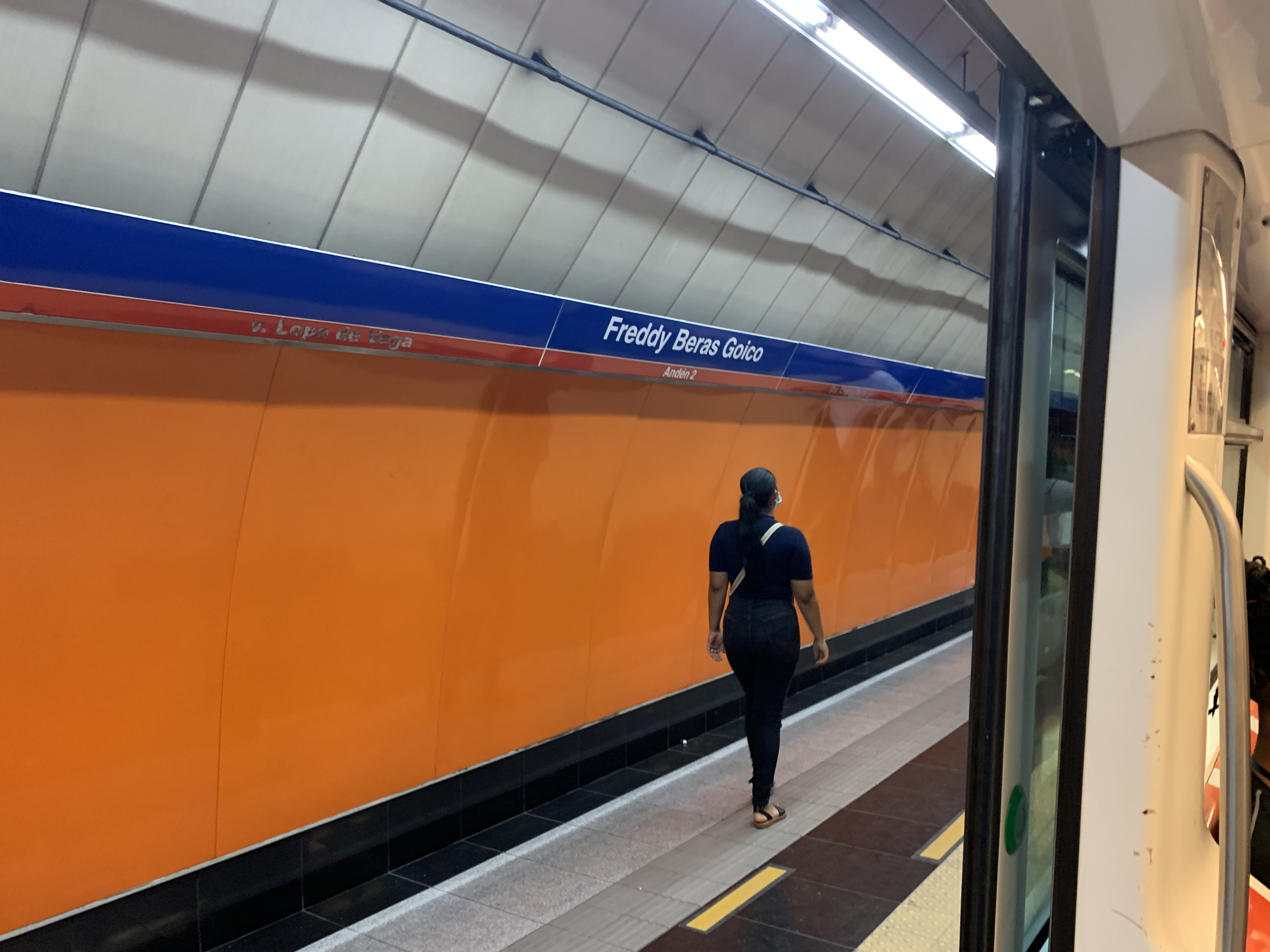

General information
- Location: Santo Domingo; Dominican Republic
- Coordinates: 18°28′57.5″N 69°55′55.1″W
- System: Santo Domingo Metro station
- Line: Line 2

History
- Opened: 1 April 2013

Services
Preceding station	Santo Domingo Metro	Following station
Pedro Mir toward María Montez	Line 2	Juan Ulises García Saleta toward Concepción Bona
Location

Freddy Beras Goico is a Santo Domingo Metro station on Line 2. It was open on 1 April 2013 as part of the inaugural section of Line 2 between María Montez and Eduardo Brito. The station is located between Pedro Mir and Juan Ulises García Saleta.

This is an underground station built below Avenida John F. Kennedy. It is named in honor of Freddy Beras-Goico.
