= Colonel Rafael Tomás Fernández metro station =

Santo Domingo metro station

Colonel Rafael Tomás Fernández

General information
- Location: Santo Domingo; The Dominican Republic
- Coordinates: 18°28′54.5″N 69°54′24.4″W
- System: Santo Domingo Metro station
- Line: Line 2

History
- Opened: 1 April 2013

Services
Preceding station	Santo Domingo Metro	Following station
Juan Pablo Duarte toward María Montez	Line 2	Mauricio Báez toward Concepción Bona
Location

Colonel Rafael Tomás Fernández is a Santo Domingo Metro station on Line 2. It was open on 1 April 2013 as part of the inaugural section of Line 2 between María Montez and Eduardo Brito. The station is located between Juan Pablo Duarte and Mauricio Báez.

This is an underground station built below Avenida John F. Kennedy and Expreso V Centenario. It is named in honor of Rafael Tomás Fernández.
