= Gregorio Urbano Gilbert metro station =

Santo Domingo metro station

Gregorio Urbano Gilbert
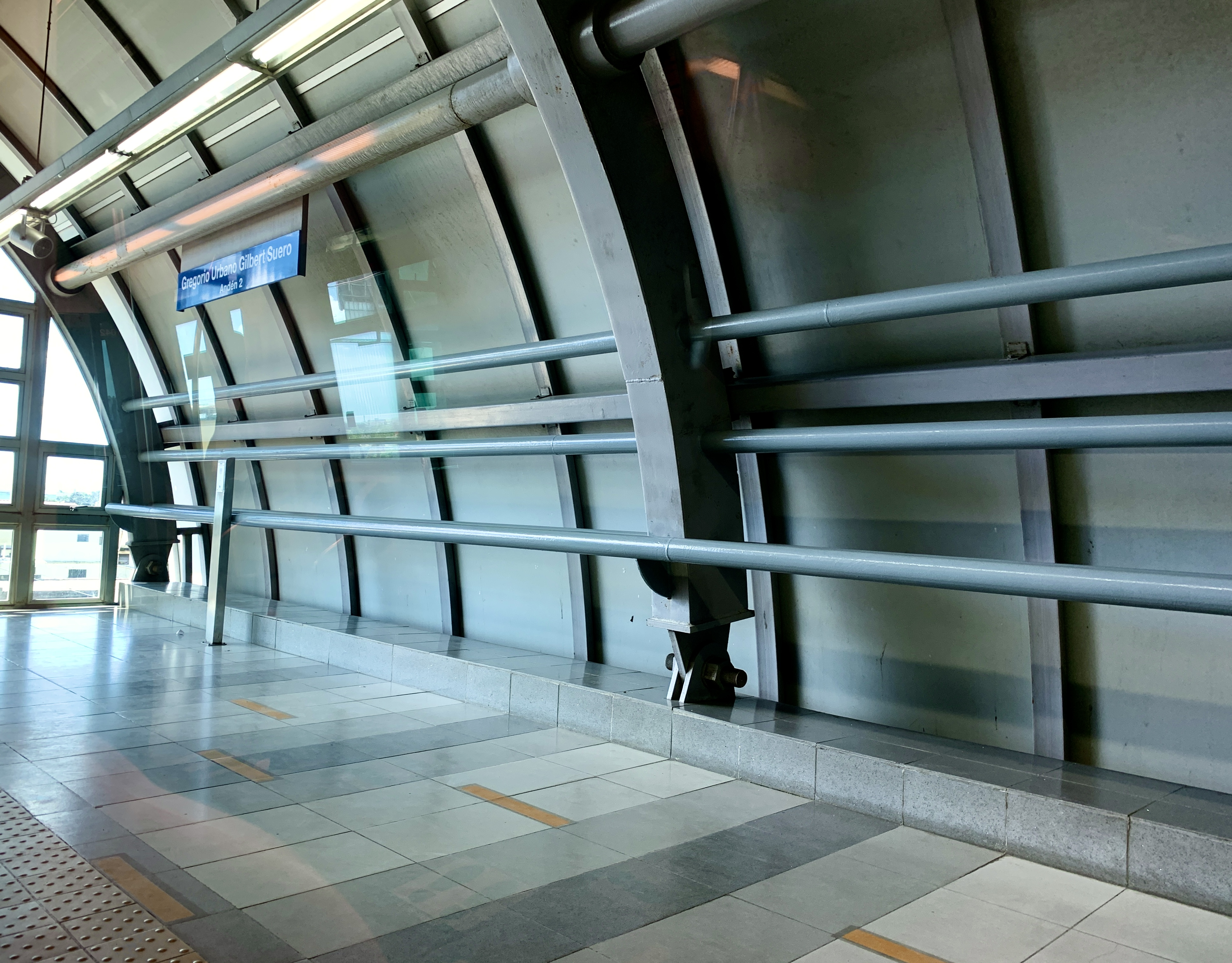

General information
- Location: Santo Domingo; Dominican Republic
- Coordinates: 18°32′24″N 69°54′16.3″W
- System: Santo Domingo Metro station
- Line: Line 1

History
- Opened: 22 January 2009

Services
Preceding station	Santo Domingo Metro	Following station
Mamá Tingó Terminus	Line 1	Gregorio Luperón toward Centro de los Héroes
Location

Gregorio Urbano Gilbert is a Santo Domingo Metro station on Line 1. It was open on 22 January 2009 as part of the inaugural section of Line 1 between Mamá Tingó and Centro de los Héroes. The station is between Mamá Tingó and Gregorio Luperón.

This is an elevated station built above Avenida Hermanas Mirabal. It is named in honor of Gregorio Urbano Gilbert.
