= Casandra Damirón =

Dominican singer (1919–1983)

Altagracia Casandra Damirón Santana, known as Casandra Damirón (March 12, 1919 – December 5, 1983), was a Dominican singer, dancer and folklorist.

== Recognition ==
In her country she was known "La Soberana de la Canción" ("The Sovereign of the Song", "Queen of the Song"). Since 1985 the Casandra Awards in arts was established, in her honor. However in 2012 the descendants of Casandra Damirón decided to withdraw the authorization to use Casandra's name from the awards name arguing that for the previous two years the ceremony departed from the rules which "have governed the award in terms of its content and raison d'être", and therefore it is currently known as the Soberano Awards.

The Casandra Damirón Hall of Fame was established in the consulate of the Dominican Republic in the United States in 1966 which paid homage to prominent persons of Dominican culture. It was dismantled in early 2017 during the remodeling of the consulate.

A metro station in Santo Domingo is named to honor her.

=== Family ===
Via her father, Damirón was of French descent.

She married twice: the first time to Andrés Moreta, and the second time to Luis Armando Rivera González.
