= Freddy Gatón Arce metro station =

Santo Domingo metro station

Freddy Gatón Arce

General information
- Location: Santo Domingo; The Dominican Republic
- Coordinates: 18°30′37.7″N 70°0′29.7″W
- System: Santo Domingo Metro station
- Line: Line 2

History
- Opened: 25 February 2026

Services
Preceding station	Santo Domingo Metro	Following station
Pablo Adón Guzmán toward María Montez	Line 2	27 de Febrero toward Concepción Bona
Location

Freddy Gatón Arce is a Santo Domingo Metro station on Line 2. It was open on 25 February 2026 as part of the western extension of Line 2 between María Montez and Pablo Adón Guzmán. The station is located between 27 de Febrero and Pablo Adón Guzmán.

This is an elevated station built next to Autopista Duarte, close to its crossing with Avenida Primera. It is named in honor of the poet and journalist Freddy Gatón Arce.
