= Francisco Alberto Caamaño metro station =

Santo Domingo metro station

Francisco Alberto Caamaño

General information
- Location: Santo Domingo; Dominican Republic
- Coordinates: 18°27′20.2″N 69°55′26.3″W
- System: Santo Domingo Metro station
- Line: Line 1

History
- Opened: 22 January 2009

Services
Preceding station	Santo Domingo Metro	Following station
Amín Abel toward Mamá Tingó	Line 1	Centro de los Héroes Terminus
Location

Francisco Alberto Caamaño is a Santo Domingo Metro station on Line 1. It was open on 22 January 2009 as part of the inaugural section of Line 1 between Mamá Tingó and Centro de los Héroes. The station is between Amín Abel and Centro de los Héroes.

This is an underground station, built below Avenida Dr. Bernardo Correa y Cidrón. It is named to honor Francisco Caamaño.
