= Ulises Francisco Espaillat metro station =

Santo Domingo metro station

Ulises Francisco Espaillat
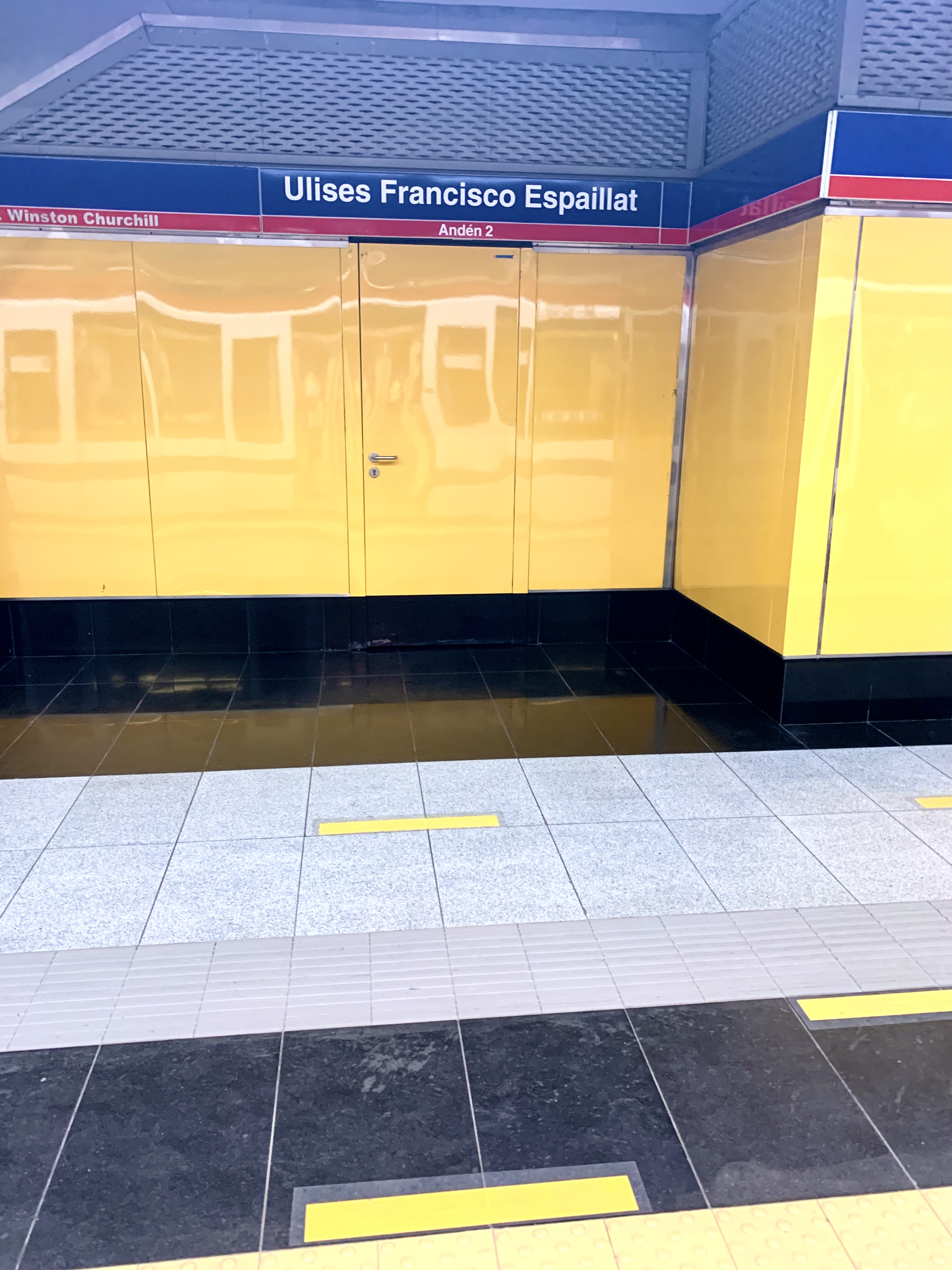

General information
- Location: Santo Domingo; Dominican Republic
- Coordinates: 18°28′55.3″N 69°56′47.9″W
- System: Santo Domingo Metro station
- Line: Line 2

History
- Opened: 1 April 2013

Services
Preceding station	Santo Domingo Metro	Following station
Francisco Gregorio Billini toward María Montez	Line 2	Pedro Mir toward Concepción Bona
Location

Ulises Francisco Espaillat is a Santo Domingo Metro station on Line 2. It was open on 1 April 2013 as part of the inaugural section of Line 2 between María Montez and Eduardo Brito. The station is located between Francisco Gregorio Billini and Pedro Mir.

This is an underground station built below Avenida John F. Kennedy. It is named in honor of Ulises Francisco Espaillat.
