= Pedro Martínez metro station =

Santo Domingo metro station

Pedro Martínez

General information
- Location: Santo Domingo; The Dominican Republic
- Coordinates: 18°29′8.9″N 69°58′41.4″W
- System: Santo Domingo Metro station
- Line: Line 2

History
- Opened: 25 February 2026

Services
Preceding station	Santo Domingo Metro	Following station
Franklin Mieses Burgos toward María Montez	Line 2	María Montez toward Concepción Bona
Location

Pedro Martínez is a Santo Domingo Metro station on Line 2. It was open on 25 February 2026 as part of the western extension of Line 2 between María Montez and Pablo Adón Guzmán. The station is located between María Montez and Franklin Mieses Burgos.

This is an elevated station built above Avenida Los Beisbolistas. It is named in honor of the baseball player Pedro Martínez, living at the time the station was opened.
