= Mauricio Báez metro station =

Santo Domingo metro station

Mauricio Báez

General information
- Location: Santo Domingo; The Dominican Republic
- Coordinates: 18°29′15.3″N 69°54′16.6″W
- System: Santo Domingo Metro station
- Line: Line 2

History
- Opened: 1 April 2013

Services
Preceding station	Santo Domingo Metro	Following station
Colonel Rafael Tomás Fernández toward María Montez	Line 2	Ramón Cáceres toward Concepción Bona
Location

Mauricio Báez is a Santo Domingo Metro station on Line 2. It was open on 1 April 2013 as part of the inaugural section of Line 2 between María Montez and Eduardo Brito. The station is located between Colonel Rafael Tomás Fernández and Ramón Cáceres.

This is an underground station built below Expreso V Centenario. It is named in honor of Mauricio Báez.
