= Amin Abel Hasbun =

Dominican engineer and student activist

Amín Abel Hasbún
- Born: 12 October 1942; Santo Domingo, Dominican Republic
- Died: 24 September 1970 (aged 27); Santo Domingo, Dominican Republic
- Education: Universidad Autónoma de Santo Domingo (UASD)
- Occupations: Civil engineer, student leader, political activist, writer
- Known for: Student leadership; activism; writings on Latin American revolution
- Movement: Movimiento Popular Dominicano (MPD)
- Spouse: Mirna Santos
- Children: 2

Amín Abel Hasbún (12 October 1942 – 24 September 1970) was a Dominican civil engineer, student leader and political activist. A leading figure of student movements in the 1960s, he is remembered for his role in the struggle for university autonomy, his opposition to authoritarian regimes in the Dominican Republic and his political organizing with the Movimiento Popular Dominicano (MPD). He was killed during a police raid in 1970; his death is widely commemorated by student groups and leftist organizations in the Dominican Republic.

== Early life and education ==
Amín Abel Hasbún was born in Santo Domingo on 12 October 1942 to a family of Palestinian-Arab descent. He completed his secondary studies at Colegio La Salle in 1958 where he graduated as Bachiller en Ciencias Físicas y Matemáticas and was awarded the distinction Alumno Eminente.

He earned a degree in civil engineering from the Universidad Autónoma de Santo Domingo (UASD) in 1966, graduating Summa Cum Laude. The UASD later honored him by naming its Faculty of Engineering and Architecture after him and commemorating his life in university activities.

== Political activism ==
Hasbún began his political activism in the early 1960s, taking part in clandestine opposition to the Trujillo dictatorship and later participating in street mobilizations following Trujillo's fall. He was an influential student organizer who took part in movements demanding university autonomy (1961–62) and served as president of the Federación de Estudiantes Dominicanos (FED) during periods of intense political turmoil in the early 1960s.

He joined the Movimiento Popular Dominicano (MPD) where he took leadership roles and worked on urban and rural organizing. He was repeatedly targeted by state security forces during a period of repression under the administration of Joaquín Balaguer.

== Arrest, writings and death ==
In February 1968 Hasbún was arrested during organizing among sugar workers in San Francisco de Macorís and was released in June of the same year. While imprisoned he wrote political articles and began a manuscript titled América Latina busca su camino, which was published in incomplete form after his death (1972).

On 24 September 1970, Hasbún was shot and killed during a police raid at his home in Santo Domingo. Contemporary accounts and later commemorations treat his killing as a politically motivated assassination carried out in the context of state repression against leftist activists; his wife Mirna Santos and their young son were at home at the time.

== Legacy ==
Hasbún is commemorated annually by student groups and leftist organizations in the Dominican Republic. The UASD has made tributes in his honor; public spaces and initiatives (including a Santo Domingo metro station near the UASD and civic programs) have been named after him. Activist groups such as the MPD and student fronts hold memorials at his grave and university monuments.

== Selected works ==
- América Latina busca su camino (manuscript, incomplete — posthumously published 1972).
