= Francisco Gregorio Billini metro station =

Santo Domingo metro station

Francisco Gregorio Billini
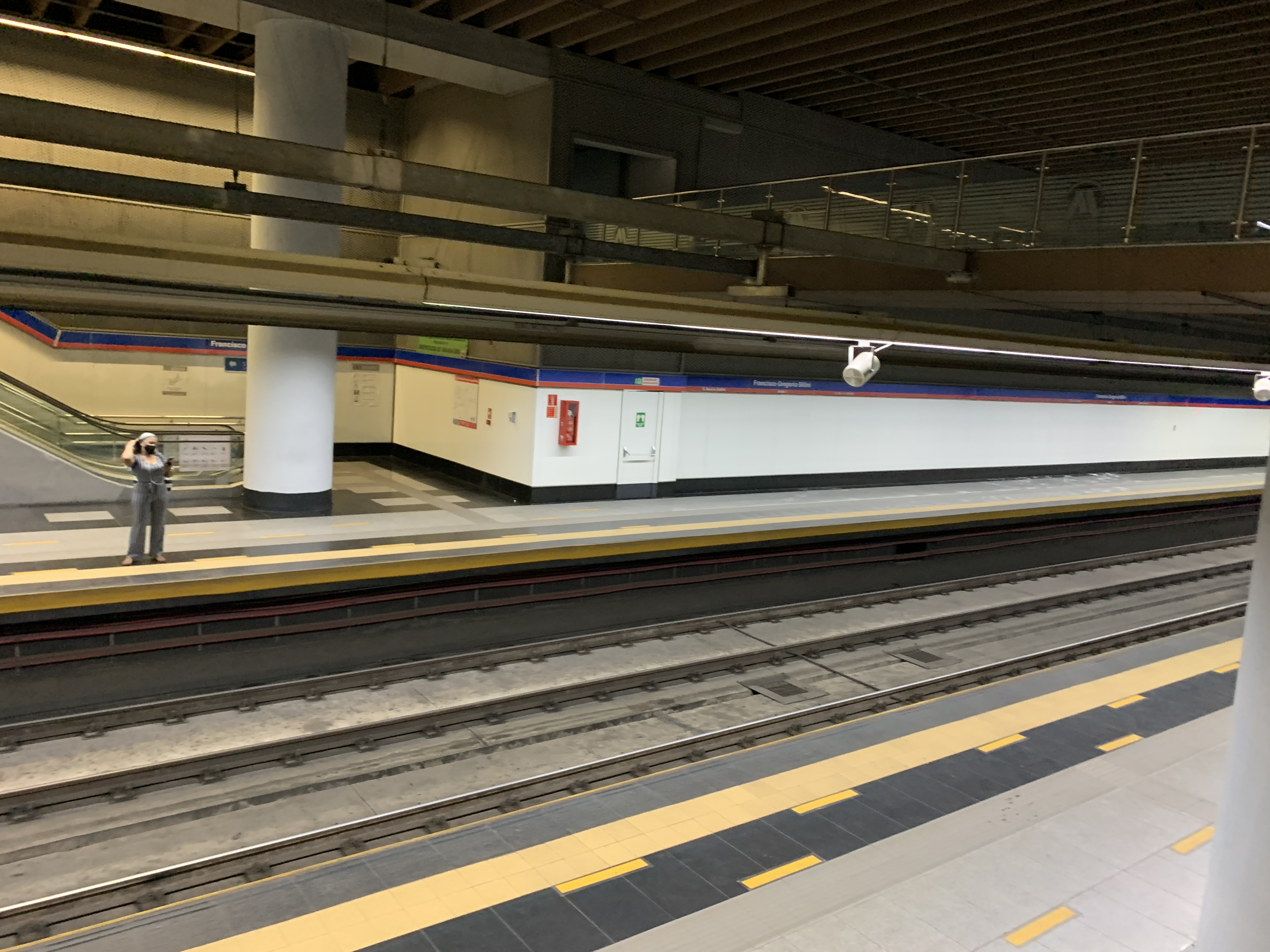

General information
- Location: Santo Domingo; Dominican Republic
- Coordinates: 18°28′53.4″N 69°57′16.2″W
- System: Santo Domingo Metro station
- Line: Line 2

History
- Opened: 1 April 2013

Services
Preceding station	Santo Domingo Metro	Following station
Pedro Francisco Bonó toward María Montez	Line 2	Ulises Francisco Espaillat toward Concepción Bona
Location

Francisco Gregorio Billini is a Santo Domingo Metro station on Line 2. It was opened on 1 April 2013 as part of the inaugural section of Line 2 between María Montez and Eduardo Brito. The station is located between Pedro Francisco Bonó and Ulises Francisco Espaillat.

This is an underground station built below Avenida John F. Kennedy. It is named in honor of Francisco Gregorio Billini.
