= Juan Bosch metro station =

Santo Domingo metro station

Juan Bosch

General information
- Location: Santo Domingo; The Dominican Republic
- Coordinates: 18°28′36″N 69°54′50″W
- System: Santo Domingo Metro station
- Line: Line 1

History
- Opened: 22 January 2009

Services
| Preceding station | Santo Domingo Metro | Following station |
|---|---|---|
| Juan Pablo Duarte toward Mamá Tingó | Line 1 | Casandra Damirón toward Centro de los Héroes |
Location

Juan Bosch is a Santo Domingo Metro station on Line 1. It was open on 22 January 2009 as part of the inaugural section of Line 1 between Mamá Tingó and Centro de los Héroes. The station is between Juan Pablo Duarte and Casandra Damirón.

This is an underground station, built below Avenida Máximo Gómez. It is named to honor Juan Bosch, who served as a president of the Dominican Republic.
