= Pedro Mir =

Dominican poet and writer

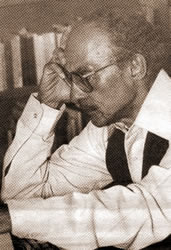
- Pedro Mir
- Born: Pedro Julio Mir Valentín; 3 June 1913; San Pedro de Macorís, Dominican Republic
- Died: 11 July 2000 (aged 87); Santo Domingo, Dominican Republic
- Education: Universidad Autónoma de Santo Domingo
- Occupations: lawyer, writer, poet
- Awards: Poet Laureate (1984)

Pedro Julio Mir Valentín (3 June 1913 – 11 July 2000) was a Dominican poet and writer, named Poet Laureate of the Dominican Republic by Congress in 1984, and a member of the generation of "Independent poets of the 1940s" in Dominican poetry.

== Life and career ==
Pedro Julio Mir was born in San Pedro de Macorís, where His father, Pedro Celestino Mir Burgal, a Cuban mechanical engineer from Guantánamo, had migrated from Cuba in the early 1900s as Chief Engineer of the Cristóbal Colón Sugar Refinery. Soon he married a Puerto Rican girl, Jacoba Vicenta Valentín Mendoza from Humacao, and had a son whom he named Pedro Julio., which was located near the city of San Pedro de Macorís. His mother, died prematurely, in 1917, which impressed upon him a profound sense of loss that he would later consider the root of his poetical vocation.

In the early years of the 1930s, Pedro Julio Mir started writing and publishing his poems in Dominican newspapers (under the full name "Pedro Julio Mir"), as well as showing them to his friends. One of those friends, without his consent, took some verses to Juan Bosch, a prominent Dominican writer of the time. Bosch noticed the natural poetic fiber of the young author, but dismissed the verses saying that the poet, though talented, should "turn his eyes to his country". When Mir was informed of Bosch's reaction, he decided then to write his first social poems, and this time, he sent them to Bosch himself. Bosch made no immediate remark; however, he had the verses published very soon in his column of the Listín Diario, the most important Dominican newspaper of the time. The verses appeared under the name Pedro Mir (for some reason Bosch chose to drop the "Julio" middle name) and what later became a prophecy: "Is this young man the social poet we’ve been long waiting for?"

The next years Mir kept writing and studying, obtaining a Doctor Degree in Law from the Universidad Autónoma de Santo Domingo (UASD) State University in 1941 and starting a practice in an office of the Dominican capital, Santo Domingo. However, the pressure of the Trujillo dictatorship became unbearable, especially for anybody with social concerns. His poems were putting him up against the regime, so after receiving threats and feeling his life in danger, he fled to Cuba in 1947. The exile would last sixteen years, until the regime fell in 1963. During the exile he traveled to many countries, but spent most of the time in Cuba.

It was while living precariously in Cuba that he wrote his famous poem "Hay un país en el mundo" (There is a country in the world). Originally published in Spanish in 1949, it has been translated to dozens of languages.

In 1952, Mir published in Guatemala his Contracanto a Walt Whitman (canto a nosotros mismos) (Countersong to Walt Whitman (Song of Ourselves)), considered one of his most accomplished works. (Its title references Whitman's "Song of Myself".) Translated to many languages, the poem has been the subject of many studies in the United States and other countries.

Mir returned to the Dominican Republic in 1963, during the democratic government of President Juan Bosch. After Bosch's government was overthrown the same year, Mir, seriously ill, traveled again for a while, though he finally settled with his family in the Dominican capital in 1968, winning the Chair of Aesthetics at the UASD.

Mir also committed himself to historical research. His essay Las raíces dominicanas de la doctrina Monroe (The Dominican Roots of the Monroe Doctrine) (1974) won the Annual History Award given by the Secretary of Education of the Dominican Republic.

In 1975, his poem El huracán Neruda (The Hurricane Neruda) also won the Annual Poetry Award given by the Secretary of Education of the Dominican Republic.

His only novel Cuando amaban las tierras comuneras (When They Loved the Communal Land) was published in Mexico in 1978 and has been highly regarded in the Dominican Republic as well as internationally.

In 1984, the Dominican Congress named him "Poet Laureate of the Dominican Republic".

In 1991, Mir traveled to New York to receive an Honorary Doctorate in Humane Letters, honoris causa, from the Hunter College of the City University of New York.

In 1993, Mir was awarded the Dominican National Literature Award for his lifetime achievements.

Pedro Mir died peacefully in Santo Domingo on 11 July 2000, surrounded by his family, after a long pulmonary illness.

In 2017 Ediciones Cielonaranja has published his "Poesía Completa".

A metro station in Santo Domingo is named after him.

== List of works ==
- Hay un país en el mundo (1949)
- Contracanto a Walt Whitman (1952)
- Seis momentos de esperanza (1953)
- Poemas de buen amor y a veces de fantasía (1969)
- Amén de mariposas (1969)
- Tres leyendas de colores (1969)
- El gran incendio (1969)
- Viaje a la muchedumbre (1971)
- Apertura a la estética (1974)
- Las raíces dominicanas de la doctrina Monroe (1974)
- El huracán Neruda (1975)
- La gran hazaña de Límber y después otoño (1977)
- Cuando amaban las tierras comuneras (1978)
- Fundamentos de teoría y crítica del arte (1979)
- La noción del período en la historia dominicana (1981)
- ¡Buen viaje, Pancho Valentín! (Memorias de un marinero) (1981)
- Historia del hambre en la República Dominicana (1987)
- Estética del soldadito (1991)
- El lapicida de los ojos morados (1991)
- Primeros versos (1993)
- Ayer menos cuarto y otras crónicas (2000)

"Letras dispersas (2013)

== See also ==
- American Airlines Flight 587
- List of people from the Dominican Republic
- List of Cubans
- List of Puerto Ricans
