= Pedro Francisco Bonó metro station =

Santo Domingo metro station

Pedro Francisco Bonó

General information
- Location: Santo Domingo; Dominican Republic
- Coordinates: 18°28′47.4″N 69°57′43.5″W
- System: Santo Domingo Metro station
- Line: Line 2

History
- Opened: 1 April 2013

Services
Preceding station	Santo Domingo Metro	Following station
María Montez Terminus	Line 2	Francisco Gregorio Billini toward Concepción Bona
Location

Pedro Francisco Bonó is a Santo Domingo Metro station on Line 2. It was open on 1 April 2013 as part of the inaugural section of Line 2 between María Montez and Eduardo Brito. The station is located between María Montez and Francisco Gregorio Billini.

This is an underground station built below Avenida John F. Kennedy. It is named in honor of Pedro Francisco Bonó.
