= Gregorio Urbano Gilbert =

Dominican Republic linotypist and guerrilla fighter

Gregorio Urbano Gilbert Suero (May 25, 1898 – November 29, 1970) was a Dominican Republic linotypist and guerrilla fighter. Between the 1910s and 1960s, he was known to have taken part in the rebellions against American forces in the Dominican Republic and in Nicaragua.

== Birth and early life ==
Gilbert’s parents were Narcisa Suero, a Dominican woman, and Benjamin Gilbert, a Bahamian immigrant. Through his maternal side, he is related to Juan Suero (nicknamed the "Black Cid"), a prominent fighter who fought in the Independence and Restoration wars during the mid-1800s. He became orphan at a young age and his eldest siblings raised him. In 1916, Gilbert settled in San Pedro de Macorís where he worked as a linotypist, and as a salesclerk in a grocery store.

== Fight against the United States ==
On January 10, 1917, U. S. marines were invading the port city, and Gilbert decided to fight against them, he charged a revolver and shot against the marines, killing officer C. H. Burton in the firefight. He joined the guerrilla against the United States occupation; he was captured and sentenced to death. His sentence was commuted to life imprisonment, but he was released on October 22, 1922; Gilbert went to the exile in Cuba, Curaçao, and Nicaragua. In Nicaragua, he joined Sandino’s rebellion against the United States occupation of that country.

In 1929, he returned to the Dominican Republic.

== Final years and death ==
Gilbert was also part of the 1965 April Revolution and fight against the second United States occupation of the Dominican Republic (1965–66). In 1970, Gilbert wrote his memoir and died shortly afterwards.

== Legacy ==
A metro station in Santo Domingo is named in honor of Gilbert.
