= Juan Ulises García Saleta metro station =

Santo Domingo metro station

Juan Ulises García Saleta
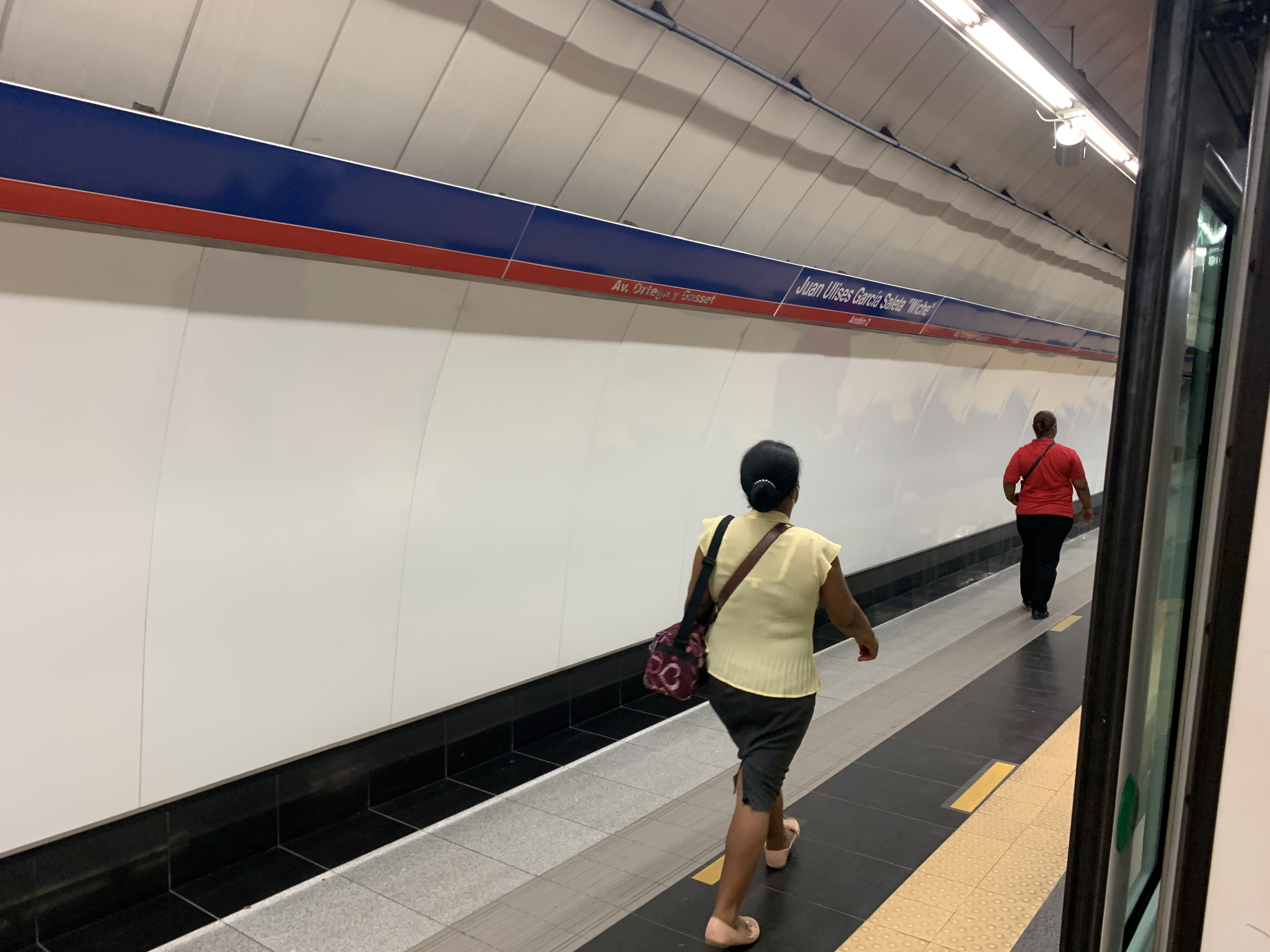

General information
- Location: Santo Domingo; The Dominican Republic
- Coordinates: 18°28′55″N 69°55′13.4″W
- System: Santo Domingo Metro station
- Line: Line 2

History
- Opened: 1 April 2013

Services
Preceding station	Santo Domingo Metro	Following station
Freddy Beras Goico toward María Montez	Line 2	Juan Pablo Duarte toward Concepción Bona
Location

Juan Ulises García Saleta is a Santo Domingo Metro station on Line 2. It was open on 1 April 2013 as part of the inaugural section of Line 2 between María Montez and Eduardo Brito. The station is located between Freddy Beras Goico and Juan Pablo Duarte.

This is an underground station built below Avenida John F. Kennedy. It is named in honor of Juan Ulises García Saleta.
