= Santo Domingo Metro =

Mass transit system in Santo Domingo, Dominican Republic

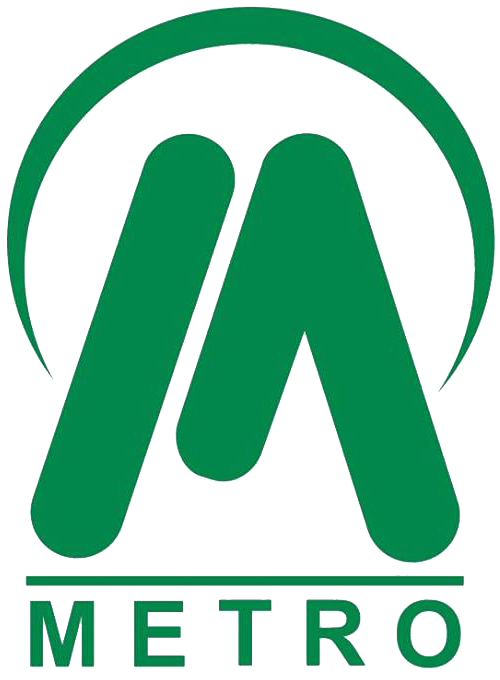

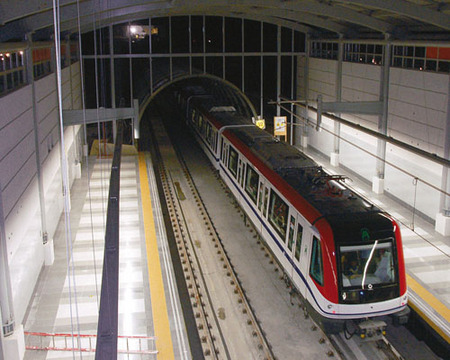

Overview
- Native name: Metro de Santo Domingo
- Area served: Greater Santo Domingo, Dominican Republic
- Transit type: Rapid transit
- Number of lines: 2
- Number of stations: 39
- Daily ridership: 284,941 (daily avg. 2022/2023)
- Annual ridership: 104,003,341 (2022/2023)
- Website: www.opret.gob.do (in Spanish)

Operation
- Began operation: January 30, 2009; 17 years ago
- Operator: Empresa Metropolitana de Transporte (EMT)
- Character: Mostly underground, with an elevated section on Line 1
- Number of vehicles: 46 Alstom Metropolis three-car trainsets (March 2025)

Technical
- System length: 35.5 km (22.1 mi)
- Track gauge: 1,435 mm (4 ft 8 1/2 in) standard gauge
- Electrification: Overhead line, 1,500 V DC
System map
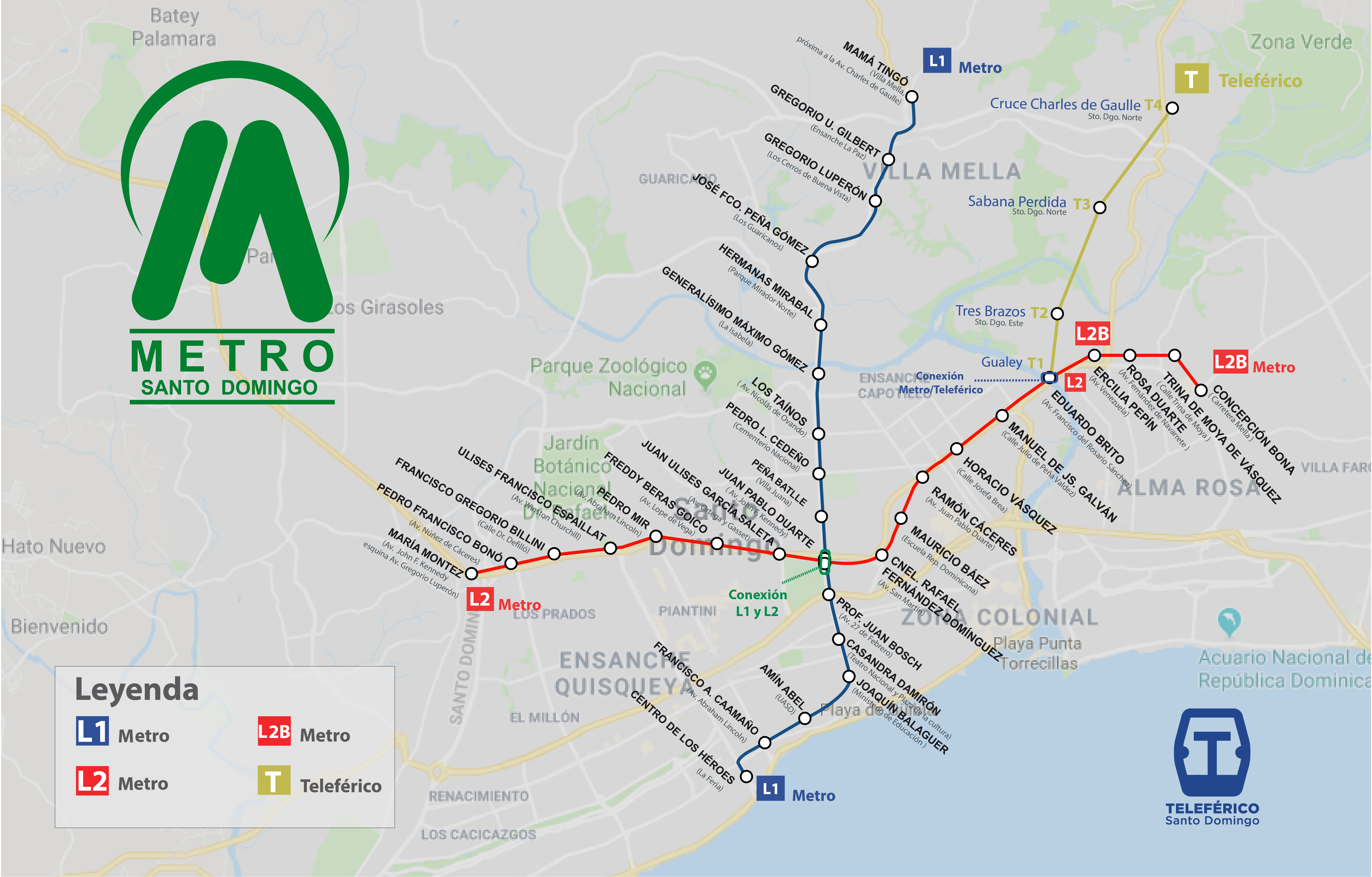

The Santo Domingo Metro (Spanish: Metro de Santo Domingo) is a rapid transit system in Greater Santo Domingo. Serving the capital of the Dominican Republic, it is the most extensive metro system in the insular Caribbean and Central American region by length and number of stations. It began operation on January 30, 2009.

The Metro is a major part of the "National Master Plan" to improve transportation in Greater Santo Domingo and the rest of the nation. The first line was planned to relieve traffic congestion on the Máximo Gómez and Hermanas Mirabal Avenue thoroughfares, which connect Santo Domingo. The second line, which opened in April 2013, is meant to relieve the congestion along the Duarte-Kennedy-Centenario Corridor in the city from west to east. The current length of the Metro, with the sections of the two lines open as of April 2026, is 35.5 kilometers (22.1 miles). Before the second line's opening, 30,856,515 passengers had ridden the Santo Domingo Metro in 2012. With both lines opened, ridership increased to 61,270,054 passengers in 2014 and reached 104,003,341 between May 2022 and May 2023.

Four more lines were planned to be constructed, for a total of six lines, but just two remained to be implemented in the near future.

== Overview ==
The first line was unofficially inaugurated on February 27, 2008. On December 22, 2008, non-commercial operation of the metro system began and provided free service to the public during the Christmas holiday season. The metro was closed on January 6, 2009, for final touches before it opened for commercial use on January 30, 2009.

Shortly after the inauguration of Line 1, presidential elections took place in the Dominican Republic. President Leonel Fernández stayed in power and promised to continue the expansion of the Metro across the Greater Santo Domingo. By mid-2009, construction of Line 2 had commenced and it opened on April 1, 2013. An approval for an expansion of the second line was issued January 2014, with construction beginning on April 1, 2014.

== Approval and construction ==
=== Line 1 ===
President Leonel Fernández proposed and started the construction of the first subway system in the Dominican Republic and the second in the Caribbean. The actual first phase of the overall "Master Plan" for the Metro took place once Fernandez had proposed the construction of the Juan Bosch Bridge. The bridge was built with support for two heavy rail lines on the deck that until the third line of the system gets built are being used for regular vehicle traffic. This phase took place under Fernandez's first administration and with very little public knowledge of the Master Plan.

The project was prompted by the need to reduce the continually-rising heavy road traffic congestion; the current disorganized and inefficient public transportation system; and air pollution, which severely affects the residents' productive time and the health. The system will complement other forms of public transportation such as OMSA (Metropolitan Office of Buses Services) buses, with the government estimating that around 100 feeder buses will be in service.

The first line of the mass-transit system has sixteen stations: six elevated, ten underground. It has a total route length of 14.5 km (9.0 mi) and connects Villa Mella in Santo Domingo Norte with La Feria in Santo Domingo. That is expected to bring relief to the city's current public transport system. Daily ridership is expected to be about 200,000 passengers once other lines or at least the feeder bus system is integrated. The first line opened for commercial service on January 30, 2009.

On September 23, 2007, President Fernández while on a trip to the East Coast of the United States announced that stations on the Santo Domingo Metro were not to be named by the streets that they intercepted but instead named to honor important historical people of the Dominican Republic. On February 25, 2008, during the final testing before the official inauguration of the line by President Fernández, Ing. Diandino Peña announced the official names for the stations.

=== Line 2 ===
In the presidential elections that took place on May 16, 2008, President Fernández was re-elected for his second consecutive term. However, long before his re-election, companies that specialize in studying land composition had begun drilling holes specifically around the area at which Line 2 (along Avenida John F. Kennedy, a major throughway in the city that turns into Duarte Highway, connecting the city with Santiago) was being built.

Line 2 runs east–west under Avenida John F. Kennedy from the westernmost metropolitan stretch of the city to the eastern part of the city and intersect Line 1 in the heart of the city. The line was originally planned to be underground in its entire 22 km (14 mi) course. Line 2 will cost about three times more than Line 1 to complete because of its length and rising prices. The economic burden that it would place on the national budget caused the decision, which was officially announced in September 2009, to construct it in two phases.

The first phase was planned to be from Los Alcarrizos to Puente de la 17, where it crosses the first line. A second phase was planned to complete the line from Puente de la 17 to San Isidro, in the eastern portion of Santo Domingo Este. Later, the project has been reduced to ensure the conclusion and operation of a second line by the end of the 2008-2012 presidential term and line 2 was starting to operate from station María Montez at Avenida Gregorio Luperón to the station Eduardo Brito before Puente de la 17, at Avenida Francisco del Rosario Sánchez.

Line 2 opened on April 1, 2013. An approval for an eastern expansion of the second line from Eduardo Brito to Concepción Bona was issued January 2014, and construction began on April 1, 2014. The extension was completed and was officially opened on August 8, 2018. The western extension from Avenida Luperon to Los Alcarrizos started construction in 2022. It is mainly elevated to reduce costs and shorting implementing time. The extension opened on 25 February 2026.

=== Téléferico ===
The Teleférico de Santo Domingo is an aerial cable car urban transit system operated as part of the Santo Domingo Metro. As of 2026, the system consists of two operative lines plus a third line under construction.

== Rolling stock ==
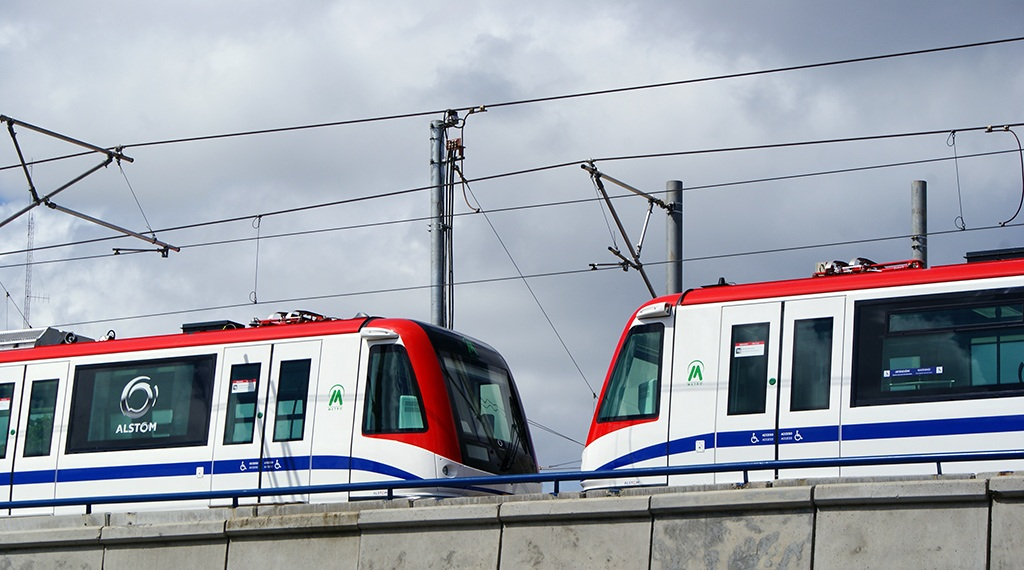
Two trains of the 9000 series parked before opening of the Santo Domingo Metro (2008)

The French firm Alstom supplied a total of 19 Alstom Metropolis 9000 three-car trainsets (57 cars) from its factories in Belgium, France and Spain in a contract worth 92.5 million euros. The cars are almost identical to the 9000 series on the Barcelona Metro except for the livery. In January 2011, an order was announced for a further 15 Alstom trainsets for Line 2, but in the end, the order was changed in 2015 to only 6 trainsets, which have been delivered in 2018/2019. In August 2021, another order of 24 more three-car trainsets has been signed between OPRET and Alstom, delivery started in July 2023. In January 2023, an order was announced for the supply of a further 10 three-car Alstom Metropolis trainsets. Once delivered, the total number of trainsets in the fleet will be brought to 64. Eight more Metropolis trainsets were ordered in April 2024, bringing the total number of trainsets further up to 72.

The first train was shipped from Barcelona in December 2007 and arrived on January 3, 2008. The standard gauge units have air-conditioning, CCTV, and passenger information and can accommodate 617 passengers per trainset. The trains initially consist of three cars, but all stations are being built to accommodate six-car trains in anticipation of expected future ridership demand. The first trains with six carriages (through double traction of three-car units) are expected to start operating in July 2025 and will be gradually integrated into the system.

Unlike many rapid transit systems, Santo Domingo Metro trains do not collect power from a third rail, as trainsets collect their power from an overhead line system.

== Station locations ==
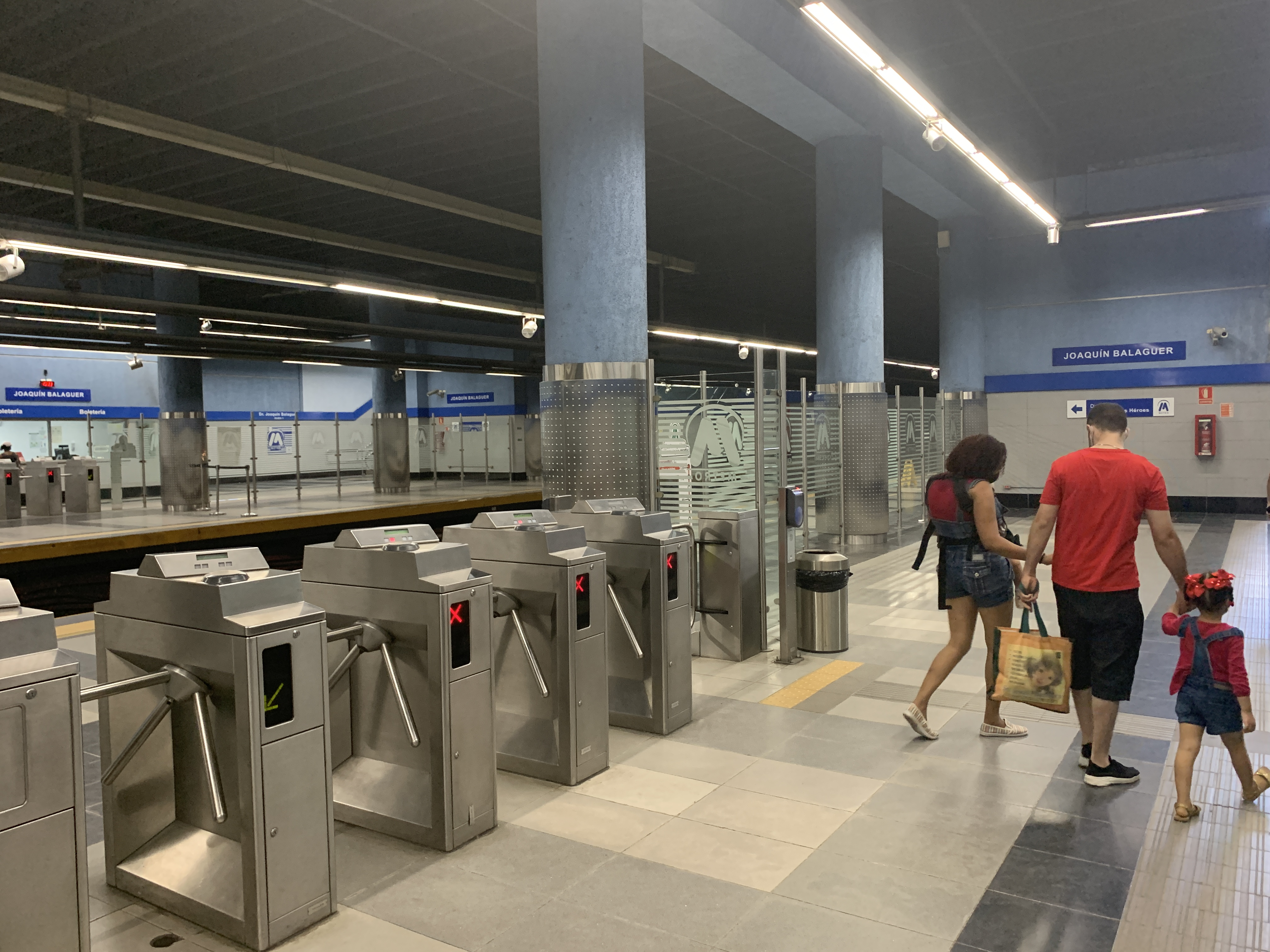
Passengers in the Joaquín Balaguer metro station

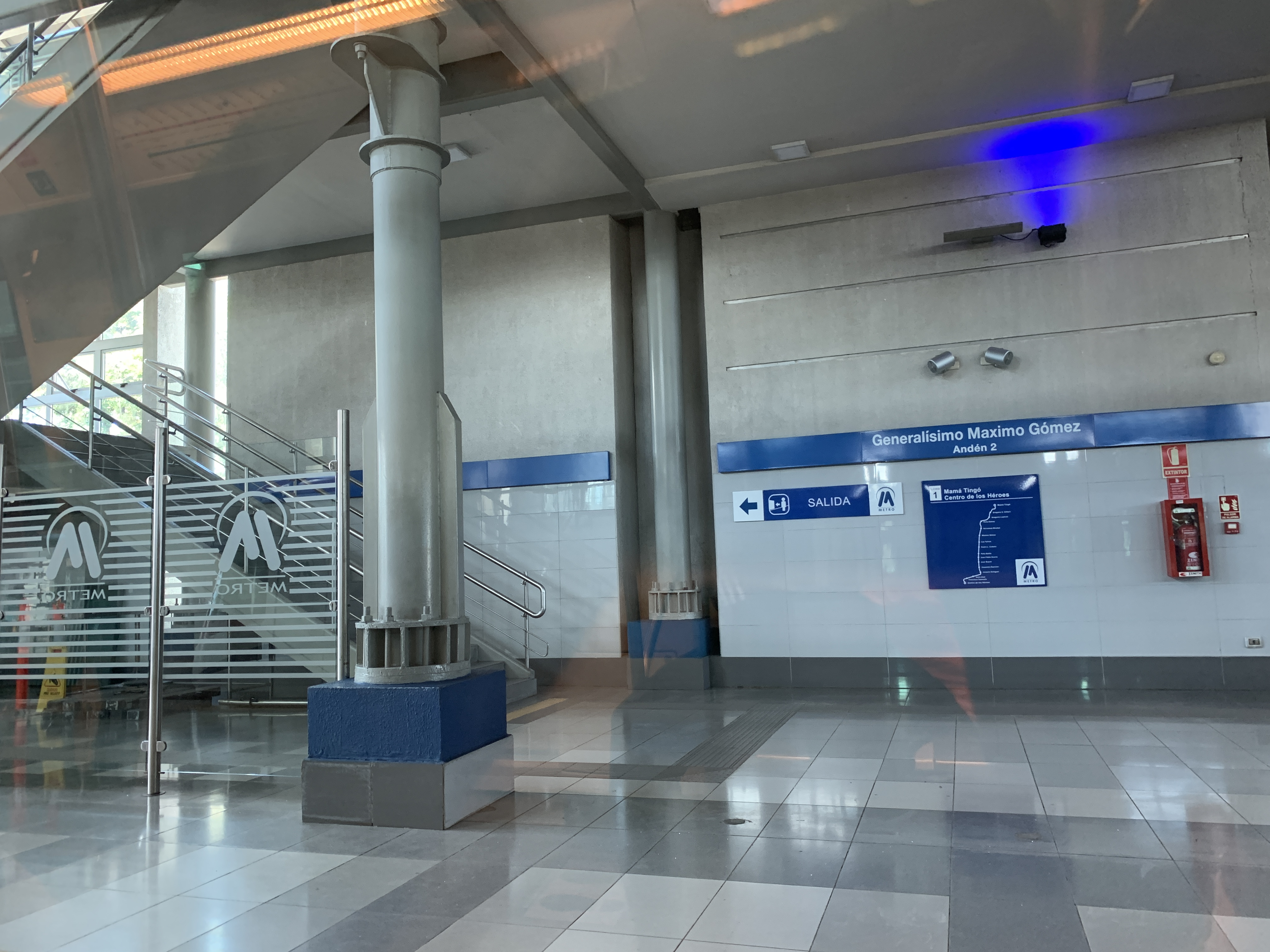
Máximo Gómez metro station

Line 1; 14.5 km (9.0 mi); Villa Mella to Centro de los Héroes; 16 stations	Line 2; 21 km (13 mi); Ave. Luperón to Carretera Mella; 23 stations
Mamá Tingó; Gregorio Urbano Gilbert; Gregorio Luperón; José Francisco Peña Gómez; Hermanas Mirabal; Máximo Gómez; Los Taínos; Pedro Livio Cedeño; Manuel Arturo Peña Batlle; Juan Pablo Duarte; Juan Bosch; Casandra Damirón; Joaquín Balaguer; Amín Abel; Francisco Alberto Caamaño; Centro de los Héroes	Pablo Adón Guzmán; Freddy Gatón Arce; 27 de Febrero; Franklin Mieses Burgos; Pedro Martínez; María Montez; Pedro Francisco Bonó; Francisco Gregorio Billini; Ulises Francisco Espaillat; Pedro Mir; Freddy Beras Goico; Juan Ulises García Saleta; Juan Pablo Duarte; Colonel Rafael Tomás Fernández; Mauricio Báez; Ramón Cáceres; Horacio Vásquez; Manuel de Jesús Galván; Eduardo Brito; Ercilia Pepin; Rosa Duarte; Trina de Moya de Vasquez; Concepción Bona

== Boleto Viajero ==
Boleto Viajero
- Location: Greater Santo Domingo
- Launched: 2009
- Technology: MIFARE Classic / MIFARE Ultralight
- Operator: Thales
- Manager: OPRET
- Currency: DOP
- Stored-value: Viajes
- Credit expiry: None
- Validity: Santo Domingo Metro
- Retailed: Santo Domingo Metro stations

The Boleto Viajero is a reloadable contactless smart card used for electronic transit fare payment by riders of the Santo Domingo Metro.

The card can be acquired in a Santo Domingo Metro station for DOP$60 with a minimum reload of 2 rides (DOP$40). It is offered as an alternative to the single-use cardboard cards. Even though the cardboard cards have a lower initial cost (DOP$15), they cannot be reloaded and must be discarded after their use.

Although OPRET lists price amounts against number of rides (viajes), the card records its balance in DOP. A bonus is also provided for 10 or 20 ride reloads.

Rides	Cost	Card balance
1	DOP$20	DOP$20
10	DOP$185	DOP$200
20	DOP$360	DOP$400

As identification is not required to purchase the card, and Boleto Viajero cards cannot be registered. OPRET does not refund users in the event of loss or damage. The card must be reloaded in person at a ticket vending booth, as OPRET does not offer Internet or phone-based top-up services. Automatic top-ups are also not available.

The Boleto Viajero cards are based on NXP MIFARE Classic chips and can be read by any ISO/IEC 14443 Type A reader. The single-use cardboard cards as of 2022 use NXP MIFARE Ultralight. However, only the card's manufacturer information (sector 0) is readable by the general public, as all of the remaining blocks are encrypted by using an unknown key.

== See also ==
- Santiago Light Rail (planned)
- Rail transport in the Dominican Republic
- List of Latin American rail transit systems by ridership
- List of metro systems
