= Pablo Adón Guzmán metro station =

Santo Domingo metro station

Pablo Adón Guzmán

General information
- Location: Santo Domingo; The Dominican Republic
- Coordinates: 18°31′10.7″N 70°0′37.4″W
- System: Santo Domingo Metro station
- Line: Line 2

History
- Opened: 25 February 2026

Services
Preceding station	Santo Domingo Metro	Following station
Terminus	Line 2	Freddy Gatón Arce toward Concepción Bona
Location

Pablo Adón Guzmán is a Santo Domingo Metro station on Line 2. It was open on 25 February 2026 as part of the western extension of Line 2 between María Montez and Pablo Adón Guzmán and serves as the western terminus of the line. The adjacent station is Freddy Gatón Arce.

This is an elevated station built next to Autopista Duarte, close to calle Padre Betancourt and the municipality of Los Alcarrizos.
