= María Montez metro station =

Santo Domingo metro station

María Montez

General information
- Location: Santo Domingo; The Dominican Republic
- Coordinates: 18°28′42.6″N 69°58′06.8″W
- System: Santo Domingo Metro station
- Line: Line 2

History
- Opened: 1 April 2013

Services
Preceding station	Santo Domingo Metro	Following station
Pedro Martínez toward María Montez	Line 2	Pedro Francisco Bonó toward Concepción Bona
Location

María Montez is a Santo Domingo Metro station on Line 2. It was open on 1 April 2013 as part of the inaugural section of Line 2 between María Montez and Eduardo Brito. It was the western terminus of the line until 25 February 2026, when an extension to Pablo Adón Guzmán was opened. The adjacent stations are Pedro Francisco Bonó and Pedro Martínez.

This is an underground station built below Avenida John F. Kennedy. It is named in honor of Maria Montez.
