= Mamá Tingó metro station =

Santo Domingo metro station

Mamá Tingó
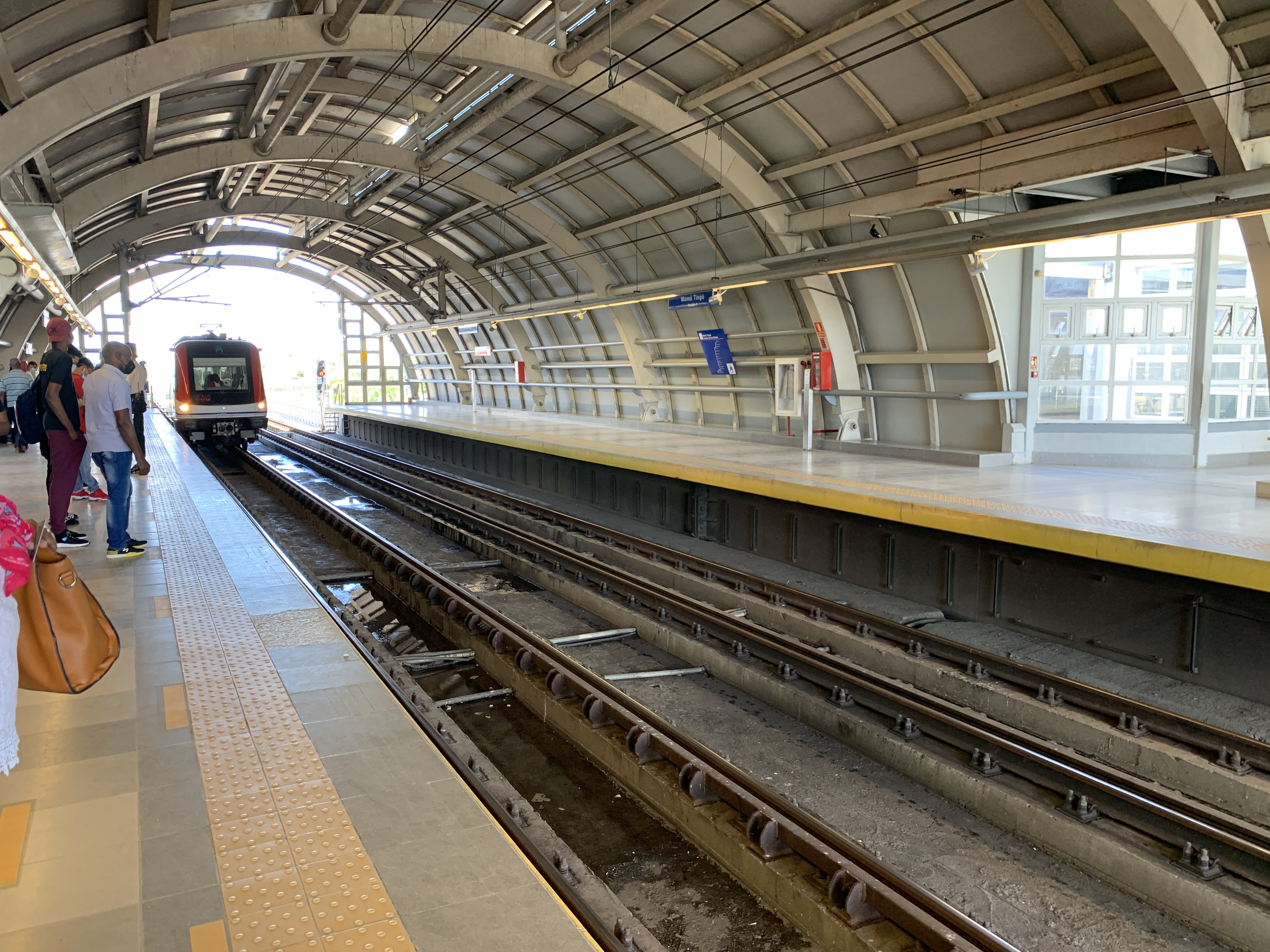

General information
- Location: Santo Domingo; The Dominican Republic
- Coordinates: 18°32′48.1″N 69°54′03.5″W
- System: Santo Domingo Metro station
- Line: Line 1

History
- Opened: 22 January 2009

Services
| Preceding station | Santo Domingo Metro | Following station |
|---|---|---|
| Terminus | Line 1 | Gregorio Urbano Gilbert toward Centro de los Héroes |
Location

Mamá Tingó is a Santo Domingo Metro station on Line 1. It was opened on 22 January 2009 as the northern terminus of the inaugural section of Line 1 between Mamá Tingó and Centro de los Héroes. It is currently the northern terminus of the line. The following station is Gregorio Urbano Gilbert.

This is an elevated station built above Avenida Hermanas Mirabal. It is named in honor of Mamá Tingó.
