= Centro de los Héroes metro station =

Santo Domingo metro station

Centro de los Héroes

General information
- Location: Santo Domingo; Dominican Republic
- Coordinates: 18°27′02.9″N 69°55′39.7″W
- System: Santo Domingo Metro station
- Line: Line 1

History
- Opened: 22 January 2009

Services
Preceding station	Santo Domingo Metro	Following station
Francisco Alberto Caamaño toward Mamá Tingó	Line 1	Terminus
Location

Centro de los Héroes is a Santo Domingo Metro station and the southern terminus of Line 1. It was open on 22 January 2009 as part of the inaugural section of Line 1 between Mamá Tingó and Centro de los Héroes. The adjacent station is Francisco Alberto Caamañol.

This is an underground station, built below Avenida Enrique Jimenez Moya.
