= Juan José Duarte =

Spanish merchant (1768–1843)

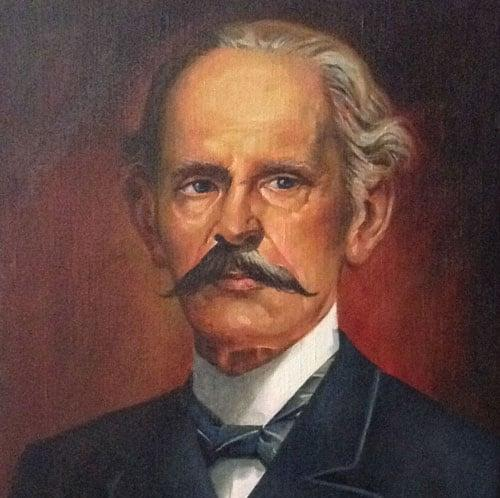
- Portrait of Juan José Duarte
- Born: September 15, 1768; Vejer de la Frontera, Cádiz, Spain
- Died: November 25, 1843 (aged 75); Santo Domingo, Dominican Republic
- Known for: Activist
- Family: Juan Pablo Duarte; Rosa Duarte

Juan José Duarte Rodríguez (September 15, 1768 – November 25, 1843) was a Spanish merchant and early activist for Dominican independence. He was the father of Dominican revolutionary, Juan Pablo Duarte, who is today remembered as the Father of the Nation of the Dominican Republic.

== Early years ==
Juan José Duarte Rodríguez was born in Vejer de la Frontera, Province of Cádiz, Spain, on September 15, 1768, son of Manuel Duarte Jiménez and Ana María Rodríguez Tapia. Not much is known about his childhood and adolescent, but he did, at some point, migrate to Santo Domingo in the 1790s. He came to Santo Domingo from where he left in 1801, towards Mayagüez, when Toussaint Louverture invaded Santo Domingo. He returned to the country in 1809, when Juan Sánchez Ramírez reverted the French occupation after the War of Reconquista. He was able to established himself as a merchant supplier of items for ships, setting up a business in Las Atarazanas.

The family home was in Isabel la Católica, purchased in 1829 from Juan Francisco Santín, also from Seville. Until November 19, 1944, the property belonged to the Duarte family who then sold it to Juan Jiménez “and thus it changed owners until it came into the hands of Manuel J. Barrous who sold it to the State and today it is the headquarters of the Duartiano Institute ”says historian Vetilio Alfau.

He married Manuela Díez Jiménez, with whom he produced 11 children. 3 of these children included Vicente, Juan Pablo, and Rosa Duarte. Juan José Duarte Rodríguez in his will dated August 30, 1843 in Santo Domingo, named only six of his children: Vicente Celestino, Juan Pablo, Filomena, Rosa, María Francisca and Manuel, as his only universal heirs; undoubtedly, the other children had died by that time.

== Activism ==
He was the only foreign merchant who refused to sign a manifesto in support of Jean-Pierre Boyer when he invaded Santo Domingo in 1822, and the one who a year later refused to pay homage to General Charles Riviere-Hérard. In 1843, during the visit of General Hérard to Santo Domingo, Juan José Duarte showed his energy when he refused to let Haitian officers leave a Colombian flag in his house for malicious purposes, Rosa Duarte says.

Don Juan experienced the anguish of his son's persecution and clandestinity to the point of hiding his hiding place even from Francisco del Rosario Sánchez, when Hérard and his men required him on July 12, 1843. Rosa Duarte, who was present during the exchange between her father and Sánchez, writes:

The sorrowful old man did not distrust, He had spent the day with his afflicted family in the greatest tribulation, feeling the bitter persecution that was being done to his most beloved son; and at that time he had not found a safe place to hide him. And at that moment he looked at Sánchez like an envoy of Providence, and shaking the hands that he offered him with such selflessness: “Save him! I don't distrust... tell me where you expect it." Sánchez answered: “in the Plaza del Carmen, in front of my house.”

On November 25, 1843, some few months after Juan Pablo's exile, the elder Duarte suddenly died at the age of 68. His body received a Christian burial in the vault of the Rosario chapel of the parish church of Santa Bárbara, in the city of Santo Domingo.

== Historiography ==
Historian José Gabriel García, a future veteran of the Independence and Restoration wars, described Juan José Duarte with the following:

A man of upright conscience and pure feelings, he did not want to associate his name with a reprehensible act, and by acting with such nobility and nobility, he anticipated the heir of his virtues the glory of later sacrificing his future to give his fellow citizens a homeland. That, lavish towards everyone, only towards him she has not used lavishness or favors.

Juan José Duarte Rodríguez, father of Juan Pablo Duarte, has not been the subject of statues, monuments, or written biographical works in the Dominican Republic. In addition to his relation to Juan Pablo Duarte, he was involved in the independence movement as a revolutionary.

== See also ==
- Juan Pablo Duarte
- Rosa Duarte
- Manuela Díez Jiménez
