= Juan Pablo Duarte =

Dominican Republic's Father of the Nation (1813–1876)

Padre de la Patria Juan Pablo Duarte
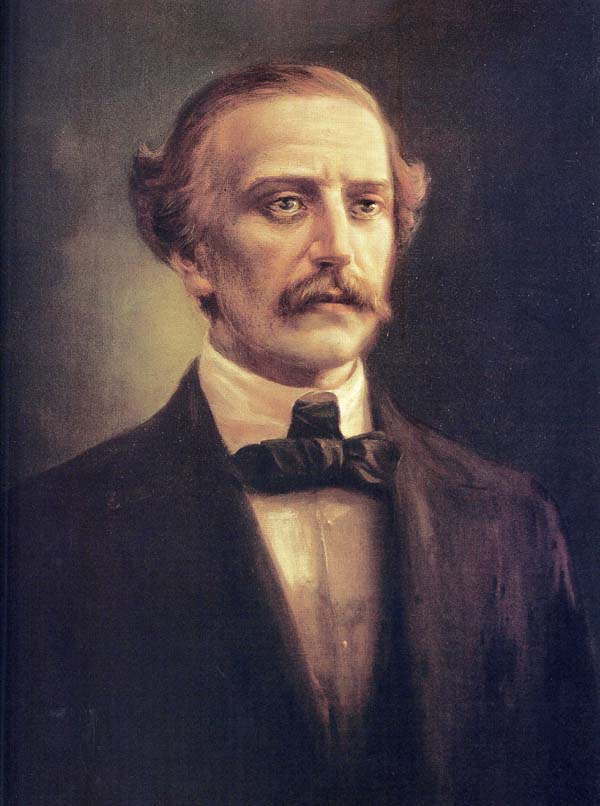
- Oil portrait of Juan Pablo Duarte by Dominican artist Abelardo Rodríguez Urdaneta
- Born: January 26, 1813; Santo Domingo, Captaincy General of Santo Domingo
- Died: July 15, 1876 (aged 63); Caracas, United States of Venezuela
- Resting place: Altar de la Patria
- Occupations: Activist; Writer; Military General; Politician; Educator; Independence leader
- Years active: 1833–1876
- Organization: La Trinitaria
- Title: Father of the Nation
- Political party: Central Government Junta
- Parents: Juan José Duarte (father); Manuela Díez Jiménez (mother)
- Relatives: Vicente Celestino (brother); Maria Josefa (sister); Manuel (brother); Ana Maria (sister); Manuel (brother); Filomena (sister); Rosa (sister); Juana Bautista (sister); Manuel Amáralos María (brother); María Francisca (sister)
- Awards: National hero
- Honours: Order of Merit of Duarte, Sánchez and Mella
- Military career
- Allegiance: Dominican Republic
- Service years: 1834–1876
- Rank: Brigadier General Dominican Army: Liberation Army; Restoration Army
- Conflicts: Reform Revolution; Dominican War of Independence; Dominican Restoration War

Juan Pablo Duarte y Díez (January 26, 1813 – July 15, 1876) was a Dominican military leader, writer, activist, and nationalist politician who was the foremost of the Founding Fathers of the Dominican Republic and bears the title of Father of the Nation. As one of the most celebrated figures in Dominican history, Duarte is considered a folk hero and revolutionary visionary in the modern Dominican Republic, who, along with military generals Matías Ramón Mella and Francisco del Rosario Sánchez, organized and promoted La Trinitaria, a secret society that eventually led to the Dominican revolt and independence from Haitian rule in 1844 and the start of the Dominican War of Independence.

== Early years ==
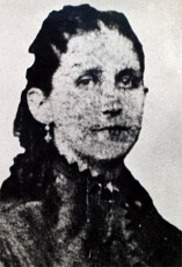
Rosa Duarte

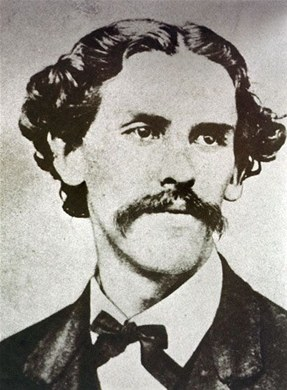
Vicente Calestino Duarte

Duarte was born on January 26, 1813 in Santo Domingo, Captaincy General of Santo Domingo during the period commonly called España Boba. In his memoirs, José María Serra de Castro described a middle aged Duarte as a man with a rosy complexion, sharp features, blue eyes, and a golden hair that contrasted with his thick, dark moustache. Duarte was born into a middle-class family that was dedicated to maritime trade and hardware in the port area of Santo Domingo. His father was Juan José Duarte Rodríguez, a Peninsular from Vejer de la Frontera, Kingdom of Seville, Spain, and his mother was Manuela Díez Jiménez from El Seibo, Captaincy General of Santo Domingo; three of Duarte's grandparents were Europeans. (Note: His paternal grandparents were Manuel Duarte Jiménez and Ana María Rodríguez de Tapia, both from Vejer de la Frontera (Kingdom of Seville, Spain). His maternal grandparents were Antonio Díez Baillo, from Osorno la Mayor (Province of Toro, Spain), and Rufina Jiménez Benítez, who was born in El Seybo (Captaincy General of Santo Domingo, New Spain).) Duarte had 9 siblings: his eldest brother, Vicente Celestino Duarte (1802–1865), a tall, long-haired brunette man, was a store owner, woodcutter and cattle rancher who was born in Mayagüez, Puerto Rico; one of Duarte's sisters was Rosa Protomártir Duarte (1820–1888), a performer who collaborated with him within the Independence movement.

In 1801, the Duarte family migrated from Santo Domingo to Mayagüez, Puerto Rico. They were evading the unrest caused by the Haitian Revolution on the island. Many Dominican families left the island during this period. At the time, Puerto Rico was still a Spanish colony, and Mayagüez, being so close to Hispaniola, across the Mona Passage, had become a refuge for wealthy migrants from Santo Domingo. Migrants such as the Duartes and other natives born on the Spanish side who did not accept Haitian dictatorship, moved there.

Toussaint Louverture, governor of Saint-Domingue (now Haiti), a former colony of France located on the western third of Hispaniola, arrived to the capital of Santo Domingo the previous year and proclaimed the end of slavery (although the changes were not permanent). At the time, France and Saint-Domingue (the western third of the island), were going through exhaustive social movements, namely, the French Revolution and the Haitian Revolution. In occupying the Spanish side of the island, Louverture was using the previous agreements between the governments of France and Spain in the Peace of Basel signed in 1795, which had given the Spanish area to France. Louverture wanted to convert the old Spanish institutions to French and re-establish the plantation economy on both sides of the island. Upon arrival in Santo Domingo Norte, Louverture immediately sought to abolish slavery in Dominican territory. Ultimately, slavery was abolished in 1822 during the Haitian occupation of Santo Domingo.

Most scholars assume that the Duartes' first son, Vicente Celestino, was born on the eastern side of the Mona Passage. The family returned to Santo Domingo in 1809, after the Spanish reconquest of Santo Domingo, led by governor-general Juan Sánchez Ramírez, that crushed French rule in Santo Domingo, returning it to Spanish rule. In 1819, Duarte enrolled in Manuel Aybar's school where he learned reading, writing, grammar and arithmetic. Due to the closure of the university by the Haitian authorities, he became a disciple of Juan Vicente Moscoso from whom he obtained his higher education in Latin, philosophy and law. After the Moscoso's exile to Cuba, he was succeeded by the priest Gaspar Hernández.

== Ephemeral Independence ==
=== First Dominican independence, 1821 ===
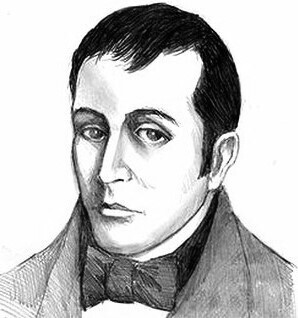
The first movement was organized by José Núñez de Cáceres, who in turn became the first and only governor of Republic of Spanish Haiti from 1821 to 1822

In December 1821, when Duarte was eight years old, members of a Creole elite of Santo Domingo's capital proclaimed its independence from Spanish rule, calling themselves Haití Español. Historians today call this elite's brief courtship with sovereignty the Ephemeral Independence. The most prominent leader of the coup against Spanish colonial government was one of its former supporters, José Núñez de Cáceres. These individuals were tired of being ignored by the Crown, and some were also concerned with the new liberal turn in Madrid.

The 1820s was a time of profound political changes throughout the entire Spanish Atlantic World, which directly affected the lives of the middle-class like the Duartes. It began with the conflict period between Spanish royalists and liberals in the Iberian Peninsula, which is known today as Trienio Liberal. American patriots in arms, like Simón Bolívar in South America, immediately reaped the fruits of Spain's destabilization, and began pushing back colonial troops. Even conservative elites in New Spain (like Agustín de Iturbide in Mexico), who had no intention of being ruled by Spanish anticlericals, moved to break ties with the Spanish crown.

Many others in Santo Domingo wanted independence from Spain. Inspired by the revolution and independence on the island, Dominicans mounted a number of movements and conspiracies against slavery and colonialism, from 1809 to 1821.

The Cáceres' provisional government requested support from Simón Bolivar's new government, but their petition was ignored due to the internal conflicts of the Gran Colombia.

=== Annexation by Haiti ===
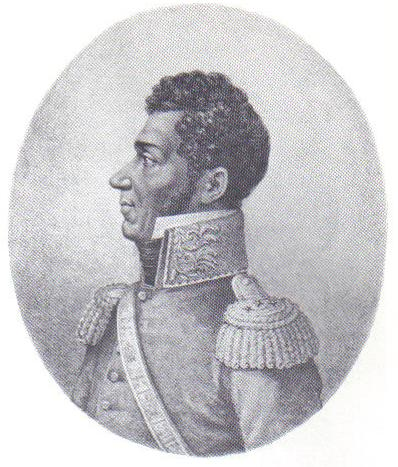
Jean-Pierre Boyer, the ruler of Haiti

Meanwhile, a plan for unification with Haiti grew stronger. Haitian politicians wanted to keep the island out of the hands of European imperial powers and sought to find a way to safeguard the Haitian Revolution. Haiti's President, Jean-Pierre Boyer, sent an army that took over the eastern portion of Hispaniola. The Spaniards residing in Santo Domingo, especially those of Catalan origin, welcomed the country's incorporation into the Republic of Haiti. Thus, when Boyer arrived in the city at the head of his troops, the Spanish traders sent him a letter in which they adhered to the new order that was implemented. Duarte's father was one of the Spanish merchants in the city who refused to sign the document and, according to several documents, chose to get involved in separatist conspiracies during the initial years of Haitian domination, though that movement never materialized.

On January 6, 1823, Boyer decreed that all young men between the ages of 16 and 25 would be drafted into the Haitian army. This measure caused the University of Santo Domingo to lose its students close its doors. On November 14, 1824, Boyer established French as the official, sole and obligatory language in the acts of the Courts, the Civil Registry and public notaries throughout the island. Struggles between Boyer and the old colonial helped produce a migration of planters and elite. Following the bourgeoisie custom of sending promising sons abroad for education, the Duartes sent Juan Pablo to the United States and Europe in 1828.

=== Revolutionary origins ===
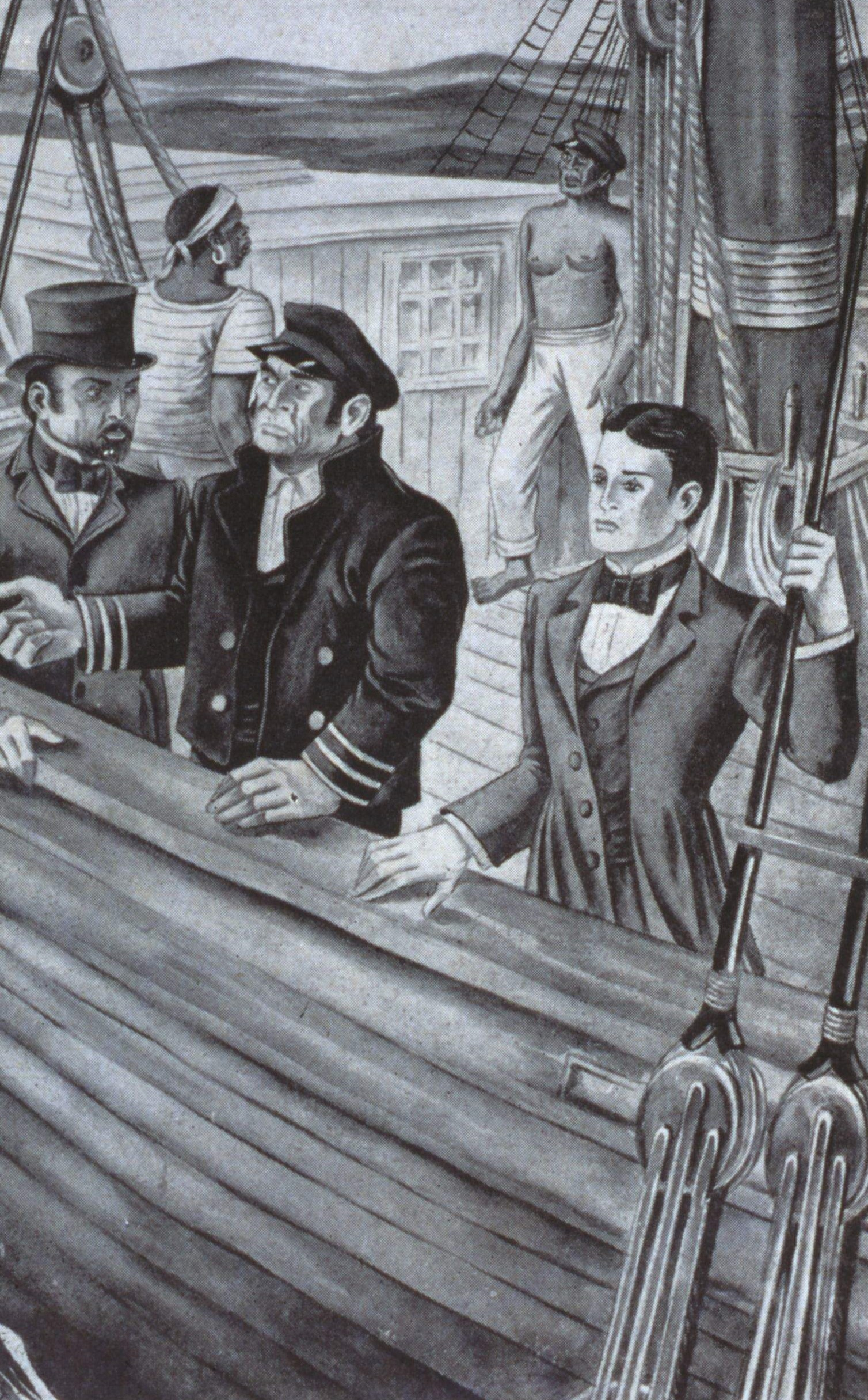
Duarte, then 15 years old, sets sail on his trip to North America and Europe.

On the way to the United States and Europe, Duarte was accompanied by Pablo Pujols, a Catalan merchant who was also a family friend of the Duartes. Pujols had lived in the area for some time and agreed to be young Duarte's tutor. However, as Duarte boarded the ship, the captain reproached the two travelers because the Spanish part of the island was now living under Haitian domination. He even asserted that he would only board them if Duarte told him that he felt no shame in being "Haitian". Although Duarte responded that he was Dominican, the captain harshly boasted that the Dominicans were cowards for submitting to the Haitian yoke, and therefore, was undeserving of an identity, expressing: "You have no name, because neither you nor your parents deserve to have one, because, cowardly and servile, they bow their heads under the time of their slaves." This moment completely moved the still teenaged Duarte, who would readdress years later that these humiliating words led him at that very moment resolve to fight for Dominican Independence. He then assured the captain that he would not rest until his people were free.

== Era of Enlightenment ==
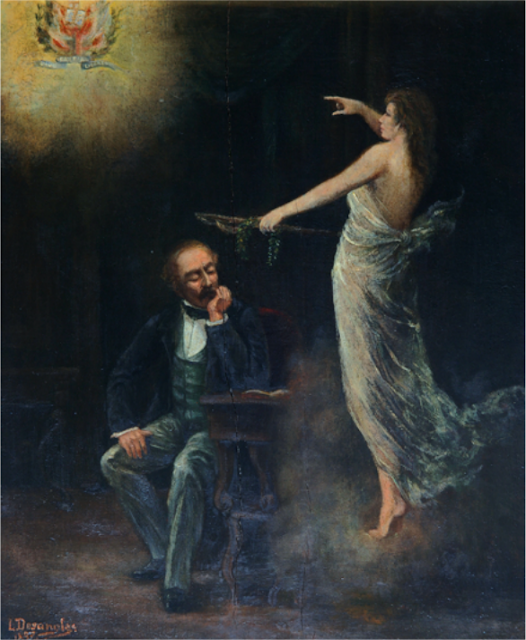
Engraving of Duarte envisioning the establishment of an independent nation by Dominican painter Luis Desangles, c. 1889

Duarte left the country for the first as a teenager. Before coming to Europe, where he would go to study, he spent a brief time in the United States. Although it is believed that he entered North America through New York, another version indicates that he did so through Providence, Rhode Island, on July 2, 1829, and that from there he went to New York. There, he studied English, a language Mr. Groot had introduced him to in Santo Domingo. In addition, as mentioned by Rosa Duarte in Notes, he began to study Universal Geography with Mr. W. Davis, who gave him classes at his home. According to historian Pedro Troncoso Sánchez, while in Southampton, England, Duarte would study philosophy, history, law, political science and geography. From Southampton, he continued on to France, where he arrived at Le Havre and then traveled to Paris. It was here that he perfected his French, a language first introduced to him by Monsieur Bruat in Santo Domingo. While attending a banquet in Hamburg through a lodge called Oriente, he was introduced to Freemasonry, absorbing the ideals of liberty, equality and fraternity.

In Europe, engulfed in the era of romanticism, liberalism, nationalism and utopian socialism, numerous political and social events had shook several European nations in the second and third decades of the 19th century. After Napoleon's invasion of Spain in 1808, Duarte was curious to learn of the events in Argentina, Colombia, Ecuador, Venezuela and Mexico, further influencing his liberal ideals towards his own country. Duarte presumably knew that the Spanish soldier and politician Rafael del Riego had fought against the French occupation of Spain in 1808. The Spanish events of 1808 and the circumstances around the death of General Riego in 1823 were presumably discussed upon his arrival in Spain in 1828.

Also upon Duarte's arrival in Spain, the events of the Liberal Triennium (1820–1823) were still fresh. The fight for independence in America, the support of Ferdinand VII for the return to absolutism and the invasion of the Hundred Thousand Sons of Saint Louis sponsored by the Holy Alliance, caused the collapse of the liberal government and the return to absolutism on October 1, 1823. When Duarte was in Spain, the events of the July Revolution of 1830 occurred in Paris. The figure of the Spanish liberal José de Espronceda was disseminated in the trenches. This allowed liberalism in France to achieve victory against the conservatives who advocated that the Bourbons will continue with the absolutist regime.

Having thrown himself into scenes of European radicalism, Duarte himself witnessed new regimes of liberty that had risen after the French Revolution. He was intrigued by new changes in Germany and France, but none caught his interest more than that of Spain, where reforms were introduced by Cortes of Cádiz. Duarte would remain in Barcelona for the rest of his travels, where it is believed that he studied law. According to military historian Rafael Percival Peña, Duarte also acquired military training during his time in Spain.

While in Europe, Duarte understood that the Dominican people had their own identity as well as the absolute right to bring about political independence. Since the beginning of the 16th century, the Dominicans, despite economic disadvantages, had a history of rebelling and winning battles against Dutch, British, French and Spanish forces (the latter two of which were expelled from Santo Domingo by Dominican rebels in 1809 and 1821 respectively). Duarte firmly believed that the Dominicans would now have to rebel against the Haitians. Upon the success of this goal, the newly independent nation would be organized on the basis of the institutionalization of representative democracy. Having formalized these ideals, Duarte returned to his homeland in 1833. From Barcelona, he arrived in Puerto Rico, then to Saint Thomas, and finally to his native country.

Duarte returned to his hometown of Santo Domingo and devoted himself to implementing his newly formed ideals while working in his father's business. According to historian Orlando Inoa, and backed by records from the Grand Oriente of Haiti chartered lodge Constante Union No. 8, Duarte became a free-mason at the legal age of 21. He was said to have been appointed as the Architect Decorator of this lodge. It is believed by some historians that some of his key collaborators were also members of this lodge. Duarte joined the Haitian National Guard and furthered his military training and studied the military tactics of occupying forces, where he reached the rank of colonel.

Duarte lead an intense social life that allowed him to come into contact with many important sectors of urban communities. He witnessed marriages, sponsors, baptisms and attended cultural meetings. His societal experiences helped him realize that the general population was increasingly patriotic to Dominican ideals and that there was a historic movement of reluctance towards the increasingly despotic Haitian rule.

Duarte's ideas were echoed within the middle class. For four consecutive years, from 1834 to 1838, he offered language and mathematics classes to a group of young people who went every afternoon to a warehouse on La Atarazana street. Duarte's popularity grew and many of his disciples began to feel a strong attachment to him. In a short time, the La Atarazana warehouse became the headquarters of a revolutionary movement. Duarte's teachings sought to separate the Dominican and Haitian parts of the island. These ideas were enthusiastically received by his students.

== Struggle for independence ==
Thanks to Duarte, a traditionalist reaction led by young people headed toward the formation of a democratic-revolutionary nucleus. The repudiation of oppression, without commitment to the past, made them receptive to Duarte's preaching. Under the guidance of Duarte, a revolutionary organization formed years later. These activities were strengthened upon the arrival of Peruvian priest Gaspar Hernández, who was appointed parish priest of San Carlos in 1842. Hernandez, with high intellectual training, organized a philosophy study group but ultimately had no responsibility in the patriotic and revolutionary leadership as he was a supporter of the return to Spanish rule.

=== Founding of La Trinitaria ===
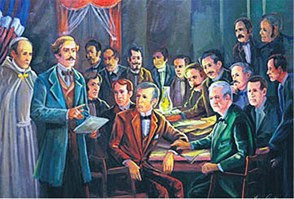
Meeting of La Trinitaria at Duarte's house

On July 16, 1838, on Arzobispo Nouel Street in front of the Church of Carmen) Duarte and others established a secret patriotic society called La Trinitaria, which helped undermine Haitian occupation. Named after the Holy Trinity, this movement was described by his sister Rosa as a youth movement due to the age of its participants. Some of its first members included Juan Isidro Pérez, Pedro Alejandro Pina, Jacinto de la Concha, Félix María Ruiz, José María Serra, Benito González, Felipe Alfau and Juan Nepomuceno Ravelo. La Trinitaria was an organization that had no precedent in the country. This was the first revolutionary group animated by a political doctrine, with both a program and an organizational system in this area. Its justification lay in realizing the objective that Duarte had preached: overthrowing Haitian rule to found an independent State. As can be read in the oath, the entity was organized around fidelity to the person of Duarte. The teachings of the founding father summarized the doctrine and program of the society. The Trinitarian movement, said his sister Rosa Duarte, was known as the "boys' revolution" because of the age of its constituents. Conservatives viewed them with distrust and ridicule for their disinterested idealism. They coined the derogatory neologism "filorios", a word that came from philosophers, which meant to denote that they were romantics lacking realism.

Contrary to this vision, Duarte provided La Trinitaria with the practical and organizational resources necessary to achieve its objectives. You can associate La Trinitaria with the Masonic tradition and the libertarian organizations of the Mediterranean countries that advocated the implementation of liberal regimes, such as the Carbonarians of Italy. Its main distinguishing feature was the secrecy that was to guide the activities. It was equipped with a cellular organization, according to which each nucleus of conspirators had to exist as a body independent of the rest. It was conceived, therefore, as a chain of conspirators that converged in the first initiates: each of them had to create a cell with two more members and, in turn, each of these created other cells with the incorporation of two new adepts. But each member only had to know the members of the cells to which he belonged.

==== La Filantrópica and La Dramática ====
Later, Duarte and others founded a society called La Filantrópica, which had a more public presence, seeking to spread veiled ideas of liberation through theatrical stages. This group went by the motto Peace, Union, and Friendship. Some of their plays included: Free Rome by Italian playwright Vittorio Alfieri, La Viuda de Padilla by Francisco Martínez de la Rosa, A Day of the year 23 in Cádiz by Eugenio de Ochoa. The Haitian governor, Bernard-Philippe-Alexis Carrié, at first, wasn't suspicious, so he ignored the performances. When the public flocked to the theater with enthusiasm and the when actors caused delirium in the audience, Alexis Carrié was alerted by his spies. The first impulse of the occupation authorities was to suspend the activities of the movement and close the theater. After Alexis Carrié was notified and several failed attempts, the unsatisfied Trinitarios founded a new society, La Dramática. In this society, all the members devoted themselves to acting. Many people enjoyed these activities and learned through the representation of theatrical works they directed. They staged productions of peoples struggling to free themselves from an oppressive government.

=== Brief alliance with the Haitians ===
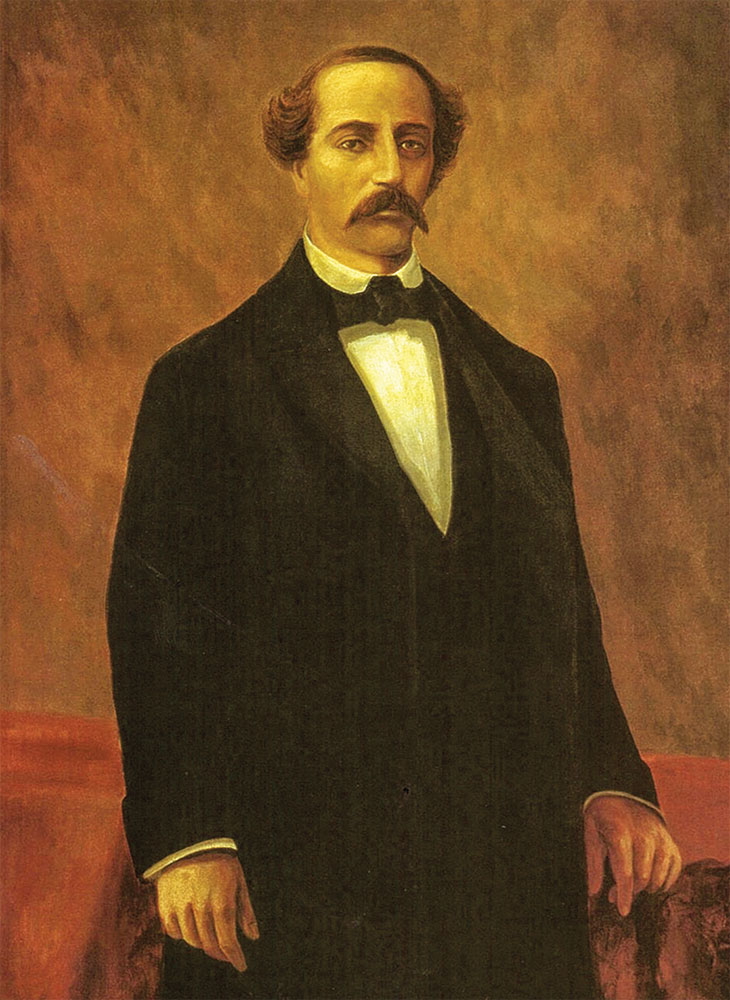
Juan Pablo Duarte, Oil on canvas, completed in 1887 Supposedly the second of two Duarte paintings produced by Bonilla in 1887.

The years 1842 and 1843 are defining for the creation of favorable conditions that led to the moment for Dominican independence. Catastrophic natural phenomena, such as the earthquake that affected Haiti on May 7, 1842, left the cities of Cap-Haïtian, Santiago, and other northern cities destroyed. Nearly 5,000 deaths were recorded and accusations of incapacity and insensitivity on behalf of the authorities while handling the aftermath of the event influenced the beginning of their political deterioration. A fire in Port-au-Prince that left it in ruins in January 1843 and political unrest combined with shortages and economic-commercial crisis accompanied The catastrophes. The political attrition of Jean-Pierre Boyer produced ruptures within Haiti and the eastern part of the island. On the eastern side of the island, separatist movements sought to overthrow Boyer. On the other side, people to make the Spanish part of the island take the opportunity to gain independence.

There were coincidences and differences in purposes. For Duarte, he felt that since the Trinitarios could not manage to transfer its influence from the circle of young people to the upper urban sector, a larger demonstration needed to take place. This allowed them to shift their attentions towards a new movement: La Reforma. Upon learning of the conspiracy led by deposed liberal deputies in Les Cayes and other parts of the South, Duarte arranged for Matías Ramón Mella to move to the southern region and reach agreements with Boyer's enemies. Mella fulfilled his duty and, after a brief visit, returned to Santo Domingo a day before the January 27, 1843 insurrection. After military operations, Boyer resigned on March 13, 1843.

Nearly two weeks after Boyer's resignation, news reached Santo Domingo about Boyer's fall. Following this, a mobilization of the Trinitarios and the Haitian liberals residing in the city hurled into the streets in repudiation of despotism and hailed Dominican triumph. The conservatives, however, were disturbed by this union, accusing Duarte of being "Colombian," alluding to the prior independence leader, José Núñez de Caceres. In response to this, Duarte strongly emphasized that he was not seeking independence, but reformation. Duarte, who wanted to carry out his plan discretely, alluded to this so that he would not have to publicly speak of the true conditions of proclamation for independence.

Meanwhile, the Haitian authorities of the city, headed by Governor Carrié, opposed the popular movement. A shootout occurred in the Plaza de Armas (today Parque Colón) when the crowd approached his residence demanding his resignation. Many protesters hid, while others, like Duarte, marched towards San Cristóbal, where important conspirators were located. There, they received reinforcements from the south, causing Carrié to resign from office. Étienne Desgrotte, the leader of the Haitian liberals in Santo Domingo, was appointed governor. After this, a popular board was formed by Alcius Ponthieux, who assigned Duarte in addition to Pedro Alejandro Piña and Manuel Jiménes, as members to the board. Duarte was entrusted with the mission of expanding the work to the localities from the east.

Divergences soon emerged between the Haitian and Dominican liberals. When holding elections for legislative representatives, three parties competed: the Dominican conservatives, the Dominican liberals and the Haitian liberals. Despite the tepid relationship that the Trinidadians had with the populace, they triumphed in these elections because they embodied the desire for Dominican freedom. Additionally, days before requesting Haitian authorities write the official documents in Spanish, the Dominicans demanded that they would not be treated as a conquered people. This alerted Haitian liberals about what the Dominicans were after.

Despite the struggle between liberals and conservatives, some conservatives understood that it was necessary to reach an agreement with the Trinitarios, since the liberals alone lacked the strength to break ties with Haiti. Meetings were held between Duarte and conservative personalities in search of unity of action. The conservatives demanded concessions contrary to Dominican sovereignty that Duarte considered inadmissible, and the negotiations reached a stalemate. The Trinitarios, however, continued to try to gather support and refused to renounce unity, as long as the objective of a fully independent State was maintained. Duarte himself, in the work of the Popular Board, managed to incorporate the brothers Ramón and Pedro Santana. These were two of the most influential landowners in the eastern region and were recognized for their opposition to the Haitian yoke. Duarte spoke with a patrioticly incline Ramón Santana. Ramón was asked to be named colonel, but declined. He had understood that the position would correspond to his brother Pedro who had an aptness for command. Duarte later sent Sánchez to ratify the agreement, as he was a personal friend of the Santana brothers. This shows that, despite the dispute between the Trinitarians and the French, agreements were made between all parties involved.

== Birth of a new nation ==
=== First exile and declaration of independence ===
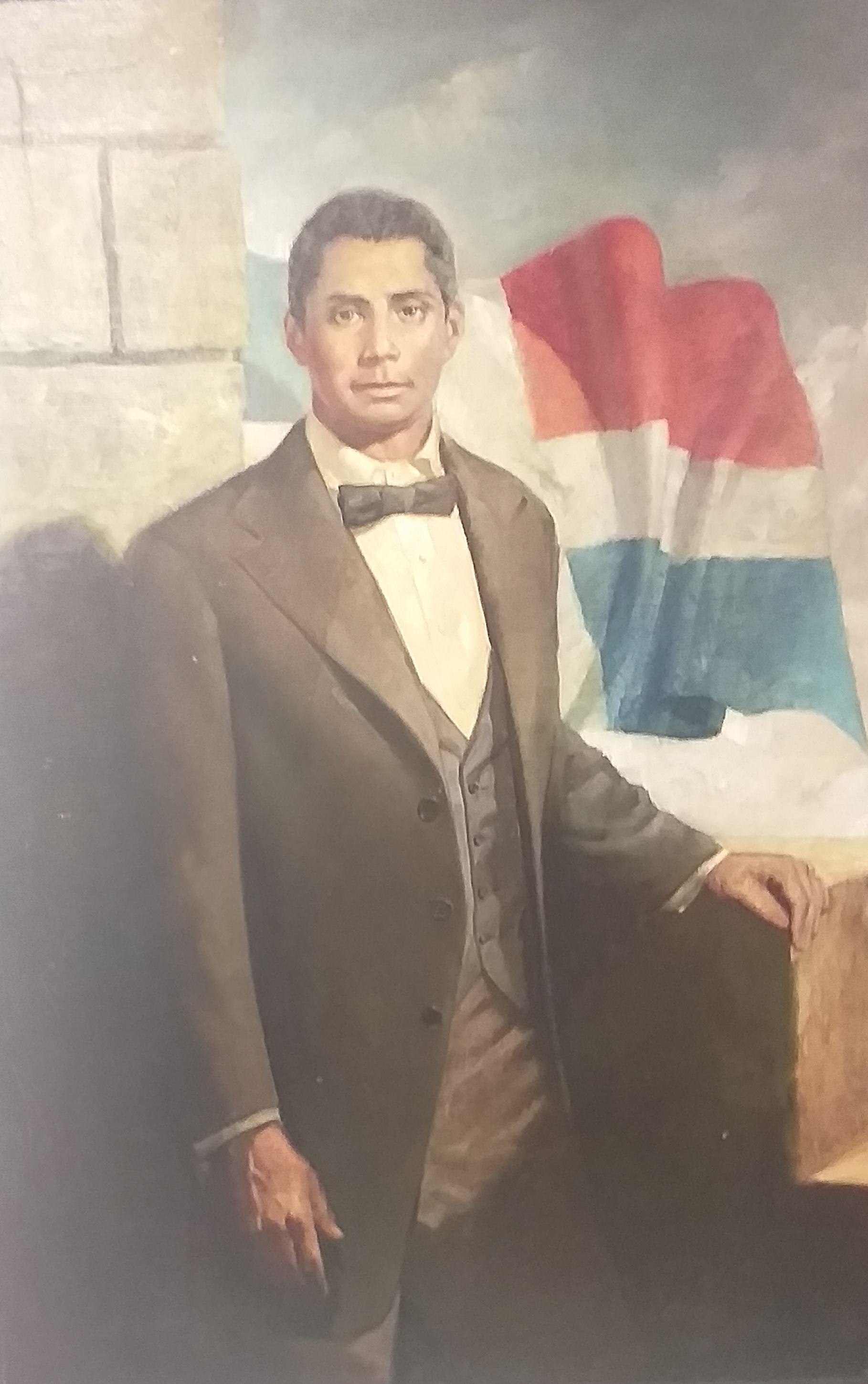
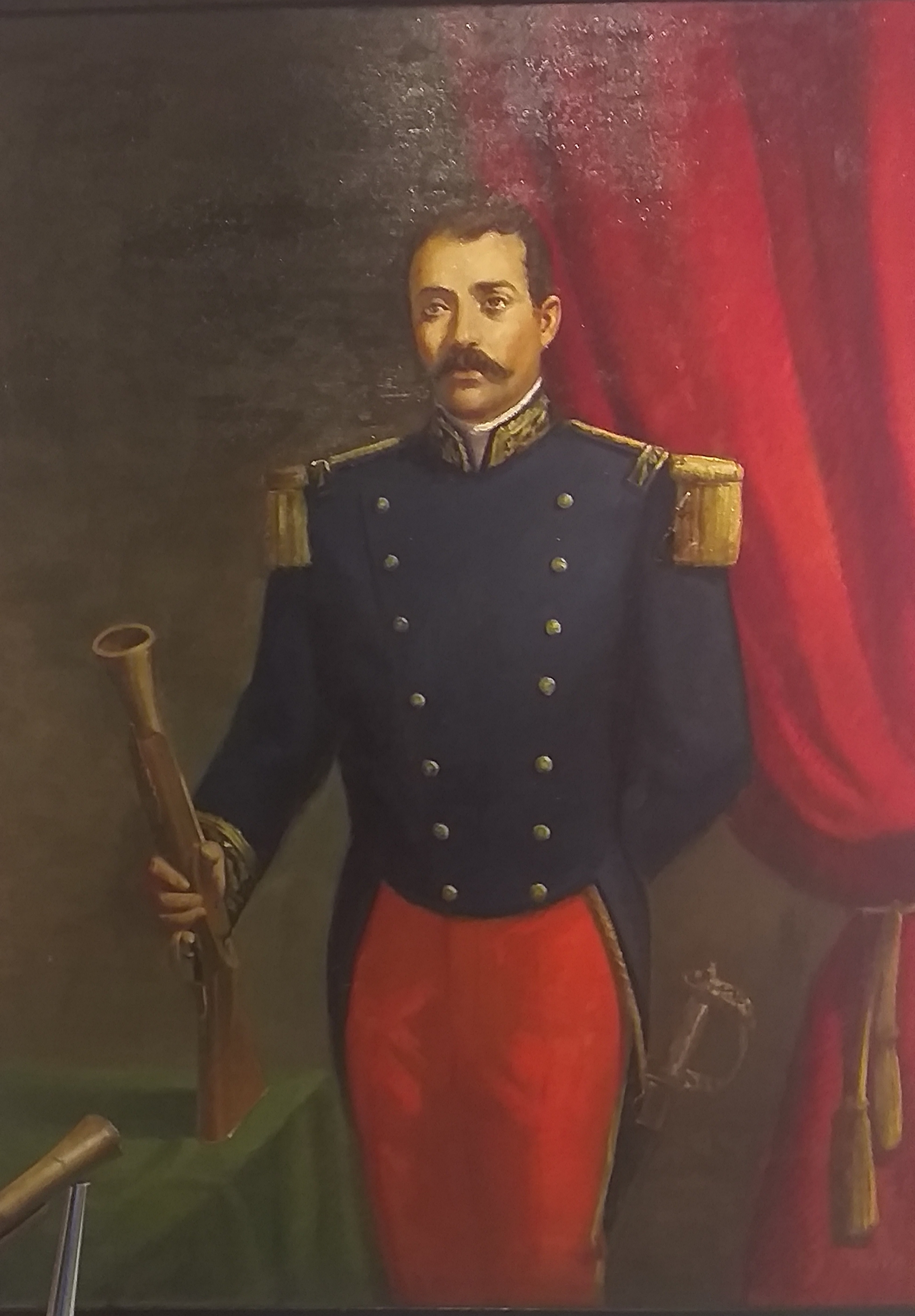
Following Duarte's exile, Francisco del Rosario Sánchez (left) and Matías Ramón Mella (right) continued to lead the 1844 revolution.

This alliance of purposes did not last long. Duarte's true intentions reached Charles Rivière-Hérard, who responded with the call of repression of the revolutionaries on the eastern side of the island. The fights started as a result of these differences produced the reaction of the new Haitian government and under the command of Hérard. He launched an offensive against the Trinitarios, commanding two battalions that accompanied him from the city of Port-au-Prince.

In July 1843, the military forces of the Haitian Government intensified the persecution against the Trinitarios. On July 24, 1843, Juan Pablo Duarte's residence, who was living with José Díez, was raided by Haitian soldiers who were trying to locate the Trinitarian leader. The requisition was led by the Haitian commander Hipólito Franquil, who, according to Rosa Duarte, "was accompanied by a large troop of which one part surrounded the block and the other entered the house divided into two rows of two in background; a line of armed soldiers entered through the main bedroom into the inner rooms; and the other extended from the street through the room to the corrals". That day, Duarte and several of his companions managed to escape by jumping through the patios of neighboring residences until they reached the house of Teodoro Ariza. They later moved to Pajarito, (present day Villa Duarte, Santo Domingo Este), where they took refuge in the house of Spanish citizen Pascual C. López. They left there at 10 p.m. that same day. Eventually, Duarte had received information from one of his "repentant persecutors" that there was a price on his head. The informer suggested that he leave Santo Domingo and relayed that the Haitian government would pay three thousand pesos and bestow the rank of colonel to the captor "for the leader of the revolution". Many believed that the amount of the offer was low. Duarte and Pedro Alejandrino Pina left the Pedro Cote residence, in the company of Juan Alejandro Acosta and one other unidentified friend. On August 2, 1843, Duarte decided to leave the island for Curaçao where he received the news of his father's death on November 25. Duarte then told his mother to sell the family business to finance the separatist revolution, to which his mother was opposed to at first.

In his absence, Francisco del Rosario Sánchez had to take the reins of the separatist movement and make an alliance with the conservative sector headed by Tomás Bobadilla and Buenaventura Báez, resulting in the Manifesto of January 16, 1844. The separatist movement, along with the help of those that would rid Dominicans of Haitian rule, succeeded. The Dominicans successfully expelled the Haitians out of the country, leading to the proclamation of independence on February 27, 1844. In accordance to Duarte's wishes, a new republican government free of foreign control was established, and Independent Santo Domingo was officially renamed as the Dominican Republic.

=== First return to Dominican Republic ===
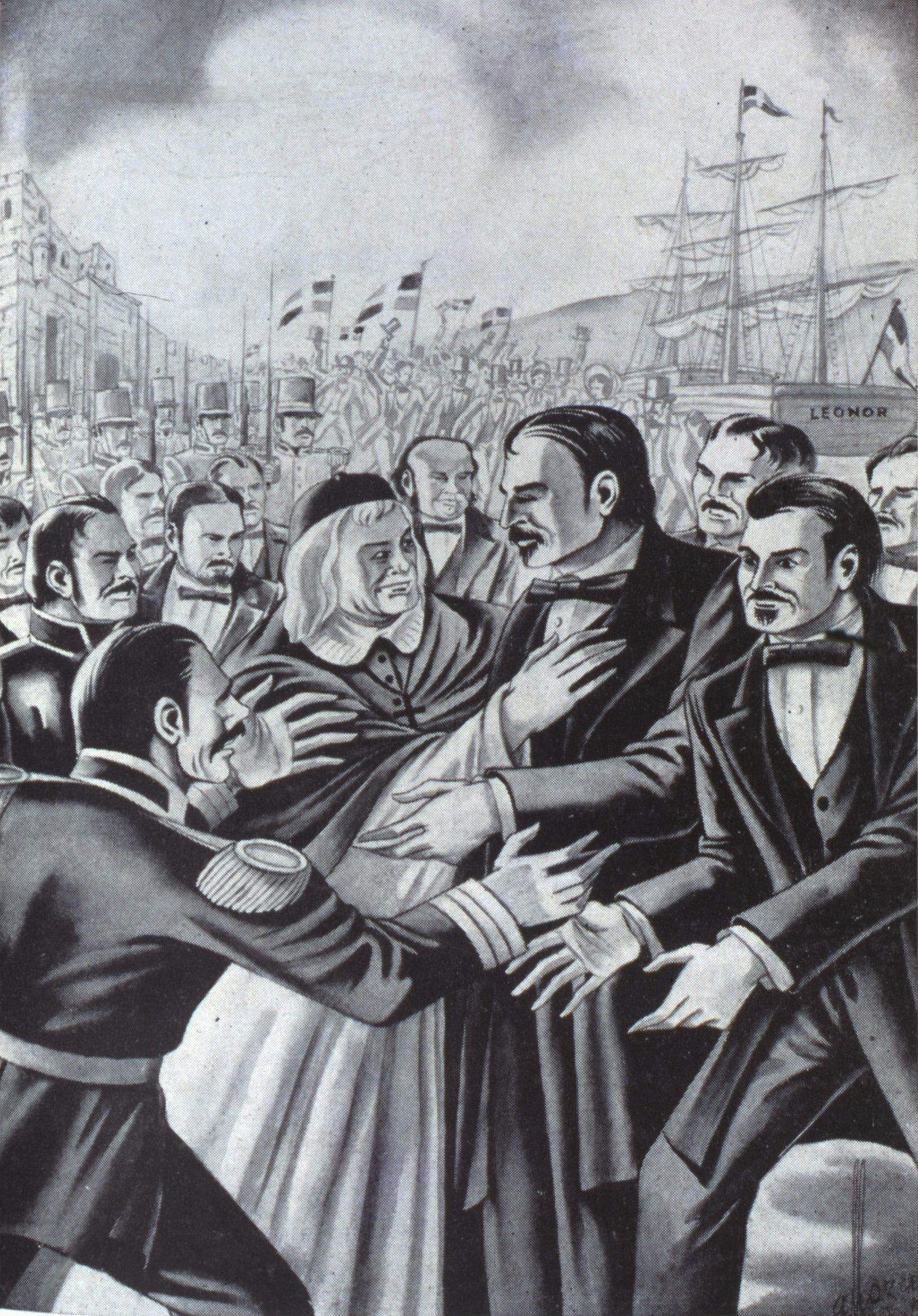
Duarte returns to his homeland

A commission was formed with the purpose of preparing for the return of Duarte, headed by Juan Nepomuceno Ravelo. On March 15, 1844, Duarte entered the Port of Santo Domingo, where he was well received by the people. With him, he brought weapons and war materials that obtained while in Curaçao. Great joy spread among his followers and a procession paid him the honors of a head of state. Archbishop Tomás de Portes e Infante greeted the Patrician with these effusive words: "Save the Father of the Nation!" Duarte was proclaimed General in Chief of the Armies of the Republic. The Government, however, appointed him Brigadier General and Member of the Central Government Board. Duarte began developing a Constitution, which he ultimately left unfinished to join the army and face the Haitians in the Battle of Azua, on March 19, 1844. During the development of this battle, contradictions began between Santana and Duarte. Santana, an influential herd owner, had little military experience and this was the first time facing such a powerful army. Duarte considered it imperative to obtain a resounding military success against the Haitians, and asked to be appointed to the southern front, where he was assigned as a general associated with Santana. Already in Baní, Duarte advocated an offensive tactic that was rejected by Santana, who preferred defensive military postures. Duarte's subordinate officers encouraged him to take the offensive on his own, ignoring Santana's position, but he preferred to follow the instructions of the Government Board. Given the disagreements with Santana, on April 4, the Board summoned him back to Santo Domingo, in obvious disapproval of his position. Despite that, Santana defeated the Haitians in the development of this battle. News reached the capital city that the Haitians were advancing towards the Cibao area. On March 30, 1844, the Battle of Santiago took place and after long hours of combat, the Dominican forces inflicted a crushing defeat on Haitian forces.

=== Drafted constitution of 1844 ===
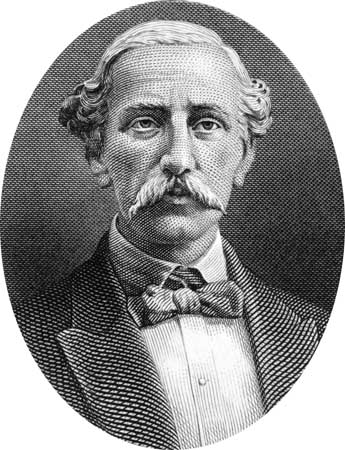
Engraving of Juan Pablo Duarte

Duarte's presidential candidacy was supported by many and Mella declared him president, wanting Duearte to claim himself as the Dominican leader. Duarte declined, arguing that he would only accept if the majority of Dominicans voted in his favor. Instead, Tomas Bobadilla took office. Duarte had a definite concept of the new Dominican, republic nation that was republican, abolitionist, anticolonial, liberal and included progressive patriotism.

In 1844, Duarte drafted a constitution that clearly stated that the Dominican flag could shelter all races, without excluding or giving predominance to any. In his proposed constitution, Duarte wrote that National Independence was the source of liberties and raised the need for Dominicans to have a fundamental law in order to govern. Duarte expressed his most advanced conception regarding the organization of the State as a supreme organ of power.

One of the most important provisions contained in Duarte's draft Constitution says, among other things:

-No power on earth is unlimited, not even that of the law-

-All Dominican power is and should always be limited by law and this by justice, which consists of giving each one what rightfully belongs to them-

A critical part of Duarte's draft was the Powers of the State, whose division would be in tripartite form in three parts, putting the Municipal Power together with the Legislative, judicial and Executive powers. It was intended to prevent rulers from making use of unlimited power, which could harm majorities.

The constitutional ideas embodied in his Draft Constitution reflected the influence of the European ideologies of the 18th and 19th centuries. The conceptions expressed in this project allude that Duarte knew the works "The Social Contract," by Jean-Jacques Rousseau and "The Spirit of the Laws" by Montesquieu. In addition, American thinkers who inspired the United States Constitution of 1787 influenced the formation of Duarte's ideals, such as Thomas Jefferson and Thomas Paine.

=== Clashes with the Central Government Board ===
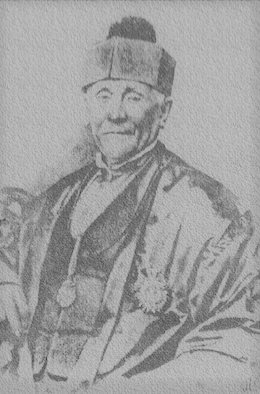
Immediately following Duarte's arrival on the island, tensions arose with the new government, under Tomás Bobadilla (pictured), who intended to seek a protectorate under France.

While these events were taking place, differences within the government continued to develop, as the group of conservatives continued their conspiracies for new protectorate plans. The Trinitarios, motivated by the fear incurred by this situation, requested that Duarte be appointed General in Chief of the Army and other positions for Trinitarios. Thanks to the conservative hegemony in the Central Government Board, on March 8, that body had taken the resolution to partially adopt a plan that had been outlined in the capital of Haiti by the consul general of France and several Dominican representatives when they were participating in the Constituent Assembly that had been held as a result of the triumph of the Reform Revolution. The Levausser Plan stipulated the appointment of a French governor as executive of the Dominican State, with which the country would remain in the status of French protectorate. It also stipulated the cession to France in perpetuity of the Samaná Peninsula and active aid to France in the event that it decided to reconquer its former colony in the west of the island. The justification for this resolution was based on the Haitian military threat. In the months of March to May, the conservative leaders placed all their expectations on French aid. Sánchez foresaw that several of the conservatives could lose their lives in the movement and warned them of the scope of the plan so that they would have time to seek asylum in the French consulate, as several later did.

In May 1844, the Trinitarios initiated the plan to overthrow the members of the Central Government Board as they endangered national sovereignty. As part of the project, on May 31, 1844, Duarte and a group of his followers began a plan to take positions of power in the emerging Dominican Republic, as it had fallen into the hands of conservative groups represented by the President of the Central Government Board, Tomás Bobadilla, who favored the idea that the Nation should become a protectorate of France.

That same day, Duarte and a group of followers met with the garrison of Ozama Fortress, and managed to get 56 active officers to sign a document addressed to the Central Government Board requesting that Duarte be named General in Chief of the Army and the other Trinitarios, including Sánchez and Mella, be named Division or Brigadier Generals. The only one who was accepted for promotion was José Joaquín Puello, however some Seybanos, along with the friends and supporters of Major General Santana, were outraged by the requests and spoke out against it. This caused the Board to postpone the Duartistas' request. On June 1, 1844, Duarte rejoined the Board, now headed by President José María Caminero, and signed the request for protection and recognition of independence by France. The new request for the French protectorate no longer included the transfer of the Samaná peninsula in perpetuity, instead, it was replaced by a provisional occupation by French forces of Samaná bay if necessary.

=== 18 Dominican Brumaire ===
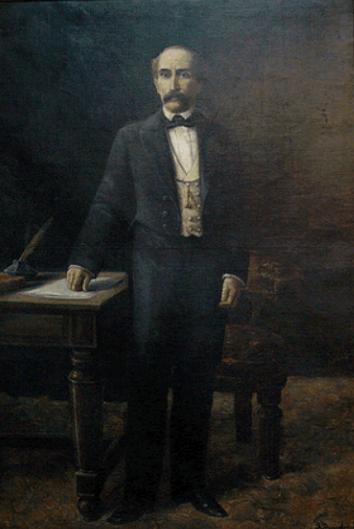
Painting of Duarte by Dominican painter Luis Desangles

Secretly, Duarte and Puello formed a conspiracy that would stage a coup to overthrow Caminero. Duarte and Puello had the support of between 150 and 200 officers who had been former slaves. These freedman joined their entourage because they were convinced that their freedom was threatened by the Board after the Duartistas told them that supporters of the protectorate wanted to sell the country to the French and restore slavery. Duarte was in a position to carry out the coup, since Brigadier General Ramón Santana, who was feared by Puello's supporters, was in a critical state of health, and in addition, the French warship Naiade was absent.

On June 31, 1844 in the morning, Duarte gave a speech to the troops gathered in the arsenal of the Ozama Fortress and the officers of his General Staff where he proclaimed Puello as brigadier general and in turn, proclaimed Duarte as inspector general of the Dominican troops. General Puello took charge of the city and moved to the Junta upon hearing the shouts: "Down with Bobadilla!" Down Caminero! Death to the traitors! "Death to Delmonte, Javier Abreu, Francisco Ruiz and Báez!" The commander of the department of Santo Domingo, Manuel Jimenes, decided to appear before the Board to obtain from it, the ratification of the coup, along with the expulsion of Caminero and Bobadilla, forcing them to sign a ban list. Duarte and Puello then led twenty officers to the Junta and there, in the name of the people and the troops, they imposed their appointments, obtaining, almost without resistance, the sanction of everything they had just done.

This new Junta, now headed by Sánchez, would introduce Pérez and Pina among its members. Duarte was now in control of the government.

=== Proclamation as president ===
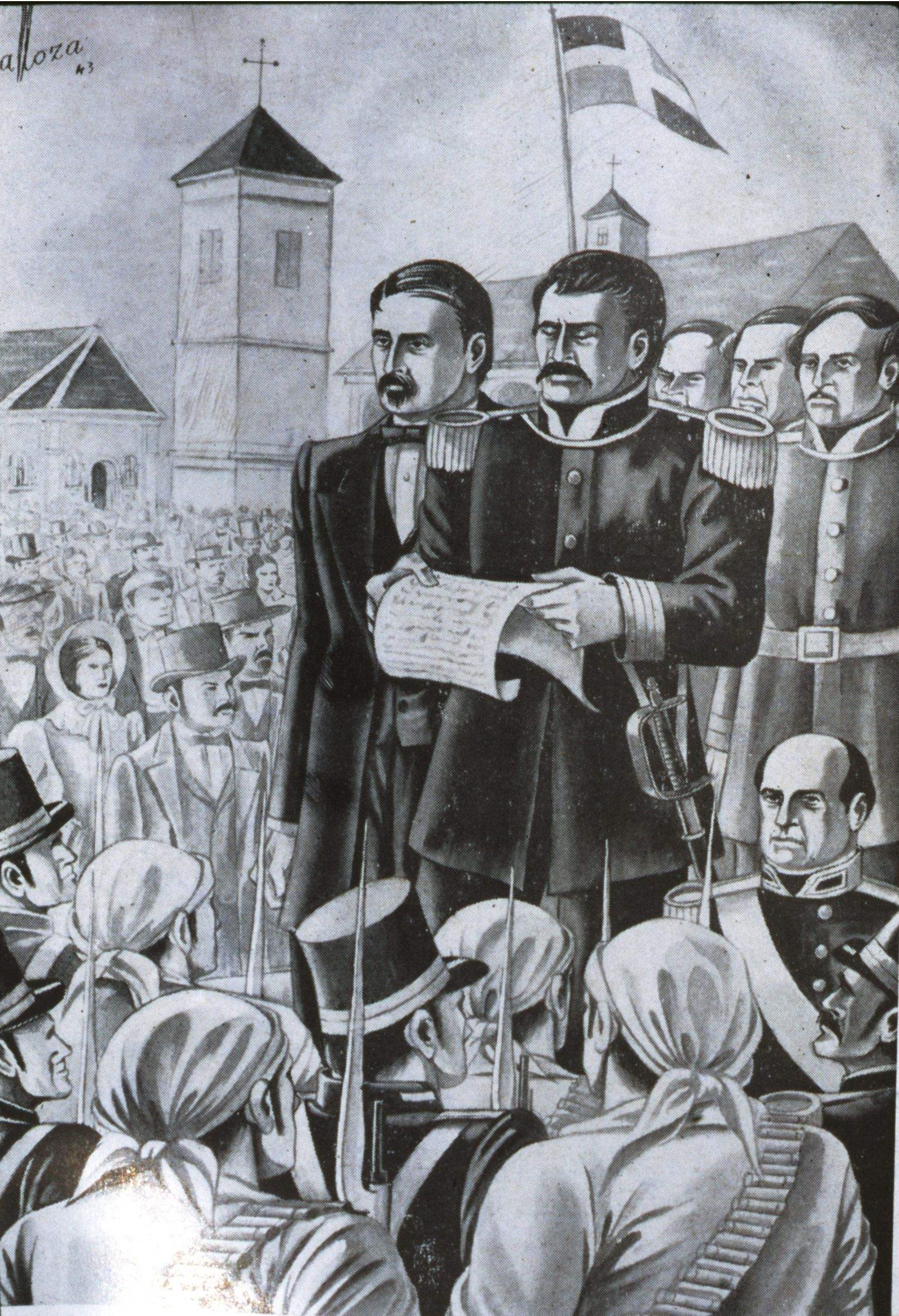
Illustration of General Mella proclaiming Duarte as president of the Dominican Republic.

Sánchez was appointed President and other members of the Cabinet were Pedro Alejandro Pina, Manuel María Valverde, Juan Isidro Pérez and Duarte himself. The Trinitarians were now focused on discarding Santana's influence and fighting against the conservatives. Santana had great influence in the government and Pedro Santana, aware of the military coup, wrote to the Central Government Board, requesting to retire from the army under the medical pretext that he was suffering from an illness.

Meanwhile, Buenaventura Báez and other conspirators communicated frequently with Santana and got him approved for sick leave. General Sánchez was appointed assistant chief of Santana, but was ultimately unable to fulfill that mission. Santana began organized troops made up of his friends and went to the city of Santo Domingo with the purpose of "restoring order". On July 4, 1844, in the city of Santiago, the Commander of the Department of Cibao, Mella, was oblivious to what was happening in Azua with Santana and proclaimed Juan Pablo Duarte, President of the Republic.

Duarte continued to Puerto Plata on July 8, where he was again proclaimed president by the people and the army. The strong support for the liberals was a product of commercial agriculture hand its development in the Cibao region rather than in the rest of the country. Urban sectors were more in favor of a democratic society.

=== Arrest and second exile ===
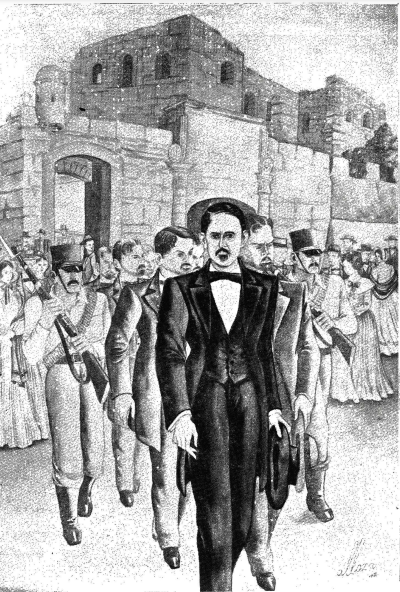
Illustration of Duarte's arrest by José Alloza.

Meanwhile, Santana approached the capital city with an army of more than 2,000 soldiers. The French consul threatened the Junta with intervention if they confronted Santana with military might. Some soldiers were pressured and Colonel José Joaquín Puello, Chief of the Plaza, denied support for the Trinitarios. Upon entering the capital with his troops, Santana rallied his supporters. Colonel Antonio Abad Alfau gave a passionate speech to the soldiers to which they responded with, "Down with the Junta! Long live General Santana!" On July 15, 1844, Santana met with the Governing Board to present their purposes. When Sánchez refused to cooperate, Santana ordered Sánchez's arrest as revenge. In a document drafted by Bobadilla and Caminero a month later, the Junta chaired by Santana declared, among other things:

To punish all the authors of the sedition, headed by General Juna Pablo Duarte (...) Declares that Brigadier Generals Duarte, R. Mella, Fco. del Rosario Sánchez, Commanders Pedro Alejandro Pina, Gregorio del Valle, Captain JJ Illas and Mr. Juan Isidro Pérez... They have been traitors and unfaithful to the Homeland and as such unworthy of the jobs and charges they held, of those who were deposed and dismissed from this day on.

The first deportees by Santana were: Mella, Pina and Juan José Illás, a Venezuelan poet and friend of Duarte. Duarte was arrested in the city of Puerto Plata along with Juan Evangelista Jiménez and other companions. On September 2, 1844 on a ship captained by Juan Bautista Cambiaso. Upon arriving in the capital, the Patrician was locked up in La Torre del Homenaje, (present-day Ozama Fortress). The imprisoned revolutionaries were then sent to exile in Hamburg. Duarte spent nineteen days in the city and met with members of his old brotherhood, the Freemansons, as was common among people of certain educational level in the country. Duarte's short stay in Germany can be attributed to his interest in being as close to his homeland as possible. On November 30, 1844, Duarte moved to the Caribbean island of Saint Thomas, where he rejected offers to enter the service of Haiti or Spain to oppose Santana. From there, he moved to La Guaira, Venezuela, where his entire family, now plunged into misery, had also been exiled by Santana.

== Life in Venezuela ==
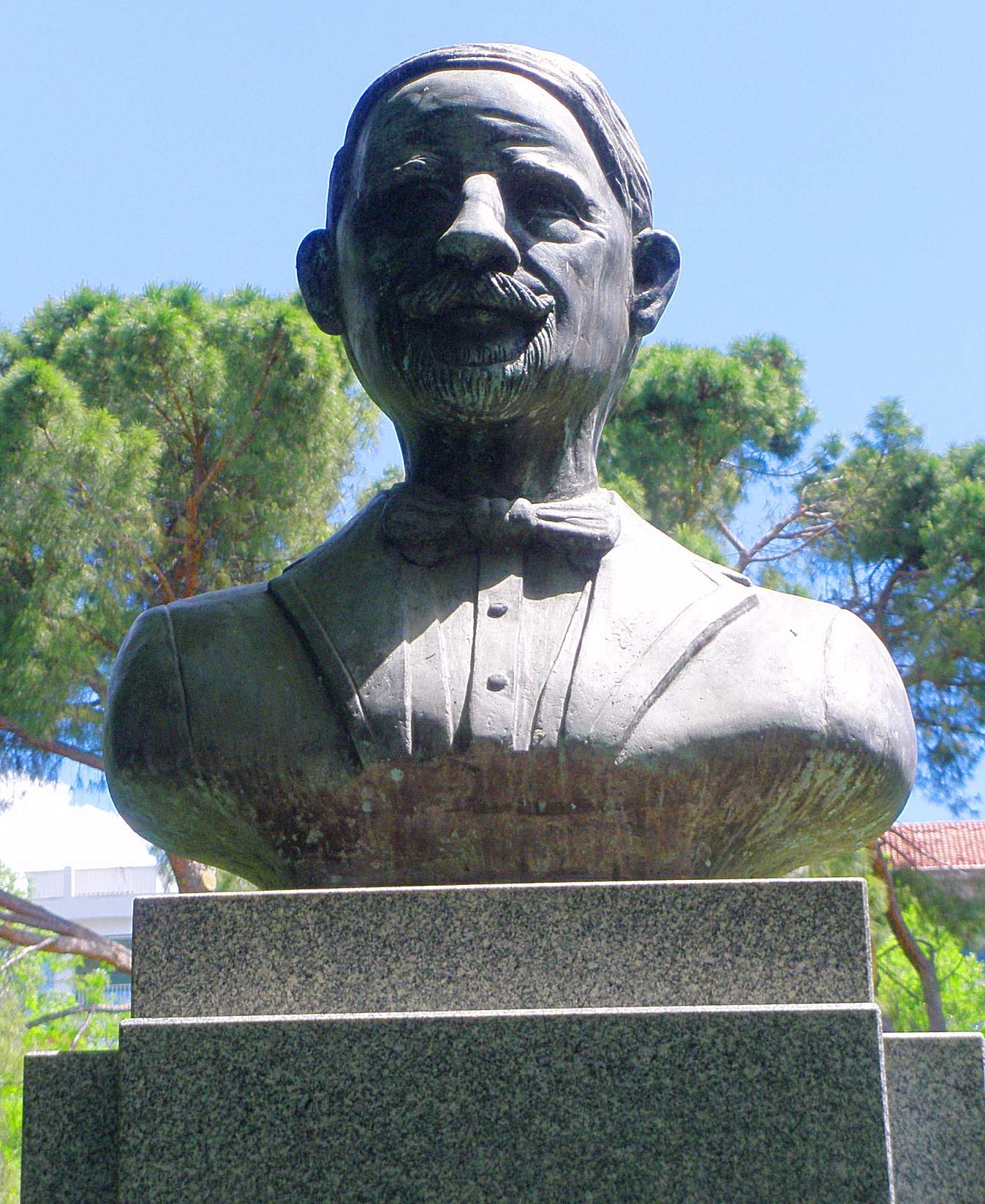
Over the next 15 years, it is known Duarte lived in recluse, avoiding the public life and refraining from engaging in politics. His activities are still the topic of discussion between historians

In the first years of Duarte's arrival in Venezuela, the country was torn between various political interests. Military veterans of the Venezuelan War of Independence exerted strong pressure to take power believing that their participation in the war had earned them political offices. José Antonio Páez (first President of the Republic), Carlos Soublette and the brothers José Tadeo Monagas and José Gregorio Monagas were among the proponents. The newly formed Liberal Party were civilian merchants and intellectuals who promoted ideas to develop the country according to liberal ideas, especially in economics; Antonio Leocadio Guzmán and Tomás Lander, founders of the party and controversial propagandists of liberal ideas, were popular figures in the movement. The landowners that were responsible for agricultural and livestock production were a third party seeking power. They became known as Conservatives and used their economic power to back their claims.

Conservative or Liberal affiliations were mixed at times with the conservatives adopting overly liberal measures that actual Liberals would publicly confront the about. The "Wait and Quit," law of April 10, 1834 was pushed by Conservatives. It left commercial transactions in the hands of the parties without effective intervention from the State which went on to ruin a considerable number of landowners and merchants on either side. This strong political confrontation was expressed in popular demonstrations and protests in the streets of the main cities and in the fields. In the cities, arrests, persecution and confiscation of property and, in the countryside, uprisings, riots and guerrillas, causing contention and anxiety throughout the populace. It has been said that throughout the 19th century, Venezuela experienced a single civil war with a few fleeting moments of calm. Faced with such political instability and pressure by the Dominican government, Duarte decided not to commit himself to Venezuelan politics and directed his course towards the town of San Carlos de Río Negro (today a Municipality of the Amazonas state) with a clear intention of going unnoticed.

=== Retreat to the jungle ===
In February 1845, while in Caracas, he received the news of the execution of María Trinidad Sánchez. Assuming guilt for this death, and rejecting the idea of encouraging a civil war, Duarte disappears from public life, entering the Venezuelan jungle. After writing his book, La Cartera Del Proscripto, he settled in the city of Angostura, where he lost all contact with friends and family for more than fifteen years. Durte apparently suffered from a state of chronic depression and at one point, family members left him for dead. Little is known about his life in the interior of Venezuela. Although he established relationships with figures of radical liberals, current of that country, he spent most of his time in a very remote El Apure, completely disconnected from what was happening in the world. It is known that he led a poor life, unconcerned with material aspects, but interacted with the priest Juan Bautista Sangenis, who taught him sacred history and encouraged him to take priestly habits, which he refused since he believed that he had not yet completed his mission in his homeland.

A deep friendship between Duarte and the priest Sangenis was born from their conversations. Duarte's mysticism was strengthened by the priest, who was well versed in religion and politics. Little by little, Sangenis convinced him to abandon his isolation and move to a less inhospitable place. Around 1852, when Duarte moved to the then Apure where he met with Venezuelan intellectuals, politicians and soldiers dissatisfied with the government.

=== Achaguas ===
Later, Duarte settled in Achaguas, a city with buildings made of mud and bahareque cane, on the banks of the Apure River, where he remained for some years. There, he began a new life among friends who spoke Portuguese. In Achaguas, Marcelino Muñoz befrineded Duarte and joined him in defending the landowner's demands to transform Venezuela until 1856, when Muñoz suddenly passed. At his funeral, Duarte delivered an elegy reproduced in the pamphlet "Posthumous Honors of Mr. Marcelino Muñoz," included as an appendix in the booklet "Contributions to a Bibliography on the State of Apure," written by Argenis Méndez Echenique.

=== San Fernando de Apure ===
After the death of Muñez, perhaps fleeing the devastation caused by the Federal War, Duarte moved to the capital city of San Fernando de Apure. He visited other towns on the Apureña plains, probably accompanying Sangenis in his ministry, who upon confirming his faith and attachment to religious and philosophical disciplines, invited him to embrace an ecclesiastical career. Duarte replied to Sangenis in a letter to his family: "He wanted me to dedicate myself to the Church, but the affairs of my country, which I hoped to conclude, prevented me from taking that status." Duarte's family rejoiced when receiving the letter as they were relieved to have heard from their lost relative after so many years.

=== Family and studies ===
Rosa Duarte's diary does not record anything between 1846 and 1862. She was surely not interested in returning to the country under the conditions of conservative hegemony, when politics did not correspond to her ideals. Juan Pablo was the only one of the Trinitarios expelled in 1844 who did not return after the amnesty of 1848, and his memory was erased from public consciousness or was surrounded by an image stigmatized by the accusations made against him by Santana and Bobadilla.

Duarte's family in Venezuela lived and worked in an affluent area. Duarte's cousin Manuel Diez became vice president of the country and helped shelter his kinsman. Duarte's family was known to produce candles, a major retail and wholesale product o the time. While not luxuriously rich, an income was available for the Duarte's. Duarte, even though he and his family were already residents of the country, felt ambivalent about openly participating in the country's political life despite the fact that his cousin Manuel Antonio Díez from the vice presidency, went on to become President of Venezuela in an Ad Tempore capacity.

Duarte's travels in Venezuela involved studying the indigenous people and learning from the black and mulatto communities as well as observing as much as he could of the Venezuela of his time. Duarte previous experience as a soldier, teacher, linguist and educator helped him survive but also marked him as an outsider. His Caribbean upbringing meant that he likely sounded much different than the Spanish speakers around him. Throughout his travels he was constantly moved by his current surroundings and the events around him. The longing he had for his homeland coupled with the hardships he faced would have left very little time for a long term wife, children or true stability.

== Restoration of Dominican independence ==
=== Prelude to annexation ===
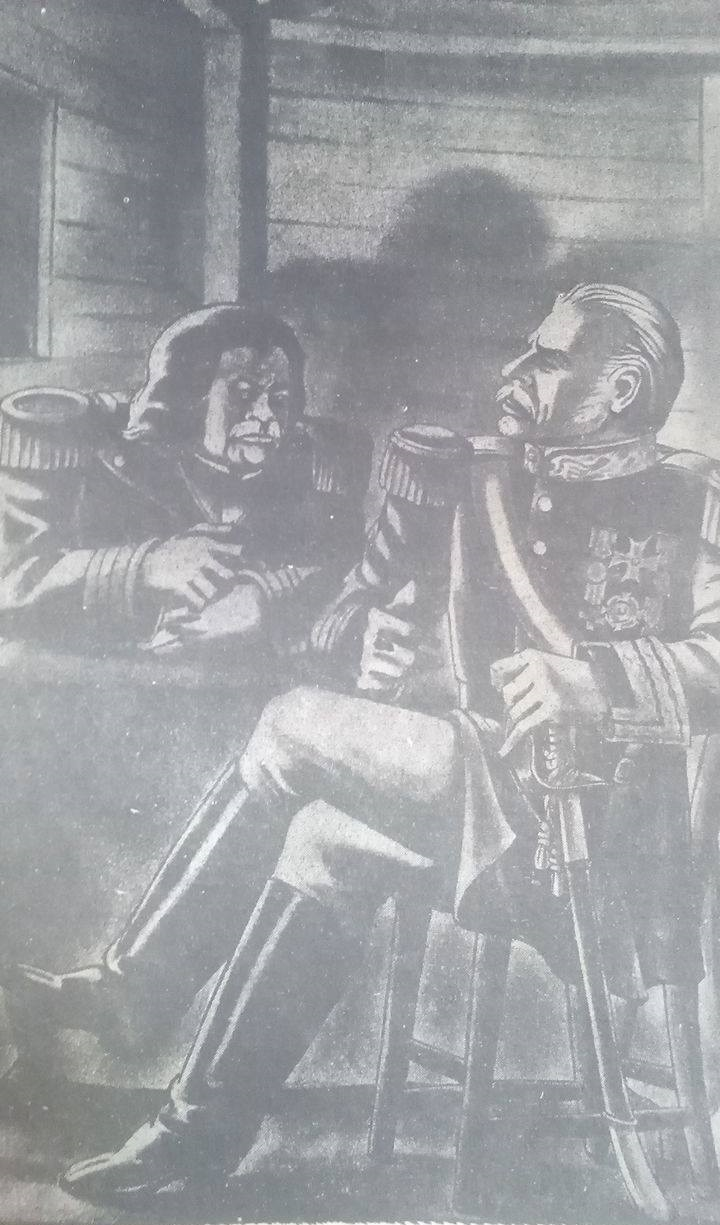
Illustration of Pedro Santana with brigadier general Antonio Peláez de Campomanes.

Within the 17 years of the First Republic, the nation was ravaged with political and economic instability. On numerous occasions the Haitians attempted to regain control over the Dominican part of the island but were repeatedly defeated. Political power passed to the conservatives and former Frenchified boyerista officials thanks to the control of the Central Government Board led by Bobadilla and of the Liberation Army by dictator General Santana. As time progressed, the constant power struggle between Santana and Buenaventura Báez, who was revealed as more cunning and no less annexationist than the former, set the stage for a period of political and economic chaos.

Between 1853 and 1857, Santana and Báez engaged in a series of political confrontations that eventually led to the outbreak of the Cibaeño Revolution during Báez's second term in office. Both would continue to propose that the Dominican Republic be annexed to a foreign power, with Santana choosing Spain and Báez subjecting to the United States. With Báez's overthrow in 1858, Santana once again became president, but now the nation was on the brink of collapse due to the bankrupt treasury left behind from Báez administration due to military costs. All of this, and the fears of a renewed Haitian invasion, led to Santana to seek out proposals from Queen Isabella II of Spain.

Sánchez and Mella, however, did not abandon their liberal positions or patriotic essentials. Their relationships with prominent conservatives was the price to remain in the interior of the country and influence things in the best possible direction. Duarte saw things differently. He believed it was impossible to accept any type of agreement with what he described as "faction". According to a letter from Juan Isidro Pérez, Duarte was disappointed in Sánchez, whom he had placed in charge following his 1843 exile, for reaching an agreement with Santana. For Duarte, the people's patriotism was the only possible pursuit, and he refused to conceive the existence of the parties, only recognizing the opposition of traitors. Referring to Báez and his early inclination in favor of the United States, Duarte wrote in 1865:

In Santo Domingo, there is only one town that wants to be and has proclaimed itself independent of all foreign power, and a miserable fraction that always has spoken out against this law, against this need of the Dominican people, always achieving by gave of his intrigues and sordid dealings to take over the situation.

Duarte preferred complete isolation to any concession. Politics had to be guided by noble purposes or it would be distorted. Consequently, politics implied high ideals, reflection and action for the benefit of the community. Above all things, politics was equivalent to patriotism. Duarte's notion of a free country, which was conceived in the willingness to sacrifice in favor of the principles and the well-being of the people, was the opposite of what was commonly considered as politics: the struggle for power.

=== Assistance from Venezuela ===
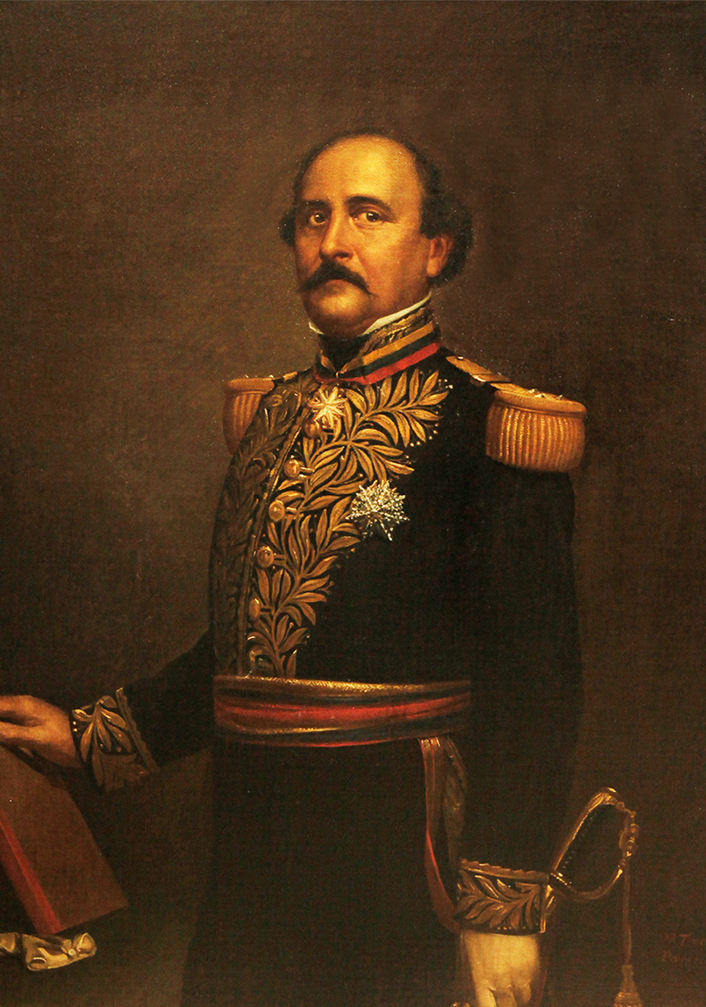
Juan Crisostomo Falcon, Minister of External Relations of Venezuela.

Although many aspects of his life in Venezuela remain unknown, it is certain that Duarte did not abandon his inclination to action. When sensing danger approaching his country, he did not hesitate to present himself. He learned of the annexation of the Dominican Republic to Spain on March 1861, a year after it happened, and moved to Caracas in August 1862. During the following months, he remained mainly in expectation. Some argue that Duarte felt regret for the country, since apparently the majority of the population accepted Santana's betrayal. In a brief letter, he wrote:

The sufferings of my brothers were extremely sensitive to me, but it was more painful to see that the fruit of so many sacrifices, so much suffering, was the loss of the independence of that country so dear to my heart, and instead of accepting the opulence that degraded us, I accepted with joy the bitter disappointment that I knew awaited me the day when my short services would no longer be believed useful or necessary to individuals.

It was when the Dominican Restoration War broke out in August 1863 that Duarte started moving. His sister's diary stated that on December 20, 1863, he moved to Caracas with his uncle Mariano Diez. As soon as he found out that the people had begun the fight against Spanish domination, Duarte formed a revolutionary center in Caracas. His brother Vicente Celestino, his uncle Mariano Diez, the young poet Manuel Rodríguez Objío and Candelario Oquendo joined him. Several Venezuelans were interested in supporting the Dominican cause, those who stood against Blas and Manuel Bruzual 'The Fearless Soldier'. President Juan Crisóstomo Falcón of Venezuela received Duarte and promised him help, despite the difficult several years of federal war. Duarte's help was only minimal, since the matter was left in the hands of the vice president, Antonio Guzmán Blanco, (future autocrat of Venezuela), who was not interested in helping the Dominicans. Duarte reflected that Venezuelans were no different from Dominicans. Apparently, he only received a thousand pesos from the Venezuelan government. Many Dominicans came to support Duarte's orders, but lacked funds to take meaningful action. Together with the four aforementioned companions, he was able to embark in Curaçao in route to his homeland in March 1864. Enduring a long voyage on the Gold Munster schooner, they returned to Guaira and passed through the Turks and Caicos Islands, where they had to evade the intense pursuit of a Spanish warship. From there, he arrived in Haiti, in the town of Cap-Haïtien, and made his way to the Dominican Republic. After 20 years of exile, he has returned to his homeland.

=== Second return to Dominican Republic ===
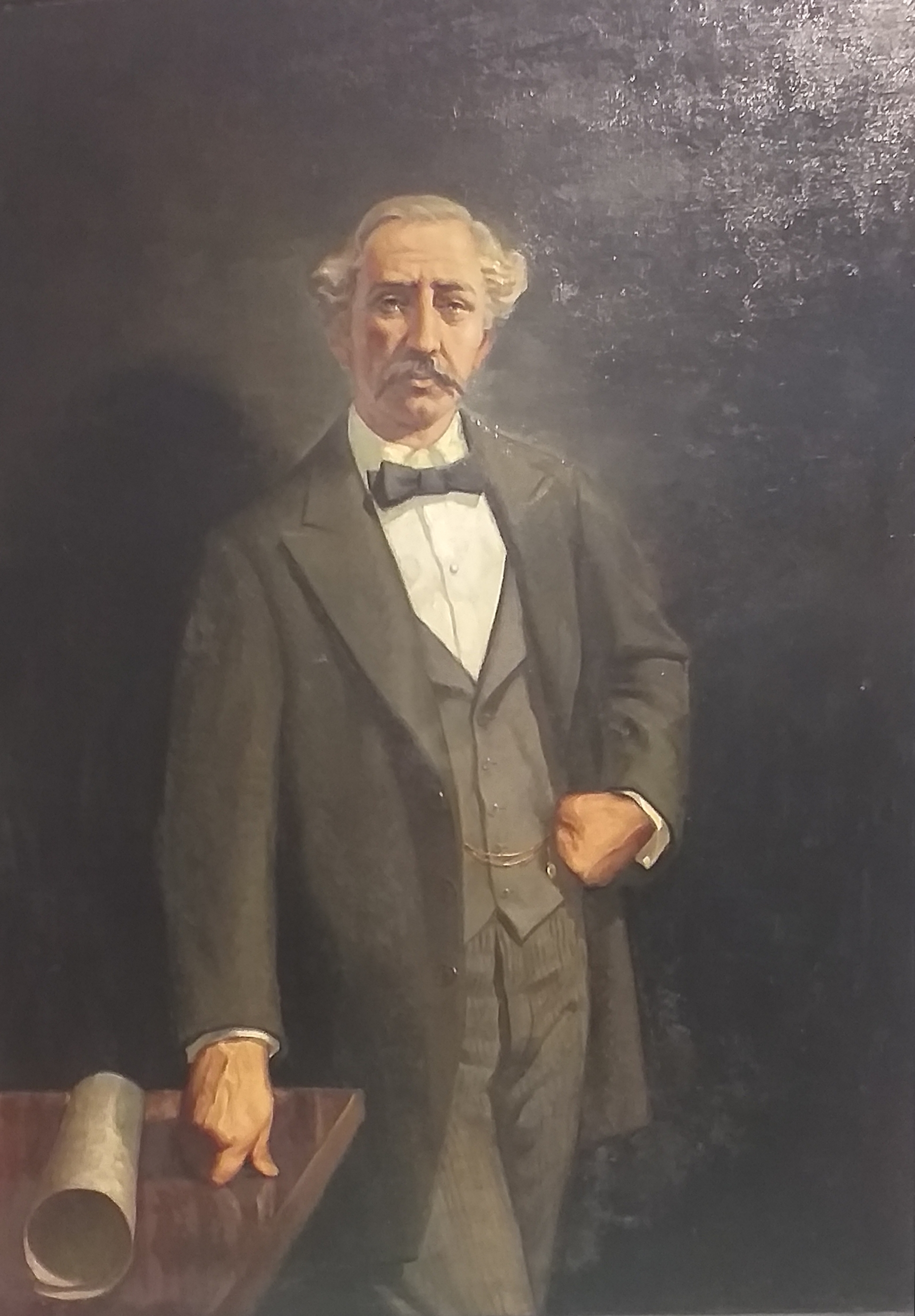
Portrait of General Juan Pablo Duarte

Duarte arrived in Monte Cristi on March 25, 1864, and immediately address the Restoration government. He was joyfully received by General Benito Monción, and the next day, they left for Guayubín. There he saw his old friend, Matías Ramón Mella, who had been appointed Vice President of the Provisional Government a few days before. Mella was bedridden and in a serious state, which distraught Duarte's. Duarte had special trust in Mella, as well as a close friendship. It was Mella that Duarte sent to Haiti to solidify the political alliance with the reformist Haitians who were fighting against Boyer, and it was Mella, once national independence was achieved, who proclaimed Duarte president of the Republic in Cibao. General José María Cabral, hero of the Battle of Santomé, was present at the emotional meeting.

On March 28, Duarte wrote a letter to the Santiago restoration government expressing his willingness to consecrate what remains of his strength and life to the service of the Dominican Restoration. A few days later, the acting president, Ulises Francisco Espaillat, responded by saying that the Government "sees with indescribable joy" his return to the heart of the Homeland. In Guayubín, he contracted malaria and had to stay bedridden until April 2, 1864. That day, still ill, he left for Santiago carrying the seriously ill General Mella with them. They arrived in Santiago two days later and Duarte appeared before the restoration authorities the following day where he reiterated the concepts of his letter of the April 28, 1864. His health was deteriorating and had to remain immobilized in bed. President General José Antonio Salcedo was campaigning in the South thus missing Duarte's arrival. On April 14 he received a letter from the Minister of Finance, Alfredo Deetjen, in which was communicated: "My government having accepted the services that you have spontaneously offered us has decided to use them, entrusting the Republic of Venezuela with a mission whose purpose You will be informed in due course. In this virtue, my government hopes that you will be willing to get ready to embark on a trip while the credentials and instructions for the case are prepared."

=== Final exile ===
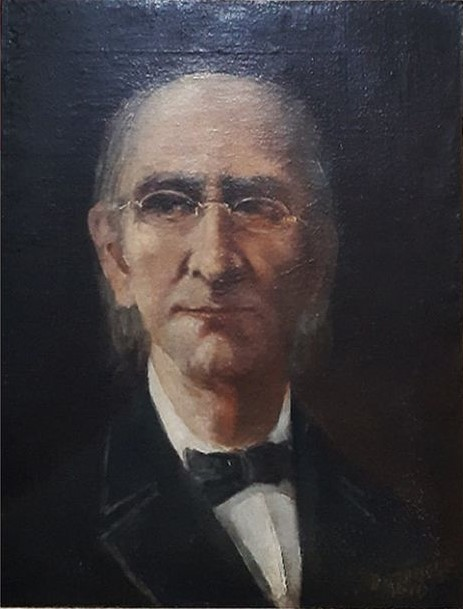
Despite Duarte's glorious return to the island, many of his contemporaries had not yet recognized his presence. This was shown perhaps when Ulises Francisco Espaillat sent him on a diplomatic mission to Venezuela, only a few months after Duarte's arrival.

The restoration government did not evaluate the importance that it had the presence of Duarte. This could have been due to his long absence and that some of the leaders of the national contest had been supporters of Santana. Alfredo Deetjen's letter dismayed Duarte. Sad and disappointed, he began to think that he was not welcome in certain circles of the government. This mission, neither desired nor requested by him, contradicted the effort he had made to return to his homeland and his desire to remain in the country fighting for the Restoration.

In April 1864, the government of Santiago through Espaillat asked Duarte to move to Venezuela at the head of a diplomatic mission seeking help. He was not willing to accept the assignment due to his desire to participate in the struggle for the interior of the country, but, a few days later, an article published in the Diario de la Marina in Havana, was received, signed by G. (who could have been the writer Manuel de Jesús Galván, the main Dominican spokesperson of the Spanish regime in Santo Domingo), which predicted internal struggles among the restaurateurs for control due to the return of Duarte. Duarte then informed Espaillat that he would accept the appointment, although hoping to remain in the interior of the country for a while longer. Espaillat, however, quickly confirmed Duarte's appointment. At the beginning of June, invested as Minister Plenipotentiary, Duarte left for Haiti and on April 28, he arrived in Saint Thomas. He continued to Curaçao, where he remained for almost two months making enormous diplomatic efforts. In August, he returned to Caracas. He never again saw the Dominican Republic, the land that he always loved and for which he resignedly accepted the greatest sacrifices. After nearly two years of war, Spain annulled the annexation and called off its remaining troops. As a result, independence was restored, and by July 1865, Spanish forces were off the island.

== Final years ==
=== Post-Restoration War ===
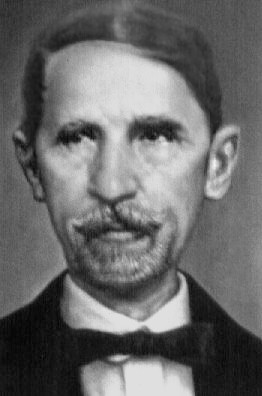
Only known photo of Juan Pablo Duarte. Taken by the Venezuelan photographer Prospero Agustín Rey Medrero in Venezuela, in 1873.

Duarte closely followed the evolution of the Dominican Republic, as shown in the active correspondence he had during those months although he resigned from diplomatic representation following the overthrow of President Gaspar Polanco, who had released his credentials. He was above all concerned about how the country would be restructured after being annexed, this time in favor of the United States, which was promoted by Buenaventura Báez. He pointed out in a letter to Félix María Delmonte:

If I spoke out independent Dominican, since July 16, 1838..., if later, in the year '44, I spoke out against the French protectorate...; and if after twenty years of absence I have spontaneously returned to my country to protest with arms in hand against the annexation to Spain carried out despite the national vote for the deception of that traitor and parricide side, it is not to be expected that I stop protesting (and with me every good Dominican) which I protest and will always protest, I'm not just saying against the annexation of my Country to the United States, but to any other power on earth, and at the same time against any treaty that tends to undermine in the least our National Independence.. [...]

From the end of 1865, Dominican politics moved away from the patriotic objectives stated during the Restoration. Most leaders who emerged from that war oriented toward anarchic and conservative positions. Duarte must have assessed the poverty of the political leadership, as he referenced it in another letter to Delmonte on May 2, 1865:

You say (and it is true) that Benigno Rojas is nothing but Yankee, and Báez who is nothing but Haitian-Gallo-Spanish, and Lavastida and Alfaus and Manueles are Yankees; Báez says that says that Bobadilla is nothing but Pandora, Melitón is everything, except Dominican, says José Portes who is in Saint-Thomas, and adds to this that being a senator, so that he would keep his mouth shut when the Annexation, Santana gave him a house. Poor country! If these are the consultants, what will be consulted?

Duarte was said to have experienced new disappointment when he saw that the old annexationist and architect of the Levasseur Plan of 1843, Buenaventura Báez, was elevated to the presidency by the then president, José María Cabral, champion of the Restoration in the south. Duarte then disassociated himself from Dominican politics. The country entered a whirlwind of passions between leaders and a difficult situation in which annexation to the United States was approved in 1870. Practically, everyone forgot about Duarte; Occasionally he received visits or correspondence from liberal intellectuals interested in the reconstruction of the events that led to the birth of the Republic. Gregorio Luperón, the hero of the Restoration War, made efforts to return Duarte back to the country. In addition, Duarte received a letter from President Ignacio María González, who invited him to reintegrate into the Dominican Republic, but by now, Duarte was in extreme poverty and his health was fading rapidly and could not respond to these calls for his return.

=== Death ===
On July 14, 1876, Duarte's health was seriously deteriorating. Suffering from tuberculosis and pneumonia, his breathing had worsened, causing him to be bedridden. In his final moments he was residing in his home, located on the corners of Zamuro and Pájaro, and was accompanied by sisters Rosa and Francisco, and his brother, Manuel. The next day, at 3 in the morning, he died. A text narrates his passing:

Caracas, on the night of July 14, 1876, Duarte was approaching his end and while his sisters, Rosa and Francisca, watched by his side; His brother Manuel, lost her mind, was shooting nonsense in a neighboring room. The most complete misery prevailed in the house, whose furniture was very scarce. Rosa and Francisca lived by sewing and their earnings were so meager that they could barely survive. Such was the environment in which Duarte was close to death, after suffering for a year from an exhausting illness (pneumonia) that turned him into a ghost. He was 63 years old and looked over eighty. A life of illness, deprivation and sacrifice had reduced him to that pitiful situation. For his neighbors in Caracas, Duarte was a Dominican who had had some importance in his country or at least that was what it seemed.

What these people did not know was that if the Duartes were in such a terrible situation, it was due to the love they felt for their country because on two occasions, in 1844 and 1863, they sacrificed an important part of the family heritage for it. Nor did they know that that old man, who looked abstracted and sick, had been one of the purest patricians in America, who had dedicated himself to serving his country with "soul, life and heart." And they did not know that this poor Dominican, who lived so darkly, had been considered the Nazarene Jesus of the Dominicans. As for their sisters, those same people were unaware that those poor women, who now did not even have good eyesight to sew, together with their mother, now deceased, had manufactured more than 5,000 bullets for the independence of their country.

But let's go back to the patient. At two in the morning on Saturday, silence enveloped Caracas. The night advanced and the city looked deserted. In the sad Duarte house, Rosa and Francisca kept vigil. Everything announced the proximity of the end, and in the dying man's room, poorly lit by a candle, prayers alternated with silence. The time advances and the patient's breathing becomes more difficult. The wait is long. Finally, at three in the morning, on July 15, 1876, the dying man breathed his last sigh. The room is filled with sobs. Rosa and France bloom inconsolably. Duarte is dead. He has died far from the land where he was born, in a corner of Caracas, forgotten by his compatriots and plunged into the blackest misery.

The first news of his death was announced through the Diario de Avisos, of Caracas, in the afternoon edition of July 15, 1876. The note states the following:

General (sic) Juan Pablo Duarte, leader of Dominican independence, has died; His relatives and friends who subscribe hope that you will accompany them to the burial of the body tomorrow at 9 am in the IP of Santa Rosalía." - Caracas, July 15, 1876.

Very few attended Duarte's funeral with the exceptions of family members, friends, and some immediate neighbors. Among the attendees were: Manuel Duarte, Enrique Duarte, José Ayala, Francisco Tejera, Federico Tejera, AS de Vizcarrondo, Marcos Guzmán, Felipe Tejera, Miguel Tejera and Andrés Tejera.

== Personal life ==
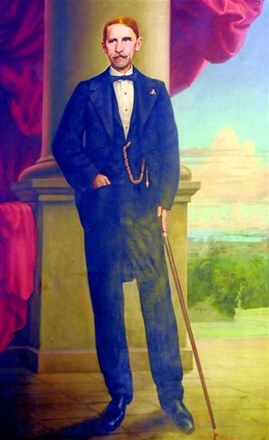
Reserved 19th century photo of Duarte

Duarte's personal life to date is a subject of discussion. It is known that he was a poet who followed Romanticism and played the guitar, piano and flute; he also practiced fencing. Duarte was also a polyglot who spoke six languages: Spanish, Latin, Portuguese, French, English and German.

During his youth, Duarte had several love affairs. His first relationship was with María Antonia Bobadilla, which she ended years later for unknown reasons. The Duarte Museum is said to have preserved the ring in which he gave to her as a sign of commitment. Years later, Duarte fell in love with Prudencia "Nona" Lluberes, a Catalan descendant with whom he formalized a relationship that was interrupted due to his exile and his subsequent suffering from tuberculosis. The dates on which Duarte maintained these relationships are not known, given the imprecision about his private life and the last years of his life in exile. Some historians also certify that he had a son during his stay in Venezuela with a woman named Marcela Mercedes.

Jose Joaquin Perez Saviñon, director of the Duartiano Institute, commented on Duarte's first love story: "For unknown reasons, the engagement was broken." Duarte would have the opportunity to fall in love again, this time with a descendant of Catalans and a relative of various patriots, Prudencia Lluberes, La Nona. Troncoso Sánchez says in Apuntes Duartianos that "his second girlfriend received, like his first, his promise of marriage symbolized in a ring."

Always persecuted by his ideals, Duarte loved, but could not continue with Prudencia "Nona" Lluberes. Pérez Saviñón comments that Yovanny Ferrúa wrote an article highlighting that already in exile, Duarte wanted to marry her by her power, but they did not let him because he already suffered from tuberculosis. "They even tore up the letters he sent her for fear of contagion from her, which is why Duarte's love letters are not preserved," says the president of the Duartiano Institute.

Pérez Saviñón assures that Prudencia always hoped and dreamed of the Father of the country. She never married. Saviñón explained:

When they brought Duarte's remains, Nona lived in front of the Colón park and they took her out onto the balcony already blind, very old and it is said that she said: 'I have followed you up to here Juan Pablo,' and after a few months she died," she narrates.

While the country maintains the version that Duarte never married, much less that he had children, Bulletin 117 of the General Archive of the Nation, called "The Duarte family: Genealogy at the service of history," Antonio José Guerra Sánchez refers to the Theories of the descendants of Juan Pablo Duarte Díez.

Guerra Sánchez says:

At different times, some authors (including the journalist and historian Luis Padilla D'Onis, originally from Arecibo, Puerto Rico) have tried to indicate descent from founding father Juan Pablo Duarte, through his cousin Vicenta Díez, in her daughters Carmen Sandalia and Sinforosa Duarte Díez.

However, he adds that it is unknown if there was a Vicenta Díez and even less is known of which of the brothers of the mother of the hero was her daughter. What is certain is that Duarte did not marry, and according to Pérez Saviñón he did not "because he clearly said that he had married the country, all his efforts were for the country. The love for the homeland was superior to everything, even though he was already a defeated old man, he still thought about the homeland. He sacrificed himself for his spirit of service."

== Writings ==
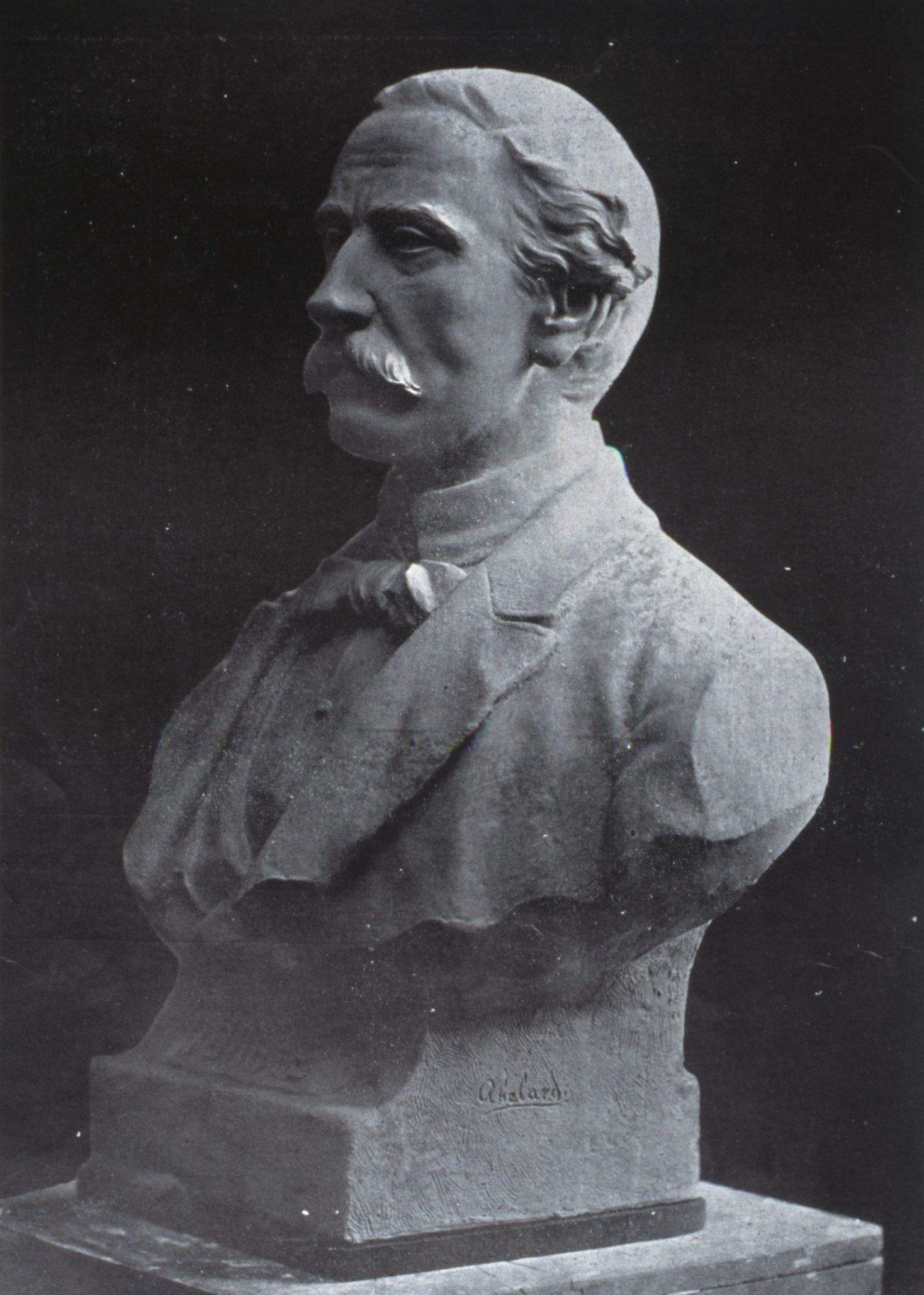
Bust of Juan Pablo Duarte

Aside from his stature as a revolutionary leader, he was also known as a writer. Duarte did not pretend to be a poet, as Don Vetilio says, although he liked poetry as demonstrated by his published verses, including some saved poems, which he wrote when he was almost lost in the Venezuelan jungle. His poetry, as Ángela Peña points out, is "an extension of his patriotic and political work, even though there are poems of his in which he sings to women. It cannot be considered that the Father of the Nation was a poet. Literary creation was not a habit in his life. He wrote responding to the imperatives of the moment without having poetry as a constant and permanent way of expression." Among the known poems, written by Juan Pablo Duarte in Santo Domingo, are Tristezas de la noche, Santana, Canto de guerra, Antifona, El Criollo, Desconsuelo, Suplica, Himno, La Cartera del proscribado, and four other poems without titles. In his romantic production, the poem Romance, the theme of bitterness is evident. Remoteness portrays the stormy pain of feeling expatriated from her land along with her eight companions in misfortune, those who gave everything to see her free and sovereign:

" /…/ They who will launch themselves in the name of God, / Homeland and freedom; / They who gave the People / The desired independence. / They were thrown from the ground / For whose happiness they fought: / Outlawed, yes, by traitors / Those who were in excess of loyalty. / They were watched descend / to the quiet shore, / They He heard them say goodbye,/And from their muffled voice/I picked up the

However, of the writings in his eventful years of exile, there are only a few verses without titles, contributed by the Venezuelan historian Francisco Manuel de las Heras y Borrero in his essay Juan Pablo Duarte in Venezuela, written while he lived in Chaguas: "Here the Patricio will participate in literary and social gatherings, avoiding overtly political ones, given his refugee status. (…). Duarte's presence in this geographical location is clearly identified in 1856, the year in which the first book published in Apure was published. These are the Posthumous Honors of Mr. Marcelino Muñoz (…). In the reviewed publication, a poem by Juan Pablo Duarte appears, dedicated to extolling the merits of the deceased, his friend, who was the president of the Masonic Sociedad Joven Achaguas, which Juan Pablo Duarte frequented." Here are the verses contributed by de las Heras and Borreros:

"Of paragon honor and model virtue,/ I call that impious world his own,/ and Heaven said without mercy, without mourning,/ with a tremendous voice "Marcelino is mine." / And he heard that ruling, and without moaning in pain / with a calm, religious and pious face. / Goodbye he said to us with a serene face, / he who was from Apure the spirit. / And when the poor foreigner / sees himself sick and helpless, / who like the softened / will give him whole bread and home?

== Legacy and honors ==
=== Symbol of Dominican independence ===
Statue of Duarte in Duarte Park, in Santo Domingo, Dominican Republic

Duarte was, in his time, the most consistent exponent of nationalist and independence ideas derived from the liberal principles of the American Revolution and French Revolution of 1776 and 1789, respectively. He was also the main promoter of national consciousness and permanent defender of the Dominican national identity. He advocated the union of all Dominicans as well as the establishment of a democratic republic based on the rule of the Constitution and the laws in order to fully guarantee the public rights and freedoms of citizens.

Duarte was never in favor of violating democratic procedures to access political power and direct national destinies. He believed in national unity as an indispensable principle to prevent civil discord and the desires of foreign powers from causing his independence project to succumb. He is remembered with respect as "Father of the Dominican Republic" with preservation of his admirable patriotic legacy. Thanks to his revolutionary work, Dominicans today constitute their own ethnic and cultural community. Duarte was always willing to defend national sovereignty against the claims of those who "without judgment and without heart they conspire against the health of the country".

Duarte managed to establish a free Republic which, through the voting process, could give rise to a democracy where all citizens could be equal and free. The study trips he made to Europe in his adolescence, a continent where liberal ideas resulting from the French Revolution were debated and imposed, greatly influenced his later attitudes in the independence struggles. His political thought and his magnificent feat in the independence struggles places him along with Simón Bolívar, José de San Martín, José Gervasio Artigas, Carlos Manuel de Céspedes, Antonio Maceo and José Martí. He is considered a national hero and father of democracy in the Dominican Republic. He is also credited with being the precursor of Dominican theater by being the first to promote theatrical events through the La Filantrópica and La Dramática societies, which aimed to present theatrical works alluding to Dominican freedom. Duarte encountered serious dangers and misfortunes due to the knowledge he acquired in Europe and his decision to create a Republic that would serve as a base for Dominicans to get rid of Haitian repression and the betrayals of conservatives who had accommodated their interests to Spain, France, Great Britain, and the United States, regardless of the persecution that Duarte and his followers fell victim to. Dominican historian Vetilio Alfau Durán writes:

During the twenty years of exile, misfortune had dug its claws into the body of Juan Pablo Duarte, annihilating him. Thus, aged, with the mark of the havoc marked on his face, he landed in the national territory, in the heart of Cibao, which was at war, to protest with weapons in his hands, against the annexation to Spain, he appeared before the Provisional Government. A restaurateur established in Santiago, he offers his services and makes this categorical statement: "No matter how desperate the cause of my country may be, it will always be the cause of honor, and I will always be willing to honor its banner with my blood.

One of his most emblematic phrases was, "Living without a country is the same as living without honor!" This quote left a great mark on the Dominican people. In addition, his dream of a nation free of all foreign power is evident through another famous phrase: "Our homeland must be free and independent from any foreign power or the island sinks."

=== Admiration by other historical figures ===
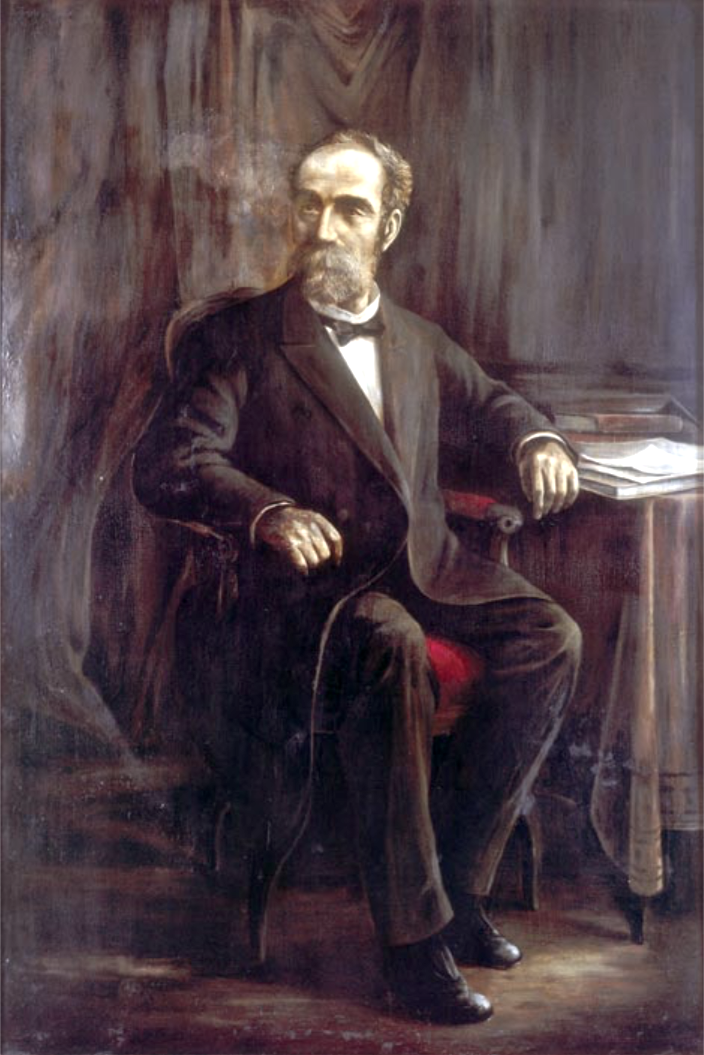
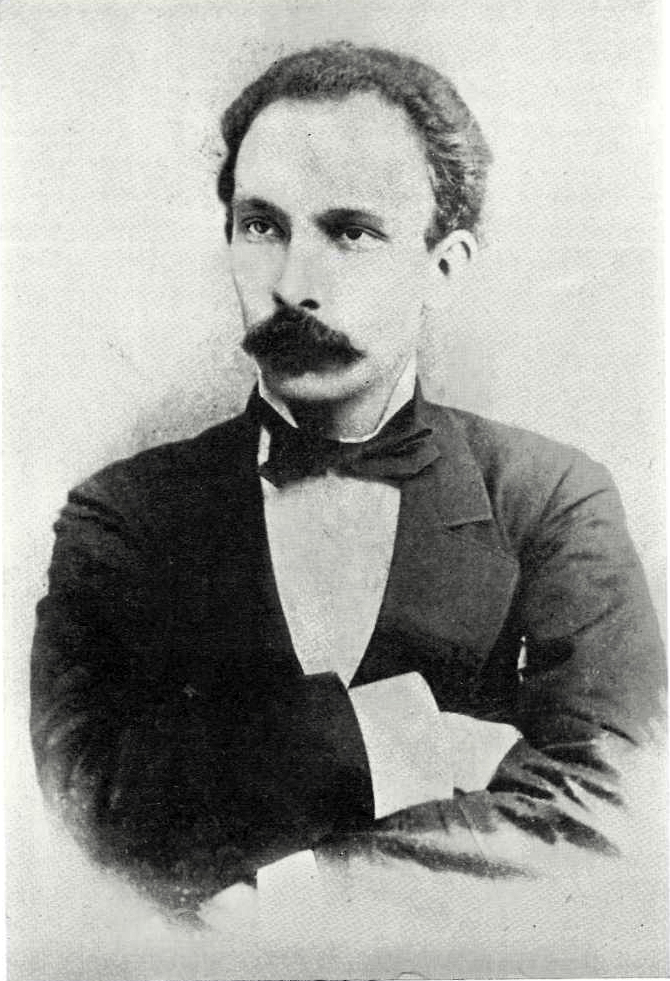
Duarte's legacy was recognized throughout Latin America. Independence activists such as Eugenio Maria de Hostos (left) and José Martí (right) took inspiration from Duarte.

Duarte's revolutionary work earned him praise from other leaders throughout North America. He also gained acknowledgement from other Caribbean independence leaders, especially Eugenio Maria de Hostos of Puerto Rico, and José Martí of Cuba. Both leaders spoke admirably of Dominican Republic's struggle for freedom, with the former even referring to Duarte as the master of patriotism. The distinguished Dominican intellectual Federico Henríquez y Carvajal, a close friend and collaborator of Hostos, in his capacity as President of the Erector Board, spoke at the inauguration of the monument to Juan Pablo Duarte on July 16, 1930, and cited the following words of the Puerto Rican humanist referring to the patrician:

When Cibao, to whom the restoration of independence was entrusted, did the wonders he did, Duarte presented himself to take his position. It seems that at that moment his agony began. It seems that, from that moment, he once again saw up close the ingratitude that had banished him twenty years ago. It seems that, from that moment, he saw the incompatibility that existed between him and the others, between the new and the old organizers of the defense of the homeland. It seems that, from that moment, he sentenced himself to death in exile. There is no doubt that Duarte was exiled again, that he once again went to wander hungry and lonely, lonely and hungry, through fields as undeveloped as these, and like almost all of them, for self-denial and patriotism. But there is also no doubt that the country owed him one last service: that of dying far from it, removing the weight of remorse from his shoulders!

Hostos left evidence in his intellectual work of the admiration and respect that the historical figure of the patrician inspired in him. In the book Visión de Hostos sobre Duarte, published in 2013 under the auspices of the General Archive of the Nation, several texts were brought together by the immortal author of Moral Social referring to the three fathers of the Dominican homeland, but with emphasis on Duarte. In The municipality of Santo Domingo - or The repatriation of Duarte's ashes, as this short article can be titled - Hostos discusses the interest of the First City in bringing the remains of Duarte to the Dominican Republic: "For a long time now, Luperón and other patriots had asked public opinion for the repatriation of Duarte's ashes. They preached in the desert."

It remains pending, for a later and more exhaustive investigation, to rescue a dramatic text that Hostos wrote in Chile alluding to Duarte's return to his homeland in March 1864, according to the information that the historian Emilio Rodríguez Demorizi records: "There [in Chile] he wrote the children's comedy Duarte's Arrival, not to Chile naturally, but to the distant homeland. His children play, warlike, Dominicans and Haitians, and he is excited like a child when the eldest of them, victorious, shows him with his index finger, on the highest branch of an olive tree, the Duarte flag."

Hostos refers to this children's play in a letter addressed to the editor of the newspaper El Telefono, from Santiago de Chile, on 23 September 1890, the year in which we assume he wrote the aforementioned comedy. He regrets not having been able, due to health problems that afflicted him, to perform The Arrival of Duarte, a children's comedy animated by affectionate memories and acclamations from little Dominicans that would not have failed to resonate among the spectators. In that letter there is a lot of love shown towards Duarte's homeland: "I have spent the [Chilean] national holidays unwell. Consequently, I have not been able to take the part in them that I wanted, and that would have made our Quisqueya and its flag take."

Martí, who knew the life and work of Duarte, wrote about him on several occasions. In this regard, Emilio Rodríguez Demorizi published an essential text to know Martí's relationship with the Dominican Republic: Martí in Santo Domingo. The book collects everything that Martí, nicknamed the "Cuban Apostle," wrote on Dominican topics, including those referring to Duarte. For the month of April 1894, funds were collected in Santo Domingo to erect the statue of the founder of the Republic, Juan Pablo Duarte. Generalissimo Máximo Gómez was in New York, where he was preparing to set off for Cuba to fight in the Cuban War of Independence, and decided to take a "parenthesis in revolutionary work to write to the director of Patria, by José Martí." (Patria was the Cuban revolutionary newspaper). In Gómez's letter, he requests the contribution of Cubans to "increase the funds (to) erect a statue of Juan Pablo Duarte worthy of his memory."

Martí's response as director of Patria, called, Adhesion of Patria and General Gómez's letter were published on April 17. In it, Martí shows great mastery of the Dominican historical process and, especially, of the figure of the founder of the Republic. There he speaks:

And Patria, general, that in the courage of men and in the loyalty of women sees erected forever in the Dominican conscience, above transits and appearances, the indomitable vigilance with which the founder Duarte raised his fallen people.

Homeland, which still contemplates him, sagacious creator, illuminate with the fiery word, accused of being deluded and demagogic, the youth who in the humility of "La Trinitaria" learned from him to ignore the vile advice of well-off pride, or fear corrupter, who prefers the barragonies of dishonor to the health of freedom, always restless in childhood.

Homeland, which sees him plot, with the power of his council - and with no other arms than the idea, mother of arms - the rebellion that, from a leap of heroes, threw back the Haitian, so great when he defended his freedom as guilty when he oppressed others.

Homeland, which still sees, with the joy of a sister soul, the flash of Mella's blunderbuss light in the air, and an invincible people fall, standing, from the folds that unravel, opening to death, Sánchez's flag, there in the famous Puerta del Conde, on that day of the entrails, February 27.

Homeland, which later saw him, a victim of his own children, thrown out of power, which was in his hands like the ark of the Republic, and dying in expatriation, sad and poor, as a final service to the country, before whose appetites and fainting, freedom must be erected, in order to better preserve itself, with the poetry of sacrifice.

Homeland, with its two hands extended, asks Cubans and Puerto Ricans for their tribute for the monument to Duarte: the tribute of Americans to a martyr of freedom who redeems and edifies; the tribute of gratitude of Cubans to the homeland of the heroes who carried their cross on their bloody shoulder, and with the helmets of their horses marked the path of honor in Cuba.

Patria, in its next issue, opens the list of Cuba's tribute to Duarte's monument."

— José Marti

=== Monuments ===
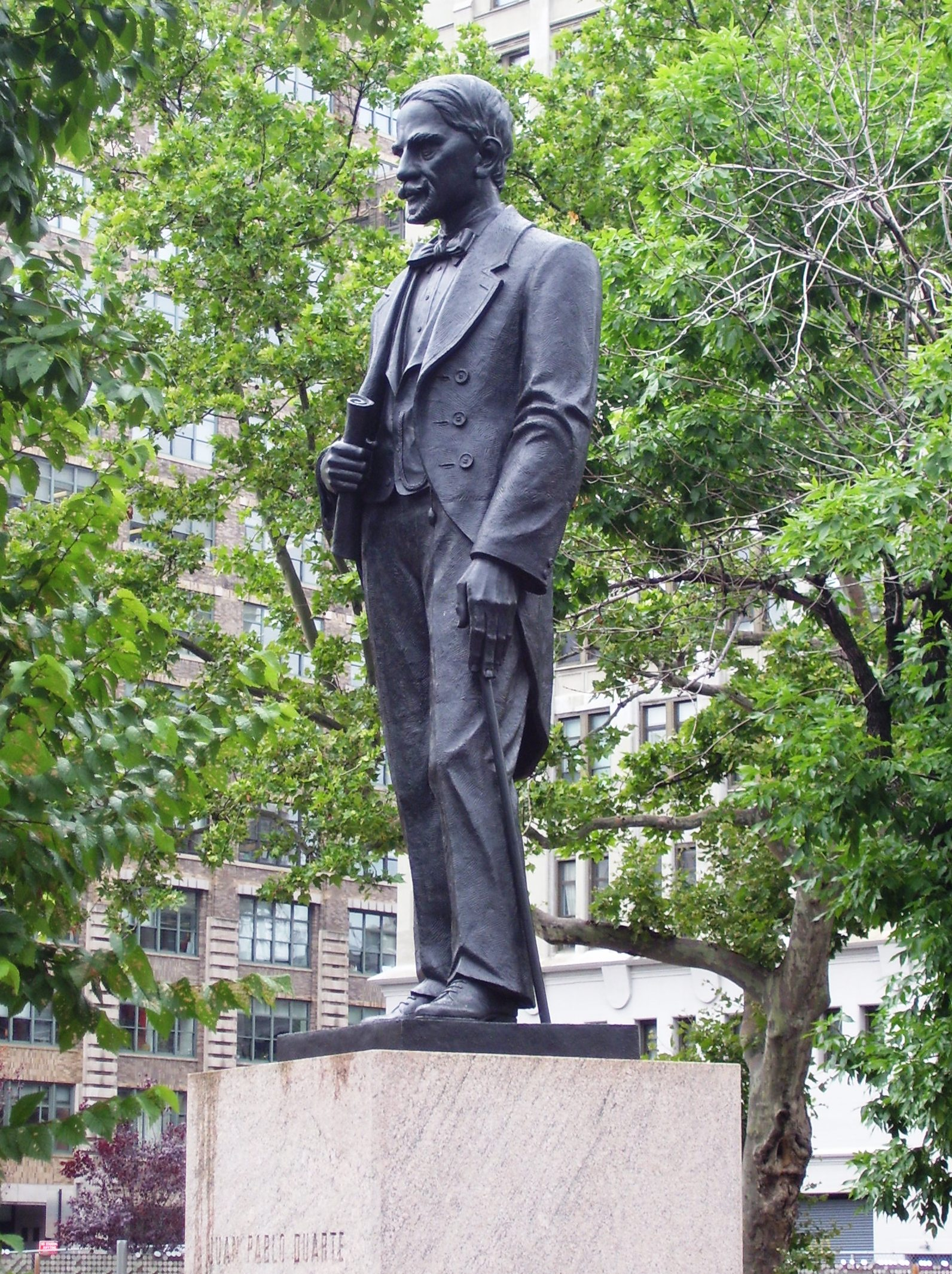
Statue of Juan Pablo Duarte in Duarte Square, In New York City, New York, United States.

Duarte birthplace was converted into a museum. The Duarte-Diez family lived there from their arrival in Santo Domingo until their exile.

- Duarte's birth is commemorated by Dominicans every January 26 as a national holiday.
- Many places in the Dominican Republic bear his name, among them the country's (and the Caribbean's) highest point, Pico Duarte.
- The province of Duarte is named after him.
- The Villa Duarte section in Santo Domingo is named in his honor.
- Duarte is solely depicted on the one Dominican peso coin; he is also depicted on the 100 Dominican peso note alongside Sánchez and Mella.
- A memorial to Duarte stands in Roger Williams Park in Providence, Rhode Island
- Broad St. in Providence, Rhode Island co-named Juan Pablo Duarte Boulevard
- In 1945, a plaza was dedicated to Duarte, Duarte Square, at the corner of 6th Avenue and Canal Street, in New York City.
- A bronze statue to Duarte was erected at the intersection of 6th Avenue and Canal Street in New York City in 1978.
- St. Nicholas Avenue in Manhattan is co-named Juan Pablo Duarte Boulevard from Amsterdam Avenue and West 162nd Street to the intersection of West 193rd Street and Fort George Hill.
- [Puente Juan Pablo Duarte] is a suspension bridge that is located in Santo Domingo; it was named after him.
- An athletic complex named in his honor, Centro Olímpico Juan Pablo Duarte, is currently under preservation.
- Juan Pablo Duarte metro station is an underground interchange station located in the Santo Domingo Metro; it still carries his name.
- A bust of Duarte at the Permanent Mission of the Dominican Republic to the Organization of American States was dedicated in 2010.
- On February 24, 2011, in commemoration of the 167th anniversary of the national Dominican independence, a statue of Duarte was inaugurated in the Mário Soares Garden, in front of the Dominican embassy in Lisbon.
- On September 4, 2023, the Dominican embassy in Egypt unveiled the first official bust of Duarte in the continent of Africa. It is located in the "La Libertad" park in Cairo.

== Works ==
- Tristezas de la noche
- Santana
- Canto de guerra
- Antífona
- El Criollo
- Desconsuelo
- Suplica
- Himno
- La Cartera del procrito
- Romántica

== See also ==
- Father of the Nation
- History of the Dominican Republic
- Dominican War of Independence
- Dominican Restoration War
- Juan Sánchez Ramírez
- José Núñez de Cáceres
- Francisco del Rosario Sánchez
- Matías Ramón Mella
- José Joaquín Puello
- La Trinitaria
- Pedro Santana
- Buenaventura Báez
- Tomás Bobadilla
- Gregorio Luperón
- Eugenio María de Hostos
- José Martí

== Bibliography ==
- Cassá, Roberto (2014). Personajes dominicanos [Dominican Characters] (in Spanish). Comisión Permanente de Efemérides Patrias. ISBN 978-9945-586-04-6.
- Duarte, Rosa. Apuntes para la historia de la isla de Santo Domingo y para la biografía del general dominicano Juan Pablo Duarte y Diez. Santo Domingo, 1994.
- García, José Gabriel. Compendio de la historia de Santo Domingo. 4 vols. Santo Domingo, 1968.
- García, José Gabriel. Rasgos biográficos de dominicanos célebres. Santo Domingo, 1971.
- García Lluberes, Alcides. Duarte y otros temas. Santo Domingo, 1971.
- García Lluberes, Leonidas. Crítica histórica. Santo Domingo, 1964.
- Martínez, Rufino. Diccionario biográfico-histórico dominicano. Santo Domingo, 1997.
- Tena Reyes, Jorge (ed.). Duarte en la historiografía dominicana. Santo Domingo, 1994.
- Selden Rodman, Quisqueya: A History of the Dominican Republic (1964).
- Howard J. Wiarda, The Dominican Republic: Nation in Transition (1969).
- Ian Bell, The Dominican Republic (1981).
- Howard J. Wiarda, and MJ Kryzanek, The Dominican Republic: A Caribbean Crucible (1982).

=== Additional Bibliography ===
- Duarte, Juan Pablo, and Vetilio Alfau Durán. Duarte's ideology, and his project and constitution. Santo Domingo: CPEP, Permanent Commission of Batrias Ephemerides, 2006.
- Martínez-Fernández, Luis. Torn between Empires: Economy, Society, and Patterns of Political Thought in the Hispanic Caribbean, 1840–1878. Athens: University of Georgia Press, 1994.
- Miniño, Manuel Marino. Duarte's thought in its historical and ideological context. Santo Domingo: Duartiano Institute, 1998.
