= Manuela Díez Jiménez =

Dominican activist (1786–1858)

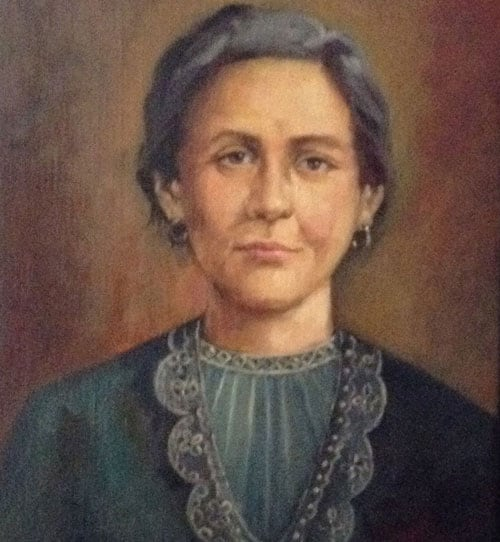
- Portrait of Manuela Díez Jiménez
- Born: June 26, 1786; El Seibo, Dominican Republic
- Died: December 31, 1858 (aged 72); Caracas, Venezuela
- Known for: Activist
- Family: Juan Pablo Duarte; Rosa Duarte

Manuela Díez Jiménez (June 26, 1786 – December 31, 1858) was a key female figure in the forming of the independence of the Dominican Republic. She was the mother of Juan Pablo Duarte, the founder of the Dominican Republic, or the so-called father of the nation. She greatly supported the rise of the secret society La Trinitaria by hiding its members and organizing meetings, which eventually lead to the liberation of the nation.

== Biography ==
She was born on June 26, 1786, in El Seibo, Dominican Republic, daughter of Antonio Díez, a natural emigrant from Osorno, a town in the province of Palencia, Spain, and Rufina Jiménez Benítez, a criollo native of Santa Cruz de El Seibo, Dominican Republic. She had three brothers: Antonio, born in El Seibo on March 31, 1788, died in the same city on November 6, 1790; Mariano, born July 2, 1790; José Acupernico, born on September 21, 1791.

== Brief move to Puerto Rico and return ==
She left the island with her family in 1801 due to the invasion of Toussaint Louverture. She was forced to immigrated to Mayaguez, Puerto Rico. She didn't return until 1809, in which year the Dominican Republic became a Spanish colony once again.

She nurtured and supported the intellectual formation of her sons and daughters, as well as the ideas that gave rise to the birth of the Trinitarios. He endured with fortitude the persecution and surveillance in his home, while her son remained hidden during the conspiracy process that expelled him from the country.

Already in 1843, she had to assume the leadership of her household in conflict due to the persecution of the Haitian Government, when she became a widow in November of that year; At that time Juan Pablo Duarte was in foreign exile. At his request, she decided to put the family assets recently inherited from her father at the service of the patriotic cause, which demonstrates the firmness of patriotic ideals and dedication to the cause.

Manuela Diez's most joyous moment was when, once her country became independent, she welcomed Juan Pablo Duarte home from exile. On that occasion she accepted Francisco del Rosario Sánchez's demand that, despite the recent mourning, the doors of the house, full of people, be opened and a flag be placed in the window.

Manuela Diez saw her family and permanent daily life affected by the political activities that took place within her, not as a simple mother who agreed to be supportive of her sons and daughters, but as a militant activity of the ideals that she had contributed to sowing in the heart of the Trinitarian group.

Manuela Jiménez supported the rise of the secret society "La Trinitaria" by actively hiding its members and organizing secret meetings.

This led to her being persecuted by a raid for her contribution to the political life of her children and their accomplices. On March 3, 1845, she was expelled from the country and she fled from the Dominican Republic by Pedro Santana's government to Venezuela.

== Personal life ==
She married the Spanish merchant Juan José Duarte in 1800, with whom she had the following children:

- Vicente Celestino Duarte (1802–1865)
- María Josefa Duarte (1810–1843)
- Manuel (1811–1811)
- Juan Pablo Duarte (1813–1876), Father of the Nation
- Ana María Duarte (1814–1816)
- Manuel Duarte (1816–1818)
- Philomena Duarte (1818–1865)
- Rosa Duarte (1820–1888)
- Juana Bautista Duarte (1824–1843)
- Manuel Amáralos María Duarte (1826–1890)
- Maria Francisca Duarte (1831–1889)
- Amara Duarte Duarte (1831–1889)

She died on December 31, 1858 on in Caracas, Venezuela.

== Literary appearances ==
In the poem by Ramón Emilio Jiménez mentions Manuela Díez Jiménez one of the responsible figures for the formation of Juan Pablo Duarte's patriotic character to lead the nation.

== Honors ==
There is a street in Santo Domingo, named after her. Moreover, there are more than a few schools in Dominican Republic in which she is named patron and they bear her name. It extends from Albert Thomas, in the capital's María Auxiliadora neighborhood, to Hermanos Pinzón, in Villa Consuelo. Probably the only tribute that the mother of the Father of the Nation has received. In addition to other small streets of lesser importance, such as in the Los Frailes II sector in Santo Domingo Este. Also some schools in various parts of the Dominican Republic.

== See also ==
- Juan Pablo Duarte
- Rosa Duarte
