= Rosa Duarte =

Dominican revolutionary and performer (1820–1888)

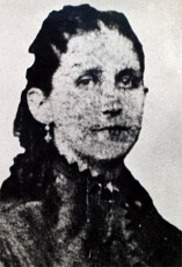
- Born: June 28, 1820; Santo Domingo, Captaincy General of Santo Domingo
- Died: October 26, 1888 (aged 68); Caracas, Venezuela
- Occupation: Revolutionary
- Parents: Juan José Duarte (father); Manuela Díez Jiménez (mother)
- Relatives: Juan Pablo Duarte (brother)
- Awards: National hero

Rosa Protomártir Duarte y Díez (June 28, 1820 – October 26, 1888) was a Dominican revolutionary dedicated to the patriotic cause towards Dominican independence. Her contributions to the Dominican Republic are considered by the historian Emilio Rodríguez Demorizi as the "New Testament" of Dominican history.

Rosa was one of the sisters of Juan Pablo Duarte, an activist politician and one of the founding fathers of the Dominican Republic. Following her older brother's steps, Rosa strongly supported the Dominican independent cause by actively participating in secret societies such as La Trinitaria and La Filantrópica.

== Family origins ==
Duarte was born in the city of Santo Domingo, more precisely, in a neighborhood called Santa Bárbara, on June 28, 1820. She was the daughter of Juan José Duarte, a Spaniard from Vejer de la Frontera in Southern Spain, and Manuela Díez Jiménez, a white Dominican or Criollo woman from El Seibo. Her elder brother, Juan Pablo Duarte, is today remembered as the Father of Nation of the Dominican Republic. She received baptismal waters in the Parish of the Santa Iglesia Catedral de Santo Domingo on July 8, 1820, then she was barely ten days old. Her baptismal certificate says:

In the city of Santo Domingo, July eight, one thousand eight hundred and twenty years, I, the undersigned Lieutenant Priest of this Holy Church Cathedral, solemnly baptized, placed holy oil and chrism on Rosa Protomártir, who was born on the twenty-eighth of June next, the legitimate daughter of Dn. Juan José Duarte y Da. Manuela Díez, natives and our parishioners were her godparents Mr. Manuel Ferrer and his wife Vicenta de la Cuebas to whom I warned of their obligations and spiritual kinship: Tgos. Dn. Ramón López and Dn. Andrés Rozon. That I attest to.

Influenced by her brother's ideals, Rosa devoted her life to his patriotic cause, becoming an active member of the political and military, independentist secret society called La Trinitaria. Her contributions towards the Dominican nation are considered by the historian Emilio Rodríguez Demorizi as the "New Testament" of the Dominican history. She was a woman of natural talent and outstanding virtues who preserved her state of purity until the end of her days, preserving all the noble and delicate feelings that her parents instilled in her with a careful education. She always paid special worship to patriotism, which neither the injustice of men nor the rigor of misfortune could mitigate in her.

Rosa and her group of friends participated in plays performed at a building that used to be an old jail --Cárcel Vieja--, located next to Borgellá Palace, in front of Parque Colon. From that strategic place, she and other activists would raise awareness about the independent cause. With these plays, this group of people would collect resources in order to buy ammunition and cover the expenses for the Dominican independent cause.

In the preparations for the proclamation of Independence, Rosa Duarte, together with other women, manufactured a large quantity of the bullets used by the movement. These representations, in addition to keeping the public spirit raised, also served to obtain resources in order to purchase ammunition and cover the expenses of the emissaries who would be sent to carry out missions to different parts of the country

== Rosa Duarte's Diary ==
Rosa Duarte was able to keep important notes about the life of Juan Pablo Duarte and his contributions to the cultural and political development of the young people of his time. It stands out that during the fight to create the Republic, Father Gaspar Hernández taught philosophy to the young people and Juan Pablo Duarte, languages.

She describes how the young people accepted Duarte as their leader, since he acted without prejudice and without discriminating for social, racial or economic reasons. In the notes Rosa indicates that Juan Pablo acted with a patriotic spirit and all the young people who attended his classes “he taught with pleasure without making distinctions of class or color, which attracted him undeniable popularity.” Rosa Duarte's notes constitute an important source to know the stage of struggle of the Trinitarios and the difficulties they faced. (They were published by the Duartiano Institute in 1970).

Her notes, a contribution of incalculable value to our country, are considered by Emilio Rodríguez Demorizi as the "New Testament" of the history of the Dominican Republic, since through this document the details of those years of conspiracy and work for the liberation of the Homeland. In them he says: “God has preserved my ability to think and remember and has also granted me the sacred right to protest against traitors to the Homeland.

Rosa, aware of her brother's enemies, zealously took care of her brother, even if it meant withholding information from his trusted allies. One said example included when Francisco del Rosario Sánchez, who was sent to San José de los Llanos on a patriotic errand before Vicente Celestino Duarte, and there he learned of that Charles Rivière-Hérard, the new president of Haiti, had issued a national manhunt for the Trinitarios. Realizing that the life of his leader and best friend was in danger, he mounted his horse and left for the capital with the decision to save Duarte or die in that patriotic purpose, unmatched expression of human solidarity.

This period solidified Sánchez's loyalty to the cause, and to Duarte. He threw himself into the Ozama River ferociously maneuvering through the waters as the authorities were in hot pursuit. Upon arriving at the family home, he was horrified to discover that Haitian soldiers have the house under siege. Sánchez, somehow, managed to elude the soldiers and enter the house, where he meets Rosa and her sister Francisca. He inquires where Juan Pablo is there, they say they do not know his whereabouts; But, Sánchez does not believe such a version, so he goes to the head of the family, Juan José Duarte Rodríguez, he asks him the question, and he remains silent. In the face of such silence, Sánchez unsheathes a sharp dagger, firmly tells the elderly man:

Don Juan, I want to know where Juan Pablo is, because we are bound by a sacred oath and that is to die together for the country; If you distrust me, I will prove to you that I am not one of the traitors, by launching myself with this dagger at those troops that surround his house.

Finally convinced that his intentions were truly pure, Juan José responded to Sánchez:

Save him, I do not distrust the son of the generous man who saved the lives of three Spaniards who a slander condemned to an infamous death; As proof of this, tell me, where is he waiting for you?

Sánchez, now full of joy, answers: "In the Plaza del Carmen, in front of my house!" Juan José stated in response: "At ten o'clock tonight, he will be with you." Then, Juan Pablo's father sends him the message with a young man who enjoyed the family trust, Joaquín Lluberes, so that he can meet his friend Sánchez at the agreed place and time; But, Lluberes returns and informs the worried father that both María ia Baltasara de los Reyes and her son, Juan Alejandro Acosta, would not let him leave, since dozens of men were hidden outside the house ready to prevent Duarte from leaving risk leaving or risk leaving or being taken away by his Haitian persecutors.

However, in the end, after overcoming numerous obstacles, Duarte and Sánchez meet and have a meeting at the latter's house, with the faithful, pure and consistent friends Pedro Alejandro Pina and Juan Isidro Pérez also participating.

These events occurred in the first fortnight of July 1843, the situation experienced by Duarte and his companions could not have been more difficult, continuous changes of hiding places under the darkness of the night, constant information that places were being discovered, many times traveling without knowing with certainty the final destination, he even took refuge in front of the Duarte-Díez family home, where Eusebio Puello's family resided.

In relation to Juan Pablo's stay in this place, Rosa Duarte specifies: "The days he spent there were not so bitter, because, although his parents and family were unaware that he was there, he enjoyed contemplating them at times and their sight mitigated the regret of his hazardous situation."

The raids on the Duarte-Díez house, searches of Juan José's warehouse, the home of José Díez's maternal uncle, the tenacious persecutions against other patriots, created a true state of siege; In the midst of everything, Juan Pablo manages to survive, his life, his family, his companions in the patriotic cause are saved, until the favorable action of the Haitian officer Hipólito Franquil, Duarte's Freemason brother, and the "repentant" Dominican traitor himself who reported to Duarte that a price had been put on his head. In the middle of the darkness of the night on August 2, 1843, a brig set sail for Saint Thomas, arriving on August 11, and then, seven days later, they left for La Guaira, and arrived at the capital, Caracas, where their maternal uncle Prudencio Díez receives them.

== Exile ==
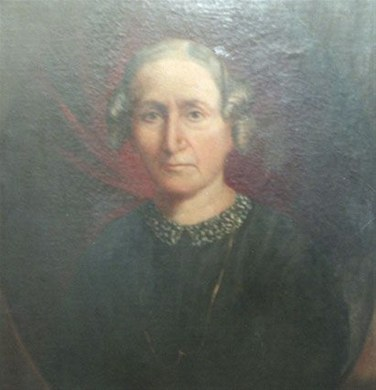
Painting of Rosa Duarte c. 1870s–1880s

Throughout the process to create the Dominican state, Rosa Duarte was a permanent collaborator, but after the Republic was proclaimed, she suffered political persecution from the government of President Pedro Santana and was then expelled from the national territory with her family. The first to be exiled was Juan Pablo Duarte and several of the Trinitarios. In 1845, Rosa was condemned to leave her homeland and was deported along with her mother and siblings, thus leaving behind her fiancée, Tomás de la Concha, who was executed in 1855 together with the soldier Antonio Duverge.

After her brother's death in 1876, she wanted to return to the country, but although in 1883 the Dominican state offered facilities for the return of the Duarte family, her brother Manuel refused to return to the land from which they had been expelled without any consideration.

== Death ==
On October 26, 1888, Rosa died in Caracas, Venezuela, due to dysentery.

Her siblings died two years after she did.

== Honors ==
One of the main streets in Santo Domingo is called Rosa Duarte in her honor. The street goes from Bolívar Avenue until 27 de Febrero Avenue. There is also a metro station in Santo Domingo named after her.

== See also ==
- Juan Pablo Duarte
- Manuela Díez Jiménez
- Dominican War of Independence
