= Filomena Gómez de Cova =

Dominican revolutionary (1800–1893)

Filomena Gómez de Cova (1800 – March 9, 1893) was a Dominican militant who participated in the Dominican War of Independence. Gómez, born into a long-established Dominican family, was a woman with broader horizons than other women of her time. Gómez brought Gardenia jasminoides ('jazmín de la India'; 'jazmín del Cabo') (Note: Jazmín de Malabar is a common name sometimes given to Gardenia jasminoides as well as to the wild jasmine, Jasminum malabaricum, possibly from confusion with the gardenia's other Spanish vernacular names jazmín de la India and jazmín del Cabo. The Duartian flower is the gardenia, not the wild jasmine.) plants from Venezuela, whose white flower served as a Duartian symbol in the hair of Dominican women and in the buttonhole on the chest of the heroes in the days of the Trinitarios. "Filorios" was the derogatory nickname given to the Trinitarios, which is why the flower became known as filoria in the Dominican Republic.

== Family ==
Filomena Gómez Grateró was born in 1800, during the difficult years of the French regime of the Dominican Republic, daughter of Don Joaquín Gómez Márquez and Dona Juana Carlota Grateró.

Gómez married twice, first to Francisco Marcano, on April 29, 1820, who died the following year in a shipwreck off the coast of Haiti when he was returning from Cuba, where he had gone to receive his law degree. The second marriage was with Lucas de la Cova, on March 23, 1829, by proxy, since he was in Saint Thomas. He waited there for his wife to join him, before continuing his trip to Europe. They then settled in Venezuela from where they traveled around the world. Don Lucas died on August 7, 1854.

== Death and legacy ==
Gómez is credited with bringing the gardenia flower, called filoria, with her from Caracas. The filoria served as a distinctive symbol for the young supporters of the independence cause, who proudly displayed it in their hair, in a buttonhole or at the shoulder or neckline of their dresses. Likewise, the heroes wore this white flower on their hearts during the days of the Trinitaria.

A street in Santo Domingo, Filomena Gómez de Cova Street, was named in her honor.

Gómez died in the city of Santo Domingo on March 9, 1893. She was 93 years old.

== See also ==
- Ana Valverde
- Concepción Bona
