= Rosa Duarte metro station =

Santo Domingo metro station

Rosa Duarte

General information
- Location: Santo Domingo; The Dominican Republic
- Coordinates: 18°30′37.4″N 69°52′10.8″W
- System: Santo Domingo Metro station
- Line: Line 2

History
- Opened: 9 August 2018

Services
Preceding station	Santo Domingo Metro	Following station
Ercilia Pepin toward María Montez	Line 2	Trina de Moya de Vasquez toward Concepción Bona
Location

Rosa Duarte is a Santo Domingo Metro station on Line 2. It was opened on 9 August 2018 as part of the section of Line 2 between Eduardo Brito and Concepción Bona. The station is located between Ercilia Pepin and Trina de Moya de Vasquez.

This is an underground station built below Avenida San Vicente de Paúl. It is named in honor of Rosa Duarte.
