= María Trinidad Sánchez =

Dominican revolutionary and activist (1794–1845)

Maria Trinidad Sánchez
- Born: June 16, 1794; Santo Domingo, Captaincy General of Santo Domingo
- Died: February 27, 1845 (aged 50); Santo Domingo, Dominican Republic
- Cause of death: Execution by firing squad
- Resting place: National Pantheon of the Dominican Republic
- Occupations: Activist and Teacher
- Years active: 1823–1845
- Parents: Fernando Raimundo Sánchez (father); Isidora Ramona (mother)
- Relatives: Francisco del Rosario Sánchez (nephew); Socorro Sánchez del Rosario (niece)

María Trinidad Sánchez (June 16, 1794 – February 27, 1845) also known by her nickname, Mother Founder, was an advocate of independence from Spain involved in Dominican War of Independence. She participated on the rebel side as a courier. Together with Concepción Bona, Isabel Sosa and María de Jesús Pina, she took part in designing the Dominican flag. She was executed after having refused to betray her collaborators in exchange for her life. The María Trinidad Sánchez Province is named after her. Her remains rest in the National Pantheon of the Dominican Republic in Santo Domingo.

== Background ==
=== Family origins ===
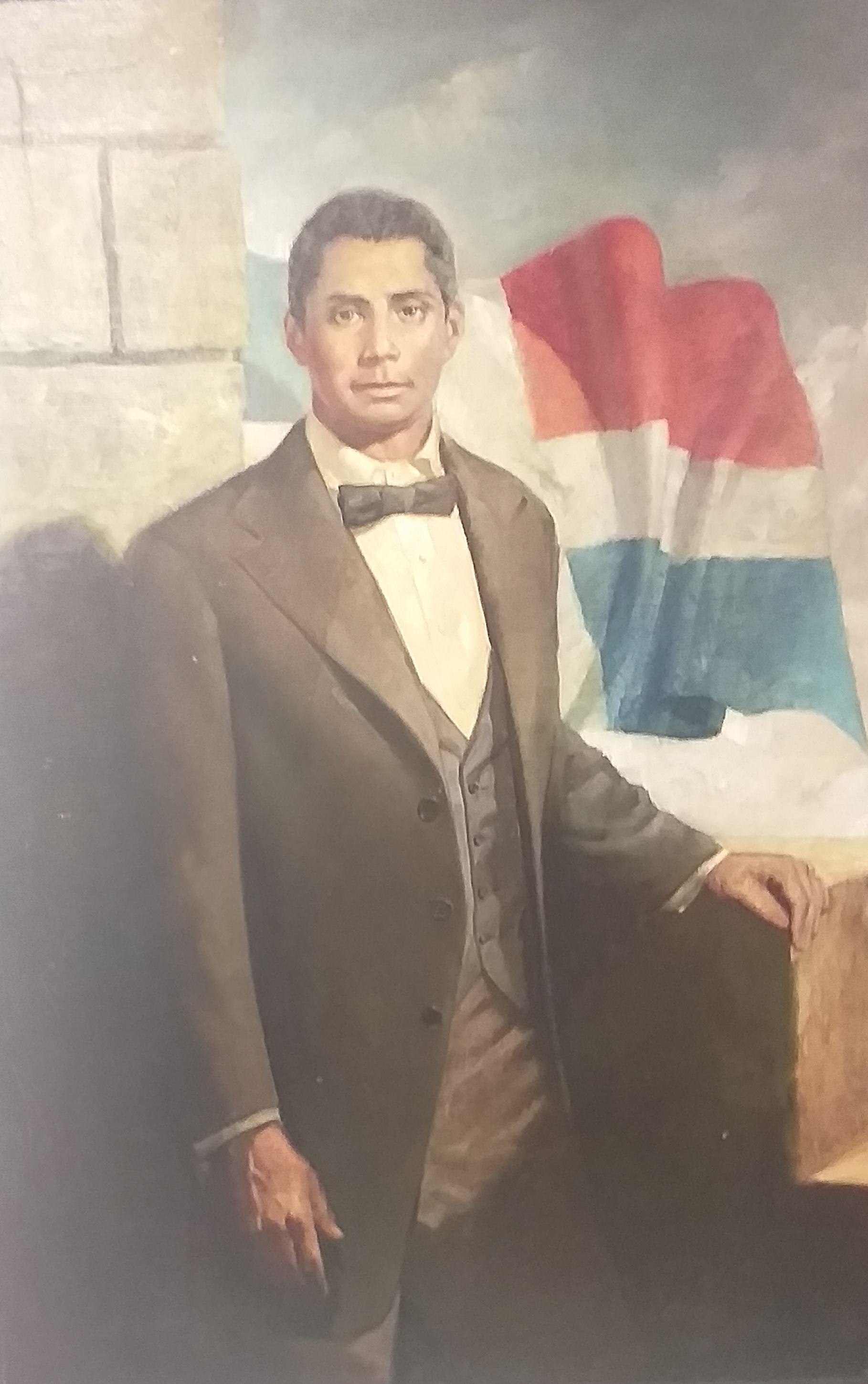
Maria Trinidad Sánchez was heavily involved in the teaching of her nieces and nephews, especially Francisco del Rosario Sánchez.

She was born on June 16, 1794, in the city of Santo Domingo. She was the only daughter of Isidora Ramona, a formerly enslaved woman, and Fernando Raimundo Sánchez, a freedman. She was baptised at 14 days old. She had 4 brothers, Francisco, Narciso, Dionsio, and José.

Se lived in a humble hut, made of palm boards, located on La Luna Street (today Sánchez), in an area occupied by the poor. She was considered one of the best seamstresses in the city. She was like a second mother to her nieces and nephews and is recognized as having been a key figure in the initial education of Francisco del Rosario Sánchez, her nephew and one of the fathers of the country.

In the opinion of historian Roberto Cassá, Sánchez, who had slave ancestors, "showed a personality consistent with the stereotypes of the time.” Regarding Trinidad Sánchez, the author Ramón Lugo Lovatón assured that she was a friend of sententious phrases and strange anecdotes. She was also characterized by her marked religiosity and she was considered a saint, who wore a virgin's habit and performed penances. She was part of a community in the Carmen parish. She normally wore a habit of that virgin, with which she performed frequent penances that attracted the attention of his neighbors. Originally in the 17th century, the Carmen church was conceived as a chapel for a slave brotherhood, a function that may have continued during the 18th century. This relationship corresponded with the modest condition of Trinidad, who lived in a plank hut in the southern part of Calle de la Luna, which currently bears the name of Sánchez. In colonial times, the western portion of the city served as a residence for poor or humble people, since most of the buildings were made of boards and yaguas and were interspersed with lots that were used as small conucos. Over time, Trinidad Sánchez established a deep relationship with the nuns of the Santa Clara convent, located on the eastern fringe of the walled city. The link with these may indicate that Trinidad Sánchez had achieved social recognition thanks to its industriousness and deep religiosity.

She never married and had no children. Family memories do not clarify, however, whether she abstained from any form of marriage, although it is probable, given her mysticism. As part of that build, she was concerned about leading a dignified life, which is why she became known as one of the seamstresses with the best mastery of the trade in the city. The concern that women tended to assume for cultural reproduction, along with an ideal of social and spiritual improvement of offspring, was applied by Trinidad Sánchez to her nephew Francisco, whom she made the object of her preferences. In a way, she acted like a second mother to her nephews, actively collaborating in all household matters, shoulder to shoulder with her sister-in-law, Olaya del Rosario Belen, Francisco's mother. The family chronicle shows that the initial education received by Sánchez was due to the efforts, within the strict home horizon, of his mother and aunt. To a considerable extent, the aunt also had an impact on the young man's later life, since “she was always a woman of numerous and magnificent friends with whom Francisco interacted.”

=== Early conspiracies ===
As was required, Trinidad Sánchez had no interest in politics. However, there is no doubt that she shared her brother's point of view against Haitian domination. The social position of Narciso Sánchez, as has been seen, of promotion processes since the colonial phase, explains his hostility to the Haitian regime established in 1822 by Jean-Pierre Boyer, despite the measures he took in favor of slaves and freedmen. Despite his humble origins, Narciso frequented high places, which led him to share his points of view. Lugo Lovatón assures that “he was fond of Spain,” among other things because his father Fernando “lived contentedly and in peace when the ‘whites’ who emigrated when Toussaint Louverture invaded.” Hence, when, in 1824, the promulgation of measures aimed at the destruction of the large traditional livestock property, gave rise to an aborted rebellion against the Haitian regime, Narciso Sánchez joined the conspiracy through Agustín Acosta, one of the ringleaders. The authorities learned of the plot through the denunciation of a subject whom Narciso had informed of some plans. For this reason, he was arrested along with other conspirators; but while several received sentences, Narciso was only the subject of a severe reprimand for not having communicated what he knew.

From then on, Narciso Sánchez limited himself to daily life, like almost the entire population, but his views must have influenced his son Francisco, although in a relative way. The father, although in favor of the break from Haiti, did not have a national conception, since he was overcome with skepticism about the political potential of the Dominican people. Tradition relates that, on the occasion of appointments to important public positions of people lacking merit, he expressed to his son: “Convince yourself, Francisco; This may be a country, but it will never be a nation.” This conviction explains why he did not get involved in political affairs again and that he even implicitly harbored certain illusions about the annexation of 1861, despite the execution of his son at the beginning.

== Independence plot ==
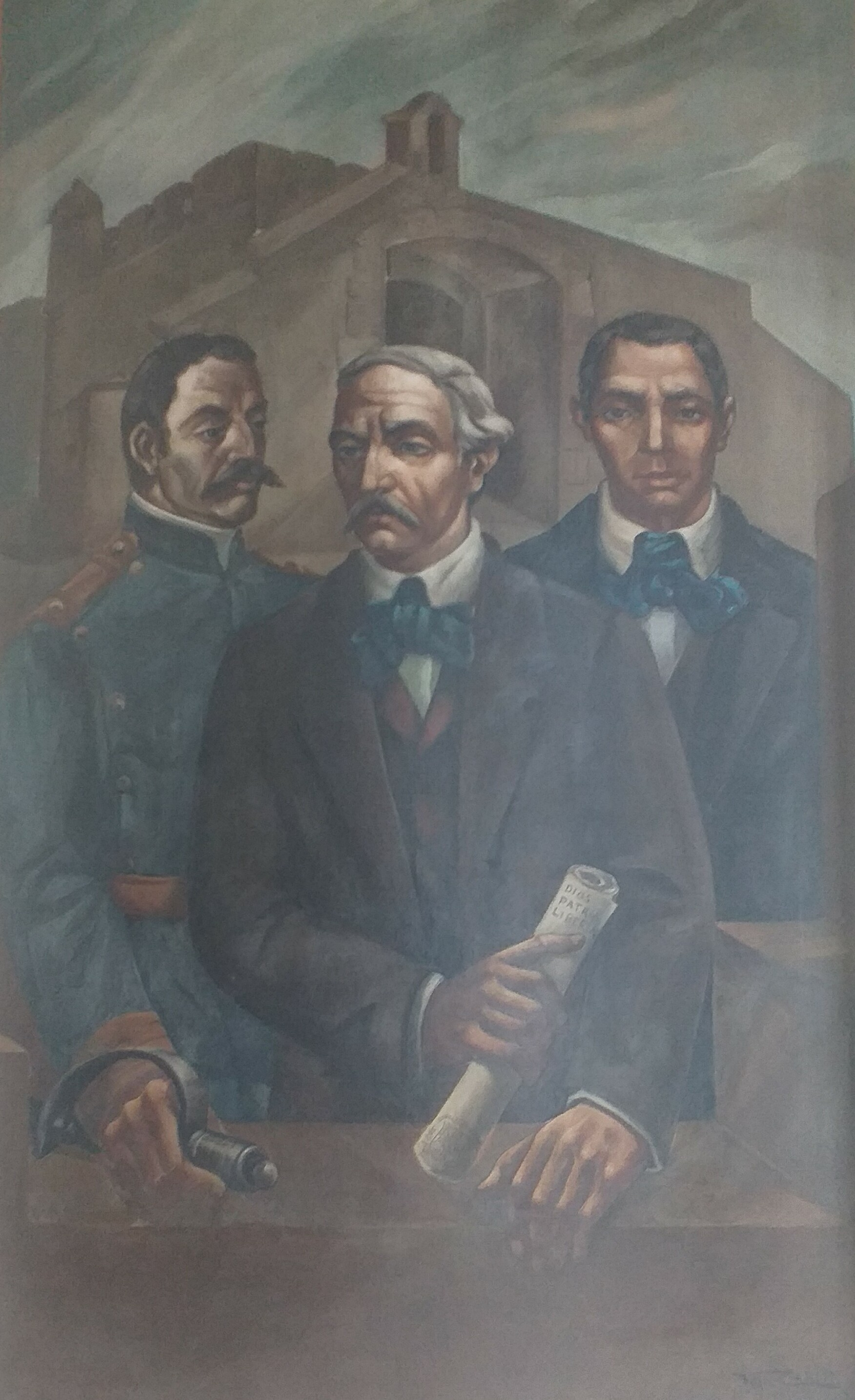
Monument of Duarte, Sánchez and Mella

Trinidad Sánchez was actively involved in the struggle that led to the founding of the Dominican Republic. She was not the only woman who took part in the great event, which can be understood in light of the consensus reached by the urban sectors on the convenience of liberating Santo Domingo from Haiti. Now, as Vetilio Alfau Durán highlights, in the plethora of Februaryists, Trinidad occupied the most prominent place. Other women who participated in the preparations for the revolt or in subsequent actions were Concepción Bona, Manuela Díez Jiménez, Rosa Duarte, María Baltasara de los Reyes, Josefa Pérez de la Paz, Ana Valverde, María de Jesús Pina, the Villa sisters and Juana Saltitopa.

It can be concluded that the exceptional prominence of Trinidad Sánchez was due to her status as aunt of the person who was in charge of the conspiratorial efforts of the young liberal democrats of La Trinitaria. This is undoubtedly true, since Trinidad Sánchez joined the work through her nephew, but it does not explain everything, since her participation cannot be reduced to accidental and passive support. In reality, she was externalizing the patriotic convictions that were part of the cultural heritage that allowed Francisco del Rosario Sánchez such a relevant political role.

From the moment when Sánchez was subject to persecution by the Haitian authorities, he had the help of his aunt. Shortly after leaving his home, after a brief refuge with the Alfonseca sisters, close friends of his parents, he hid Trinidad Sánchez's home, where he became ill, a circumstance that allowed him to spread the rumor that he had died. It was in that house where Dr. Manuel Guerrero cured Sánchez. He took advantage of a hidden cistern in the patio to take refuge when the authorities requisitioned the home. But he decided to leave the Trinidad Sánchez's home, aware that his pursuers suspected he was there, and had to change hiding places on several occasions. That did not prevent his aunt from continuing to visit him when it was feasible, determined to collaborate with the patriotic struggle.

During the months prior to independence, when it became clear to the general population that such an objective was set, Trinidad Sánchez began to have greater weight in conspiratorial activities, a time when surely no other woman did so in such an active and responsible manner. It is deduced that she was simply part of the group as another member of the group. This is what explains that after Sánchez changed hiding places, the aunt continued to be busy carrying messages and helping move him from one place to another.

Furthermore, when the time comes for the coup against Haitian domination, Trinidad Sánchez was in charge of making capsules for the few weapons that the conspirators had. She took part in the preparations for the pronouncement, and on the night of February 27, according to José María Serra de Castro, “she carried gunpowder in his own skirts” to distribute it among those who showed up at the Baluarte del Conde with firearms. Family tradition also relates that, because she was a seamstress, she hastily sewed a flag, adding a white cross to the Haitian flag, before the one made by Concepción Bona arrived.

Certainly, February 27, 1844 was a very special day, when hundreds of people from the city gathered, including the elderly, women and young people. Once the Separation was achieved, the women returned to daily life, although the danger of Haitian attacks remained. In any case, the active participation of women was no longer necessary, so Trinidad, like others, disappeared from the traces left by the chronicles. That does not mean that she remained completely passive, since what happened on February 27, 1844, is recorded in much more detail than the subsequent events.

Months later, the Trinitarios were defeated by the conservative annexationists in July 1844, and Francisco del Rosario Sánchez was deported along with his main companions, Juan Pablo Duarte and Matías Ramón Mella, accused of treason. Pedro Santana, thanks to his military prestige, began to exercise a dictatorship as leader of the conservative clique of supporters of the French protectorate. This dictatorship was legalized by article 210 of the Constitution promulgated in San Cristóbal in November 1844, which stipulated that the president could monopolize full powers whenever he considered that the country was in danger.

== Conspiracy against Santana ==
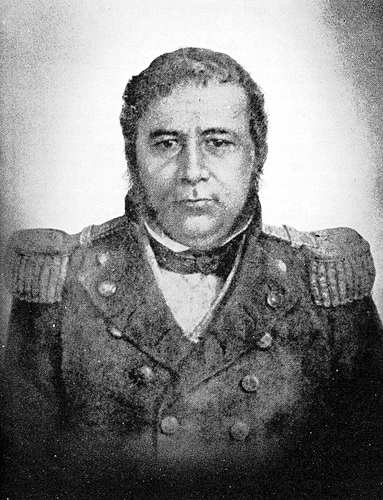
Like many others, Trinidad Sánchez became distrustful with the conservative officials, especially General Pedro Santana.

Trinidad Sánchez's persistent willingness to take action is demonstrated by its participation in the conspiracy that was forged in the city of Santo Domingo beginning in the last days of 1844, in order to achieve the return of the Trinitarios exiled a few months before. Various people had approached Pedro Santana to intercede on behalf of the young liberals, to which the tyrant responded that it was not possible because the members of his cabinet, according to him, were in favor of keeping out the outlaws. It is true that the recently promulgated Constitution stipulated that the acts of the president, in his capacity as head of the Executive Branch, had to be endorsed by the ministry. However, it is evident that he was the architect of the banning of Trinitario leaders and that he had no disagreements with his ministers in this regard. Santana simply tried to evade responsibilities in the situation to make himself as likable as possible, a subterfuge that was also part of the beginnings of the silent rivalry that he began to maintain with Tomás Bobadilla, who then directed the daily actions of the government, to the degree of known as the “universal minister.” Santana, however, claimed absolute personal power, so that the ministers were completely subordinated to him. The response he gave to the requests indicates that he was already maneuvering stealthily to curtail the power of his conservative associates. A little more than two years later, the conflict of interests would focus between Santana and Bobadilla, in which the former was victorious.

Meanwhile, at the end of 1844, these responses raised hopes that it would be feasible to reverse the prevailing situation with no less than the help of Santana. With his tricks, he stimulated a movement that started from an act of naivety: the intention of achieving the return of the Trinitarios on the basis of achieving the overthrow of the ministry and the expansion of Santana's powers. A statement against the government was planned to be held in the Plaza de Armas, aimed at overthrowing it. Those who opposed should be eliminated immediately.

There is no clarity about whether, in addition to those who were discovered, other people were involved in the plot. It was speculated that behind the conspirators were some high-level officials, among them the Minister of War, Manuel Jiménes, who was never a supporter of Santana and disputed positions with Bobadilla. It is known that María Trinidad Sánchez, her nephew Andrés Sánchez and several other people established contacts with active military personnel, who agreed to compromise, with the understanding that the ministers would be deposed and dictatorial powers would be attributed to Santana. This coincidence indicates that the tyrant had been able to confuse the discontented, to cast the blame that belonged to himself on his subordinates. Manuel Joaquín del Monte, in his chronicle about the events that occurred between 1838 and 1845, considers that the idea of the conspiracy came from the deception of which Trinidad was a victim, eager for her nephew to return, who believed the version of a sergeant who was serving service in Santana's house, that he would proceed in that sense if he were named dictator. This sergeant involved other soldiers, until one of them decided that Santana should be brought up to speed.

It is likely that not all the threads were exposed, as perhaps there were experienced people behind those who were prosecuted. In any case, the conspirators showed signs of naivety, which raises doubts about the scope of what they were doing. Contrary to what some of the conspirators expected, as soon as he heard about the plot, Santana decided to punish the plotters with extreme severity, aware that an act of this nature weakened conservative power and could harm it in the long run. As indicated by the letter he sent to Bobadilla, who seems to have been the first to receive the complaint although he was initially skeptical about its veracity, Santana ratified his trust in the super minister and set out to dismantle the conspiracy. He realized that, although the purpose was to elevate him to the status of dictator, the order he represented was questioned. The terrible spelling of the obituary shows the cultural level of the person who began to manage the country as his El Prado ranch.

Very dear Don Tomás: I was surprised by your obituary regarding what Ur. measured about the coup to overthrow the ministry. I believe that this could be false and if this were so it would be an attack. I will try to inform myself and prevent any disorder that has arisen. I do not believe it, I repeat what is known today is that some officers have resigned, as I was told. Your most blessed servant and friend, Santana.!

Promptly, on January 16, the President ordered the formation of a military commission, in accordance with the provisions of article 210 of the Constitution of 1844. The detained soldiers confirmed the participation of the heroine and her nephew Andrés, as well as the Venezuelan citizen José del Carmen Figueroa and Nicolás de Barias, a soldier participating in the Baluarte pronouncement. The decision was, as expected, the sentencing of the four to the death penalty. It can be assumed that the sentence was ordered by Santana, who had special influence in the military establishment. Those who have considered that Bobadilla was truly responsible are guilty of candor. When faced with requests for clemency, Santana simply responded that it was not within his powers to attend to them, an excuse again motivated by his desire to evade responsibilities.

== Trial and Execution ==
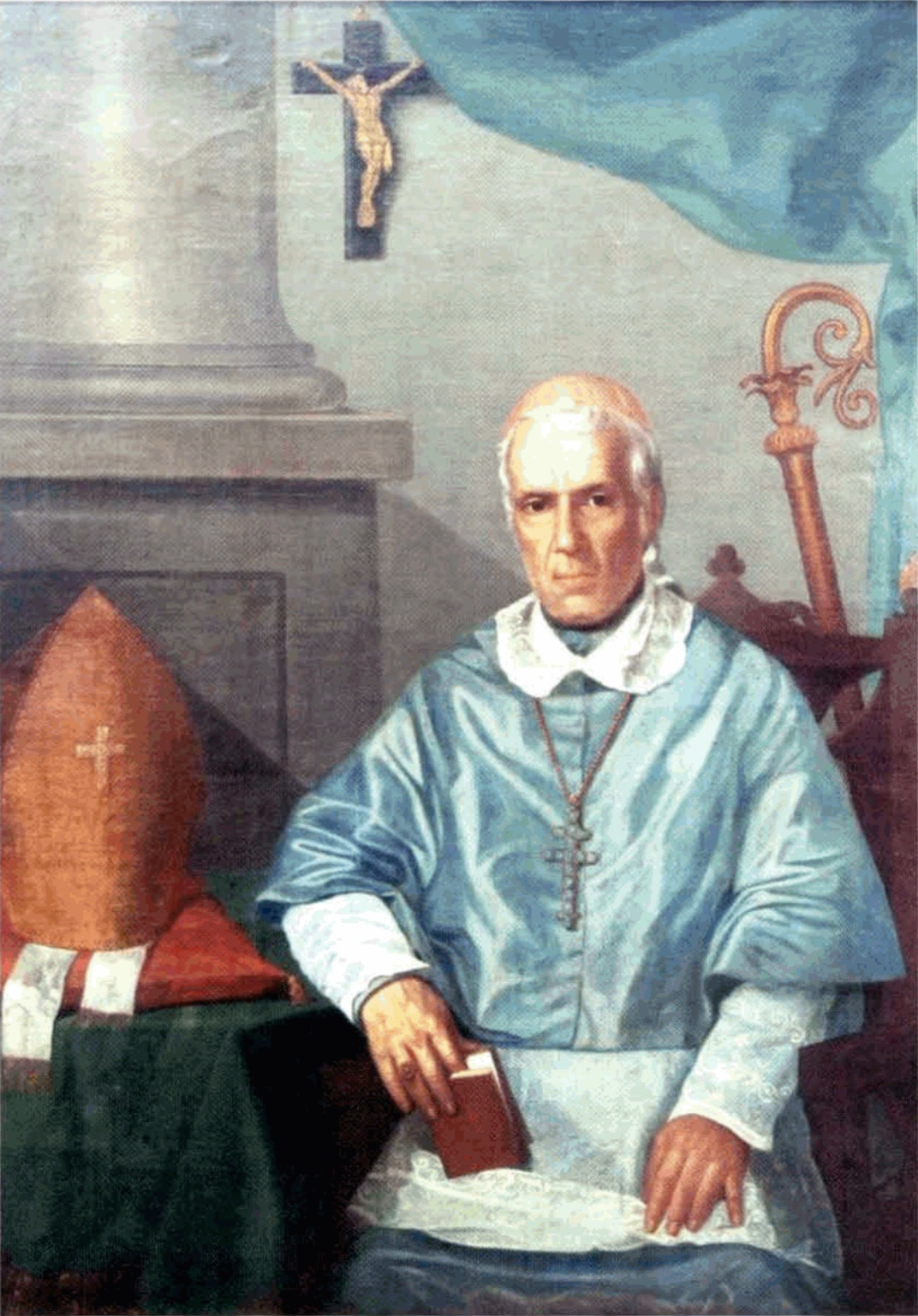
Archbishop Tomás de Portes e Infante, who was a friend of Trinidad Sánchez due to religious ties, accompanied her In her final moments.

The desperation of Santana and his collaborators went so far that, macabrely, they chose February 27 for the execution of the condemned. It was the first anniversary of the still called Separation, an event in which the four had taken part. The selection of the date had a symbolic value, in order to warn that anyone who tried to question the current order would have to face drastic consequences. Unlike what happened in July of the previous year, when Santana did not dare to shoot Duarte and his companions because of the pressure that arose, this time he found no obstacles. Added to this was the unusual fact that the woman with the most conspicuous participation in the previous year's pronouncement was going to be shot, a tribute to the cowardice of Santana and his acolytes. As an expression of the establishment of an autocratic order, the lawyers of the accused, Juan Nepomuceno Tejera and Félix María del Monte, despite having been Trinitarios and friends of Duarte, in the request for clemency submitted to Santana, referred to those arrested in derogatory way, as “miserable automatons”, and they did them a disservice by recognizing the legal validity of the ruling:

Convinced both of the legality of the sentence and of the idiocy, ignorance and innocent intentions of the condemned, we ask Your Excellency that despite the inflexible severity of the Law, the victorious weapons of the Republic are not used in the destruction of their children.

On the night of February 26, hours before the fatal moment, Trinidad Sánchez received a visit from Bobadilla, who, in accordance with family tradition, offered to commute his sentence if he revealed who had truly led the conspiracy. From what is clear from the story full of falsehoods that he gave to his son-in-law Carlos Nouel, the “universal minister” wanted his rival Manuel Jiménes, Minister of War, to be indicted. The response of a heroine could not wait:

You offer me your life in exchange for revealing the names of the main headlines, so you can kill them then. They are more useful to the cause of the Republic than I. I prefer that they be ignored and the sentence given be carried out on me.

At no time did Trinidad Sánchez lose her cool. As a woman of religious convictions, who had turned fifty months earlier, she was concerned only with protecting her modesty, for which purpose she made some underwear. Already in front of the firing squad, she asked her brother to tie her skirts. The path of the condemned, between the fortress and the cemetery outside the walls, was accompanied by a clamor that led the heroine to cover her ears, so as not to hear the sobs and not suffer weakness. She was accompanied by Archbishop Tomás de Portes e Infante, with whom she had a friendship due to their ties to the Church.

The members of the firing squad tried to evade the charge of shooting a woman, so they diverted the first two shots, which prolonged the agony and highlighted a stoic fortitude. Juan Francisco Sánchez captured the heroine's final moments:

Three shocks were fired. Andrés fell in the first. When seeing

Since the shots left her unharmed, she asked her brother Narciso – who was a very good shooter – to execute her. Archbishop Don Tomás de Portes refused this, declaring that he would have accepted, in the case of father and son, but never between two brothers, since this would be equivalent to authoritatively repeating the example of Cain and Abel. Finally, orders were given for the picket to approach;

fire at point blank range, and it had an effect. (In the second volley they injured his hand and his suit caught fire)

== See also ==
- Francisco del Rosario Sánchez, nephew
- Socorro Sánchez del Rosario, niece
- Concepción Bona
- Manuela Díez Jiménez
- Rosa Duarte
- Ana Valverde
- The Villa sisters
- Juana Saltitopa
- Pedro Santana
- Juan Pablo Duarte

== Bibliography ==
- Alfau Durán, Vetilio. Mujeres de la independencia. Santo Domingo, 1999.
- García, José Gabriel. Compendio de la historia de Santo Domingo. 4 vols. Santo Domingo, 1968.
- Lugo Lovatón, Ramón. Sánchez. 2 vols. Ciudad Trujillo, 1947.
- Luperón, Gregorio. Notas autobiográficas y apuntes históricos. 3 vols. Santo Domingo, 1974.
- Rodríguez Demorizi, Emilio. Documentos para la historia de la República Dominicana. 3 vols. Ciudad Trujillo, 1944–1959.
- Rodríguez Demorizi, Emilio. Correspondencia del cónsul de Francia en Santo Domingo, 1844-1846. Ciudad Trujillo, 1944.
