= Ramón Cáceres metro station =

Santo Domingo metro station

Ramón Cáceres

General information
- Location: Santo Domingo; Dominican Republic
- Coordinates: 18°29′34.5″N 69°53′57.5″W
- System: Santo Domingo Metro station
- Line: Line 2

History
- Opened: 1 April 2013

Services
Preceding station	Santo Domingo Metro	Following station
Mauricio Báez toward María Montez	Line 2	Horacio Vásquez toward Concepción Bona
Location

Ramón Cáceres is a Santo Domingo Metro station on Line 2. It was open on 1 April 2013 as part of the inaugural section of Line 2 between María Montez and Eduardo Brito. The station is located between Mauricio Báez and Horacio Vásquez.

This is an underground station built below Expreso V Centenario. It is named in honor of Ramón Cáceres.
