= Horacio Vásquez metro station =

Santo Domingo metro station

Horacio Vásquez
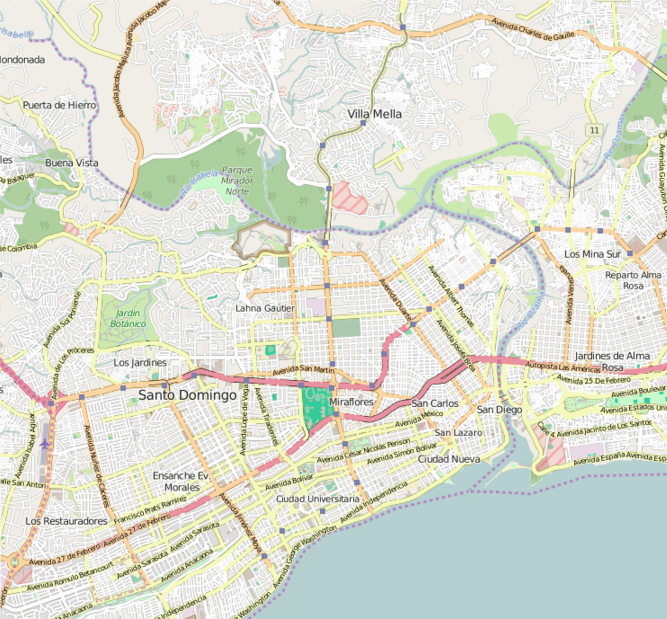
- Map of the Metropolitan Region of Santo Domingo

General information
- Location: Santo Domingo; Dominican Republic
- Coordinates: 18°29′44.6″N 69°53′46.4″W
- System: Santo Domingo Metro station
- Line: Line 2

History
- Opened: 1 April 2013

Services
Preceding station	Santo Domingo Metro	Following station
Ramón Cáceres toward María Montez	Line 2	Manuel de Jesús Galván toward Concepción Bona
Location

Horacio Vásquez is a Santo Domingo Metro station on Line 2. It was open on 1 April 2013 as part of the inaugural section of Line 2 between María Montez and Eduardo Brito. The station is located between Ramón Cáceres and Manuel de Jesús Galván.

This is an underground station built below Expreso V Centenario. It is named in honor of Horacio Vásquez.
