= Ercilia Pepin metro station =

Santo Domingo metro station

Ercilia Pepín

General information
- Location: Santo Domingo; The Dominican Republic
- Coordinates: 18°30′34.9″N 69°52′33.5″W
- System: Santo Domingo Metro station
- Line: Line 2

History
- Opened: 9 August 2018

Services
Preceding station	Santo Domingo Metro	Following station
Eduardo Brito toward María Montez	Line 2	Rosa Duarte toward Concepción Bona
Location

Ercilia Pepín is a Santo Domingo Metro station on Line 2. It was opened on 9 August 2018 as part of the section of Line 2 between Eduardo Brito and Concepción Bona. The station is located between Eduardo Brito and Rosa Duarte.

This is an underground station built below Avenida San Vicente de Paúl. It is named in honor of Ercilia Pepín.
