= María Baltasara de los Reyes =

Dominican heroine and militant (1798–1867)

María Baltasara de los Reyes y Bustamante (January 6, 1798 – 1867) was a Dominican revolutionary who had an important role in the independence movement of the Dominican Republic. She was the first woman to take up arms in the Dominican War of Independence.

== Life ==
María Baltasara de los Reyes y Bustamante, according to Dominican historians, was called María Baltasara because she was born on Three Kings Day, January 6, 1798; and they named her Baltasara after the African king Balthazar. Baltasara was the daughter of Micaela Bustamante, although some information about her birth is unknown.

Baltasara de los Reyes married, on May 2, 1812, Francisco Acosta, a skilled sailor of Portuguese origin, known as El Portugués. The couple had two children: Juan Alejandro Acosta, a military man and marine general of the Dominican Republic who fought in the Dominican War of Independence, and Lucía Acosta.

She was one of the two hundred patriots who were at the Puerta del Conde when independence was proclaimed by the Trinitarios. She hid Juan Pablo Duarte in her house while he was being pursued by the Haitian authorities. Her discretion was so great that not even Duarte's family knew where he was hidden. María Baltasara cunningly decided to hide him in her home because she lived right in front of the Duarte house, and no one would search so close to his house, from there he could see his family daily without them realizing it. The secret was not revealed until after Duarte left for the outside world.

María Baltazara died in 1867 in Higüey, Dominican Republic.

== Historiagraphy ==
During the struggle for Dominican independence, Baltasara de los Reyes displayed great courage and resilience for the cause. Because of this, she became a symbol of revolution in the Dominican Republic. Some of her distinguished acts included:

- She was the only woman who was present at the Angulo Fort on the night of independence.
- She is considered the first sailor and soldier of the Dominican Republic.
- She was always seen on the docks of Santo Domingo with a rifle at hand.
- She was the one who idealized the marine front so that the invading Haitian army did not go beyond Azua and Santiago and did not reach the coasts of the capital.

== See also ==
- Juana Saltitopa
- Rosa Duarte
- Concepción Bona
- Juan Alejandro Acosta
- Petrolina Gaú
