= Lisandro Macarrulla =

Entrepreneurial leader and government minister of the Dominican Republic (born 1956)

Lisandro José Macarrulla

Minister of the Presidency of the Dominican Republic
- Incumbent
- In office 16 August 2020 – 24 July 2022
- President: Luis Abinader
- Preceded by: Gustavo Montalvo

Personal details
- Born: Lisandro José Macarrulla Tavárez; 19 December 1956 (age 69) Santo Domingo Dominican Republic
- Party: Modern Revolutionary Party (PRM)
- Spouse: Lidia María Martínez Cruz
- Children: Lisandro Antonio Macarrulla Martínez Víctor Lisandro Macarrulla Martínez Lisandro José Macarrulla Martínez
- Parents: Lisandro Antonio Macarrulla Reyes (father); Gladys Margarita Tavárez Cabral (mother)
- Relatives: María Lorenza Matilde Villa (great-great-grandmother)
- Education: Rochester Institute of Technology
- Occupation: Businessman
- Cabinet: Presidency of Luis Abinader

Lisandro José Macarulla Tavárez (Santo Domingo, 19 December 1956) is a businessman and entrepreneurial leader from the Dominican Republic.

== Early life, family and education ==
Lisandro José Macarulla Tavárez was born on 19 December 1956 in Santo Domingo within an affluent white Dominican family.

Ancestors of Lisandro Macarrulla

8. Víctor Macarrulla
4. Víctor Lisandro Macarrulla Grullón
9. Victoria Grullón
2. Lisandro Antonio Macarrulla Reyes
20. Francisco Reyes Tavárez (1824–1909)
10. José Francisco Reyes Cabral
21. María del Carmen Cabral Céspedes
5. Aminta Baudilla Reyes Chávez
22. Juan Chávez
11. Aminta Chávez Calderón
23. Seferina Calderón
1. Lisandro José Macarrulla Tavárez (born 1956)
24. Manuel de Jesús Tavárez Reyes (1803–1860)
12. Vicente de la Trinidad Tavárez Portes
25. Altagracia de Portes y Morell de Santa Cruz
6. Arturo Tavárez Saviñón
26. Rafael Saviñón
13. María de la Antigua Saviñón Villa; La Vega, Dominican Republic
27. María Lorenza Matilde Villa del Orbe
3. Gladys Margarita Tavárez Cabral
7. Manuela de Jesús Cabral Ramírez

Macarrulla has a degree in Business management with a Master in Finance/ Service Management from the Rochester Institute of Technology in New York State, United States.

== Business career ==
He presides Grupo MAC, one of Dominican Republic's largest companies, having investments in real estate, tourism and construction.

Macarrulla was president of Industries Association of the Dominican Republic (AIRD), of the Asociación de Industrias de Materiales de Construcción, of the Asociación de Productores de Cemento del Caribe, of the Federación Iberoamericana de Cemento and two-times president of National Council of Private Enterprises (CONEP). As philanthropist he is the head of "Asociación Ciudad Ovando" an NGO that seeks the preservation of historical places in Santo Domingo's Colonial City.

== Grupo MAC ==
El Grupo MAC es un holding de empresas e inversiones multinacionales que dirige Lisandro Macarrulla y sus familiares, las empresas e inversiones pertenecientes an este grupo se encuentran divididas en:

=== MAC Industrias y Puertos ===
- Consorcio VMO compuesto por VMO Industrias y VMO Concretos dedicados a la fabricación y comercialización de materiales de construcción
- DOMICEM: Industria de cemento con presencia en República Dominicana, Haití y Jamaica donde comparte inversiones con Grupo Inicia de la poderosa Familia Vicini y la empresa italiana Colacem.

=== MAC Inmobiliaria ===
- CONDI: Administradora de activos inmobiliarios en República Dominicana y otros países.
- Inversiones Turísticas Sans Souci: Administradora del Puerto Sans Souci y desarrolladora de proyectos inmobiliarios, turísticos, hoteleros y de negocios en la zona de Sans Souci
- MAC CC: Desarrolladora inmobiliaria de propiedades exclusivas en el casco histórico de la Ciudad Colonial de Santo Domingo.

=== MAC Ingeniería ===
- MAC Construcciones: Subsidiaria del Grupo MAC dedicada al desarrollo inmobiliario habitacional con proyectos que incluyen La Nueva Barquita
- River Construction Group Group (RCG): Empresa de desarrollo inmobiliario público y privado.
- Internacional de Servicios Marítimos: Empresa dedicada an ofrecer servicios marítimos diversos en todo el Caribe

=== MAC Puertos y Logística ===
- Sans Souci Ports: Puerto privado multipropósito y el principal puerto de la ciudad de Santo Domingo.
- Marina & Yacht Club: Marina y puerto deportivo ubicada en Santo Domingo
- Fast Auto Logistics: Empresa de logística marítima.

=== MAC Turismo ===
- Milan Worldwide: Empresa propietaria de Hotel Hodelpa Nicolás de Ovando, Hotel Casa Real y Hotel Novus Plaza en la Ciudad Colonial de Santo Domingo.
