= Eduardo Brito =

Dominican opera singer

- Born: Eleuterio Brito; January 22, 1906; Puerto Plata, Dominican Republic
- Origin: Dominican Republic
- Died: January 5, 1946 (aged 39) Santo Domingo, Dominican Republic
- Genres: Opera, Zarzuela, Merengue, Waltz, Bolero
- Occupation: Singer
- Instrument: Baritone voice

Eduardo Brito (January 22, 1906 – January 5, 1946) was a Dominican baritone singer. He was world-renowned for his voice and took to the stage in many countries performing operas and zarzuelas. The main hall of the Dominican National Theater is named after Brito.

== Early years ==
Brito was born Eleuterio Brito in Puerto Plata, Dominican Republic. He came from a poor family and during his childhood he worked as a shoe-shiner and a candyman. As a young adult, his musical gifts became apparent and Brito in 1926 became acquainted with Julio Alberto Hernández, who helped mold Brito into the great baritone singer that he is remembered as.

== Musical career ==
Brito's first encounter with the Dominican media was in 1927, where he sang at a banquet in honor of several key political figures of the time. By 1928 he was married to Rosa Elena Bobadilla, a vedette, and touring with "Los Internacionales" in Haiti, Puerto Rico and Curaçao. In 1929, Brito along with band members from a new group called "Grupo Dominicano," headed to New York City to record with the famous Eduardo Vigil y Robles. While in New York, Brito along with his wife performed at the Waldorf Astoria, RKO theaters and Loew's State Theater, alongside Eduardo Casino the father of the famous Rita Hayworth.

In 1932, Brito and his wife were part of a company that was organized by Eliseo Grenet, which toured Spain. This was the beginning of Brito's international acclaim that would carry him to perform in the greatest venues of many countries.

== Legacy ==
The main hall of the Dominican National Theateris named after Brito. A metro station in Santo Domingo on Line 2 is named after Brito, and is between the Ercilia Pepín metro station and that dedicated to Manuel de Jesus Abreau Galvan.
