= Trina de Moya de Vasquez metro station =

Santo Domingo metro station

Trina de Moya de Vasquez

General information
- Location: Santo Domingo; The Dominican Republic
- Coordinates: 18°30′34.7″N 69°51′46.9″W
- System: Santo Domingo Metro station
- Line: Line 2

History
- Opened: 9 August 2018

Services
Preceding station	Santo Domingo Metro	Following station
Rosa Duarte toward María Montez	Line 2	Concepción Bona Terminus
Location

Trina de Moya de Vasquez is a Santo Domingo Metro station on Line 2. It was open on 9 August 2018 as part of the section of Line 2 between Eduardo Brito and Concepción Bona. The station is located between Rosa Duarte and Concepción Bona.

This is an underground station built below Avenida San Vicente de Paúl. It is named in honor of Trina de Moya de Vasquez.
