= Hurricane Debby (2000) =

Category 1 Atlantic hurricane in 2000

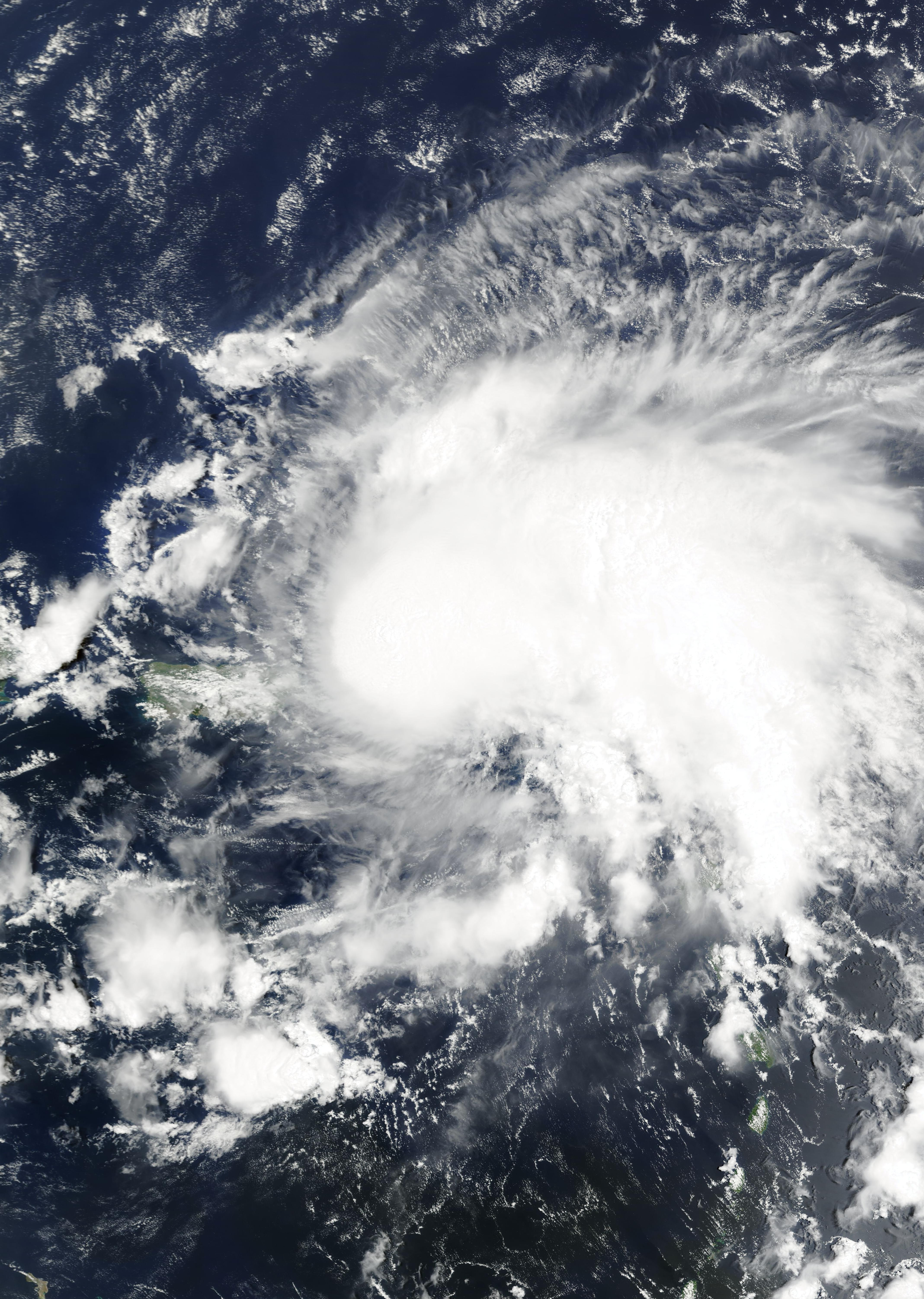
- Debby near peak intensity near the Leeward Islands on August 22

Meteorological history
- Formed: August 19, 2000
- Dissipated: August 24, 2000

Category 1 hurricane
- 1-minute sustained (SSHWS/NWS)
- Highest winds: 85 mph (140 km/h)
- Lowest pressure: 991 mbar (hPa); 29.26 inHg

Overall effects
- Fatalities: 1 indirect
- Damage: $735,000 (2000 USD)
- Areas affected: Lesser Antilles, Puerto Rico, Hispaniola, Turks and Caicos Islands, Cuba, Jamaica
- IBTrACS
- Part of the 2000 Atlantic hurricane season

Hurricane Debby caused minor damage in the Greater and Lesser Antilles in August 2000. The seventh tropical cyclone, fourth named storm, and second hurricane of the annual season, Debby developed from a tropical wave east of the Lesser Antilles on August 19. Favorable conditions allowed the depression to become Tropical Storm Debby early on August 20, and further strengthening into a hurricane occurred 24 hours later. Sustained winds peaked at 85 mph (137 km/h) on August 21. Debby made three landfalls on August 22, in Barbuda, Saint Barthélemy, and Virgin Gorda, before re-entering the Atlantic north of Puerto Rico. As Debby moved parallel to the north coast of Hispaniola late on August 23, it weakened back to a tropical storm. The storm tracked westward and weakened further, instead of approaching Florida and strengthening into a major hurricane. (Note: A major hurricane is a storm that ranks as Category 3 or higher on the Saffir–Simpson Hurricane Scale.) While south of eastern Cuba on August 24, Debby was downgraded to a tropical depression, six hours before completely dissipating.

Light rainfall and gusty winds caused minor damage in Barbuda, Saint Martin, and Trinidad and Tobago. In the United States Virgin Islands, brief blackouts and damage reaching $200,000 (2000 USD) (Note: All damage figures are in 2000 USD, unless otherwise noted) was reported. Effects were most severe in Puerto Rico, where isolated locations experienced more than 12 inches (300 mm) of rainfall. The heavy precipitation resulted in mudslides and flooding, which in turn damaged roads, bridges, and houses. At least 406 homes on the island were flooded, five of which suffered moderate to severe damage. Additionally, there were many car accidents in San Juan due to slick roads. One indirectly fatality was reported after a man fell off his roof while attempting to remove a satellite dish. Damage on the island of Puerto Rico reached $501,000. In Dominican Republic, the Civil Defense Force reported that severe flooding in the northern portions of that country caused the evacuation of more than 700 people. Overall, the storm caused roughly $35,000 in damage across the island. Impact was lesser in Haiti, where squalls tore tin roofs off of numerous shanty homes and subsequently flooded a few. Additionally, rainfall in Cuba brought relief to an 8 month long drought impacting the region.

== Meteorological history ==
Map plotting the storm's track and intensity, according to the Saffir–Simpson scale Map key Saffir–Simpson scale Tropical depression (≤38 mph, ≤62 km/h) Tropical storm (39–73 mph, 63–118 km/h) Category 1 (74–95 mph, 119–153 km/h) Category 2 (96–110 mph, 154–177 km/h) Category 3 (111–129 mph, 178–208 km/h) Category 4 (130–156 mph, 209–251 km/h) Category 5 (≥157 mph, ≥252 km/h) Unknown Storm type Tropical cyclone Subtropical cyclone Extratropical cyclone, remnant low, tropical disturbance, or monsoon depression

A strong tropical wave emerged into the Atlantic Ocean from the west coast of Africa on August 16. By the following day, an area of low pressure was noted near 10°N 30°W. However, Dvorak classifications were not initiated due to insignificant convective banding. At 0000 UTC on August 18, the National Hurricane Center's Tropical Analysis and Forecast Branch (TAFB) indicated a low-level circulation, though the system was still considered "too weak to classify". The TAFB released an initial classification later that day at 1145 UTC. Convective banding had increased, though the system as a whole was poorly organized. It then began to gradually organize while moving westward at approximately 17 mph (27 km/h). By late on August 19, convection had consolidated around a well-defined center of circulation. As a result, it is estimated that Tropical Depression Seven developed at 1800 UTC, while located about 1,035 miles (1,666 km) east of the Windward Islands. In the initial advisory by the National Hurricane Center, the agency noted a large area of convection, weak vertical wind shear, warm sea surface temperatures (SSTs), all of which produced a favorable environment for intensification.

The depression strengthened and became Tropical Storm Debby at 0000 UTC on August 20. Operationally, it was not upgraded to a tropical storm until 15 hours later. After classification, the center of circulation was difficult to locate due to the re-organization of convection. Although the circulation remained relatively disorganized, the central dense overcast (CDO) associated with Debby was large, symmetrical, and had cold cloud tops. By 0600 UTC on August 21, Debby had strengthened into a Category 1 hurricane. Despite reconnaissance aircraft flight reports of sustained winds ranging from 92 to 101 mph (148 to 163 km/h), Debby was not upgraded to a hurricane. Six hours later, the storm reached its maximum sustained wind speed of 85 mph (137 km/h). Additionally, Debby attained its minimum barometric pressure of 991 mbar (29.3 inHg) early on August 22. It was operationally not upgraded to a hurricane until 0900 UTC on August 22, due to a poorly defined circulation. Hurricane-force winds were very concentrated, extending only 25 miles (40 km) from the storm's center of circulation.

Hurricane Debby over the Leeward Islands on August 22

At 0600 UTC on August 22, Debby made landfall in Barbuda with winds of 75 mph (121 km/h). A few hours later, the storm also struck Saint Barthélemy at the same intensity. It made a third landfall in Virgin Gorda with winds of 75 mph (121 km/h), at 1500 UTC on August 22. In an advisory issued later that day, the National Hurricane Center noted that although the agency anticipated further strengthening, it would not be "significant" in the short-term, due to Debby's rapid movement west-northwestward and potential land interaction with Hispaniola. Late on August 22, the storm passed about 35 miles (56 km) north of Puerto Rico. Early on August 23, computer models varied extensively with the Geophysical Fluid Dynamics Laboratory (GDFL) model, regarded by the National Hurricane Center as an "extreme outlier", depicting a 926 mbar (27.3 inHg) low pressure area over the Florida Keys on August 26. Due to increasing southwesterly wind shear, Debby began to weaken and was downgraded to a tropical storm at 1200 UTC on August 23, while situated north of Dominican Republic.

Beginning late on August 23, it was predicted that Debby would re-strengthen, as SSTs were between 84 and 86 °F (29 and 30 °C) and the storm was anticipated to resume the original west-northwest movement, reducing land interaction. However, Debby curved westward and continued to become increasingly disorganized, with the low-level circulation being displaced well west of the main, deep convective area. Early on August 24, the storm entered the Windward Passage and began passing south of Cuba. The National Hurricane Center continued to predict re-intensification, but noted the potential for degeneration into a tropical wave during the next few days in its advisory at 0900 UTC on August 24, due to persistent wind shear. Three hours later, Debby was downgraded to a tropical depression. The storm degenerated into a tropical wave at 1800 UTC on August 24, while located south of Cuba.

== Preparations ==
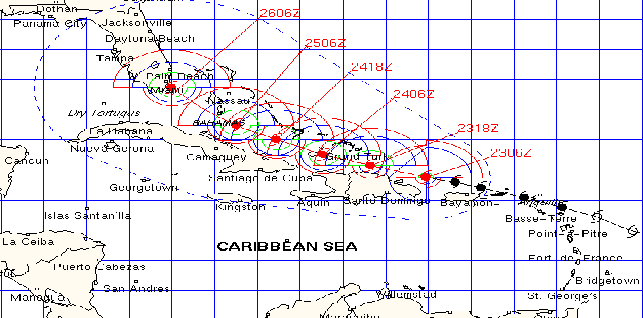
A forecast map of Hurricane Debby, projecting its landfall in Florida

Several storm warnings were issued for the Greater and Lesser Antilles to warn residents of the approaching storm. In Philipsburg, Sint Maarten, several shops in the downtown area were boarded up to prepare for Debby's approach. Elsewhere along the range of the cyclone's predicted path, homes and businesses were boarded up, and families buried emergency supplies in the ground. Ten United States Navy ships and two submarines off the Coast of Vieques Island temporarily abandoned training exercises and moved over 300 miles (480 km) to the south of Puerto Rico, out of the storm predicted path. On Antigua, electricity was shut off to prevent storm damage to the island's infrastructure. When the hurricane moved into the coastal waters of the U.S. Virgin Islands, the Hovensa oil refinery in St. Croix was shut down, and as a result gas prices rose.

Around 7,000 people in Cuba were evacuated to avoid the oncoming hurricane. Several shelters were opened by the Montserrat Red Cross on Montserrat, but few people sought refuge in them. Over 40 shelters were ready for use in Nassau, Bahamas, even though Debby never affected the island. A total of 889 people in the northern coastal plains were evacuated and placed in shelters out of Debby path. Three shelters were opened for the coming of Debby in Saint Thomas, and another two in Saint John. The total number of people in all five shelters only reached 64. An additional 17 people took refuge in an unknown number of shelters on St. Croix.

In addition, many tropical cyclone warnings and watches were posted in the Greater and Lesser Antilles. At 2100 UTC on August 20, a hurricane watch was issued for Sint Maarten, Saba, and Sint Eustatius, while there was a tropical storm watch for Antigua, Barbuda, and Anguilla. Early on August 21, the hurricane watch was expanded to include the United States Virgin Islands and Puerto Rico. Additionally, the tropical storm watch was extended out to the British Virgin Islands, Guadeloupe, Montserrat, Saint Barthélemy, Saint Kitts and Nevis, and Saint Martin. A hurricane warning was issued for Guadeloupe, Puerto Rico, and the Virgin Islands late on August 21. In Dominica, both a tropical storm warning and a hurricane watch were reported, while a tropical storm watch was put into effect in Dominican Republic. At 0300 UTC on August 22, a hurricane watch was issued for Haiti north of Port-au-Prince as was a tropical storm warning in Dominican Republic from Palenque to Cabrera. An hour later, a tropical storm watch was put into effect for the southeastern Bahamas and Turks and Caicos Islands. By 0900 UTC on August 22, Dominican Republic's entire north coast was under a hurricane warning. Additionally, the tropical storm watch for the southeastern Bahamas and Turks and Caicos Islands was upgraded to a hurricane watch.

The hurricane warning for Antigua, Barbuda, Guadeloupe, Montserrat, and St. Kitts and Nevis was discontinued at 1200 UTC on August 22, as was the tropical storm warning for Dominica. Three hours later, a hurricane warning was issued for the southeastern Bahamas and Turks and Caicos Islands, and another hurricane watch was posted for the central Bahamas. Additionally, the hurricane warning for Saba, Sint Eustatius, Sint Maarten, was discontinued. At 2100 UTC on August 22, a hurricane watch was issued in Cuba for the provinces of Holguín and Las Tunas, while a tropical storm warning was issued for Haiti north of Port-au-Prince. The hurricane warning for the United States Virgin Islands and Puerto Rico was lowered to a tropical storm warning, before being canceled early on August 23. Additionally, all watches and warning east of the United States Virgin Islands were discontinued. On August 23, a hurricane warning was issued for the central Bahamas and Cuba in the provinces of Guantanamo, Holguín, and Las Tunas. A hurricane watch was put into effect for the northwestern Bahamas and Cuba in Camagüey and Ciego de Ávila on the north coast and Santiago de Cuba and Granma on the south coast. By 1500 UTC on August 25, all of the remaining tropical cyclone watches and warnings were cancelled.

Although the hurricane was still situated far from Florida, a state of emergency was declared for the Florida Keys. Non-residents in Monroe County were forced to leave, causing a significant reduction in the tourism for the year 2000. For a period of time, forecasters predicted Debby to approach the Florida Keys as a Category 2 hurricane, while the GDFL predicted a much more intense Debby near the Florida Keys as a Category 4 hurricane with a minimum central pressure of 926 mbar (27.3 inHg).

== Impact ==
Because of the relatively weak and disorganized nature of the storm, impact throughout its path was widespread, but not particularly severe. Puerto Rico bore the brunt of the storm, followed by the United States Virgin Islands, then the Dominican Republic. Debby was attributed to about $735,000 in damage and 1 indirect fatality, which occurred in Puerto Rico when a man fell off a roof while attempting to remove a satellite dish.

=== Lesser Antilles ===
Tropical Storm Debby interacting with the high and rugged mountains of Hispaniola on August 23

Throughout the Leeward Islands, gusty winds damaged fruit trees and downed power lines. Wind gusts estimated to have reached 65 mph (105 km/h) lashed Anguilla. Some trees were destroyed, and electrical poles and power lines were downed. In Antigua, downed utility poles and trees were spotted. Precipitation totals in Antigua peaked at 0.91 inches (23 mm). Rainfall on the island of Barbuda reached 1.5 inches (38 mm). Debby caused moderate roof damage to several structures and destroyed a few sheds and fruit trees. Sint Maarten reported little rainfall as the storm almost uneventfully passed over the island, causing mostly minor flooding and vegetation damage. Losses reached $750,000, though it was entirely from cruise ship cancellations and closed businesses. With damage nearly nonexistent, the Sint Maarten Tourism Bureau remarked that Debby "was the weakest hurricane St. Maarten experienced in several years."

On Saint Barthélemy, wind gusts as strong as 87 mph (140 km/h) at Gustavia were reported. Wind damage was minor, limited to some downed trees and power poles. Rainfall totals were very light, ranging from 0.59 to 0.98 inches (15 to 25 mm). Tides on the island reached about 13 feet (4.0 m) above normal. Similar wave heights were reported on Saint Martin, while precipitation was slightly higher, ranging from 0.78 to 1.37 inches (20 to 35 mm). Impact was minimal on Guadeloupe. Wave heights reached approximately 10 feet (3.0 m). Rainfall was also light on Guadeloupe, with 1.45 inches (37 mm) in Le Moule, 1.22 inches (31 mm) in Sainte-Rose, 1.07 inches (27 mm) in La Désirade, 0.66 inches (17 mm) in Sainte-Anne, and 0.66 inches (17 mm) in Pointe-à-Pitre. Feeder bands from Debby affected countries as far south as Trinidad and Tobago, where heavy rainfall resulted in flooding in the Barrackpore region.

=== United States territories ===
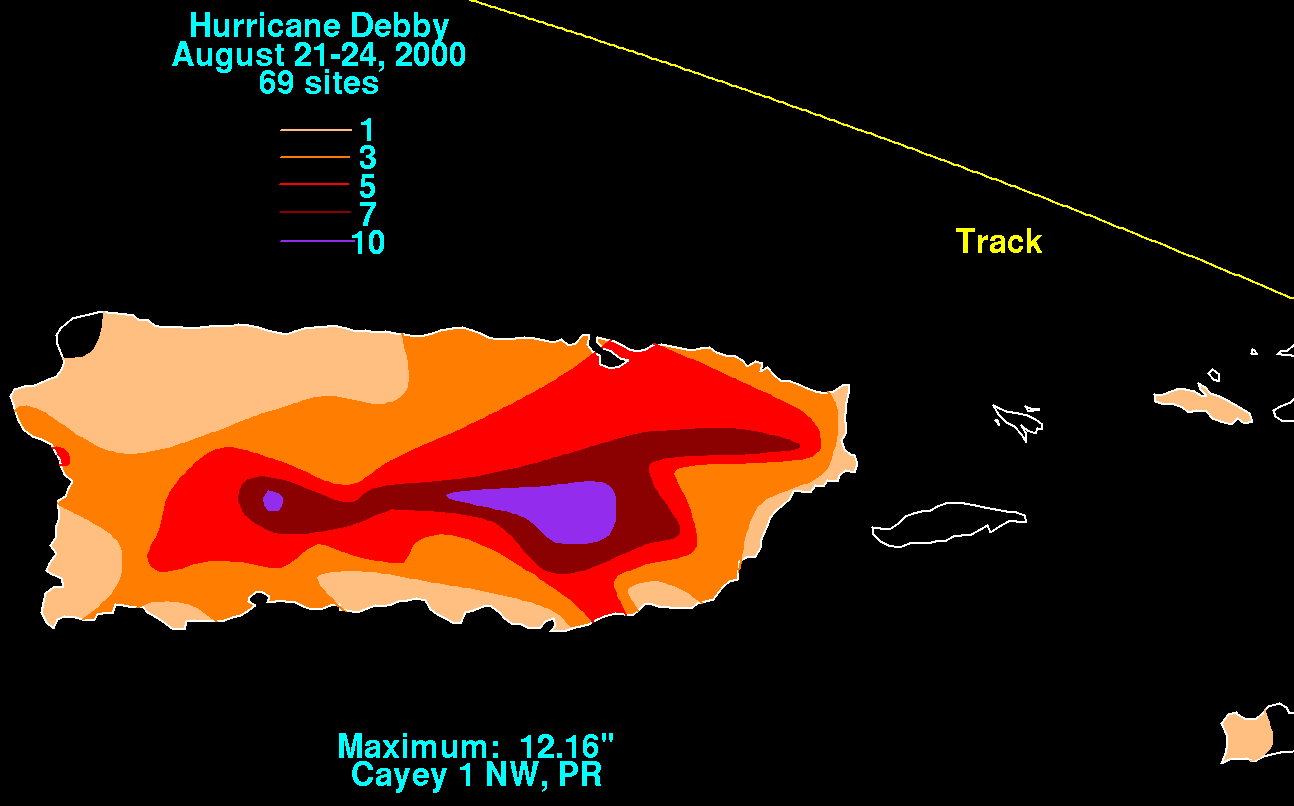
Rainfall from Hurricane Debby in Puerto Rico and the U.S. Virgin Islands

In the United States Virgin Islands, losses reached approximately $200,000. On Saint Thomas, 1.93 inches (49 mm) of rain was recorded. At the Cyril E. King Airport, sustained winds reached 33 mph (53 km/h), while gusts up to 45 mph (72 km/h) were reported. Elsewhere on Saint Thomas, one sailboat was washed ashore on Vessup Beach. Sustained winds of 35 mph (56 km/h) and gusts of 43 mph (69 km/h) on Saint Croix caused brief power outages. Additionally, 0.46 inches (12 mm) of rain fell in St. Croix. Minor landscape damage occurred on Saint John.

Debby also dropped up to 12 inches (300 mm) of rainfall across Puerto Rico in less than 48 hours, causing mudslides and damage to bridges and roads; however, most of the island territory only received 3 inches (76 mm) of precipitation. The maximum rainfall on the island was 12.63 inches (321 mm) in Río Piedras, Puerto Rico. Additionally, 12.16 inches (309 mm) of precipitation was recorded near Cayey, though there were unofficial reports of 17 inches (430 mm) in the interior mountains of the region. The hurricane dropped around 5 inches (130 mm) of rain in San Juan, producing slick roads that resulted in several minor car accidents. There were 406 homes affected from the flooding, 5 of which were moderately to severely damaged. Losses in Puerto Rico reached $501,000, primarily in the Caguas municipality. The storm was also indirectly responsible for the death of a 78-year-old man who fell while trying to remove a satellite dish from the roof of his home.

=== Dominican Republic ===
On the northern coast of the Dominican Republic, waves and rainfall caused light to moderate damage. Storm surge damaged about 20 homes and dozens of families were evacuated from Cabrera, Nagua, Río San Juan, and Samaná. In Nagua, several districts were left without drinking water and electricity after gusts blew down power cables and large trees. At San José de Matanzas, several coconut trees were uprooted from the ground. Also, two houses were slightly damaged from wind gusts. In the nearby town of La Vega, bridges over the Piedra River and Jumunucu River collapsed due to the heavy rainfall and flooding. In southern Puerto Plata, flooding in Aguas Negras, Playa Oeste and Dubeau districts forced dozens of families to leave their houses. In Monte Cristi, heavy rainfall caused flooding in various low-lying districts, with over 200 people affected in the coastal portion of the province. Another town, Salcedo, lost approximately 23 sq mi (60 km^{2}) of bananas, with the damage estimated to have reached approximately $35,000 (RD$500,000 DOP). The country's Civil Defense Force stated that over 700 people on the northern coast were forced out of their homes after severe flooding. A wedding was also delayed at the Bavaro beach resort after flooding left the altar area suitable only for ducks.

=== Haiti ===
Residents living in shanties in northern Haiti fled their homes during the storm. In Port-de-Paix, strong winds tore off many tin roofs and flooded some homes. A small coastal village, Carenage, experienced high winds that sunk at least five boats. Storm surge also swept away one home, but without any reports of injury or death. In Cuba, the remnants of Debby brought rainfall to the eastern portion of the country, particularly Guantánamo Province, with 24‑hour precipitation totals of 3.22 inches (82 mm) in San Antonio del Sur, 2.55 inches (65 mm) in Maisí, and 2.28 and 2.16 inches (58 and 55 mm) at separate locations in Guantánamo. Due to a severe eight-month drought in Guantanamo Province, the accumulated rainfall was largely beneficial. However, as a precaution against potential flooding, more than 32,000 people and thousands of cattle residing in low-lying areas were evacuated to higher ground. A few locations reported gusty winds. At Maisí, sustained winds between 29 and 31 mph (47 and 50 km/h) were reported, along with gusts up to 42 mph (68 km/h). Additionally, tides caused coastal flooding in Baracoa.

== See also ==
- Other storms of the same name
- Timeline of the 2000 Atlantic hurricane season
