= San José de Matanzas =

Coordinates: 19.35412°N 69.82957°W

- Interactive map of San José de Matanzas
- Country: Dominican Republic
- Province: María Trinidad Sánchez

Population (2008)
  - Total: 3 489

San José de Matanzas (also known as Matancitas) is a town in the María Trinidad Sánchez province of the Dominican Republic.

== Sources ==
- – World-Gazetteer.com
