= Juana Saltitopa =

Dominican revolutionary and activist (1815–1860)

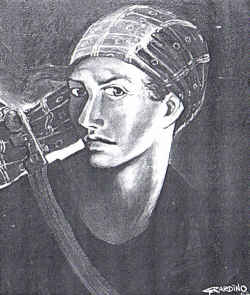
- Juana Saltitopa c. 1850
- Born: 1815; Jamao, La Vega, Dominican Republic
- Died: February 6, 1860 (aged 44–45); Punal, La Vega, Dominican Republic
- Cause of death: Assassination
- Other name: La Coronela ("The Colonel")
- Military career
- Allegiance: Dominican Republic
- Branch: Dominican Army: Liberation Army
- Service years: 1844–1860
- Rank: Colonel
- Nickname: La Coronela
- Conflicts: Dominican War of Independence

Juana Saltitopa (1815 – February 6, 1860), also known as La Coronela (The Female Colonel), was a Dominican activist and member of the Dominican Army. She played an important role in the Dominican War of Independence, specifically in the Battle of Santiago on March 30, 1844. Her exact birthdate is unknown as is her death.

Having liberal and independent character, Juana decided to participate in the conflicts for the independence of the Dominican Republic. She worked as a "water girl" transporting water for the needs of the Dominican forces and to refresh the cannons. She also took on the duties of a nurse, attending the Dominican combatants. Her attitude and valor won her the name "La Coronela" (The Female Colonel).

According to Juan Esteban Aybar, a soldier in the war and restructuring of Independence of the Dominican Republic, Juana was seen in Santo Domingo in 1852 earning pay as a Colonel working for the government. Later, President Pedro Santana, already in power, fired her and sent her back to Cibao. She was mysteriously assassinated on February 6, 1860.

== Origin of her name ==
Juana Saltitopa was born in 1815 in the town Jamao, near the province La Vega. Unlike her sister, Mercedes, Juana was a very extroverted and energized woman that liked to climb trees and jump branch to branch. That earned her the nickname "Saltitopa". She was known as a person that was rude with her gestures and actions.

== Role in the Dominican War of Independence ==
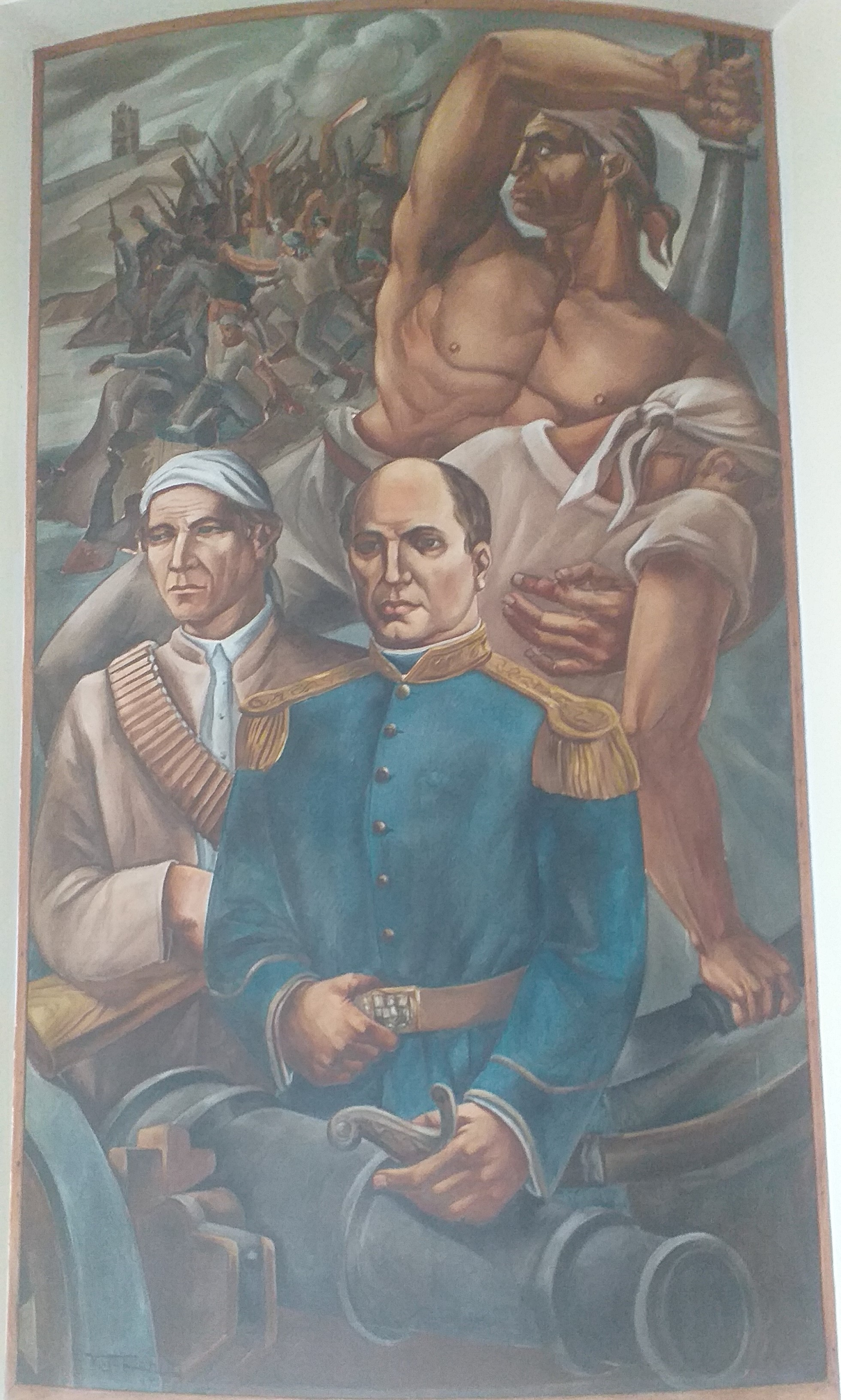
Work by José Vela Zanetti inside the Monument to the Heroes of the Restoration in Santiago, Dominican Republic.

Saltitopa resided in the city of Santiago when the First Dominican Republic was founded in 1844. She was described as woman with a strong and independent temperament. The war preparations to confront Haitian forces who were preparing to invade the former Spanish part, which was previously annexed to Haiti in 1822 by Jean-Pierre Boyer, had the effect of inspiring her, joining the defense of said city. Once the Dominican troops arrived in La Vega, among which there were people from her native place led by a relative of hers, Marcos Trinidad, Juana went to the barracks to participate in the fight against the Haitians. The Battle of March 30 began in Santiago, she dedicated herself to encouraging his compatriots so that their spirits would not decline. When the cannons ran dry, she would go to the river to look for water, a gesture that kept the troop's morale high. Her great courage earned her the nickname La Coronela from her colleagues. Her heroism spread by word of mouth throughout all the regions of the country, alluding to him in popular verses. Apparently, the surname Saltitopa never existed in the Dominican Republic, although her sister Mercedes de ella used it. It was more of a personal nickname that came to symbolize the masculine and quarrelsome woman. In Santiago and La Vega she was accompanied by two women as if they were her aide-de-camp and she carried a small machete as a weapon. Once the independence wars were over, her activities focused on her private life. Juan Esteban Aybar, a native of San Cristóbal, wrote in his memoirs (partially published by Despradel Batista):

“…the death that a life-long woman gave to a Haitian colonel, whose name was Merced and by bad nickname (to) Md. Sartaitopa, I met her previously in Santiago because she was from there, and in 1952 I saw her in Santo Domingo, earning a colonel's salary, from the Government, but later Santana, due to his laxity, deprived her of her salary and employment and sent her another trip to Cibao,…”

She was almost always around, both in La Vega and in Santiago, accompanied by two women: Juana Colón, from Santiago, and Petronila Suárez.

== Testimony of Bríjida Minaya ==
In an article published in "El Progreso", in La Vega, Dr. Jovino A. Espínola reproduced the testimony of Bríjida Minaya (Mamá Billa) (in Despradel Batista):

Yes; Juana at that time was a braver woman than many men; I will tell you that at a party they had at "La Jina Mocha", I witnessed Juana slap Bartolo Pérez on the floor, because he tried to abuse her by throwing his arm around her shoulder and pulling her. braid. I must also tell you that in Santiago she fought a lot against the dark French [Haitians]; In those fights, Juana drove forward the men who were cowering, she tended to the wounded, she gave water to the combatants to quench their thirst and cool the cannons, she brought gunpowder in his apron or handkerchief to the artillerymen and sang songs to the soldiers so that they would always be happy and brave. I remember seeing her have a small right sword, he used it on the side [pointing to me from the right shoulder to the left side]. Listen, [she told me], Juana was from Jamo, she stayed here in the town and could be my mother, I was very young then, she was about thirty years old and she couldn't take her good Madras scarf off her head.

== Death ==
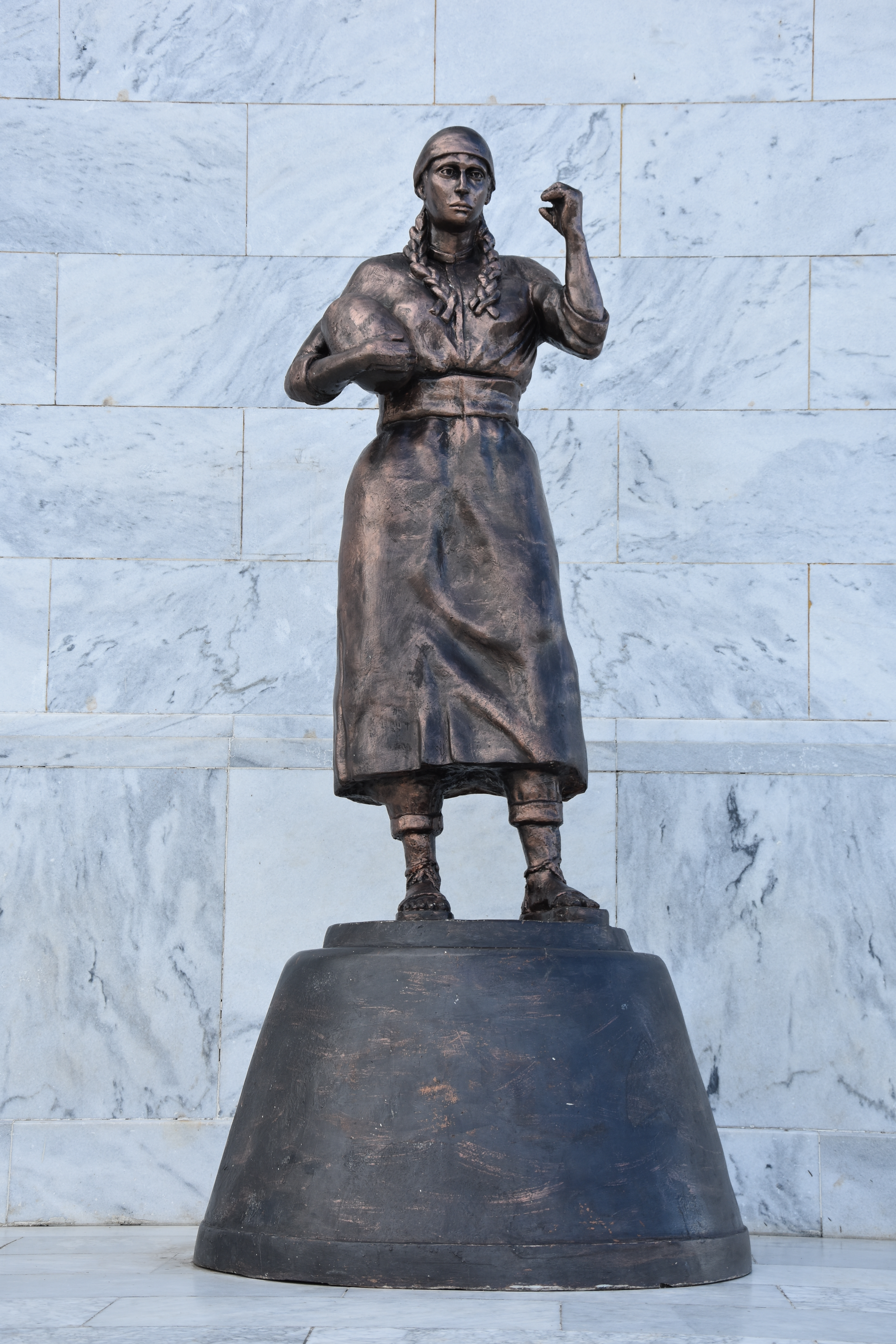
Equestrian Statue of Saltitopa in the Monumento a Los Héroes de la Restauración in Santiago, Dominican Republic.

On February 6, 1860, Saltitopa was murdered while returning from her hometown of Jamao. The attack took place between Nibaje and Marilópez, near Santiago de los Caballeros, a city where she had settled and famously participated in the Battle of Santiago in 1844.

Juana Saltitopa left as a legacy to the Dominican Republic a flame of female heroism and her example, embodied in the battles for the independence of her country.

== See also ==
- Dominican War of Independence
- Battle of Santiago
- José María Imbert
- Ana Valverde
- María Trinidad Sánchez
- Concepción Bona
