= National Pantheon of the Dominican Republic =

Jesuit church in the Dominican Republic

- Interior of the Pantheon

- Location in Dominican Republic
- 18°28′30″N 69°52′59″W
- Location: Santo Domingo, Dominican Republic

History
- Built: 1714–1746

Site notes
- Architect: Geronimo Quezada y Garçon
- Architectural style: Neoclassic-renaissance
- Restored: 1956
- Restored by: Javier Borroso

The National Pantheon was built from 1714 to 1746 by the Spaniard Gerónimo Quezada y Garçon and was originally a Jesuit church. The structure was constructed in the neoclassic-renaissance style. Today, the structure stands as a national symbol of the Dominican Republic and serves as the final resting place of the Republic's most honored citizens.

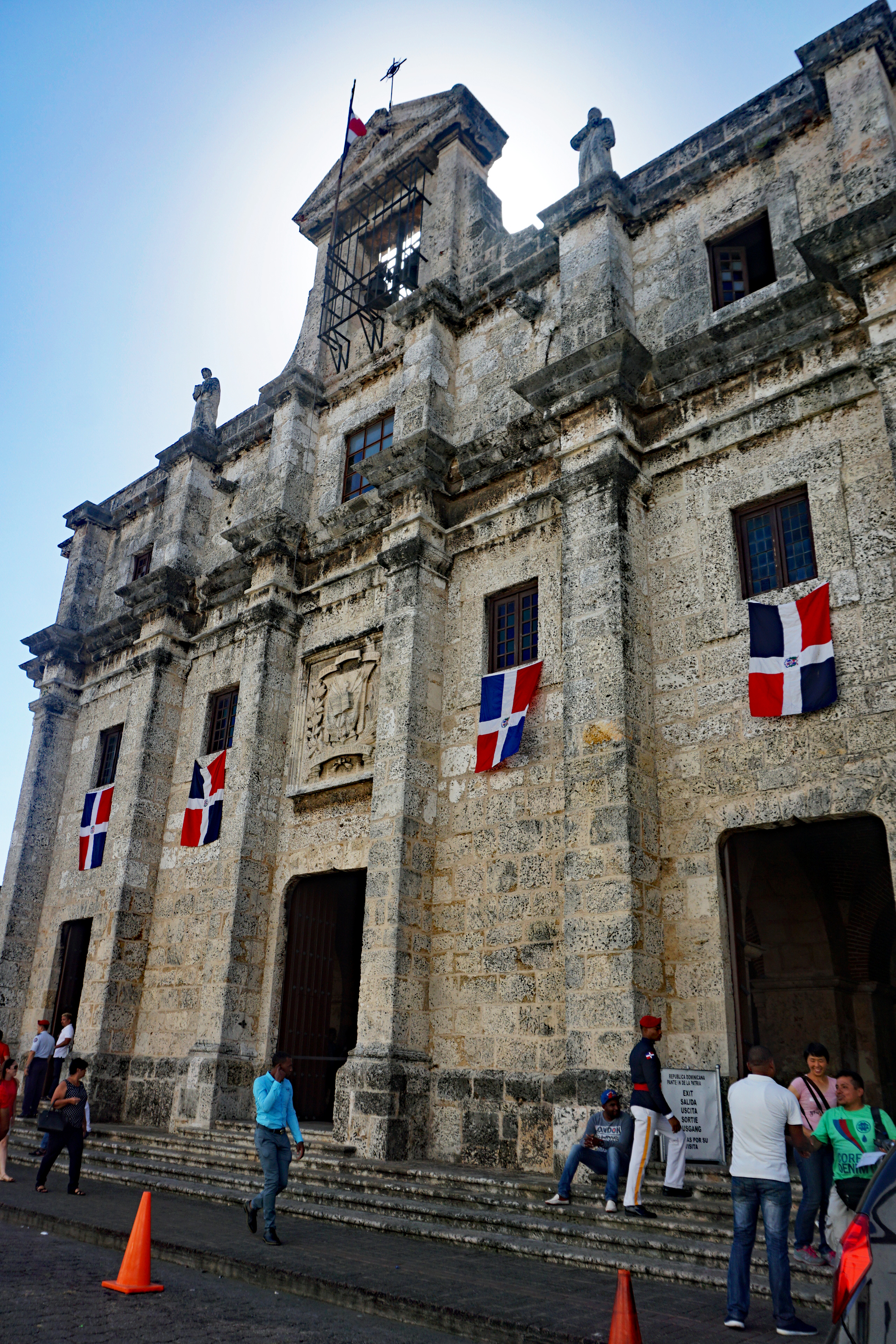
Entrance of the pantheon

== History ==
Jesuits said Mass and held other liturgies in the structure until 1767, when it was made a tobacco warehouse. It became the first Dominican theater for purely artistic purposes under the society Amantes de las Letras in 1860 until 1878 when it became theater La Republicana which operated until 1917. It housed governmental offices until 1956.

In 1956, Spanish architect Javier Borroso renovated the structure to serve its new purpose as a national mausoleum, by order of then-dictator Rafael Trujillo. Originally, Trujillo envisioned being interred at the National Pantheon, yet today it is the place where the country's most famous persons are honored, among others Trujillo's assassins.

== Notable people buried ==
- Francisco Gregorio Billini – was a Dominican writer, pedagogue, and politician of Italian origin.
- Concepción Bona – A nursery school teacher who took part in designing the Dominican Republic flag
- Pedro Francisco Bonó – An Italian-French Dominican who was a politician, sociologist and intellectual
- Francisco Caamaño – Dominican soldier and politician who took presidency of the Dominican Republic during the Civil War of 1965.
- Juan Bautista Cambiaso – was an Italian-born explorer, admiral and sailor in the Dominican Navy.
- Antonio Duvergé – was a Dominican general of French origin who served in the Dominican War of Independence.
- Ulises Francisco Espaillat – was a Dominican author and president.
- Fabio Fiallo – was a Dominican writer, poet, politician, and diplomat
- José María Cabral – was a Dominican military figure and politician. He served as the first Supreme Chief of the Dominican Republic
- Jose Gabriel García – was a Dominican military, historian, politician, journalist and publisher.
- Francisco Henríquez y Carvajal – was a doctor, lawyer, writer, educator and president of the Dominican Republic,
- Pedro Henríquez Ureña – was a Dominican essayist, philosopher, humanist, philologist and literary critic.
- Gregorio Luperón – was a Dominican military general and President.
- Eugenio María de Hostos – Puerto Rican educator, philosopher, lawyer, novelist, and Puerto Rican independence advocate.
- José Núñez de Cáceres – Dominican politician and writer. He is known for being the only president of the Republic of Spanish Haiti
- Emilio Prud'Homme – French-Dominican who is known for having authored the lyrics of the Dominican national anthem.
- Gaspar Polanco – was a Dominican military general and politician.
- Juan Sánchez Ramírez – was a Dominican soldier who served as the Captain general of the modern Dominican Republic.
- José Rufino Reyes y Siancas – was a Dominican composer, known for having created the music of the Dominican national anthem.
- Benigno Filomeno de Rojas – He served as the Head of State of the Dominican Republic and President
- Pedro Santana – was a Dominican military general, President and 1st Marquess of Las Carreras.
- Socorro Sánchez del Rosario – a Dominican educator and journalist. She was the first feminist journalist of the country.
- María Trinidad Sánchez – was a Dominican freedom fighter and a heroine of the Dominican War of Independence.
- Salomé Ureña – was a Dominican poet and an early proponent of women's higher education

== See also ==
- List of Jesuit sites
