= Manuel de Jesús Galván metro station =

Santo Domingo metro station

Manuel de Jesús Galván

General information
- Location: Santo Domingo; Dominican Republic
- Coordinates: 18°29′59.1″N 69°53′23.5″W
- System: Santo Domingo Metro station
- Line: Line 2

History
- Opened: 1 April 2013

Services
Preceding station	Santo Domingo Metro	Following station
Horacio Vásquez toward María Montez	Line 2	Eduardo Brito toward Concepción Bona
Location

Manuel de Jesús Galván is a Santo Domingo Metro station on Line 2. It was open on 1 April 2013 as part of the inaugural section of Line 2 between María Montez and Eduardo Brito. The station is located between Horacio Vásquez and Eduardo Brito.

This is an underground station built below Expreso V Centenario. It is named in honor of Manuel de Jesús Galván.
