= Socorro Sánchez del Rosario =

Dominican educator and journalist (1830–1899)

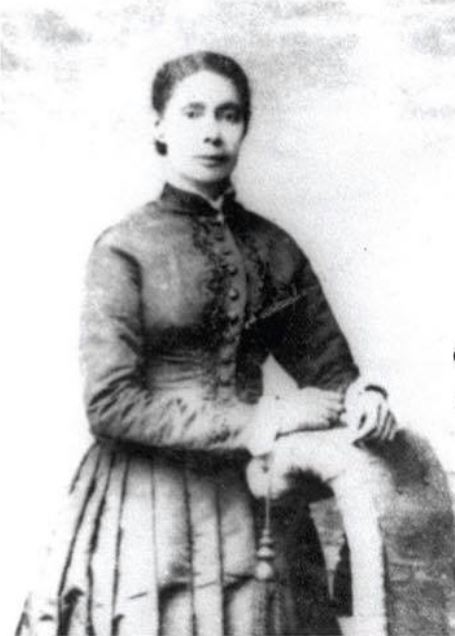
- Sanchez, ca. 1870–1880
- Born: María del Socorro Sánchez del Rosario; 15 August 1830; Santo Domingo, Captaincy General of Santo Domingo (now Santo Domingo, Dominican Republic)
- Died: 26 March 1899 (aged 68); Santo Domingo, Dominican Republic
- Other name: Socorro Sánchez
- Occupations: educator and journalist
- Relatives: María Trinidad Sánchez (aunt); Francisco del Rosario Sánchez (brother)

Socorro Sánchez del Rosario (15 August 1830 – 26 March 1899) was a Dominican educator and journalist. She was the first feminist journalist of the country. She also founded the first secular coeducational school in the Dominican Republic, as well as the first women's library, first women's normal school and first women's pharmacy training courses. There are several schools in the country which have been named after her.

== Early life ==
María del Socorro Sánchez del Rosario was born on 15 August 1830 on the island of Hispaniola, in Santo Domingo, which at the time was part of the Republic of Haiti, to María Olaya del Rosario de Belén and Narciso Sánchez Ramona. Her father descended of slaves and her mother was a free woman of color, descended of European and African ancestors. Her father's sister María Trinidad Sánchez, was executed for her participation as a freedom fighter in the Dominican War of Independence. Her mother was a hairdresser and made combs, while her father worked in the meat trade, selling, butchering and raising cattle. Sánchez was one of eleven siblings: Francisco (1817–1861); (Note: Francisco was born in 1817, and was baptized as Francisco del Rosario. When his parents married in 1819 he was legitimized, but kept his surname del Rosario.) Tomás (1819–1878), Eugenio (1822–1889); Manuel de Jesús (1823–?); María de la Cruz (1824–?); Juan Francisco (1826–1845); Jacinto (1827–1900); Pablo Marcial (1829–?); Ana (1832–?); and Idelfonso (1834–1897). Francisco is recognized as one of the co-founding fathers of the Dominican Republic.

== Career ==
Sánchez was raised in a nationalist family which was critical of the Haitian regime which ruled the country from 1822 to 1844 and the Spanish annexation of the country which lasted from 1861 to 1865. She was strongly influenced by her aunt Trinidad and her commitment to the independence of the Dominican Republic. Another influence was Madame Roland a writer and leading figure of the French Revolution. Sánchez began writing and publishing her views, both openly and using the pseudonym Rosa Cruz. As the first feminist journalist in the country, she publicly exposed the corruption of the authorities, and was described as behaving like a man for her outspokenness. In addition to her nationalist position, Sánchez wrote articles advocating for women's education and employment. She wrote for various newspapers, including El Dominicano, El Telégrafo, and El Telegrama, all major publications in the country.

After her brother Francisco's execution for opposing President Pedro Santana's invitation for Spain to recolonize the country, Sánchez was exiled to St. Thomas at the time part of the Danish West Indies, but for which Spain had tendered an offer to acquire. After her return in 1863 to Santo Domingo, she spent a year in jail for expressing her anti-government sentiments. Among the issues deemed objectionable by the authorities were her statements advocating for Dominican sovereignty, free speech, and women's education.

Sánchez began her career as a teacher, providing instruction in Cibao and Santo Domingo. By 1870, Sánchez was living in Santiago de los Caballeros and that year established the first co-educational and secular school, Colegio Sagrado Corazón de María (Sacred Heart of Maria College), in the country. Her students, from the upper-class of the city, paid tuition, but she waived the fees for those who were unable to pay. Among the women who graduated from this school were Eugenia Dechamps, Matilde Grullón, Rita Infante, Clementina Jiménez, Altagracia Perelló, and Justina Perelló. A member of the 27 February Women's Club, she took active part in literary salons and established the first women's library in the country located at 50 Calle Sol, in 1876, in Santiago.

Moving back to the capital, in 1881, Sánchez founded the Colegio La Altagracia (High Grace College) in Santo Domingo, which would become the Escuela Superior de Señoritas (Superior School for Ladies) and graduated the first female secondary students in the country. The following year, she created a curricula for women to train as pharmacists at the school. The first licensed school teacher in the country Dolores Rodríguez de Objío (1883) and the first women pharmacists (1887) in the country graduated from this school.

== Death and legacy ==
Sánchez died on 26 March 1899 in Santo Domingo. Her obituary published in Listín Diario was not flattering, calling her "manly" and adding that Sánchez was known for "su apostolado en la enseñanza pública, en la agitada intromisión de sus energías en la vida política del país y en el audaz empeño que puso siempre por distinguirse entre sus conciudadanos" [her ministry in public education, in the agitated meddling of her energies in the political life of the country, and in the bold effort she always put into distinguishing herself from her fellow citizens]. She was initially buried in the Capilla de los Inmortales (Chapel of the Immortals) in the Basilica Cathedral of Santa María la Menor, but her remains were relocated in 1974 to the Panteón Nacional (National Pantheon).

A street in the Gascue neighborhood of Santo Domingo that was named in her honor had been renamed by the 1920s. In 2002, the Escuela Básica Socorro Sánchez (Socorro Sánchez Primary School) began operating in a rented facility in Los Alcarrizos. In 2016, a new facility for the institution was opened. In 2015, a school with the same name was established in Villa Altagracia.
