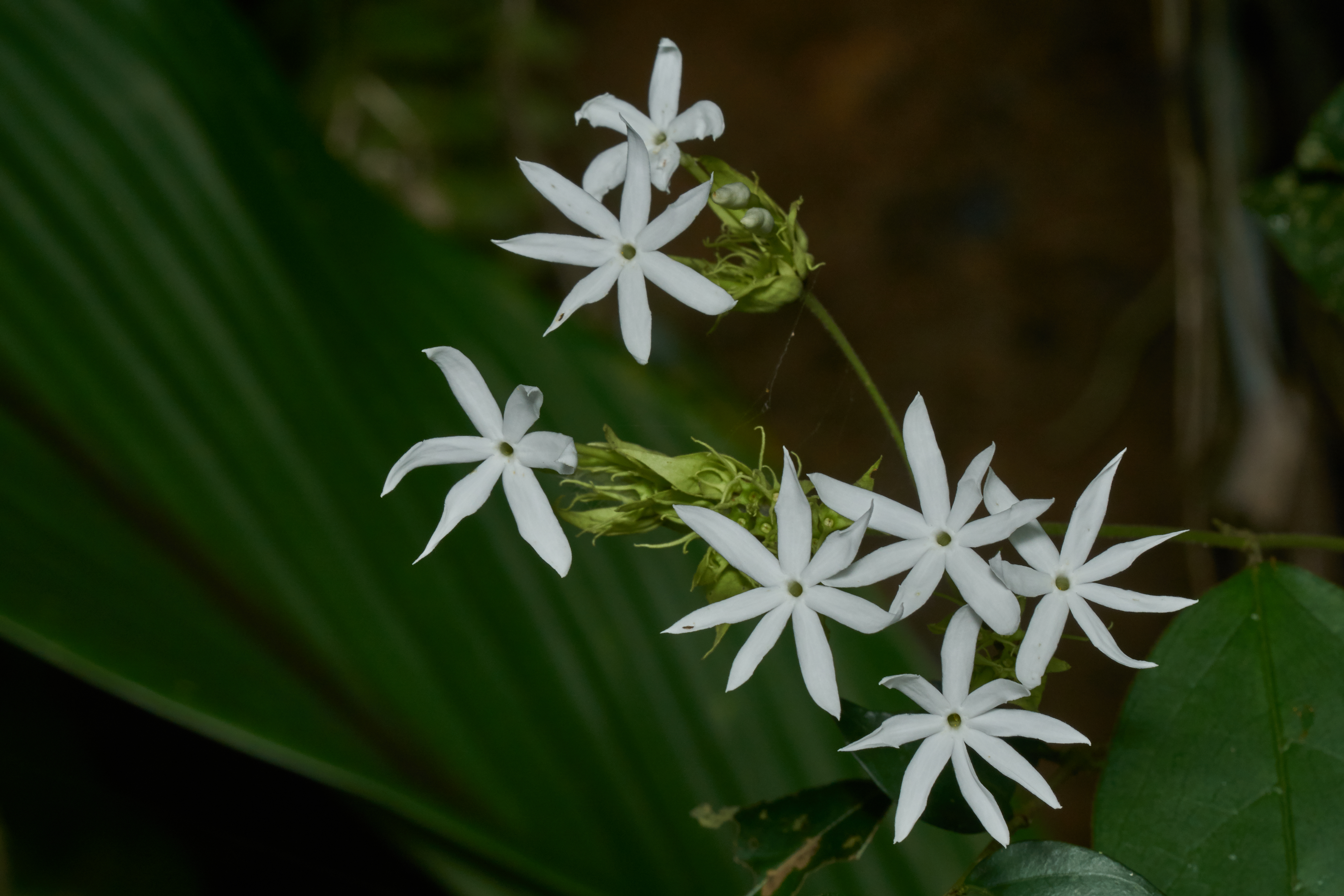

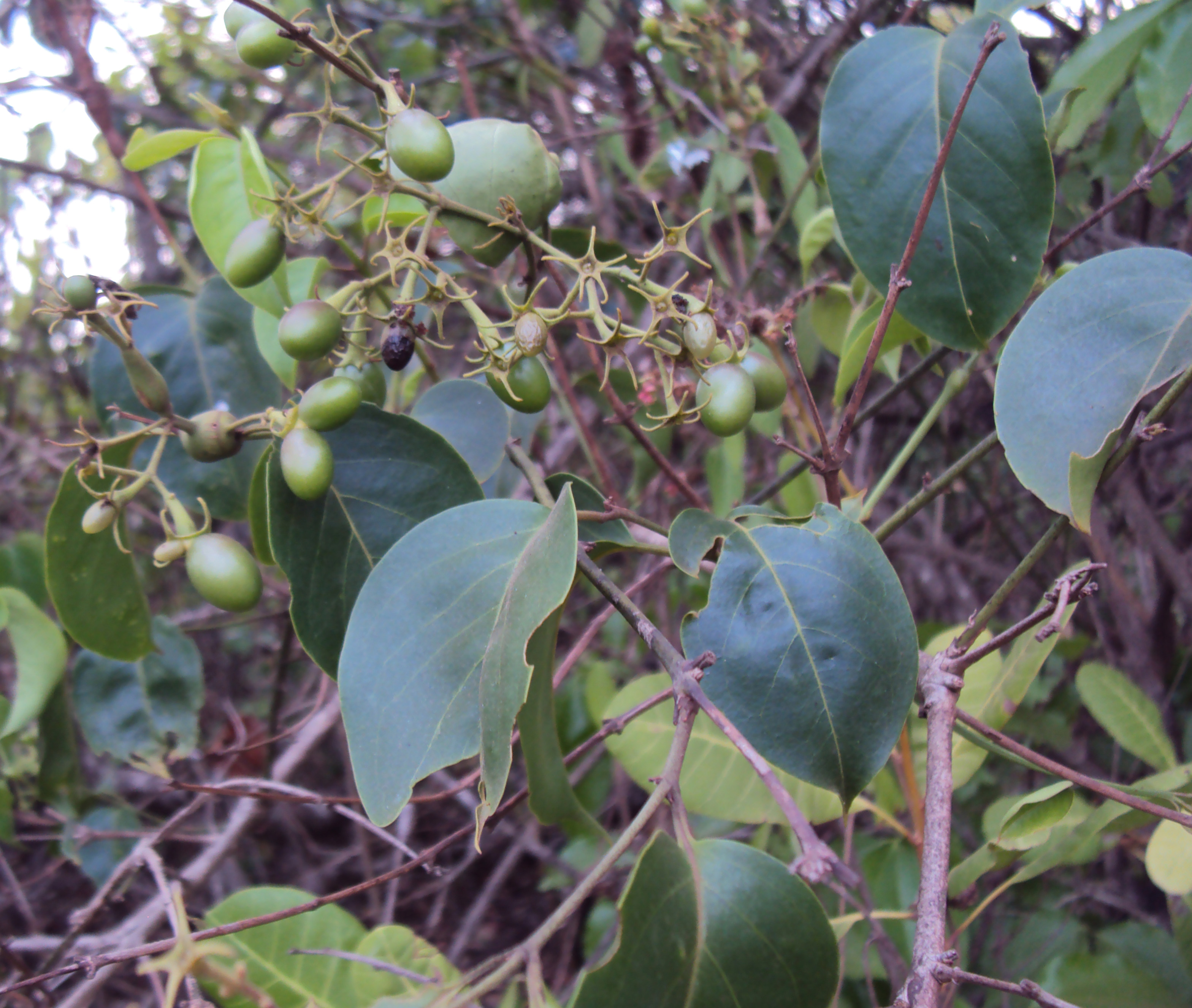

Scientific classification
- Kingdom: Plantae
- Clade: Tracheophytes
- Clade: Angiosperms
- Clade: Eudicots
- Clade: Asterids
- Order: Lamiales
- Family: Oleaceae
- Genus: Jasminum
- Species: J. malabaricum

Binomial name
- Jasminum malabaricum Wight

= Jasminum malabaricum =

Species of jasmine

Jasminum malabaricum, the Malabar jasmine or wild jasmine, is a species of flowering plant in the family Oleaceae, native to southern parts of India, and Sri Lanka.

== Etymology ==
'Jasminum' is a Latinized form of the Persian word, 'yasemin' for sweetly scented plants.

== Common names ==
- English: Malabar jasmine, wild jasmine
- Malayalam: കദംബവള്ളി kadambavalli
- Marathi: कुसर kusar, रान मोगरा ran mogra
- Sinhala: Pichcha
- Tamil: கொடிவகை kotivakai
- Kannada: Kadu mallige
- Sanskrit: मुद्गर mudgara
