= Concepción Bona =

Dominican activist and teacher (1824–1901)

Maria de la Concepción Bona Hernández
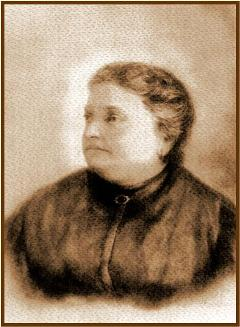
- Portrait of Concepción Bona, possibly in her later years.
- Born: María de la Concepción Bona y Hernández; December 6, 1824; Santo Domingo, Dominican Republic
- Died: July 2, 1901 (aged 76); Santo Domingo, Dominican Republic
- Resting place: National Pantheon of the Dominican Republic
- Monuments: Concepción Bona metro station
- Occupation: Professor
- Spouse: Marcos Gómez Carvajal
- Children: Eloísa, Marcos Antonio, José María, Manuel and Rafael María
- Parents: Ignacio Bona Pérez (father); Juana de Dios Hernández (mother)

Maria de la Concepción Bona Hernández, Mother Founder (December 6, 1824 – July 2, 1901) was a nursery school teacher and a campaigner for the independence of the Dominican Republic. Together with María Trinidad Sánchez, Isabel Sosa and María de Jesús Pina, she took part in designing the Dominican flag.

== Birth and childhood ==
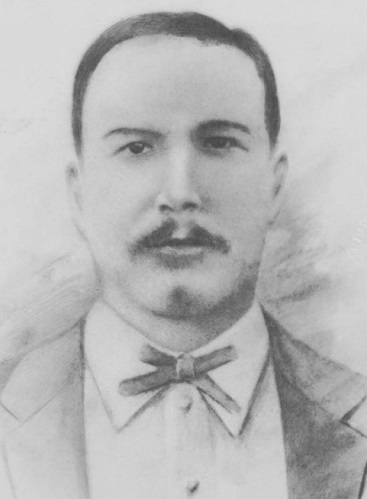
Pedro Alejandro Piña, co-founder of the revolutionary movement, La Trinitaria, was a cousin of Bona.

Concepción Bona was born in Santo Domingo on 6 December 1824. From a young age, she showed love for the country and kept up to date with all independence events at all times. Her early years and youth were spent in a house located on Palo Hincado Street, almost on the corner of El Conde, a street that appears in the history of Santo Domingo as the place where most of the independence movements were incubated.

She was a daughter of Ignacio Bona Pérez, one of the signatories of the Manifesto of January 16, 1844, and Juana de Dios Hernández, who was the eldest daughter of Josefa Brea Hernández, wife of the independence leader, Matías Ramón Mella. She was also niece of a famous citizen Juan Pina, the father of Pedro Alejandro Pina, who was prominent in the national independence movement and co-founder of the La Trinitaria secret society.

The Haitian occupation of Santo Domingo began two years before her birth, and she grew up under Haitian rule. When Jean-Pierre Boyer took possession of the Dominican territory in 1822, the result was a political and cultural clash between the two countries, since the cultural base of the Haitians was Franco-African, while that of the Dominican people was Hispanic. For this reason the country was placed under military repression under Jérôme-Maximilien Borgella, who set about recruiting youths for the military service of the Dominican Republic.

== Heroine for Dominican independence ==
Bona grew up in a family fully committed to the patriotic cause that followed the ideas of Juan Pablo Duarte. Young and brave, with her family she unconditionally adopted the Trinitarian ideas. Thus it was that together with her cousin, María de Jesús Pina, Isabel Sosa and María Trinidad Sánchez, using fine fabrics she made the tricolor flag that was hoisted by the independence supporters in Puerta del Conde on February 27, 1844. This marked the birth of the independent Dominican Republic. According to Dominican historians, it was Bona herself who brought the flag to Francisco del Rosario Sánchez, who would fly the flag above the altar following the capture of the Ozama Fortress. Concepción Bona was aged 19 at the time and her cousin was 16.

== Personal life and death ==
Bona married Marcos Gómez y Carvajal, who was from Baní, on June 2, 1851. The couple had six children: Marcos Antonio, Manuel de Jesús, Eloísa, Rafael María, José María, and another José María. Concepción Bona died on July 2, 1901, in Santo Domingo. She was 76 years old. Her remains are preserved in the National Pantheon.

A metro station in Santo Domingo is named after her.

== See also ==
- Dominican War of Independence
- Juana Saltitopa
- María Trinidad Sánchez
- Villa sisters
- Juan Pablo Duarte
- Matías Ramón Mella
- Francisco del Rosario Sánchez
