= Ana Valverde =

Dominican activist and militant (1798–1864)

Ana Valverde (1798 – November 20, 1864) was a militant from what is now the Dominican Republic who participated in the 1844 Dominican War of Independence against Haiti and, later, in the Dominican Restoration War against Spain. For her loyalty to the revolutionary leader Juan Pablo Duarte and his ideals, she was deported, along with other members of her family.

== Family life ==
Valverde was born in 1798 in Santiago de los Caballeros, but she grew up in Santo Domingo. She was the daughter of José Valverde, a lawyer for the Real Audiencia of Hispaniola, and Dolores Fernández. Her brother, Manuel María Valverde, shared her revolutionary political views, and he became a hero of the Dominican Restoration War, which pushed Spain off the island and re-established the country as a republic.

Valverde never married or had children, dedicating herself entirely to the fight for independence. She was aunt of President José Desiderio Valverde and first cousin-twice removed of Father Antonio Sánchez-Valverde.

== Revolutionary activities ==
She worked manufacturing cartridges and bullets in the workshop set up at the Ravelo family home, alongside the Duarte sisters, especially Rosa; Froilana Febles; and the sisters Petronila and Altagracia Abreu y Delgado. These munitions were used in the fight for independence from Haiti and Spain in 1844 and 1863, respectively.

After the 1844 war broke out, Valverde took up a collection among women she knew to fund repairs to the protective wall in Santo Domingo. She also worked to recruit other women to the cause of independence and incited protests.

== Exile ==
When Pedro Santana took power later in 1844, Valverde and her brother were temporarily exiled to Puerto Rico.

She died in Santo Domingo in 1864. She left no photos, drawings or any other record of her physical appearance. A street is named in her honor in Santo Domingo's Villa Consuelo neighborhood.

== Recognitions ==
Ana Valverde Street begins in Josefa Brea, in the Social Improvement neighborhood and ends in Carlos Nouel, in Villa Consuelo.

== See also ==
- Filomena Gómez de Cova
- Rosa Duarte
