= Villa sisters =

Dominican independence activists

The Villa sisters, also known as the Villa del Orbe sisters, (Note: In this Spanish name, the first or paternal surname is Villa and the second or maternal family name is Del Orbe.) were the Dominican sisters who stand out in Dominican history for conceiving the first flag of the Dominican Republic. In addition to the flag, which flew throughout the Cibao region, they were known for having hosted Juan Pablo Duarte in their residence when he visited La Vega at the end of June 1844.

They were the issue of Juan Ramón Villa Jáquez (1781–1843), (Note: The son of Manuel Francisco Villa (a rich Spanish colonist) and María del Carmen Jáquez (of French descent), Juan Ramón Villa Jáquez was mayor of La Vega in 1811 and 1813, a royal standard-bearer and a commandant during the colonial era, and an officer during the Haitian domination.) and his wife María de la Antigua del Orbe Bocanegra. (Note: She was an illegitimate daughter of Capt. José del Orbe and Josefa Bocanegra. Her father was a wealthy cattleman and mayor of La Vega in 1779.) Juan Ramón Villa was a prominent person in the vegan community. He held different functions, including ordinary mayor, alderman, royal lieutenant, captain of militias, Acting Commander of Arms in the colonial era and Civil State Officer during the years of Haitian domination.

Juan Ramón Villa was the son of Manuel Francisco Villa, who was stationed in La Vega in the colonial era before the Treaty of Basel as butler of the “Las Benditas” brotherhood. According to family tradition, he was “a Spanish citizen who was coming to a certain place in America and who on the journey was forced to change course due to the threat of shipwreck.” His wife was María del Carmen Jáquez. The Villa sisters' maternal grandparents were Joseph del Orbe (died 1796), “Captain of her Majesty” and Ordinary Mayor of La Vega in 1779, and Josefa Bocanegra.

== Villa siblings ==
Name	Gender	Birthdate	Took part?
María del Carmen Villa del Orbe	female	c. 1805	Yes
Manuel Francisco Villa del Orbe	male	25 December 1811	No
María Francisca Angustia Villa del Orbe	female	8 April 1814	Yes
Manuela Estefanía Villa del Orbe	female	22 April 1816	Yes
María Lorenza Matilde Villa del Orbe	female	21 November 1818	No
María Filomena Villa del Orbe	female	5 January 1820	No

Source: Hoy/Instituto Dominicano de Genealogía
