= Eduardo Brito metro station =

Santo Domingo metro station

Eduardo Brito
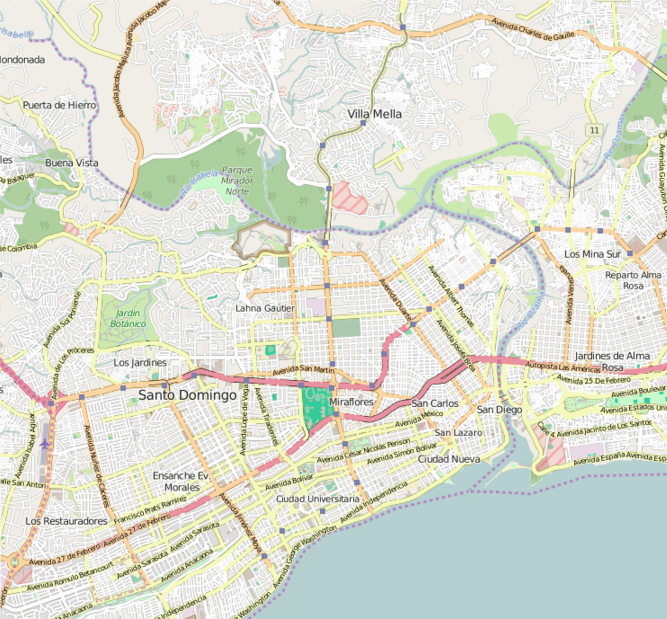
- Map of the Santo Domingo Metropolitan Region.

General information
- Location: Santo Domingo; Dominican Republic
- Coordinates: 18°30′13.3″N 69°53′03.2″W
- System: Santo Domingo Metro station
- Line: Line 2

History
- Opened: 1 April 2013

Services
Preceding station	Santo Domingo Metro	Following station
Manuel de Jesús Galván toward María Montez	Line 2	Ercilia Pepin toward Concepción Bona
Location

Eduardo Brito is a Santo Domingo Metro station on Line 2. It was open on 1 April 2013 as the eastern terminus of the inaugural section of Line 2 between María Montez and Eduardo Brito. On 9 August 2018 the line was extended further east to Concepción Bona. The station is located between Manuel de Jesús Galván and Ercilia Pepin.

This is an underground station built below Expreso V Centenario. It is named in honor of Eduardo Brito.
