= Concepción Bona metro station =

Santo Domingo metro station

Concepción Bona

General information
- Location: Santo Domingo; The Dominican Republic
- Coordinates: 18°30′18.8″N 69°51′27.8″W
- System: Santo Domingo Metro station
- Line: Line 2

History
- Opened: 9 August 2018

Services
Preceding station	Santo Domingo Metro	Following station
Trina de Moya de Vasquez toward María Montez	Line 2	Terminus
Future services
Preceding station	Santo Domingo Metro	Following station
Trina de Moya de Vasquez toward María Montez	Line 2	Manoguayabo toward Los Alcarrizos
Location

Concepción Bona is a Santo Domingo Metro station on Line 2. It was open on 9 August 2018 as part of the section of Line 2 between Eduardo Brito and Concepción Bona. It is currently the eastern terminus of the line. The adjacent station is Trina de Moya de Vasquez.

This is an underground station built below Avenida San Vicente de Paúl. It is named in honor of Concepción Bona.
