= Battle of Santiago (1844) =

1844 battle of the Dominican War of Independence

- Part of the Dominican War of Independence
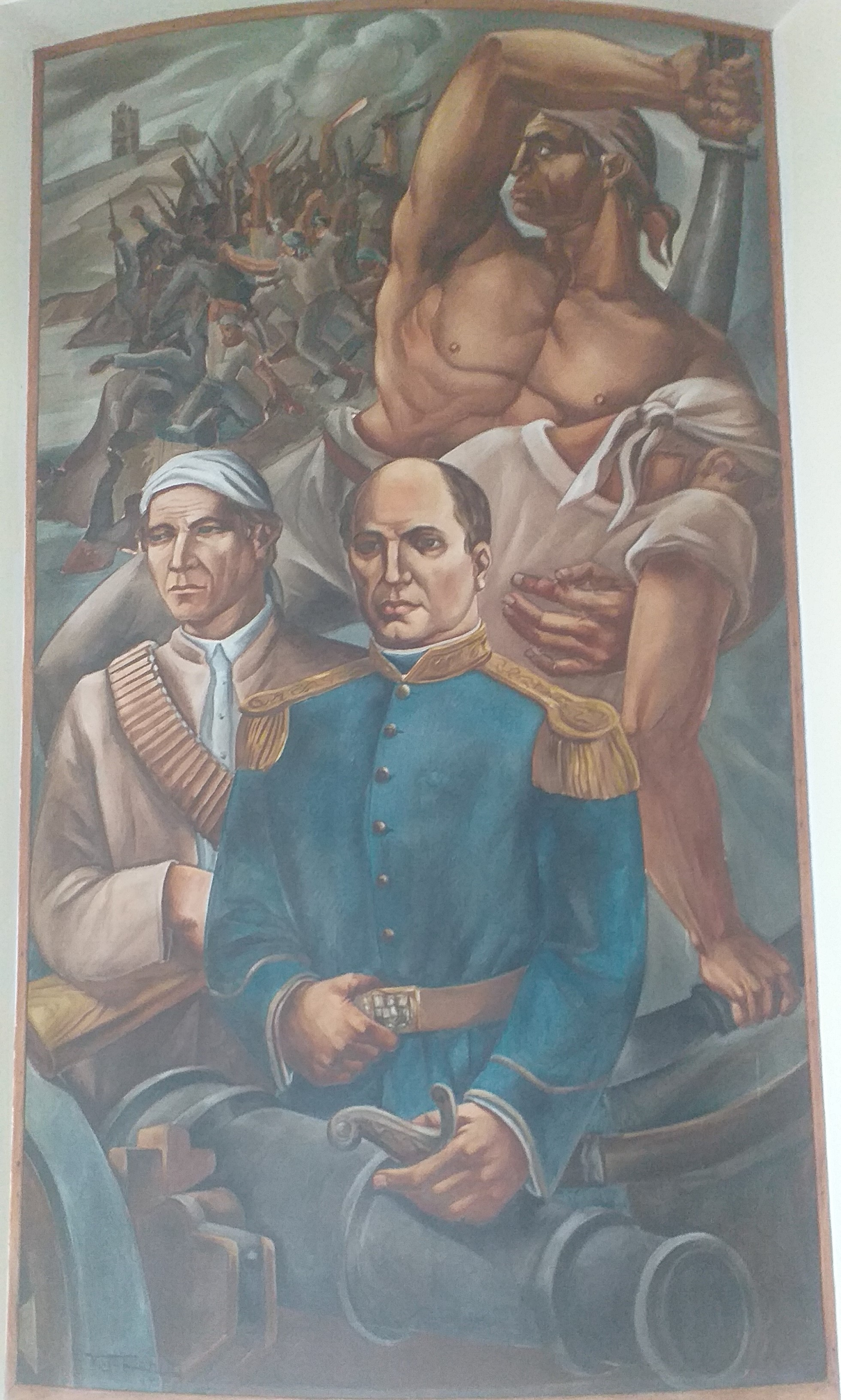
- Mural painting of the Battle of Santiago.
Date	30 March 1844
Location	Santiago de los Caballeros, Santiago Province
Result	Dominican victory

Belligerents
Dominican Republic	Haiti

Commanders and leaders
Gen. José María Imbert; Col. Pedro Eugenio Pelletier	(Haiti) Gen. Jean-Louis Pierrot (Haiti) Gen. St.-Louis

Strength
2900 infantry 100 cavalry 3 cannons 3 forts	10,000 Infantry

Casualties and losses
1 wounded	600–715 killed

The Battle of Santiago (Spanish: Batalla de Santiago de 1844) was the second major battle of the Dominican War of Independence and was fought on the 30 March 1844, at Santiago de los Caballeros, Santiago Province. Although outnumbered, Dominican troops, part of the Army of The North and led by General José María Imbert, defeated Haitian Army troops led by General Jean-Louis Pierrot.

== Background ==
Following the Dominican Declaration of Independence on February 27, 1844, Haitian President Charles Rivière-Hérard organized an army of about 30,000 men, dividing them into three columns to invade Dominican territory. The northern column, consisting of 10,000 men led by General Jean-Louis Pierrot, was tasked with capturing Santiago and Puerto Plata, with the ultimate goal of advancing toward Santo Domingo to join the southern forces and besiege the capital.

== Prelude ==
In the final week of March 1844, Santiago de los Caballeros, the capital of the Cibao region, faced significant uncertainty as Haitian forces, led by General Jean-Louis Pierrot and numbering around 10,000 men, advanced towards the city. The local population experienced widespread fear and a sense of disorder, with many contemplating fleeing or preparing for the worst. The city’s defense was disorganized, and key military leaders, including General Felipe Vázquez, left their posts due to health concerns.

Despite the initial panic, leadership from General Matías Ramón Mella and General José María Imbert helped to stabilize the situation. The defenders of Santiago organized their forces, reinforced positions, and made preparations for the Haitian assault. This shift in morale set the stage for the upcoming battle, which would be crucial for the city's defense and the larger context of Dominican independence.

The fortifications around the city were manned with artillery pieces, the most powerful of which was an 8-inch cannon located at the Dios fort, under the command of Captain José María López. Santiago's youth battalion, La Flor, commanded by Colonel Ángel Reyes, took position in the same fort. The Libertad fort, which had weaker artillery, housed troops from La Vega, led by Captains Ramón Martínez and Marcos Trinidad.

To the west, at the "old cemetery," Captain Fernando Valerio and his company from the Sabana Iglesia battalion were stationed as a forward defense. Finally, General Francisco Antonio Salcedo, also known as Tito Salcedo, was assigned to cover the rear at the San Luis Fortress. The Haitian forces, advancing in two columns that followed parallel routes along the Yaque River, crossed the river at "Paso Real" and moved along the "Otra Banda" road, while the other column, passing through "Cuesta Colorada," reached the area now known as Gurabito. This set the stage for the decisive battle that would follow, as both sides prepared for the upcoming clash.

== The Battle ==
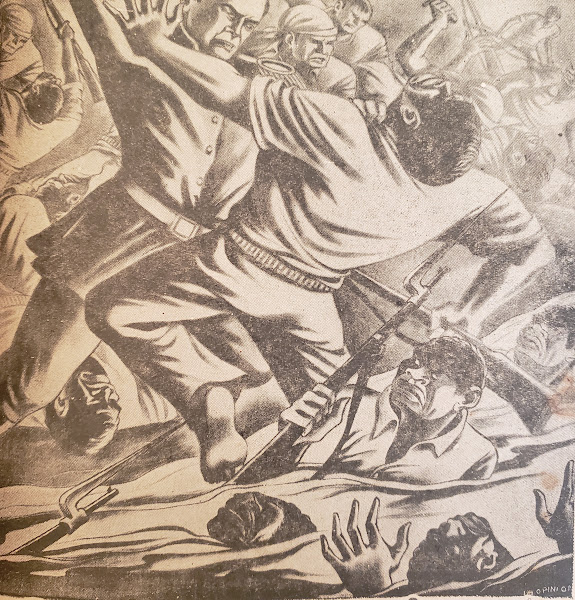
Illustration of General José Maria Imbert in the Battle of Santiago (1844).

The battle unfolded on March 30, 1844, with the Haitian forces approaching the Dominican city of Santiago, divided into two columns of roughly 2,000 men each. The first column advanced quickly and in good order, with infantry marching in formation and cavalry leading the charge, heading towards the Dominican left flank, which was the most vulnerable point in the defense. Dominican forces, under the command of Colonel Pedro Eugenio Pelletier, were quick to respond. Based on reports of the vulnerability of the left, half of the central Dominican forces, led by Commander Archille Michell, were redirected to reinforce the left flank. This change of position was met with enthusiasm, as some of the soldiers who had been stationed in the center rushed to support the defense.

The initial clash saw the Dominican forces engage the Haitian column with a barrage of gunfire. The Haitians, faced with strong resistance, hesitated and then retreated in disarray. However, they soon regrouped and returned to the fray. Their forces attacked once again in a tighter, more organized formation, charging in column formation toward the Dominican positions. This second assault was met with devastating artillery fire from the Dominican side. The Dominican artillery, especially at the right flank, inflicted heavy casualties on the Haitian forces, including those in the head of the column, severely weakening their resolve and forcing a retreat.

The battle could be divided into two distinct phases: the first phase began when the Haitian columns initially advanced toward the Dominican defenses, particularly focusing on the left flank, which had been reinforced after the first engagement. The second phase commenced with the Haitian forces regrouping and launching their final, intense attack in column formation, which also ended in failure after heavy losses from Dominican artillery.

Throughout the battle, several key elements stood out. The Haitian forces displayed unusual tactics, moving forward without the usual reconnaissance or skirmishing expected in warfare. This lack of preparatory action was unusual for a force experienced in warfare. When the Haitians first encountered Dominican resistance, they were initially caught off guard and retreated, only to return moments later. Their retreat and failure to secure a victory raised questions about their strategies and intentions. Some theories suggest that the Haitians may have hoped to take the city by surprise, capitalizing on a moment of disorganization within the Dominican ranks.

There were also speculations about internal collaborators, or "fifth column" elements, within the city who may have aided the Haitian forces. The most notable indication of this was the death of Colonel Núñez, one of the Haitian officers, under mysterious circumstances, which could have disrupted their plans. Some believe his death might have led to a shift in strategy and potentially delayed the main assault.

In the end, after several waves of attacks and substantial casualties on both sides, the Haitian forces finally gave up and withdrew, with the battle concluding by 5 PM. [Contradictory information, citation needed] The fighting was characterized by unexpected tactical shifts, with both sides adapting to rapidly changing situations on the battlefield. Despite the initial Haitian advances and efforts to break the Dominican defenses, the resilience of the Dominican forces, bolstered by their artillery and strategic positioning, ultimately led to the failure of the Haitian assault. The battle marked a turning point in the Dominican struggle for independence, as the Haitian forces were unable to secure their objectives, despite multiple attempts.

== Aftermath ==
The exact number of Haitian troops involved in the battle remains uncertain. Haitian sources claim there were 15,000, while others, such as Heneken, estimate 12,000, and Dr. Llenas calculates around 8,000. However, it appears that only around 4,000 troops, comprising the vanguard, actively engaged in the battle. The number of Dominican forces is not clearly documented. General José María López, in a letter written in 1881, estimated that the Haitians outnumbered the Dominicans by four to one, which would suggest the Dominican forces numbered around 3,000 or fewer.

The troops from San Pedro de Macorís, Cotuí, La Vega, Moca, and Santiago seemed well-supplied with arms and ammunition, as there are no reports of shortages, unlike the situation with Santana's army in the south. U.S. Navy Captain Harrison, cited by Sebastián Emilio Valverde, claimed that he had provided ammunition to help defeat the Haitian forces in Santiago.

The Battle of Santiago was pivotal in saving Santiago from falling and solidifying the young Dominican Republic’s fledgling independence. Had Pierrot captured Santiago, it is likely the capital would have soon fallen as well, possibly leading to a collapse of the new Republic. The significance of the battle lies in its military importance, preventing a strategic defeat that could have had dire consequences for the Dominican cause. Haitian historian Thomas Madiou affirms the Dominican victory, stating that Pierrot was defeated in front of Santiago and forced to retreat.

== See also ==
- Battle of Cabeza de Las Marías
- Battle of Azua
- Battle of El Memiso
- Battle of Tortuguero
- Battle of Estrelleta
- Battle of Beler
- Battle of El Número
- Battle of Las Carreras
