= Pedro Guillermo =

14th President of the Dominican Republic (1865–1865)

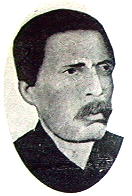
image of Pedro Guillermo y Guerrero

Pedro Guillermo y Guerrero (June 29, 1814 – February 18, 1867) was a soldier, merchant, and politician from the Dominican Republic. He served as 14th President of the Dominican Republic from November 15, 1865 until December 8 of that year.

He fought in the Dominican War of Independence, specifically in the Battle of Azua, Battle of Estrelleta, Battle of El Número, and the Battle of Las Carreras. During the Spanish annexation of the Dominican Republic in 1861, Guillermo was opposed and organized the first uprising at Hato Mayor del Rey on October 2, 1863.

He became president of the Republic on November 15, 1865, until the arrival of Buenaventura Báez on December 8, 1865. During his government, he concentrated all of his energy on fighting for Buenaventura Báez's return to power.

== Early life ==
He was born in Media Chiva, in the Hato Mayor del Rey municipality, Hato Mayor province, Dominican Republic, on June 29, 1814. His parents were vegan merchants, José Guillermo and Francisca Guerrero, born in Barcelona, Venezuela. On November 20, 1843, he married Rosalía Bastardo with whom he had three children, two girls who died and a male named Cesáreo Guillermo Bastardo, who later became President of the Republic.
