= Elías Piña (soldier) =

Dominican soldier (1799–1845)

Colonel Elías Piña (1799 – August 1845) was a soldier from what is now the Dominican Republic who fought in the Dominican War of Independence. He took part in the border clashes against Haitian forces during the second campaign of 1845, in which he was fatally wounded and died of his injuries at the end of the campaign.

== Biography ==
He was born in 1799 in Margarita, a border point and former place of Las Matas de Farfán. He was of full Indigenous ancestry. He has one brother, Francisco, who was said to have military experience. Not much is known about his upbringing, but it is presumed that he was poorly educated and had worked as a peasant.

== Dominican War of Independence ==
In 1844, the First Dominican Republic declared its sovereignty from neighboring Haiti. However, this would not come easily, and the Dominicans would have to fight a series of wars against invading Haitian armies to maintain its sovereignty. Piña, along with his brother, enlisted in the Dominican Army, and quickly reached the rank of colonel.

During the Dominican War of Independence, he fought in several bloody clashes in the border towns. He took part in the Siege of Fort Cachimán and the Battle of Estrelleta with General Antonio Duvergé and General José Joaquín Puello.

At some point, in 1845, Piña was commanding the Las Matas Regiment while attacking the fortified position of Bánica. He was badly wounded when he was struck by an enemy bullet. In August 1845, his wound proved fatal, and he eventually died of his injures at the age of 46. His brother, Francisco Piña, who was at his side during that campaign, and died of canon fire.

== Legacy ==
In the 1970s, the province of Elías Piña would be named after him.

== See also ==
- Dominican War of Independence
- Elías Piña Province
- Battle of Fort Cachimán
