= Antonio Duvergé =

Dominican soldier and general (1807–1855)

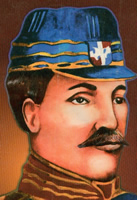
- Portrait of General Antonio Duvergé c. 1840s-1850s
- Born: Antonio Duvergé Duval; 1807; Mayagüez, Captaincy General of Puerto Rico
- Died: 1855 (aged 47–48); El Seibo Province, Dominican Republic
- Burial place: National Pantheon of the Dominican Republic
- Military career
- Allegiance: Dominican Republic
- Branch: Dominican Army: Liberation Army
- Service years: 1836–1855
- Rank: General
- Nicknames: The border sentinel, “Bois” (in Spanish pronounced, “Buá”)
- Conflicts: Dominican War of Independence: Battle of Azua; Battle of El Memiso; Battle of Fort Cachimán; Battle of Estrelleta; Battle of El Número; Battle of Las Carreras

Antonio Duvergé Duval (1807 – April 11, 1855), was a Dominican military figure who is considered one of the most prominent military leaders during the Dominican War of Independence. He is primarily remembered both for the battles he commanded in this feat and for the enmity he aroused against general and President Pedro Santana, who was in charge of promoting the military junta that later sentenced him to death along with his son Alcides in 1855.

His most famous participation took place in the Battle of Azua, where he ironically fought alongside Santana for the first time. In this conflict, they comprised a group of approximately 2,500 Dominican soldiers, mostly composed of peasants armed with machetes and swords, who were recruited to confront the Haitian army. A part of the southern army was led by General Pedro Santana, where they defeated 10,000 Haitian soldiers led by General Souffront. After victory was proclaimed by the Dominican side, Duvergé would become known nationally as one of the best prepared soldiers in the country at that time, earning nicknames such as "The sentinel of the border" or the "Sun Tzu of the machete." Duvergé is not only recognized as a fundamental part of his adoptive nation, the Dominican Republic, obtaining its freedom, but also as a representative in the flesh of the desire for universal justice without ties related to the ethnic and social origin of an individual.

== Family origins ==
"Vergier de La Rochejacquelein" is the name of an ancient French noble family originally from the Vendée, famous for their devotion to the House of Bourbon during and after the French Revolution. Its original name was du Vergier, derived from a fief near Bressuire in Poitou, and its pedigree dates back to the 13th century. In 1505, Gui Duverger married Renée, heiress of Jacques Lemartin, lord of La Rochejacquelein, whose name he assumed. His grandson, Louis Duverger, lord of La Rochejacquelein, was a devout supporter of Henry II of France and was seriously wounded at the Battle of Arques; Other members of the family were also distinguished soldiers, and the manor was elevated to an earldom and a marquisate in reward for their services.

Noble coat of arms of the du Vergier family of La Rochejaquelein

=== Most notable members ===
- Henri, comte de La Rochejacquelein, was the youngest general of the Royalist Vendéan insurrection during the French Revolution. He served as commander-in-chief of the Catholic and Royal Army.
- Louis, marquis de La Rochejacquelein, the younger brother of Henri, fled France with his father after the Storming of the Bastille, served in the Army of Condé, and entered the service of England in America. He returned to France during the Consulate, and in 1801 married the marquise de Lescure, the widow of his brother's friend, the marquis de Lescure, who had been mortally wounded at Cholet.
- Marie Louise Victoire de Donnissan, marquise de La Rochejacquelein, the wife of Louis, was born at Versailles on 25 October 1772, belonged to a court family and was the god-daughter of Madame Victoire, the daughter of Louis XV. At the age of seventeen she married the marquis de Lescure, whom she accompanied during the Revolt in the Vendée. After his death, she went through various adventures recorded in her memoirs, first published at Bordeaux in 1815. They are of extreme interest, and give a remarkable picture of the war and the fortunes of the Royalists. She saved much of her own property and her first husband's, when a conciliatory policy was adopted. After her second marriage to the cousin of her first husband, she lived with her new husband on her estates, both refusing all offers to serve in any capacity under Napoleon. In 1814, they took an active part in the Royalist movement in and about Bordeaux. In 1815 the marquis endeavoured to bring about another Vendan rising for Louis XVIII, and was shot in a skirmish with the forces of Napoleon at the Pont des Marthes on 4 June 1815. The marquise died at Orléans in 1857.
- Henri Auguste Georges, marquis de La Rochejacquelein, the eldest son of Louis and Marie Louise Victoire, was born at Château Citran in the Gironde on 28 September 1805, was educated as a soldier, served in Spain in 1822, and as a volunteer in the Russo-Turkish War, 1828-1829. During the reign of Louis Philippe I he adhered to the legitimist policy of his family, but he became reconciled to the government of Napoleon III and was mainly known as a clerical orator and philanthropist. He died on 7 January 1867.
- Julien Marie Gaston, marquis de La Rochejacquelein, the son and successor of Henri Auguste Georges, was born at Chartres on 27 March 1833, was an active Legitimist deputy in the Assembly chosen at the close of the German War of 1870-1871. He was a strong opponent of Adolphe Thiers, and continued to contest constituencies as a Legitimist with varying fortunes till his death in 1897.

=== Migration to the Caribbean ===
One of its members, Alexandre (Alejandro) du Vergier, was born in the city of Nantes and was the son of Louis Duverger, lord of La Rochejacquelein, who with his cousin Henri Louis Auguste fled abroad at the beginning of the French Revolution due to the Drownings at Nantes. The final destination of both cousins was the Spanish island, which at that time was divided between two colonies, with the western part being under French control and the eastern part under Spanish control. Saint Domingue, representing the western part of the island, was not only the most prosperous and richest colony in France but is also among the best in the world. For these reasons, it was more than evident which was going to be the indicated refuge and subsequently their next home. Alexander built a prosperous life in Saint Domingue, where he owned some land and a couple of black slaves. It is known that at some point he was married to a black woman, who had several children with him, but it has not yet been established what her name was or what she did for a living. It is also known that Alexander fought on the French side during the Haitian revolution against Toussaint Louverture, but he died in battle. Thanks to the children he had and the migrations in which they were involved over time, it could be said that he was the founder of this family, at least on this side of the world, where you can still find people who carry his last name in various parts of the Caribbean and South America.

== Early life ==
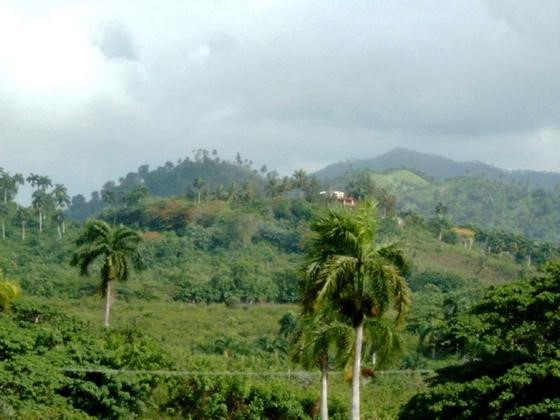
San Cristobal was very important in most of the general's life

His parents, José (Joseph) Duvergé, who was the son of Alejandro (Alexander) Duverger, and María (Marie) Duval, were mulatto Creoles from the French colony of Saint Domingue, probably of a comfortable economic position, living in Mirebalais, a town in the central zone. not far from the border. Like so many other owners, they were forced to emigrate from Saint Domingue to Dominican territory (at that time the Spanish Santo Domingo), for having expressed solidarity with the positions of the mulatto sector of "free old men" who confronted the rise of the freed slaves. Because of this, Duverge's parents considered themselves French citizens instead of Haitians; Therefore, refractory to the establishment of an independent state governed by blacks. It is likely that, like other emigrated mulattoes, they planned to settle permanently in Santo Domingo from very early on. However, they were forced to move to Puerto Rico shortly after, like many Dominicans and refugees from the French colony, in order to protect themselves from Haitian insurgents. In 1807, the year of Antonio's birth, his parents had been residing for some time in Tortuguero, a town near Mayagüez. José Duvergé made his living in a sugar mill located near a forested area. His work forced him to remain in the mountains, and he was there when his wife gave birth. From there came the nickname Bois-Buá (forest in French), with which Duvergé came to be designated by his acquaintances. The position of his parents in Puerto Rico could not be relieved, so, like thousands of Dominican emigrants, they decided to return to Santo Domingo as soon as the threat of war disappeared, following the division of Haiti into two States.

Little is known about the subsequent development of the family. During the first decade of life in Dominican territory, the Duvergé settled in El Seibo, where they endured an existence full of deprivation. Around 1818 they moved to San Cristóbal, perhaps taking advantage of the fact that they had relatives living there. The formation of the hero was linked to the space of San Cristóbal and surrounding areas. During those years José Duvergé continued dedicated to agricultural work, but he was able to save a small sum of money that allowed him to dedicate himself to the business of cutting precious woods, thereby improving his situation. Arriving in the country at less than two years old, Duvergé integrated into the environment as another Dominican, without being hindered by the origin of his parents. A symptom of this association was the change from the original surname, Duverger to the Duverge that is currently known in Dominican territory.

Duvergé decided to remain in the land after the implementation of Haitian rule in 1822. Family traumas did not overcome his determination to continue residing in the country, to which must be added the peaceful way in which Jean Pierre Boyer's rule was established. In any case, it is likely that his family origin in some way contributed to his irreducible connection with the Dominican. It is said that José Duvergé inoculated his son with aversion to Haitian rule, as an expression of the traumatic experiences that he had gone through as a result of belonging to the mulatto sector. But, this does not mean that Antonio Duvergé viewed the order in Haiti from the perspective of the former French owners. Rather, he developed concepts consistent with his location as a Dominican.

This is demonstrated in the proclamation that he addressed to the Haitians on December 18, 1848, in the response to the one that President Faustin Soulouque had sent to the Dominicans days before. It is a document that contrasts the political-social systems of the two countries. On the Dominican side, Duvergé highlights effective and fruitful national solidarity:

Your government reminds us through its proclamation that African blood circulates through our veins, and who among us has doubted it? Take a look at all our civil and military employees of all categories, you will see them indistinctly tinted by the various colors that human nature produces, and you will distinguish only one scale to ascend to the highest positions in the Republic, virtue.

== Marriage to Rosa Montas ==
An interesting chapter in Duverge's existence was his marriage, in 1831, to the also mulatto, María Rosa Montás, born in Mirebalais and whose father, the Haitian Juan Claudio (Duson) Clebride, was a justice of the peace of the community of San Cristobal for 1828. Despite sharing a certainly common origin with that of Duvergé, with the difference that Rosa's family was loyal to the Haitian regime, it did not present any type of tie for Rosa to support her husband at all times, even in his contribution to the independence process. With her, he also had seven children, these being: Isabel, Maria Loreto, Policarpio, Alcides, José Daniel, Nicanor and Tomás.

=== Wood cutting ===
It is known that Duvergé, independent of his father from a young age, dedicated himself to cutting mahogany and other precious woods, the main economic activity at the time. Wood cutting was generally undertaken by the former owners of cattle herds and by a category of what is today designated as the middle class, located between the large merchants of the port and the peasantry. Much of the political and military leadership of independence and the political action of the subsequent decades obtained its material support from logging activity. This required expertise linked to the rural environment. The lumber-cutting entrepreneur had to deal with rough workers in rugged wilderness and was subject to considerable economic risks. In fact, the activity left low profit margins, those necessary for the family's subsistence.

The formation of Duverge's warrior skills must not have been unrelated to his long occupation as a wood cutter. He was forced to make frequent tours of the southern region, which allowed him a deep knowledge of the people and the geography, which reached the border limits. His attitude as a warrior was related to the environment where he fought all the battles, to his people, towns, rivers, mountains and ravines, which he knew like the palm of his hand.

== Military life ==
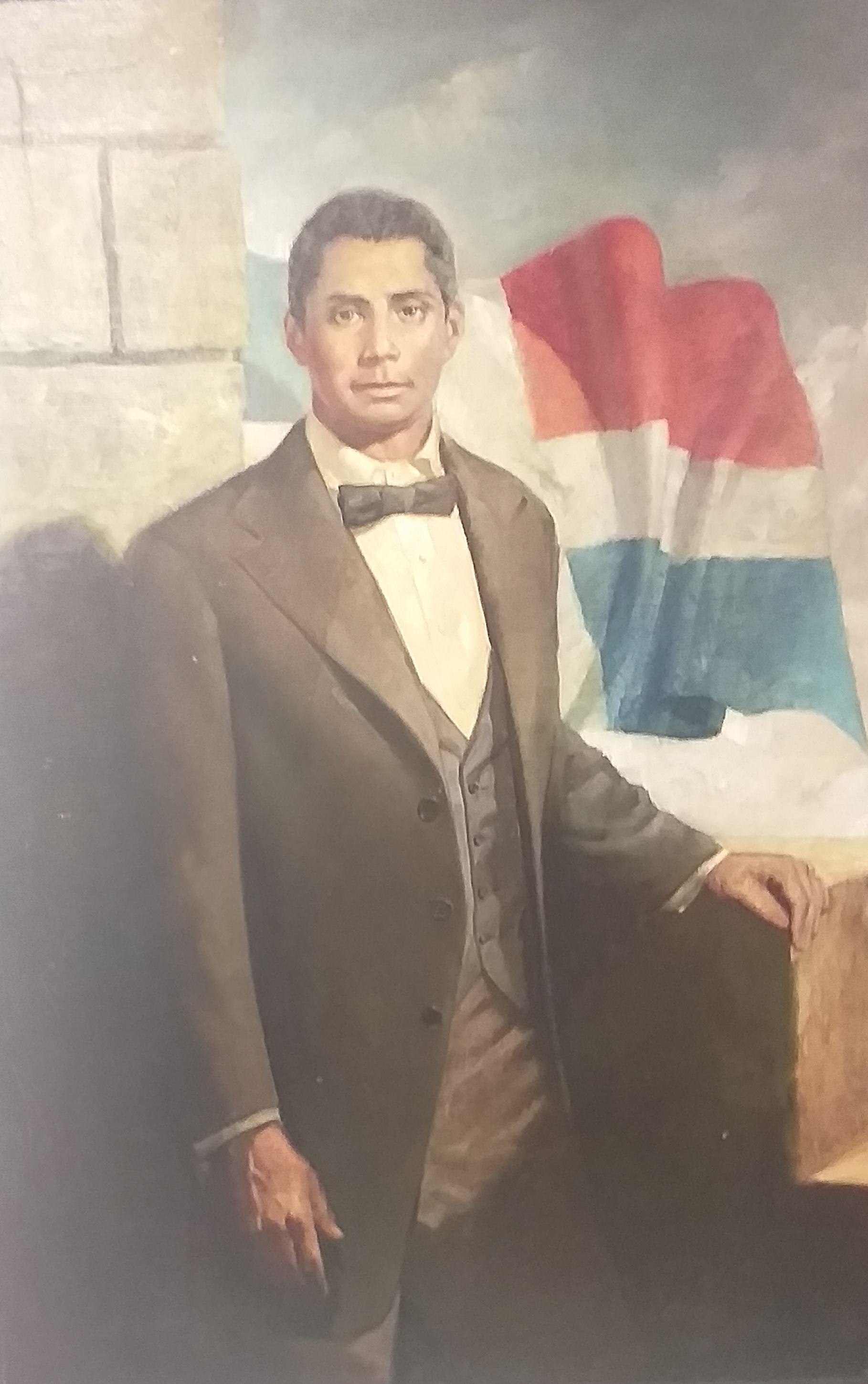
Francisco del Rosario Sanchez, second founding father of the Dominican Republic and personal friend of Duvergé

Duvergé joined the Haitian army, not voluntarily but as a recruit. He, too, did not distinguish himself as much as a man-at-arms. His role as a soldier should rather be attributed to his relative social status as a small logging businessman and the skills acquired in the years of hard work in the mountains. Even with these possible shortcomings, his connection with the independence conspiracy that led to the proclamation of the First Dominican Republic in 1844 was made from a military angle. The nuclei of conspirators assigned him the mission of ensuring that the statement was supported in the area west of San Cristóbal. For this purpose, he associated himself with prestigious figures who became part of the improvised armed forces of the nascent State. Duvergé was so committed to the preparations that, on February 28, he appeared before the city walls in order to receive direct instructions from the leaders of the movement regarding how to confront Buenaventura Báez's opposition to the break with Haiti.

After conferring with Francisco del Rosario Sánchez, he took the road back to Azua. He passed by San Cristóbal, where others were in charge of making arrangements for the organization of the new order, but he stopped in Baní to collaborate with Joaquín Objío in pronouncing the end of Haitian rule. He soon continued towards Azua, under pressure to prepare the defensive device against a foreseeable Haitian attack. Upon arriving, he toured the streets of the city inciting the residents to take up arms. He became "the natural head" of the incipient national order from Azua to the west.

His work was facilitated by the existence of a widely shared state of opinion that led to the willingness to fight being assumed by a considerable portion of the adult male population. During the subsequent days, he managed to set up a defensive line in Azua, a town of critical military importance, both because it was the main city in the south and because the two routes that linked the city of Santo Domingo with Haiti branched there. It was foreseeable, as in fact it happened, that bodies of the Haitian army would converge at that point. Duvergé considered the convenience of concentrating forces and not advancing towards the border. Although he had arranged measures for the organization of troops in the towns near that area, his sagacity indicated to him that at that moment there was no possibility of preventing the enemy from reaching Azua.

=== Start of the War ===
The first incidents of weapons occurred around Lake Enriquillo. The Haitian advances found at the Fuente del Rodeo, the opposition of the few Dominican troops commanded by Fernando Tavera, who achieved a fragile victory. Afterwards, the Dominicans suffered successive defeats in the Battle of Cabezas de las Marías and had to retreat. The troops stationed in Azua were awaiting the imminent arrival of the Haitian army. Since he arrived in the area, shortly before the Battle of Azua on March 19, Pedro Santana took command of the operations as general in chief of the Southern Expeditionary Corps. He brought hundreds of men from El Seibo, who showed warrior skill. When arranging the order of the troops, Santana designated a staff and a command echelon, assigning Duvergé relevant tasks with the rank of colonel. He was accompanied by commanders called to play a leading role in subsequent war events, such as colonels Manuel Mora and Feliciano Martínez.

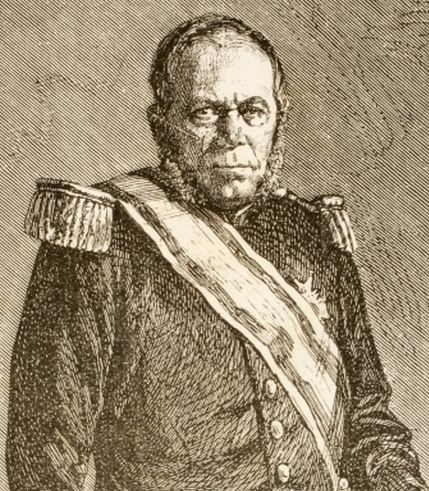
Illustration by Don Pedro Santana

As head of the entire troop in Azua, Santana was able to assess the efficiency with which Duvergé performed, both during the preparations and in the hustle and bustle of combat itself, on March 19, where he occupied the most difficult position in the vanguard. and which essentially consisted of a surprise rejection of the advance march of the Haitian army. According to the stories, Duvergé led the contingent located in El Burro, where his performance managed to stop the march of his rivals in their tracks. The massive assault with a knife led by him contributed decisively to the outcome favorable to the Dominicans. One of his closest friends, Francisco Soñé, was possibly the second most distinguished person in the battle, directing one of the artillery pieces that stopped the enemy advance.

A few hours after that encounter, Santana ordered the withdrawal in the direction of Baní, citing a numerical disadvantage with respect to the enemy's forces. There is no indication that any of his subordinates, including Duvergé, disagreed with the decision, although it was inconvenient, since a setback had been inflicted on the Haitian army. It took two days for President Charles Rivière-Hérard, in his camp a few kilometers away, to receive the information that Azua had been evacuated and order it to be occupied. On the other hand, Herard decided not to advance beyond the lands abandoned by the Dominicans, which was influenced by the fear of suffering a new defeat and the awareness that conspiracies to overthrow him swarmed behind him. Despite the paralysis that rendered the Haitian army useless, Santana decided not to move, an attitude motivated both by military considerations and political calculation, to clear the way for a French intervention.

However, he was forced to change his immobility when he received news that the enemy army was seeking to envelop his positions from the north, after failing along the coastal road, subjected to fire from several Dominican merchant schooners that were shelled. Hérard ordered a troop to attack El Maniel (today San José de Ocoa), and Sagrana deployed a contingent to confront it, to whose head he appointed Duvergé. In El Memiso, a ravine in the lower foothills of the mountain range, possibly on April 30, the Dominicans stopped the Haitian advance. It was an occasion where Duverge's expertise was highlighted when he took advantage of the irregularities of the terrain to wait for the Haitians on cliffs from which large stones were thrown at them. The triumph of El Memiso confirmed that the Dominicans had the ability to win, contrary to the fears of Santana, who came to assume that a defeat had been suffered. Santana, lacking faith in national independence and imbued with rigid conservative criteria, was interested only in gaining time so that the Government Junta could obtain the protectorate of France.

=== Rise of Duvergé ===
When Santana assumed the presidency of the Central Government Board, in mid-July, he appointed Duvergé as head of the Southern Expeditionary Front with the rank of brigade general. The headquarters of said body was founded in Las Matas de Farfán, from where it served the broad central portion of the border. In the following months, the action against Cachimán, a fort built by the Haitians in Dominican territory, between Bánica and Las Caobas, stood out.

Upon recovering the land, the Dominican troops had still not managed to take control over all the other areas belonging to the Spanish colony in accordance with the Treaty of Aranjuez of 1777. After the departure of Herard's troops, the Hincha pocket and other populations had not been recovered, surely because of having established a large Haitian population, already the majority. This was not the case in other regions, such as the one next to Cachimán, which was sparsely populated, which led to the fort being taken for the first time in the first week of December 1844, thus ending the campaign that had begun months before.

The Haitian army refused to recognize the Dominican presence in Cachimán, which is why it became a flashpoint of the dispute and continuous clashes took place in its surroundings. From his headquarters in Las Matas de Farfán, Duvergé addressed the subordinates who defended the symbolic outpost of Dominican sovereignty.

The situation worsened when General Jean-Louis Pierrot became president of Haiti, who proposed to resume an offensive line against the Dominicans. In May 1845, the Haitian president ordered a general mobilization and invasion of Dominican territory. In advance of the massive incursion plan, the Haitian army deployed restricted assaults, in one of which it managed to dislodge the Dominicans from Cachimán, seen as the key to the next phase of the offensive on the southern border. Duvergé gathered troops and led the attack that managed to expel the Haitians from the fort for the second time.

Taking advantage of the moral effect of this triumph, in the following days he arranged an advance on the Dominican territories still controlled by the Haitians, an effort that proved fruitless. The Haitian response was immediate, as part of Pierrot's decision to crush Dominican independence. The main generals of the neighboring country took part in it: Thelemaque, Toussaint and Morissette. Between July and September 1845, the Dominican army, led by Duvergé, carried out maneuvers until it once again managed to gain control over Las Matas de Farfán and restrict the war to the border area. The government sent José Joaquín Puello, Minister of the Interior and Police, to collaborate with Duvergé. After various troop movements, General Puello fought in La Estrelleta, a savanna near the Matayaya River, where he inflicted an unprecedented defeat on the Haitian army. It was not necessary for the body commanded by Duvergé to arrive. In any case, the maneuvers of the other contingent were essential for Puello to achieve a resounding victory. This fact led to the collapse of Pierrot's planes, who was overthrown from the presidency.

After concluding the 1845 campaign in the Battle of Estrelleta, Duvergé was promoted to division general and appointed political head of the province of Azua. He moved his headquarters to San Juan de la Maguana and delegated the care of the border to Valentín Alcántara, his main subordinate. Although he had no immediate intention of recovering the Dominican territories under Haitian control, during the following years Duvergé remained on constant alert. From time to time he ordered restricted incursions, among other things to hinder the action of the "maroteros", who carried out depredations on both sides of the border.

At the Battle of El Numero Duvergé encountered a force that outnumbered the Dominican troops with 15,000 soldiers from the Haitian army led by General Jean Francois Jeannot, sent by Emperor Faustin I of Haiti (Faustin Soulouque) to reconquer the Dominican Republic. He was also known as the Father of the Dominican offensive strategy of 1845.

== Military trial ==
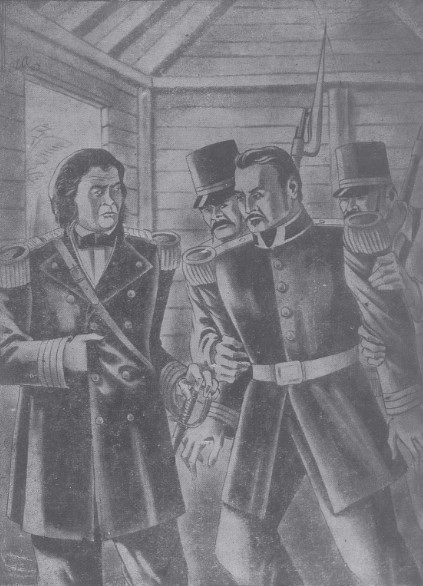
Illustration of Duvergé confined to prison by Santana in 1849.

After the campaign of 1849, Duvergé was subjected, imprisoned along with other officers, to a military trial. He was acquitted, but the conflicts between him and Pedro Santana became increasingly clear. After this Antonio Duvergé was confined in El Seibo, far from the south where he had been the hero of many battles and where he had his modest agricultural positions. In 1853 General Pedro Santana returned to power and the outgoing president Buenaventura Baez went into exile in Saint Thomas, where he began to encourage rebellion against Santana's government. With those encouragements from Baez bearing fruit, the first conspiracy against Santana was articulated. The conspirators sought help from the figures of Antonio Duvergé and Francisco del Rosario Sánchez who associated themselves with the movement. But the plan was revealed and Duvergé was arrested and handed over to the newly formed military commission of El Seibo.

== Death ==
Duvergé led a quiet life during his confinement in El Seibo, dedicated to his subsistence activities. However, when Santana returned to the presidency in 1853 he became aware that he would be his victim at the first opportune opportunity. The most important step that Santana took at the beginning of his third administration was to denounce his one-time protégé, Buenaventura Báez, as a traitor, arranging for his arrest and deportation. He had learned that Báez, while in office, tried to undermine his ascendancy. Santana could not prevent the retrograde nature of his regime from manifesting itself and denting a considerable part of his prestige. Gradually, Báez's supporters mobilized to bring him back to power. From the outside, the deported dancers were preparing to carry out an armed expedition. Perhaps the most important of the conspiracies was the one led by Pedro Eugenio Pelletier, one of the Frenchmen with military experience who had made a career in the country. The purpose of the attempt was to provoke a statement in the city of Santo Domingo that would start an insurrection. Many people were compromised, such as Pedro Ramón de Mena and Francisco del Rosario Sánchez, even though he was under surveillance. A denunciation prevented success and the main conspirators were captured, while others managed to escape the country. One of the branches of the conspiracy had extended to El Seibo, and Duvergé took part in it. This attitude, which broke with his rejection of political activity, is explained by the fact that his personal position had become vulnerable after Santana's return to the presidency in 1853. He feared that at any moment the enemy of him had him murdered. It is likely, in any case, that in light of his experience, he considered it necessary to overthrow the autocracy, and therefore decided to show solidarity with Báez, who was the object of support from all the sectors that questioned Santana. The authorities received confidences and ordered the arrest of Duvergé along with his children and other conspirators. According to García Lluberes, "[...] the eternal Cain, who stalked him relentlessly, found the pretext he needed to unleash his fratricidal wrath on him [...J". Duvergé evaded arrest after receiving the notification and proceeded to hide in the nearby mountains. After a few days, he was captured, the victim of an accusation, and transferred to a court that sentenced him to death. In contrast to the treatment that the despot gave to the conspirators arrested in Santo Domingo, to whom he commuted the capital punishment, he ratified the sentence of Duvergé and the rest involved in El Seibo, including two of his children. He harbored so much resentment toward his former subordinate that he remained in El Seibo while the trial was being held and until the sentence was carried out. Santana's hatred reached unsuspected limits: Daniel Duvergé, one of Duverge's sons, a minor, had to be kept in prison until he came of age, when he would be shot, but he was saved. The other two sons of the hero, children aged nine and 11, were sentenced to confinement in Samaná.

On April 11, 1855, Duvergé and his son Alcides were taken to the El Seibo cemetery to be executed. They were accompanied to the scaffold by Commander Juan María Albert, the Trinidadian Tomás de la Concha and the Spaniard Pedro José Dalmau. As a last wish, Duvergé asked the picket leader that his son be shot first in order to save her the pain of seeing his father fall. He, brave in every test, could not hold back his tears when he saw his son riddled with bullets. After both Duvergé and his Alcides had been shot, Santana began to contemplate the corpses undaunted, but when he arrived in front of Duverge's, as if sensing that even dead, he could not diminish his glory as a warrior, he dismounted from his horse and, before The terrified looks of the crowd, he began to kick the corpse with the toes of his bloody boots. Duverge's execution was part of Santana's career, following those of María Trinidad Sánchez, Andrés Sánchez, José Joaquín Puello, Gabino Puello and Aniceto Freites, and would continue with those of José Contreras and Francisco del Rosario Sánchez and their 20 companions in 1861. His remains currently rest in the National Pantheon located in the Colonial City of Santo Domingo. He was one of the most prominent soldiers in Dominican history in favor of national independence.

== Physiognomy and Character ==
According to his contemporaries:

Everyone felt the spell that emanated, like a heroic nimbus, from his strong personality and his instinctive gift of command. The blue cloth military jacket fell on his shoulders like a lion's skin. The copious, well-groomed mustaches communicated an air of noble and attractive severity to his physiognomy. The green eyes, of a pure and sweet hue, hid in the depths a ray of energy that rushed at the moment of action as if his pupils were flashing lightning. The tanned complexion gave his face the appearance of a helmet burnished by the gunpowder of combat. The epic stature, the firm step, the lean body, the quick gesture and the communicative countenance: he was a full body, a hussar from head to toe.

== See also ==
- Dominican War of Independence
- Pedro Santana
- Matías Ramón Mella
- Francisco del Rosario Sánchez
- José Joaquín Puello

== Bibliography ==
- Balaguer, Joaquín. El centinela de la frontera. Santo Domingo, 1995.
- García, José Gabriel. Compendio de la historia de Santo Domingo. 4 vols. Santo Domingo, 1968.
- García, José Gabriel. Partes oficiales de las operaciones militares realizadas durante la guerra domínico-haitiana. Santo Domingo, 1888.
- García Lluberes, Alcides. Duarte y otros temas. Santo Domingo, 1971.
- García Lluberes, Leonidas. Crítica histórica. Santo Domingo, 1964.
- Hungría Morel, Radamés. Calendas históricas y militares dominicanas. Tomo I. Santo Domingo, 1985.
- Martínez, Rufino. Diccionario biográfico-histórico dominicano, 1821-1930. Santo Domingo, 1997.
- Rodríguez Demorizi, Emilio (ed.). Guerra domínico-haitiana. Ciudad Trujillo, 1957.
