= Battle of El Memiso =

1844 battle of the Dominican War of Independence

- Part of the Dominican War of Independence
- Battle of El Memiso (the Dominican Republic)
Date	13 April 1844
Location	El Memiso, Dominican Republic
Result	Dominican victory

Belligerents
Dominican Republic	Haiti

Commanders and leaders
Gen. Antonio Duvergé; Gen. Felipe Benicio Alfau	(Haiti) Col. Pierre Paul (Haiti) Col. Auguste Brouard

The Battle of El Memiso (Spanish: Batalla del Memiso) was the third major battle of the Dominican War of Independence and was fought on the 13 April 1844, at El Memiso, Azua Province. A force of Dominican troops, a portion of the Army of the South, led by General Antonio Duvergé, defeated an outnumbering force of the Haitian Army led by Col. Pierre Paul.

== Background ==
Since early March, the Haitian President Charles Rivière-Hérard organized an army of approximately 30,000 men to invade Dominican territory, dividing his forces into three columns. While the northern column, led by General Jean-Louis Pierrot, aimed to capture Santiago and Puerto Plata, Hérard personally led the southern column to take San Juan and Azua, with a third column under General Souffront targeting Neiba. Despite their initial advances, the Haitians suffered significant defeats in March, both in Azua on the 19 and Santiago on the 30, causing the northern column to retreat back to Haiti, leaving only Hérard’s southern forces. The Haitians then regrouped in Azua, hoping for reinforcements and supplies by sea.

== Prelude ==
After several weeks of inactivity in Azua since the defeat in March 19, two line regiments set out from the city: the 4th, commanded by Colonel Pierre Paul, and the 5th, led by Colonel Auguste Brouard. In order to avoid a direct confrontation with the forces under General Pedro Santana, stationed in Sabana Buey and Baní, the Haitian troops chose a more indirect route. They followed the path of El Maniel (present-day San José de Ocoa), skirting the mountains of El Número and Lomas de Rincón in Azua, along the western bank of the Ocoa River. This maneuver was strategically planned to give them the advantage of surprise and to minimize casualties by avoiding a head-on clash with the entrenched Dominican forces. The Haitian army carefully navigated through the rugged terrain, understanding the importance of maintaining the element of surprise as they advanced toward their objective.

== The battle ==
As the Haitian forces advanced, the Dominican troops, though lacking in adequate supplies and weaponry, launched a strategic offensive to disrupt the Haitian forces. The Dominican forces managed to harry the Haitian troops and gradually pushed them toward the narrow and rugged gorges of the El Pinar section of El Maniel.

At El Memiso, the Haitian forces found themselves intercepted by the determined Dominican soldiers, who, despite their shortages of arms and ammunition, utilized the terrain to their advantage. The defenders, demonstrating remarkable resourcefulness, even resorted to pushing large boulders and rocks down from the cliffs, effectively creating obstacles and hindrances for the advancing Haitians. The rough, mountainous landscape worked in favor of the Dominicans, turning it into a natural fortress that restricted the mobility of the Haitian troops.

The Haitians, unable to overcome the unexpected challenges posed by the terrain and the Dominican resistance, were forced to retreat.

== Aftermath ==
The Haitians ultimately failed to advance towards Santo Domingo by land due to the Dominican victory, which forced them to retreat to Azua. As they withdrew, the Haitian forces hoped to replenish their supplies through maritime reinforcements, relying on ships to deliver much-needed provisions.

However, the success of the Dominican navy, which intercepted Haitian vessels and forced them to retreat, marked a turning point. This series of defeats, both on land and at sea, effectively doomed the Haitian campaign, securing the independence of the Dominican Republic. The combination of failed land assaults and the loss of naval support ultimately led to the failure of Haiti's efforts to maintain control, ensuring the continuation of Dominican sovereignty.
