= Furcy Fondeur =

National Hero of the Dominican Republic

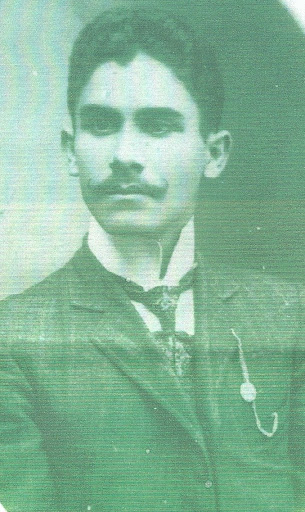

Minister of Foreign Relations of the Dominican Republic
- President: José María Cabral

Personal details
- Born: 1814 Paris, France
- Died: November 22, 1892 (aged 78) Santiago de los Caballeros, Dominican Republic
- Spouse(s): Jacinta Castro, María Luisa Fernández
- Children: 15
- Relatives: Rafael F. Bonnelly Fondeur (grandson); Gabriel del Orbe (great-grandson); Eugenio de Jesús Marcano Fondeur (great-grandnephew); Sully Bonnelly (great-great-grandson); Francisco Augusto Lora (great-grandnephew); Laura García-Godoy (great-great-grandniece); Jessica H Fondeur (5x-great-grand niece)

Military service
- Allegiance: Dominican Republic
- Branch/service: Dominican Army
- Years of service: 1844–1867
- Rank: Colonel
- Battles/wars: Dominican War of Independence; Dominican Restoration War

Colonel Furcy Fondeur Lajeunesse (1814 – November 22, 1892) was a French-born Dominican Republic military man and politician.

Born in France, his family moved to the Spanish Captaincy General of Santo Domingo around 1820. His father was Louis Fondeur and his mother was Marguerite LaJeunesse, Comtesse De La Juvenile; he had 5 siblings. He married Jacinta Castro and had 5 children, he was widowed and remarried to María Luisa Fernández Fernández (1837–1895) and had 10 children.

He resettled in Moca, where he took up arms against the invading Haitian army in the Battle of Santiago, during the Dominican War of Independence.

On September 14, 1863, Fondeur signed the Act of the Independence of the Dominican Republic from Spain (Spain having annexed the Dominican Republic two years earlier), and fought in the Dominican Restoration War as a colonel; he is considered a hero of the Battle of Santiago (1863). He was designated Minister of Foreign Affairs in 1867. Fondeur Lajeunesse was also president of the City Council of Santiago de los Caballeros.

== See also ==
- José María Imbert
- Pedro Eugenio Pelletier
