= Pedro Eugenio Pelletier =

Dominican military figure

General Pedro Eugenio Pelletier was a French-born Dominican military figure who was a leader in the Dominican War of Independence. He stood out in the Battle of Santiago, alongside José María Imbert against the invading Haitian army, led by Jean-Louis Pierrot. He later became involved in the early conspiracies against Pedro Santana, in which he faced persecution and subsequent exile, where he died.

== Biography ==
In 1844, during the Battle of Santiago, he had a prominent role after the Dominican governing board have called the general José María Imbert, who asked to be accompanied, among others by Pelletier, then Colonel and Chief of the main line. So he had his part in the battle, in which Dominican Republic emerged victorious. He would also gain fame for his participation in the Battle of Beler, fought on 27 October 1845. For his contributions, he reached the rank of general, and was even served as minister of the Interior of Police in 1852.

By 1853, as tensions between Pedro Santana and Buenaventura Báez erupted, Pelletier aligned himself to the latter. Two years later, in 1855, he joined a conspiracy movement to restore power back to Báez. He sought out generals Antonio Duvergé and Francisco del Rosario Sánchez for support in this movement. But unfortunately, the movement was caught, and the conspirators were arrested. In April 1855 Gen. Pelletier and Gen. Joaquín Aybar were arrested, accused of high treason and sentenced to death, for conspiring against President Santana; they were pardoned by President Santana in May 1855. He died in the neighboring island of Puerto Rico in 1861.

== See also ==
- Antonio Duvergé
- Furcy Fondeur
- José María Imbert
- Francisco del Rosario Sánchez
- Battle of Santiago
- Battle of Beler
- Buenaventura Báez
- Pedro Santana
