= Manuel Mora (soldier) =

Dominican militant and activist

Manuel Mora was a Dominican activist and soldier. A former slave from Santo Domingo, he participated in the Dominican War of Independence; He joined the Dominican Army as a colonel, later distinguishing himself in the Battle of Azua, on March 19, 1844 against Haitian forces under Charles Rivière-Hérard.

== Early years ==
He was born in the Spanish colony of Santo Domingo on the island of Hispaniola. Not much is known about his early life other than that he was a former slave who was freed under the emancipation proclamation by Jean-Pierre Boyer, a Haitian general who superheaded a military regime throughout the island.

== Dominican War of Independence ==
In 1844, the First Dominican Republic was established. Mora, having enlisted in the Dominican Army, took park in rebelling the invading Haitian army in the Battle of Azua.

However, in the Second Campaign of 1845, as a General, he participated in an untimely and unpatriotic act of insubordination carried out by troops recruited in San Cristóbal, at a time when the Haitian forces under Jean-Louis Pierrot invaded the Dominican Republic. Because of this, he was arrested by General José Joaquín Puello and sentenced to life imprisonment. He was sent to Puerto Plata to serve his sentence in the San Felipe Fortress.

After ten years of confinement, he was transferred to the Santo Domingo. His exhaustion was such that he was already affected by mental derangement. resolved the Government to confine him to Moca. This action never came into fruition was not fulfilled, and Buenaventura Báez, shortly after taking power, in 1856, ordered, through a decree, the definitive freedom of Mora. After his release, he returned to his military duties.

== Revolution in the Cibao ==
In 1857, while he was running an errand in Higüey fulfilling a promise the Cibaeño Revolution had broken out. When the plaza was attacked by Pedro Santana's supporters from El Seibo, he ran to the side of General Marcano, and bravely defended the since he was trusted. His line of defense was the one that did the most damage to the enemy. Afterwards, he moved then to Santo Domingo, and took part in almost all the actions of the long siege of the plaza. Due to his participation, giving his support of Báez, he took the path of exile when the revolution ended in 1858.

== Campaign of 1861 ==
In 1861, Spain invaded the Dominican Republic, reestablishing a colonial regime. During this time, an exiled general, Francisco del Rosario Sánchez, was carrying out plans in Saint Thomas, Curaçao, and Haiti to organize an expeditionary force to protest the reincorporation to Spain. Hearing this, Mora settled in Haiti and placed himself in the movement. He was assigned to the column of José María Cabral.

In June 1861, the force crossed the border and came to the territory, with Mora accompanying Cabral. When he gave up the company, given the first steps, Mora was one of those who managed, like all of Cabral's followers, to return to Haiti without setbacks. He stayed in that country permanently, for the same personal and political reasons as other Dominicans.

Not much else is known about his activities following the failed expedition of 1861, but it is believed that up until the days of the U.S occupation period, he was confined in prison once again, and his fate was left unknown.

== See also ==
- Battle of Azua
- José Joaquín Puello
- Dominican Restoration War
