= José María Imbert =

Dominican general and commander (1798–1847)

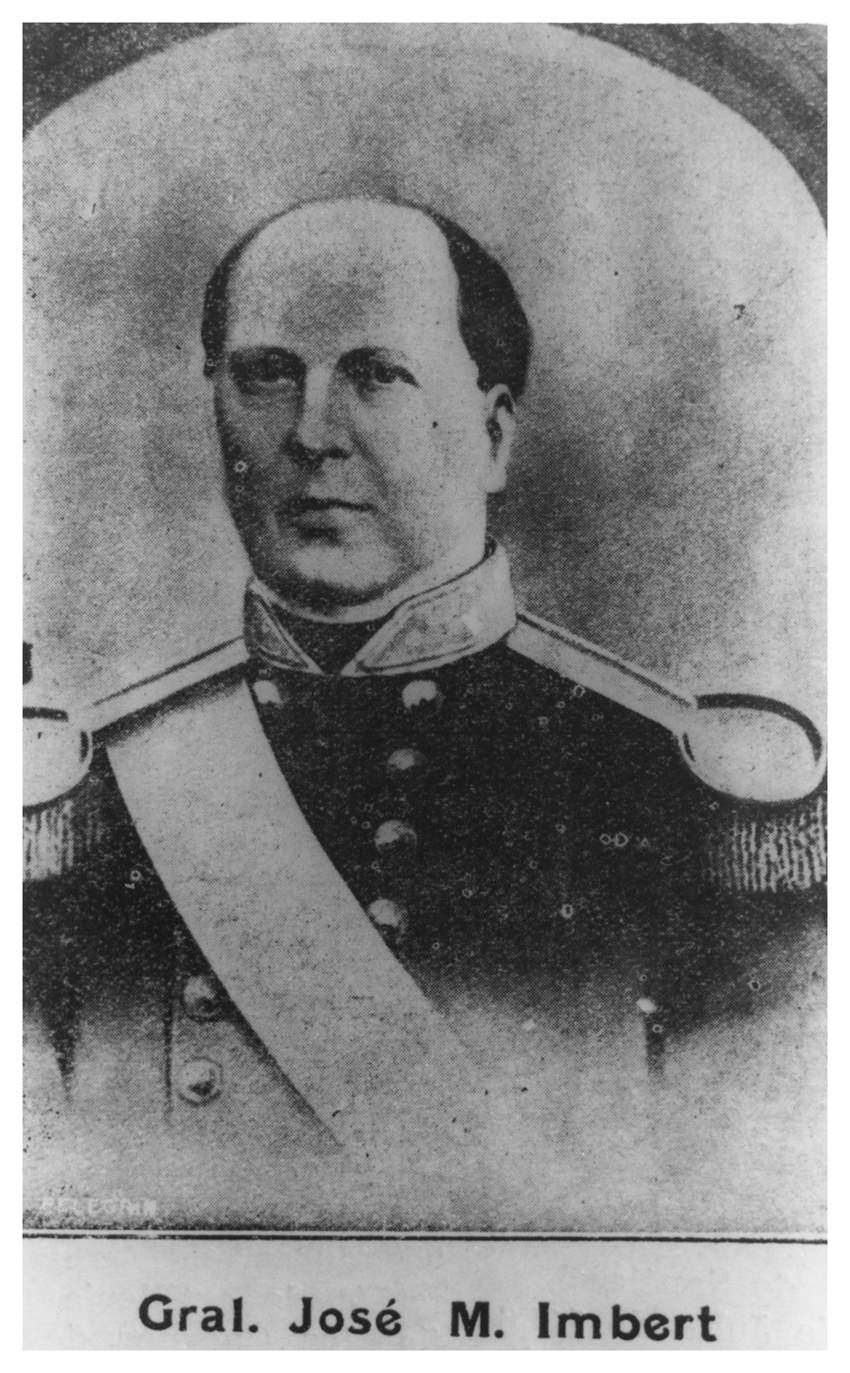
- Portrait of General Imbert, c. 1840s
- Born: Joseph Marie Barthélemy Imbert; August 24, 1798; Le Plessis-Grammoire, France
- Died: May 14, 1847 (aged 49) Puerto Plata, Dominican Republic
- Allegiance: Dominican Republic
- Branch: Dominican Army
- Service years: 1844–1847
- Rank: General
- Conflicts: Dominican War of Independence
- Spouse: María Francisca del Monte Sánchez
- Children: 6

Divisional General José María Bartolomé Imbert Duplessis (né Joseph Marie Barthélemy Imbert; (August 24, 1798 – May 14, 1847) was a French-born Dominican military figure who was one of the early leaders of the Dominican War of Independence.

== Early life ==
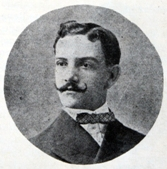
Imbert in his youth

José María Imbert was born as Joseph-Marie-Barthélemy Imbert in France, to Simon Imbert and Marie Anne du Plessis (from the house of the dukes of Richelieu) in Foudon, in the commune of Le Plessis-Grammoire, in the province of Maine-et-Loire, in the historical duchy of Anjou. From France, he moved to Cuba, then to Haiti and, definitively, he settled in the Dominican Republic, in the city of Moca, during the Haitian occupation. At that time he was mayor there. In Moca and married María Francisca del Monte Sánchez (1807–1876) and begat 6 children, among them, Segundo Imbert.

== Dominican War of Independence ==
He supported the independence movement, led by Juan Pablo Duarte, and formed a cell of La Trinitaria in Moca. From there he supported the cry of February 27, 1844 and Moca joined said movement. The Mocanos, led by José María Imbert, proclaimed Independence a few days after what happened at Puerta del Conde. He achieved the rank of General by his accumulated merits.He had even supported Duarte's proclamation as president by his supporters in Santiago.

=== Battle of Santiago ===
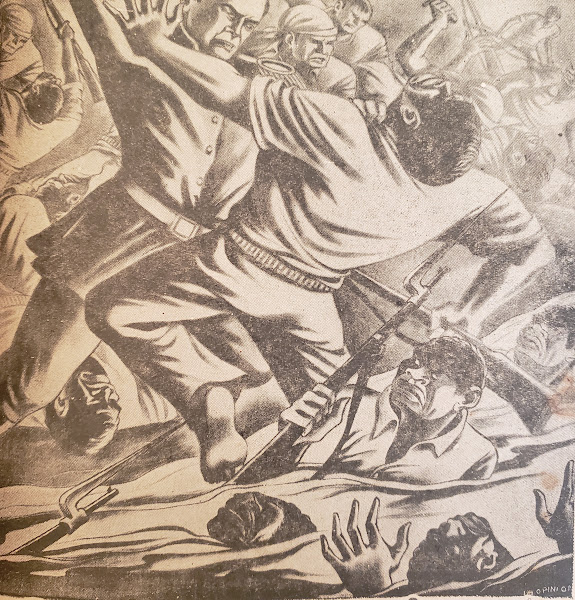
Illustration of Imbert in the Battle of Santiago, artwork by José Alloza.

At the beginning of March 1844, days after Dominican independence from Haiti had been declared, Matías Ramón Mella became the governor of the district of Santiago and the highest military authority of Cibao, appointing Imbert as his lieutenant. On March 29, 1844, the army of Haitian general Jean-Louis Pierrot was nearing Santiago. Mella recruited people for an improvised Dominican army to defend the country. Imbert managed the defense of the city with the help of Fernando Valerio, Ángel Antonio Reyes, and José María López. Imbert's role on the Battle of Santiago was crucial for the crushing victory over the Haitian Army. In 1845, Imbert being a lieutenant of Francisco Antonio Salcedo, he fought the Haitians in the Battle of Beler defeating them again.

== Death ==
Finished that campaign, he rejoined Moca, as Commander of Arms. From there he went to the same office at Puerto Plata, where he died on May 14, 1847.

His children, great-grandchildren and great-great-grandchildren would have a very notable participation in Dominican history. His son, Segundo Imbert, was a hero of the Dominican Restoration War and future Vice President of the Dominican Republic in 1887.

Segundo Imbert Barrera, his great-grandson, fought the Trujillo dictatorship and was involved in the Internal Front of Puerto Plata, in the invasion of Luperón, in 1949, chaired by Fernando Spignolio and Fernando Suárez. He has been a character little studied by our historians. He was vilely murdered by orders of, Ramfis Trujillo, the son of the dictator, after the assassination of Trujillo on 30 May 1961, in which his brother, Antonio Imbert Barrera, participated.

The Executive Branch ordered, through Decree No. 2140, of 1972, the transfer of the remains of General José María Imbert to the National Pantheon. Currenrly, He is buried at the Cathedral of Santiago, along with other heroes of the Independence and the Restoration Wars.

== See also ==
- Segundo Imbert
- Antonio Imbert Barrera
- Carmen Imbert Brugal
- José María Cabral (director)
- Furcy Fondeur
- Pedro Eugenio Pelletier
- Matías Ramón Mella
