= Rosa Montás de Duvergé =

Dominican independence activist (1813–1895)

Rosa Montás de Duvergé (1813 – October 19, 1895), also known by her alias Madame Bois, was a Dominican independence heroine and the wife of patriot General Antonio Duvergé.

Montás was born in 1813 and played a significant role in the Dominican War of Independence. Following the proclamation of the First Dominican Republic on February 27, 1844, her husband devoted himself entirely to the nation’s defense. Rosa Montás supported him throughout this period, often accompanying him during military campaigns.

In the southern regions, she witnessed key battles such as those at Ocoa, Las Matas, Cambronal, and the third confrontation at Cachimán. During these campaigns, Montás tended to wounded soldiers and provided logistical support, using her personal resources to supply rations to the troops stationed along the borders. On several occasions, she donated household items, including bedsheets, to be repurposed as bandages for the injured in the liberating army.

Following the execution of her husband in 1855 on the orders of President Pedro Santana, Montás relocated to Higüey, where she lived in poverty until her death on October 19, 1895. She died invalid and destitute in the home she had occupied since her husband's demise.

Rosa Montás was buried in the church of Higüey, though her grave remains unmarked, with no tombstone to honor her legacy.

== See also ==
- Antonio Duvergé
- Pedro Santana
- Dominican War of Independence
