= Battle of Cambronal =

1855 battle of the Dominican War of Independence

- Part of the Dominican War of Independence
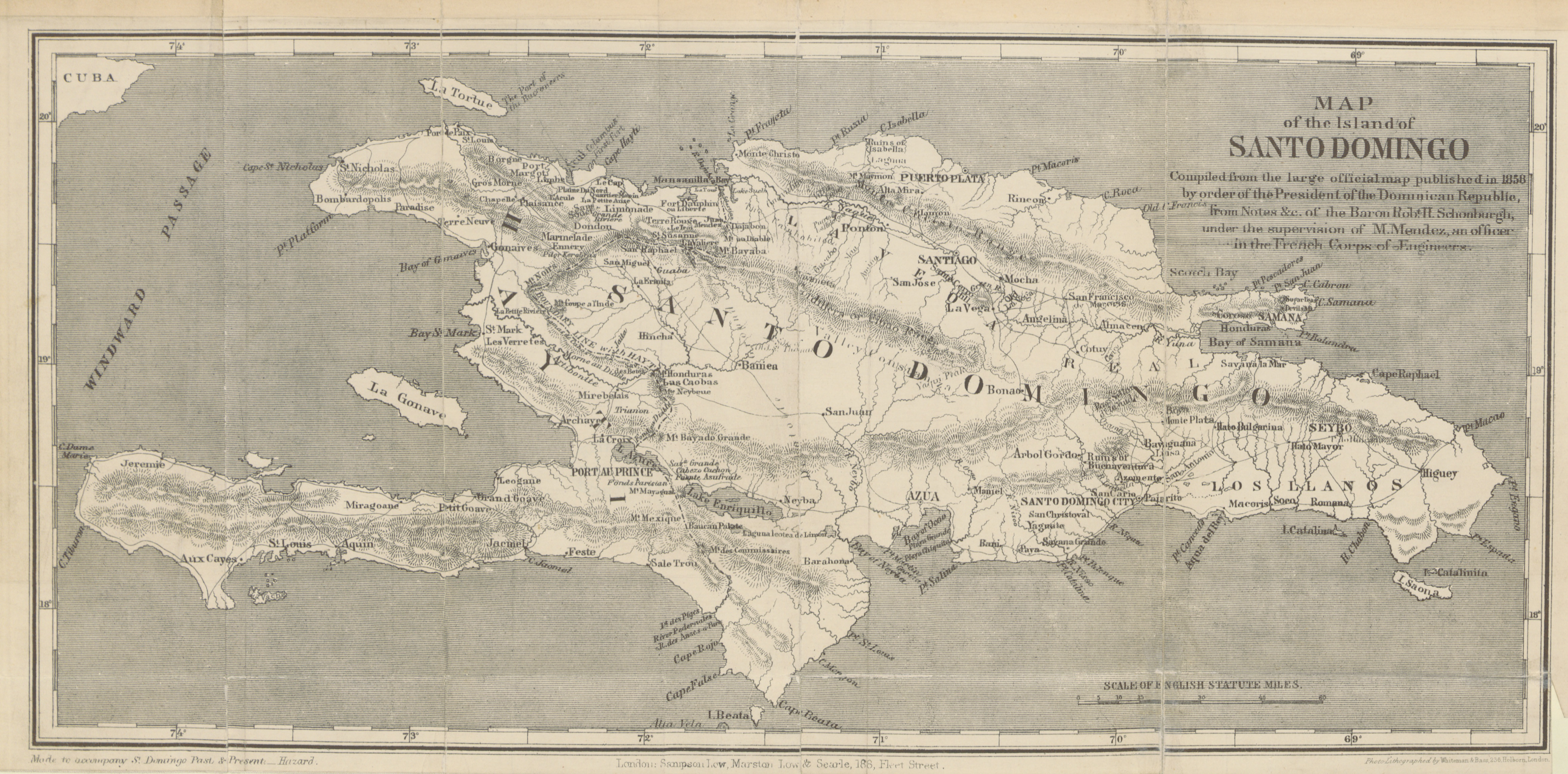
- Map of the Hispaniola (1873)
Date	22 December 1855
Location	Cambronal, nearby Neiba
Result	Dominican victory

Belligerents
Dominican Republic	Haiti

Commanders and leaders
(Dominican Republic) Francisco Sosa	(Second Empire of Haiti) Pierre Rivere Garat †

Strength
400 militia	6,000 regulars

The Battle of Cambronal (Spanish: Batalla de Cambronal) was a major battle during the years after the Dominican War of Independence and was fought on 22 December 1855, in Cambronal, near Neiba. A detachment of Dominican troops forming part of the Army of the South, led by General Francisco Sosa, defeated an outnumbering Haitian force led by General Pierre Rivere Garat.
