= Battle of Fort Cachimán =

Dominican War of Independence battle, 1844

- Part of the Dominican War of Independence
Date	6 December 1844
Location	Fort Cachimán, Haiti
Result	Dominican victory

Belligerents
Dominican Republic	Haiti

Commanders and leaders
Gen. Antonio Duvergé; Gen. Juan Contreras	(Haiti) Unknown

Strength
Unknown	2,000+

Casualties and losses
Unknown	300+ killed; 1 cannon captured

The Battle of Fort Cachimán took place during the Dominican War of Independence, on December 4, 1844. The fighting was concentrated at the border of Haiti and the Dominican Republic, between the present-day provinces of Elías Piña, Dominican Republic, and Belladère, Haiti. A force of Dominican troops, led by Antonio Duvergé Duval, defeated an outnumbering force of the Haitian Army and captured the Haitian fort at Cachimán. Three hundred Haitians and an unknown number of Dominicans were killed during the confrontation.

After the Dominicans seized the fort, they set up an advance post under the command of Juan Evangelista Batista.

== Background ==
The Haitian army had invaded the Spanish side of the island of Hispaniola in 1822 and abolished slavery there. The island remained under a under a unified government, led by Jean-Pierre Boyer, for more than two decades, between 1822-1843, when Boyer lost support of the elite and was ousted from power. The following year, on February 27, 1844, the Dominican Republic, under the leadership of Juan Pablo Duarte, Francisco del Rosario Sánchez, and Matías Ramón Mella, declared independence.

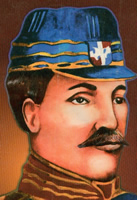
Antonio Duvergé

== Leadership of Antonio Duvergé ==
Antonio Duvergé Duval, born in Puerto Rico to a Spanish family, was a member of the secret society La Trinitaria. He was recognized for his tactical prowess in battle, and after his victory at Cachimán and his subsequent victory at the Battle of Estrelleta, he was promoted to the rank of divisional general. He is considered a national hero in the Dominican Republic.

== Alleged disrepair of the fort ==
In 2019, Adriano Sanchez Roa, Senator for the province of Elías Piña, where Fort Cachimán is located, alleged that the fort had fallen into disrepair, and that Haitian nationals had constructed residences near the site of the emblematic Dominican victory. He presented a bill asking the Dominican government to improve conditions at the site, and among other things, raise Dominican flags there.
