= Battle of Azua =

1844 battle of the Dominican War of Independence

Coordinates: 18°27′36″N 70°44′24″W

Battle of March 19
- Part of the Dominican War of Independence
Date	19 March 1844
Location	Azua de Compostela, Azua Province
Result	Dominican victory

Belligerents
Dominican Republic	Haiti

Commanders and leaders
Gen. Pedro Santana; Gen. Antonio Duvergé	(Haiti) Gen. Charles Rivière-Hérard (Haiti) Gen. Souffrand

Strength
2,200 regulars 2 artillery pieces	10,000 regulars

Casualties and losses
2 killed, 3 wounded	1,000 killed

The Battle of Azua or March 19 (Spanish: Batalla de Azua, Batalla del 19 de Marzo) was the first major battle of the Dominican War of Independence and was fought on the 19 March 1844, at Azua de Compostela, Azua Province. A force of some 2,200 Dominican troops, a portion of the Army of the South, led by General Pedro Santana and General Antonio Duvergé defeated an outnumbering force of 10,000 troops of the Haitian Army led by General Souffrand.

== Background ==
After the Dominican Declaration of Independence on February 27, 1844, a Provisional Government Board was established, composed of a mix of liberals but dominated by conservative elements. Among the key decisions, Pedro Santana, a cattle rancher from the El Seibo region, was chosen to command the southern army and defend the city of Azua, despite having no prior military experience.

Meanwhile, the Haitian president Charles Rivière-Hérard organized an army of approximately 30,000 men, dividing it into three columns to invade Dominican territory. The first contingent, led by General Jean-Louis Pierrot with 10,000 men, was to advance from the north, aiming to take Santiago and Puerto Plata. The second front, personally led by Hérard, headed south with the goal of capturing San Juan and Azua, while the third column, commanded by General Souffront, was tasked with taking Neiba and joining Hérard in Azua.

== Prelude ==
Before the Battle in Azua, a few skirmishes meant to slow down the Haitians took place: on March 13, during the Battle of Rodeo, Dominican forces led by General Fernando Tavera, successfully repelled a Haitian column commanded by the Haitian president Charles Hérard, although Tavera was wounded and replaced by Vicente Noble and Dionisio Reyes.

On March 18, skirmishes on Cabeza de Las Marías and Las Hicoteas took place, where Dominican forces, under the command of Manuel de Regla Mota, faced a much larger Haitian army led by General Souffront. While Mota was forced to retreat at Cabeza de Las Marías, the Dominicans managed to hold their ground and slow down the southernmost column led by Souffront so he couldn't make it to Azua at the same time as Herard.

== The Battle ==
This text is based on a summary by Francisco Elpidio Beras in Clío magazine issues 118-119, drawing from accounts by French consul Mr. Juchereau de Saint-Denys, Dominican historian José Gabriel García, and Haitian sources Thomas Madiou and Dontelas-Dorval:

At dawn on March 19, the town, wrapped in great silence, awaited the Haitian assault. The Haitians began their attack shortly after sunrise, led by General Thomas Hector, with remarkable bravery and vigor, through the San Juan road entrance. However, they were caught off guard by deadly shrapnel fire from a 24-pound cannon that had been well-hidden in that direction, along with gunfire from concealed riflemen, halting their advance with significant losses.

The right flank of the Haitian force was severely weakened by accurate rifle fire from nearby woods, prompting them to try and dislodge the sharpshooters. They moved to the right along the Los Conucos road and succeeded in their goal, only to retreat in disorder after being ambushed near the old Las Mercedes convent by another hidden cannon, this time of smaller caliber. Despite suffering considerable casualties, including many dead and wounded, the courage of their general and other officers encouraged them to launch a second assault. The battle soon spread across the entire western side of the plaza, now including the area near the Barro road.

After around three hours of intense fighting, the Haitians withdrew under the orders of President Charles Hérard. They were pursued by a few riflemen under General Pedro Santana, all the way to the Jura River, where they entrenched themselves, taking their wounded and leaving about 50 dead soldiers on the battlefield.

General Pedro Santana, along with his daring officers, such as Antonio Duvergé, Feliciano Martínez, Manuel Mora, Juan Esteban Ceára, José Leger, Vicente Noble, Marco de Medina, and others, including Francisco Sone and José del Carmen García, who directed cannon fire, played key roles in the battle.

The Haitian attacking force consisted of a squadron of national guardsmen from Puerto Republicano, along with the Presidential Guard's grenadiers and hunters, and the 99th and 190th Line Regiments. Of the 1,500 men under Santana's command, only 800 engaged in the action, and their losses were minimal.

== Aftermath ==
On the night of March 19 to 20, Santana abandoned the battlefield and retreated to Sabana Buey, then shortly afterward to Baní, where he established his headquarters. Before leaving, he ensured the advanced positions at El Número, El Memizo, and El Maniel were well defended, as these were possible routes the enemy might use on their march toward Santo Domingo.

On the 21st, Herárd entered the town after being informed by a woman returning from a pilgrimage that the population had abandoned it. He took possession of the town, buried his dead after cremating them, and seized the abandoned cannons, some militia, dry provisions, and large amounts of sugar in barrels. Only two inhabitants remained in the village: one was mad, and the other was elderly. He also seized some livestock.

The Haitian President then held a large review at the "Champ de Mars." After reading the daily order at the Altar of the Fatherland, he addressed the army in these terms (as seen in the works of Dorvelas-Dorval and Madiou): "Soldiers, I count on your courage and the honor that binds you to your banners. Azua opens the gates to Santo Domingo. You will march with me to that rebellious city, where the old bands of the North will drive back the insurgents, deaf to the voice of fraternity. Swear to me that you will not return to your homes until you have subdued the wicked who conspire against the children of Haiti."

The Haitians spent the following weeks in Azua, using the time to regroup and fortify their position. They awaited the arrival of additional resources, including reinforcements, ammunition, and supplies, which were crucial for their continued efforts.
