= Battle of Beler =

- Part of the Dominican War of Independence
- Monte Cristi Province
Date	27 October 1845
Location	Beler savanna, Monte Cristi Province
Result	Dominican victory

Belligerents
Dominican Republic	Haiti

Commanders and leaders
Gen. Francisco Antonio Salcedo; Lt. José María Imbert; Adm. Juan Bautista Cambiaso	(Haiti) Gen. Jean-Louis Pierrot (Haiti) Gen. Seraphin †

Strength
3 schooners (Separación Dominicana, María Chica, and Leonor)	Unknown

Casualties and losses
16 killed 25–30 wounded	350 killed 10 captured

The Battle of Beler (Spanish: Batalla de Beler) was one of the major battles of the Dominican War of Independence and was fought on the 27 October 1845 at the Beler savanna, Monte Cristi Province. A force of Dominican troops, a portion of the Army of the North, led by General Francisco Antonio Salcedo, defeated a force of the Haitian Army led by General Jean-Louis Pierrot, while 3 Dominican schooners led by Admiral Juan Bautista Cambiaso, blockaded the port of Cap-Haïtien to prevent sea reinforcements of the near sited land battle.
