= Battle of El Número =

1849 battle of the Dominican War of Independence

Coordinates: 18°27′36″N 70°44′24″W

- Part of the Dominican War of Independence
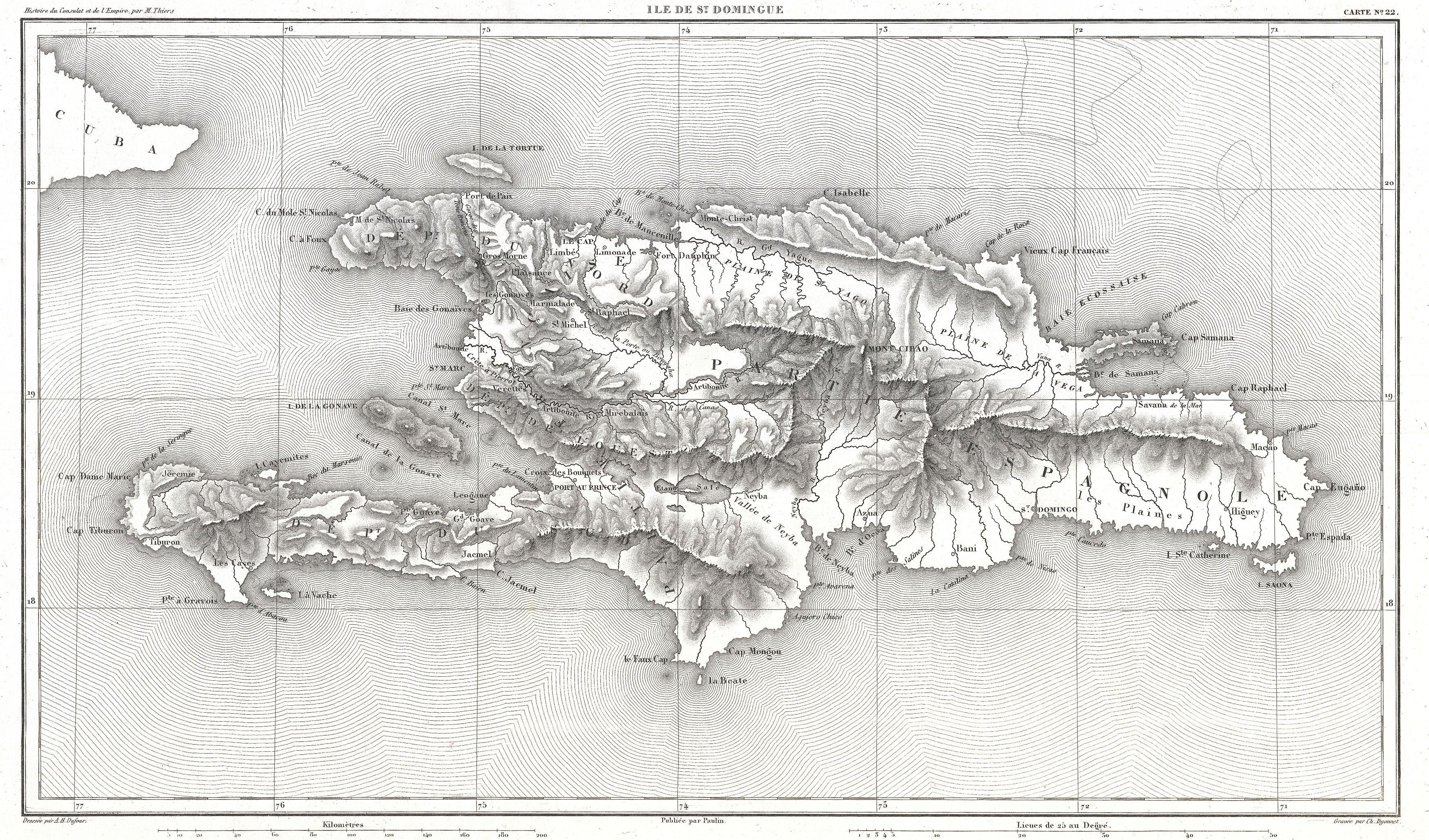
- Map of Hispaniola (1859)
Date	17 April 1849
Location	Nearby Azua de Compostela, Azua Province
Result	Dominican victory

Belligerents
Dominican Republic	Haiti

Commanders and leaders
(Dominican Republic) Gen. Francisco Domínguez (Dominican Republic) Gen. Antonio Duvergé	(Republic of Haiti (1820–1849)) Faustin Soulouque (Republic of Haiti (1820–1849)) Gen. Jean Francois Jeannot

Strength
300 riflemen	10,000 regulars

The Battle of El Número (Spanish: Batalla del Número) was a battle during the years after the Dominican War of Independence and was fought on 17 April 1849, nearby Azua de Compostela, Azua Province. A force of 300 Dominican troops, a portion of the Army of the South, led by General Francisco Domínguez and General Antonio Duvergé defeated an outnumbering force of 10,000 Haitian troops led by General Jean Francois Jeannot.

== Bibliography ==
- Scheina, Robert L. (2003). Latin America's Wars. Potomac Books.
- Authors, Multiple (2013). Imperial Wars 1815–1914. Amber Books Ltd. ISBN 9781782741251.
