= Battle of Cabeza de Las Marías =

1844 battle of the Dominican War of Independence (1844-1856)

Skirmishes near Cabeza de Las Marías and Las Hicoteas
- Part of the Dominican War of Independence
- Azua Province
| Date | 13–18 March 1844 |
| Location | Cabeza de Las Marías, near Neyba, Baoruco Province - Las Hicoteas, near Azua de Compostela, Azua Province |
| Result | Haitian victory |

Belligerents
| Dominican Republic | Haiti |

Commanders and leaders
| Gen. Manuel de Regla Mota; Gen. José María Cabral | (Haiti) Gen. Souffrand (Haiti) Col. Auguste Brouard |

Strength
| 500 (estimated) | 10,000 (estimated) |

Casualties and losses
| Unknown | Unknown |

The Battle of Cabeza de Las Marías and Las Hicoteas (Spanish: Batalla de Cabeza de Las Marías y Las Hicoteas) were the first military engagements of the Dominican War of Independence and were fought between the 13 and 18 March 1844, at Cabeza de Las Marías, near Neyba, Baoruco Province and Las Hicoteas, near Azua de Compostela, Azua Province. A force of roughly 500 Dominican troops, a portion of the Army of the South, led by General Manuel de Regla Mota, encountered an outnumbering force of roughly 10,000 troops of the Haitian Army led by General Souffrand and was routed, fleeing to Azua de Compostela.
