= Battle of Las Carreras =

1849 Battle of the Dominican War of Independence

Coordinates: 18°17′24″N 70°19′48″W

- Part of the Dominican War of Independence
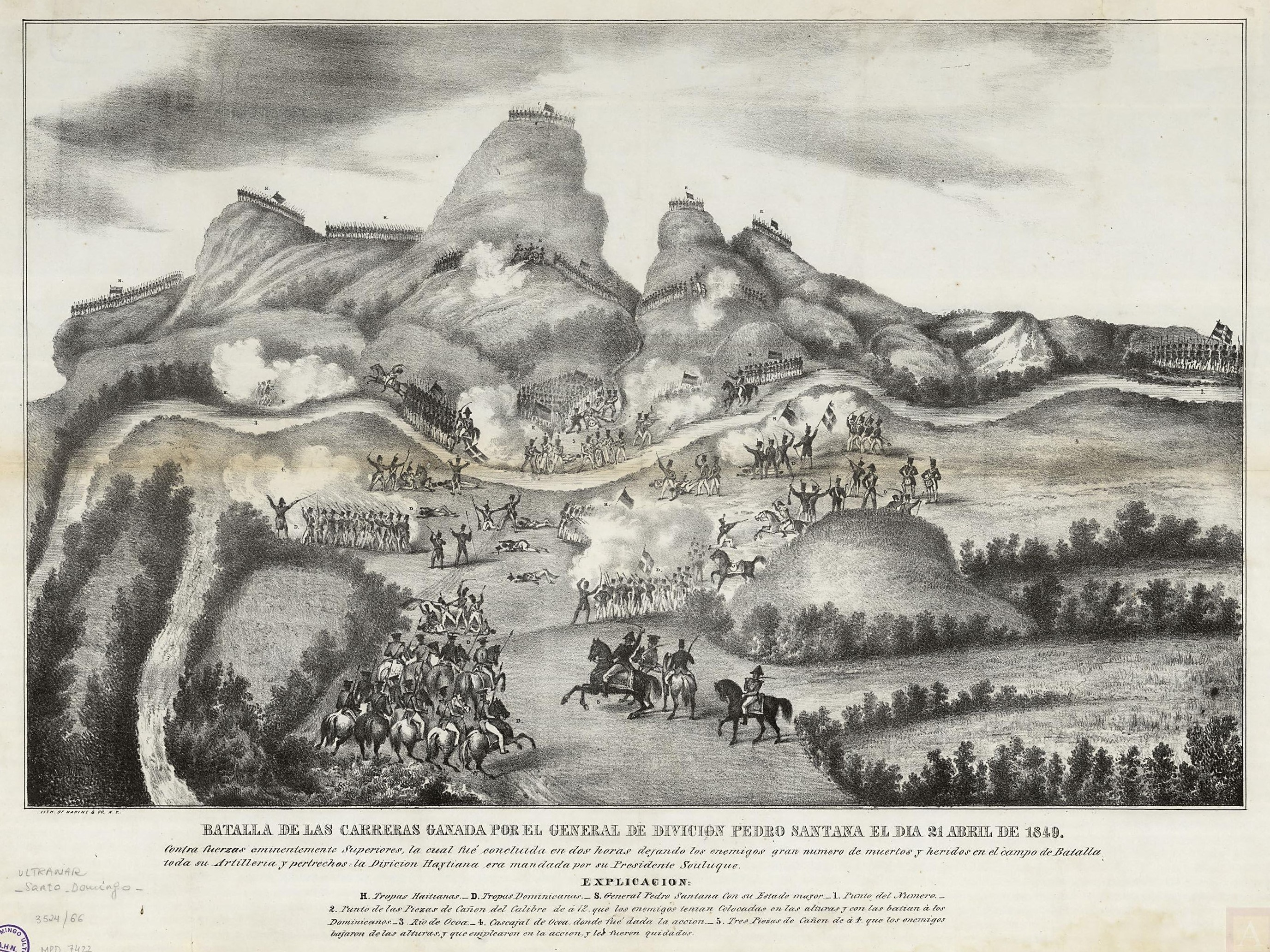
- Depiction of the Battle of Las Carreras
| Date | 21–22 April 1849 |
| Location | Nearby Baní, Peravia Province |
| Result | Dominican victory |

Belligerents
| Dominican Republic | Haiti |

Commanders and leaders
| (Dominican Republic) Gen. Pedro Santana (Dominican Republic) Gen. Antonio Duvergé (Dominican Republic) Gen. Francisco del Rosario Sánchez (Dominican Republic) Gen. Matías Ramón Mella | (Republic of Haiti (1820–1849)) Faustin Soulouque |

Strength
| 400–800 militia 1 field gun | 10,000–18,000 regulars 7 artillery pieces |

Casualties and losses
| Minimal | 500+ killed (Note: Over 500 Haitians were killed in the battles of El Número and Las Carreras.); 7 artillery pieces captured |

The Battle of Las Carreras (Spanish: Batalla de Las Carreras) was a major battle during the years after the Dominican War of Independence and was fought on the 21–22 April 1849, nearby Baní, Peravia Province. A force of 800 Dominican troops, a portion of the Army of the South, led by General Pedro Santana, defeated an outnumbering force of 10,000 troops of the Haitian Army led by Faustin Soulouque.

== Battle ==
The battle opened with a cannon barrage and devolved into hand-to-hand combat. As the remnants of the Haitian army retreated along the southern coastal road, they were under fire from a small Dominican squadron. Haitian strategy was ridiculed by the American press:

[At the first encounter] ... a division of negro troops of Faustin ran, and their commander, Gen. Garat, was killed. The main body, eighteen thousand troops, under the Emperor, encountered four hundred Dominicans with a field piece, and notwithstanding the disparity of force, the latter charged and caused the Haytiens to flee in every direction ... Faustin came very near falling into the enemy's hands. They were once within a few feet of him, and he was only saved by Thirlonge and other officers of his staff, several of whom lost their lives. The Dominicans pursued the retreating Haytiens some miles until they were checked and driven back by the Garde Nationale of Port-au-Prince, commanded by Robert Gateau, the auctioneer.

== Bibliography ==
- Clodfelter, Micheal (2017). Warfare and Armed Conflicts: A Statistical Encyclopedia of Casualty and Other Figures, 1492–2015 (4th ed.). McFarland.
- Scheina, Robert L. (2003). Latin America's Wars. Potomac Books.
- Authors, Multiple (2013). Imperial Wars 1815–1914. Amber Books Ltd. ISBN 9781782741251.
