= Battle of Estrelleta =

1845 battle of the Dominican War of Independence

Coordinates: 18°53′N 71°42′W

- Part of the Dominican War of Independence
- Elías Piña Province
Date	17 September 1845
Location	Estrelleta, Elías Piña Province
Result	Dominican victory

Belligerents
Dominican Republic	Haiti

Commanders and leaders
Gen. Antonio Duvergé; Gen. José Joaquín Puello	(Haiti) Gen. Jean-Louis Pierrot

Casualties and losses
3 wounded	Unknown number of killed & wounded 2 artillery pieces captured

The Battle of Estrelleta (Spanish: Batalla de la Esrelleta) was a major battle of the Dominican War of Independence and was fought on September 17, 1845, at the site of Estrelleta, near Las Matas de Farfán, San Juan Province. A force of Dominican troops, a portion of the Army of the South, led by General Antonio Duvergé, defeated an outnumbering force of the Haitian Army led by General Jean-Louis Pierrot.

== Prelude ==
=== Campaign of 1845 ===
On June 17, 1845, the Dominicans, under the command of General Antonio Duvergé, invaded Haiti in retaliation for Haitian border raids. The invaders captured two towns on the Plateau du Centre and established a bastion at Cachimán. Haitian President Jean-Louis Pierrot quickly mobilized his army and counter-attacked on July 22, driving the invaders from Cachimán and back across the frontier. On August 6, Pierrot ordered his army to invade the Dominican Republic.

== Battle ==
On September 17, 1845, the Dominicans defeated the Haitian vanguard near the frontier at Estrelleta where the Dominican "square" repulsed, with the use of bayonets, a Haitian cavalry charge.

== Aftermath ==
On September 27, 1845, Dominican Gen. Francisco Antonio Salcedo defeated a Haitian army at the battle of "Beler," a frontier fortification. Salcedo was supported by Adm. Juan Bautista Cambiaso's squadron of three schooners, which blockaded the Haitian port of Cap-Haïtien. On October 28, other Haitians armies attacked the frontier fort "El Invencible" and were repulsed after five hours of hard fighting.
