= Dominican War of Independence =

1844–56 Dominican Republic war with Haiti

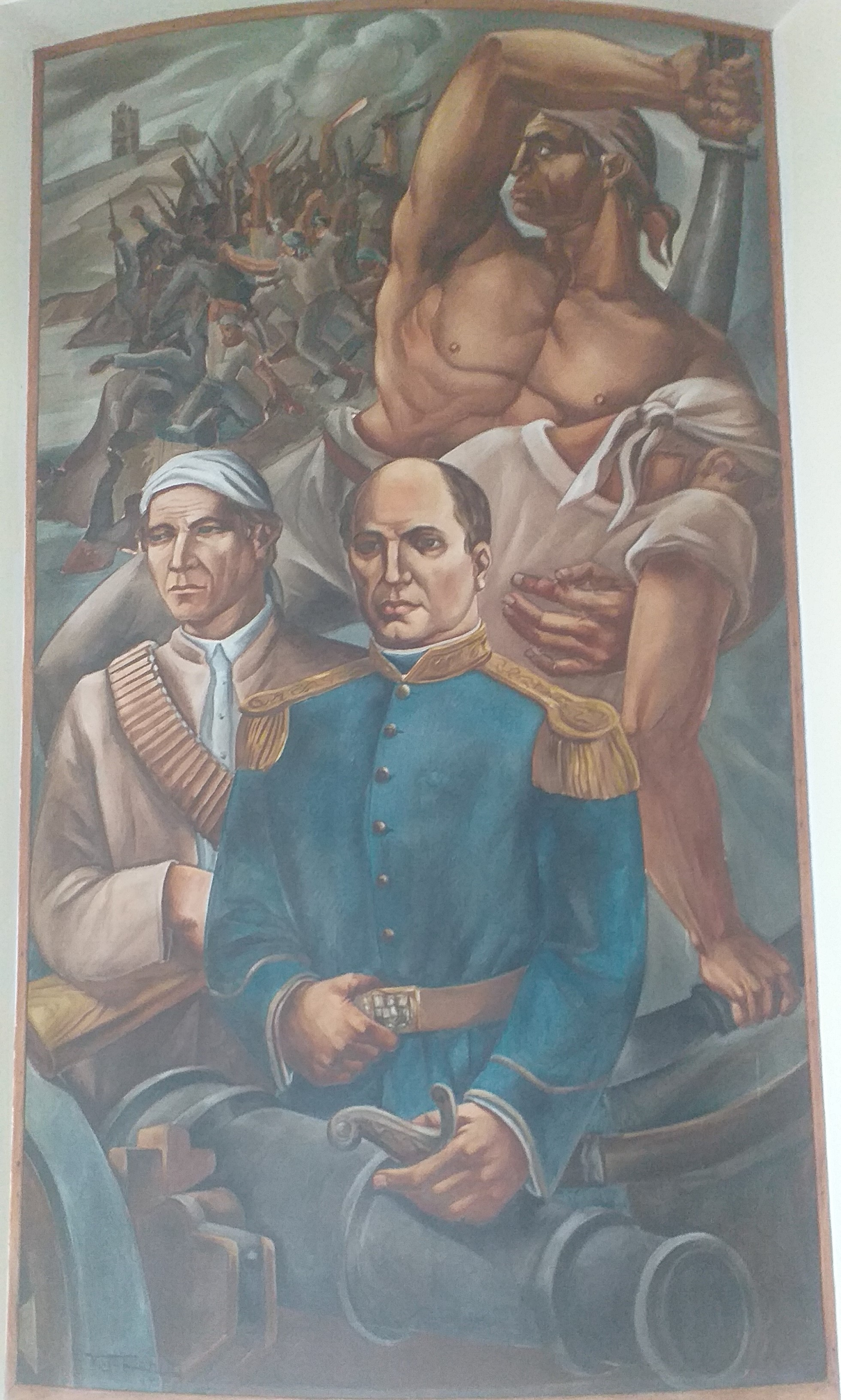
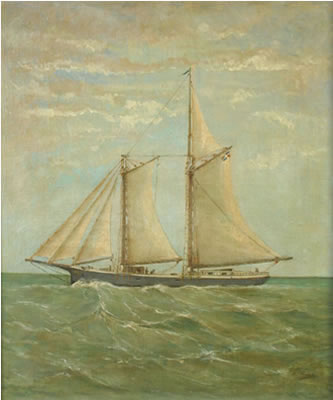
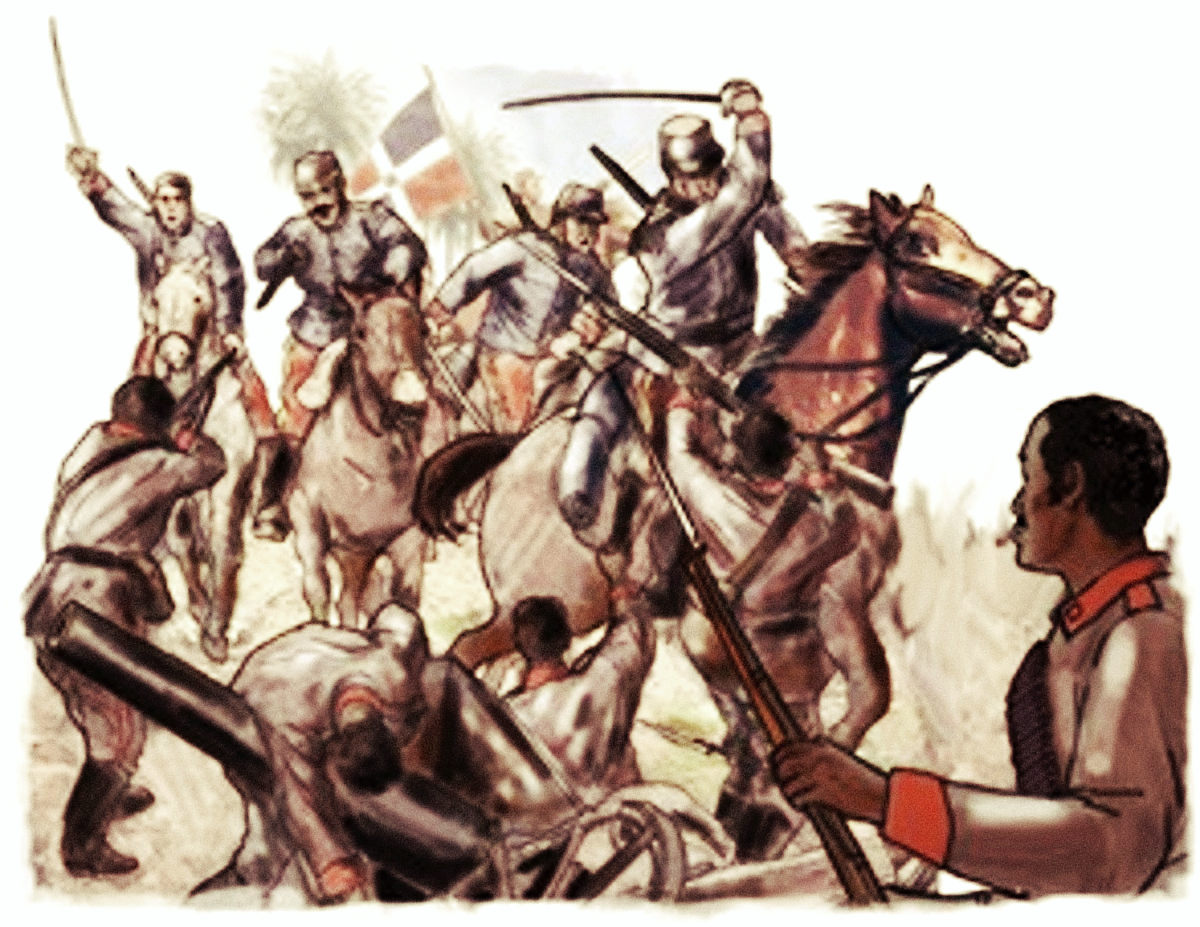
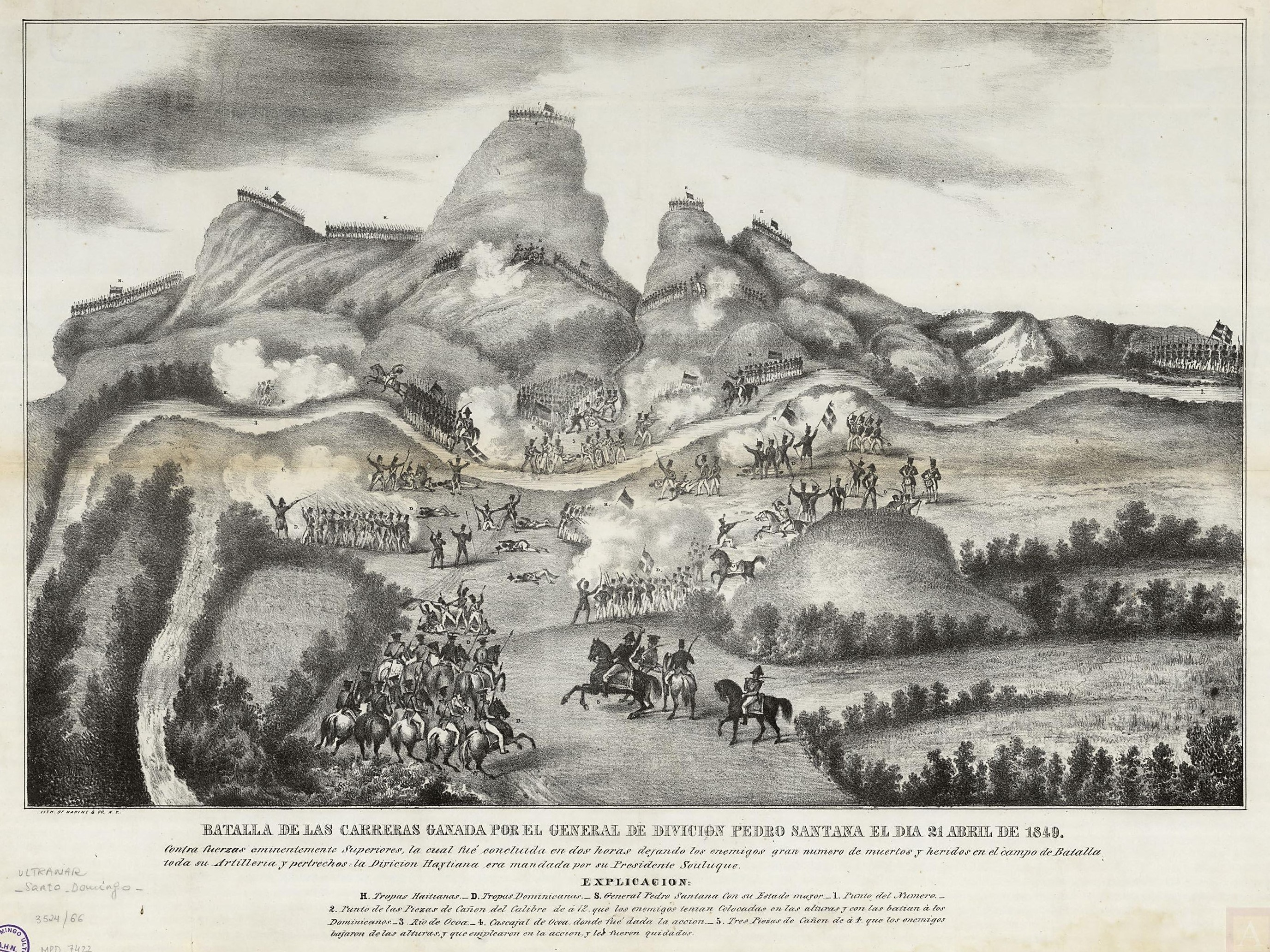
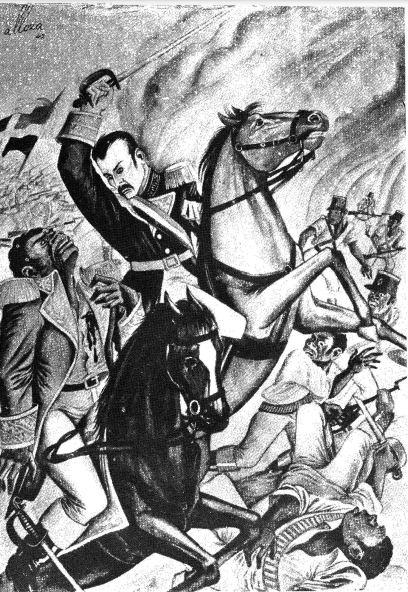
- Clockwise from top left: The Battle of March 30, The Dominican schooner Seperación Dominicana in the Battle of Tortuguero, Dominican forces charges at Haitian batallion, the Battle of Las Carreras, and the Battle of Santomé.
Date	27 February 1844 – 24 January 1856 (11 years, 10 months and 28 days)
Location	Hispaniola
Result	Dominican victory: Dominican Independence; Withdrawal of Haitian forces
Territorial changes	Separation of the Santo Domingo territory from Haiti: Reestablishment of the Dominican–Haitian border; Establishment of the First Republic; Dominican control of the larger east side of Hispaniola

Belligerents
Dominican Republic	Republic of Haiti (1844–1849); Second Empire of Haiti (1854–1856)

Commanders and leaders
Pedro Santana; Manuel Jiménes; Buenaventura Báez Juan Pablo Duarte; Francisco del Rosario Sánchez; Matías Ramón Mella; Antonio Duvergé; Juan B. Cambiaso; Juan Alejandro Acosta; Manuel Mota; José Mª. Cabral; José Mª. Imbert; J. J. Puello; Pedro E. Pelletier; Pedro Florentino; Fernando Valerio	(Haiti) Charles Hérard (Haiti) Jean-Louis Pierrot (Haiti) / (Second Empire of Haiti) Faustin (Haiti) Vicent Jean Degales † (Haiti) Pierre Paul (Haiti) Auguste Brouard (Haiti) Gen. Souffrand (Haiti) Gen. St.-Louis (Haiti) Jean Francois (Haiti) Gen. Seraphin † (Haiti) Gen. Garat †; Antoine Pierrot †; Pierre Rivere Garat †

Strength
15,000	30,000

Casualties and losses
- The exact number of casualties is unknown; however, Haiti is estimated to have lost twice as many troops as the Dominican Republic.

The Dominican War of Independence (Spanish: Guerra de Independencia Dominicana) was a war of independence that began when the Dominican Republic declared independence from the Republic of Haiti on February 27, 1844 and ended on January 24, 1856. Before the war, the island of Hispaniola had been united for 22 years when the newly independent nation, previously known as the Captaincy General of Santo Domingo, was unified with the Republic of Haiti in 1822. The criollo class within the country overthrew the Spanish crown in 1821 before unifying with Haiti a year later.

In March 1844, Haitian soldiers invaded the Dominican Republic at the behest of President Charles Rivière-Hérard, but withdrew within a month after logistical difficulties and effective Dominican resistance. A second Haitian campaign in 1845 ended with the retreat of the Haitian army across the Dajabón River. Three years later, Haiti's President Faustin Soulouque launched his first invasion of the Dominican Republic, but his army was beaten back by forces under General Pedro Santana. In late 1849, Dominican forces bombarded, sacked and burned several villages on the southern and western coasts of Haiti. In November 1855, Soulouque marched into the Dominican Republic at the head of another army, but the Haitians were decisively defeated and forced back across the border by January 1856. The frontier was not finalized until 1936, when the Dominican Republic formally relinquished its claims to the central border towns of Hinche, Las Caobas, San Miguel de la Atalaya and San Rafael de la Angostura.

== Background ==
In the late 18th century, the island of Hispaniola had been divided into two European colonies: Saint-Domingue in the west, governed by France; and Santo Domingo in the east, governed by Spain, occupying two-thirds of Hispaniola. By the 1790s, large-scale slave rebellions erupted in the western portion of the island, which led to the eventual removal of the French and the independence of Haiti in 1804. Following the independence of Haiti, massive portions of the remaining French population were murdered. The eastern portion of the island was preparing itself for an eventual separation from Spain.

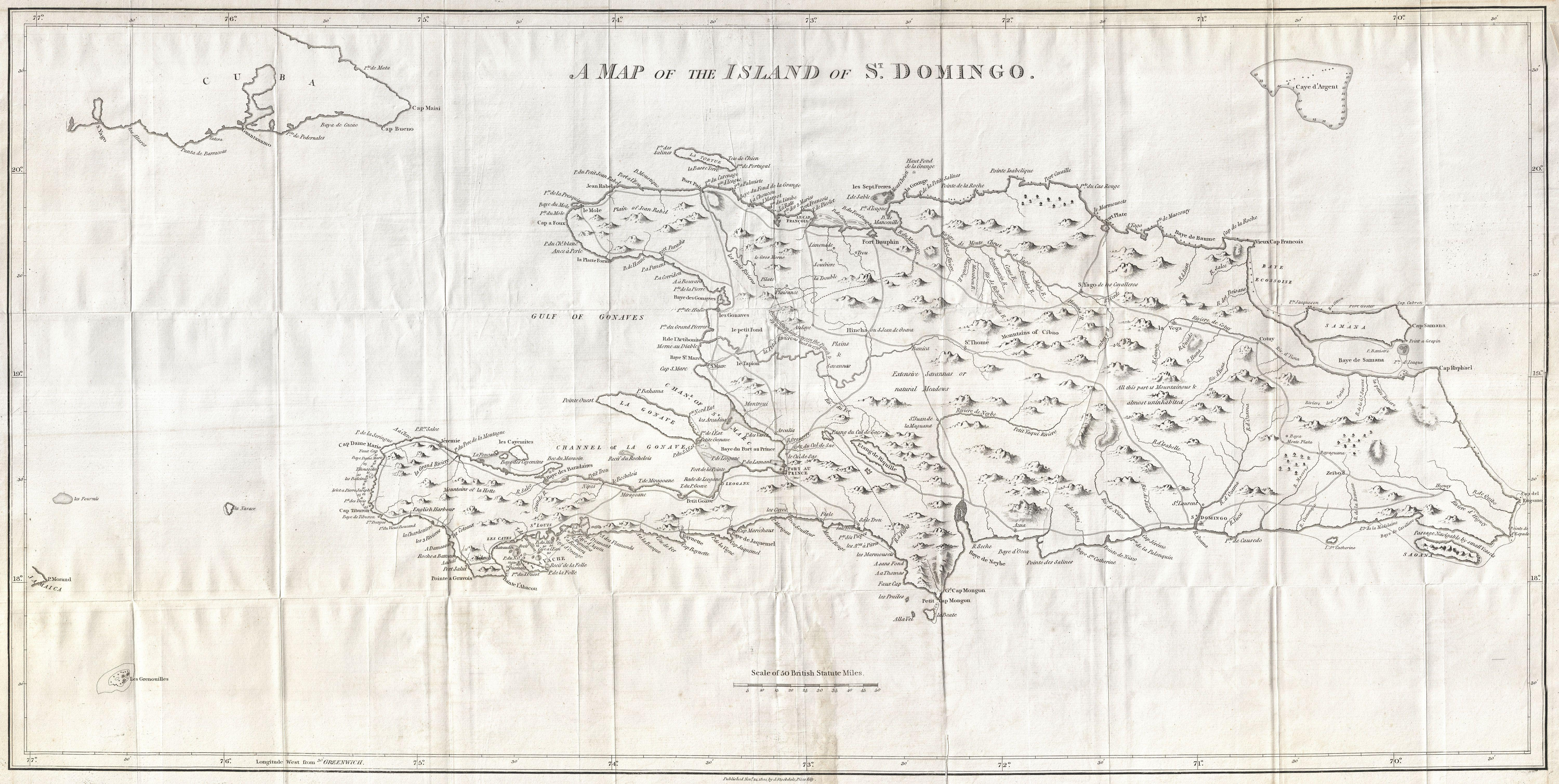
Map of the island of Hispaniola published by John Stockdale in 1800 showing the line of demarcation between French and Spanish portions of the island as defined in 1776. These divisions would later evolve into Haiti and the Dominican Republic as we know them today. Edwards further identifies the Mountains of Cibao, where Columbus famously sought for gold.

At the beginning of the 1800s, the colony of Santo Domingo, which had once been the headquarters of Spanish power in the New World centuries prior, was suffering an economic decline. Spain during this time was embroiled in the Peninsular War with Napoleon in Europe, and the various Spanish American wars of independence. With Spain's resources spread among its larger colonies, its Caribbean territories became relatively neglected. This period is referred to as the España Boba era. The island was suffering economically as the island had been damaged from wars against France.

The Captaincy General of Santo Domingo had approximately 80,000 inhabitants, with the majority being European descendants and mulattos. For most of its history Santo Domingo had an economy based on mining and cattle ranching. The population in the Spanish colony was significantly lower than the French side of the island, which had a population of nearly one million slaves before the Haitian Revolution.

=== First independence movement ===
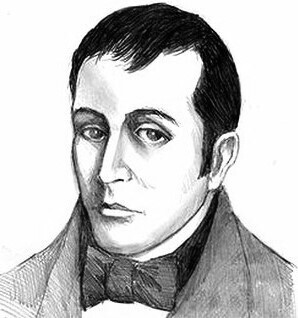
José Núñez de Cáceres

Santo Domingo was regionally divided with many rival and competing provincial leaders. During this period in time the Spanish crown wielded little to no influence in the colony. Some wealthy cattle ranchers had become rulers, and sought to bring control and order in the southeast of the colony where the "law of machete" ruled the land. On November 9, 1821 the former Captain general in charge of the colony, José Núñez de Cáceres, influenced by all the Revolutions that were going on around him, finally decided to overthrow the Spanish government and declared independence from Spanish rule, this would usher in an Ephemeral Independence.

== Unification of Hispaniola (1822–1844) ==
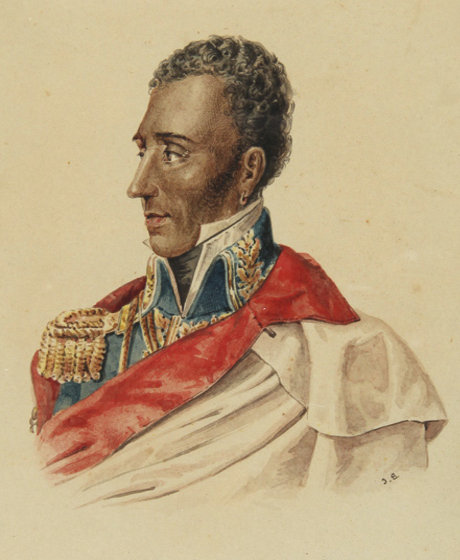
Jean-Pierre Boyer, the president of Haiti from 1818 to 1843

A group of Dominican politicians and military officers in the frontier region had expressed interest in uniting the entire island, while they sought power with military support from Haitian officials against their enemies.

Haiti's president, Jean-Pierre Boyer, a mulatto who was seen as an ally promised his full support to the frontier governors, and thus he ceremonially entered the country with around 10,000 soldiers in February 1822, after most of the cities and towns proclaimed their allegiance to Boyer between November 1821 and January 1822. On February 9, 1822, Boyer formally entered the capital city, Santo Domingo, where he was received by Núñez who offered to him the keys of the Palace. Boyer rejected the offer, while saying: "I have not come into this city as a conqueror but by the will of its inhabitants". The island was thus united from "Cape Tiburon to Cape Samana in possession of one government."

Eventually, the Haitian government became extremely unpopular throughout the country. The Dominican population grew increasingly impatient with Haiti's poor management and perceived incompetence, and the heavy taxation that was imposed on their side. The country was hit with a severe economic crisis after having been forced to pay a huge indemnity to France. A debt was accrued by Haiti in order to pay for their own independence from the European nation; this would give rise to many anti-Haitian plots.

=== Resistance ===
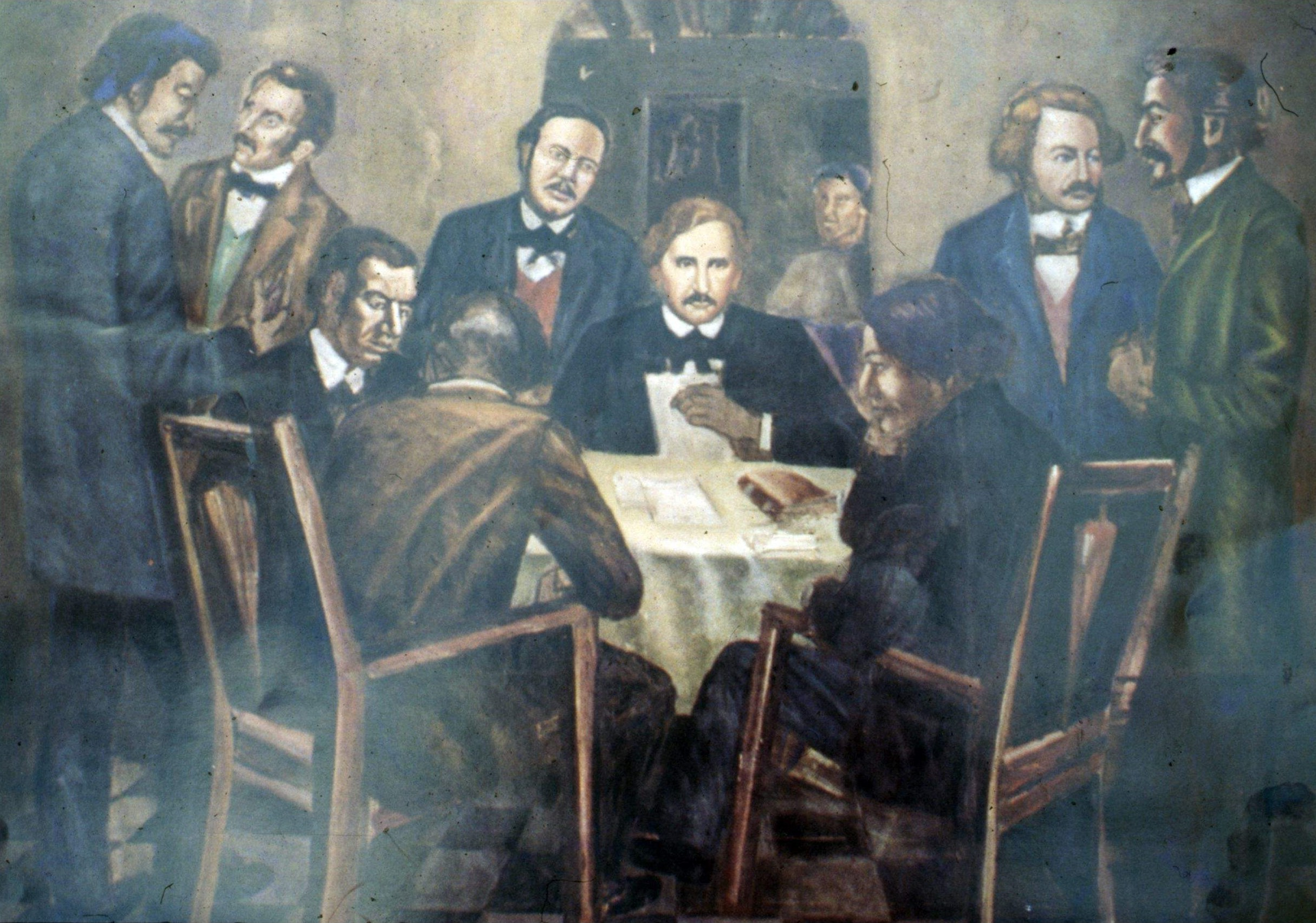
An assembly of the Trinitarios

In 1838, Juan Pablo Duarte, an educated nationalist, founded a resistance movement called La Trinitaria ("The Trinity") along with Ramón Matías Mella and Francisco del Rosario Sánchez. It was so named because its original nine members had organized themselves into cells of three. The cells went on to recruit as separate organizations, maintaining strict secrecy, with little or no direct contact among themselves, in order to minimize the possibility of detection by the Haitian authorities. Many recruits quickly came to the group, but it was discovered and forced to change its name to La Filantrópica ("The Philanthropic"). The Trinitarios won the loyalty of two Dominican-manned Haitian regiments.

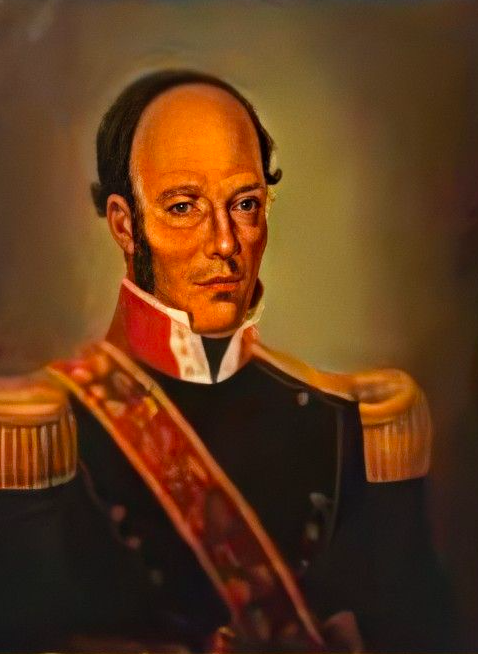
Charles Rivière-Hérard

In 1843, the revolution made a breakthrough: they worked with a liberal Haitian party that overthrew President Jean-Pierre Boyer. However, the Trinitarios' work in the overthrow gained the attention of Boyer's replacement, Charles Rivière-Hérard. Rivière-Hérard imprisoned some Trinitarios and forced Duarte to leave the island. While gone, Duarte searched for support in Colombia and Venezuela, but was unsuccessful. Upon returning to Haiti, Hérard, a mulatto, faced a rebellion by blacks in Port-au-Prince. The two regiments of Dominicans were among those used by Hérard to suppress the uprising.

In December 1843, the rebels told Duarte to return since they had to act quickly because they were afraid the Haitians had learned of their insurrection plans. When Duarte had not returned by February, because of illness, the rebels decided to take action anyway with the leadership of Francisco del Rosario Sánchez, Ramón Matías Mella, and Pedro Santana, a wealthy cattle-rancher from El Seibo who commanded a private army of peons who worked on his estates.

On February 27, 1844, some 100 Dominicans seized the fortress of Puerta del Conde in the city of Santo Domingo, and the following day the Haitian garrison surrendered. As these Haitian troops withdrew to the west side of the island, they pillaged and burned. In retaliation, Dominican gunboats bombarded Haitian ports.

Mella headed the provisional governing junta of the new Dominican Republic. On March 14, Duarte finally returned after recovering from his illness and was greeted in celebration. The population of the new republic stood at approximately 5,200 whites, 135,000 mulattoes, and 34,000 blacks.

== War of Independence ==
Map of the Dominican War of Independence

Despite the success of the revolt, the Dominican revolutionaries realized that the war for independence had only just commenced. The Haitian government refused to recognize the independence of the new nation, and for the next 12 years, launched at least several different invasions to regain control over the territory.

=== 1844: First campaign ===
On March 7, 1844, Haiti's President Hérard ordered a blockade of Dominican ports. Three columns of Haitian troops, totaling 30,000 men, were dispatched on the 10th: one toward Las Caobas under Hérard's command, another towards Neiba, and a third to Santiago and Puerto Plata. General Santana led his cowboys westward. Skirmishes followed, with Haitian forces winning most but suffering higher casualties. The Dominicans fought with stones, knives, machetes, lances, clubs, and rifles.

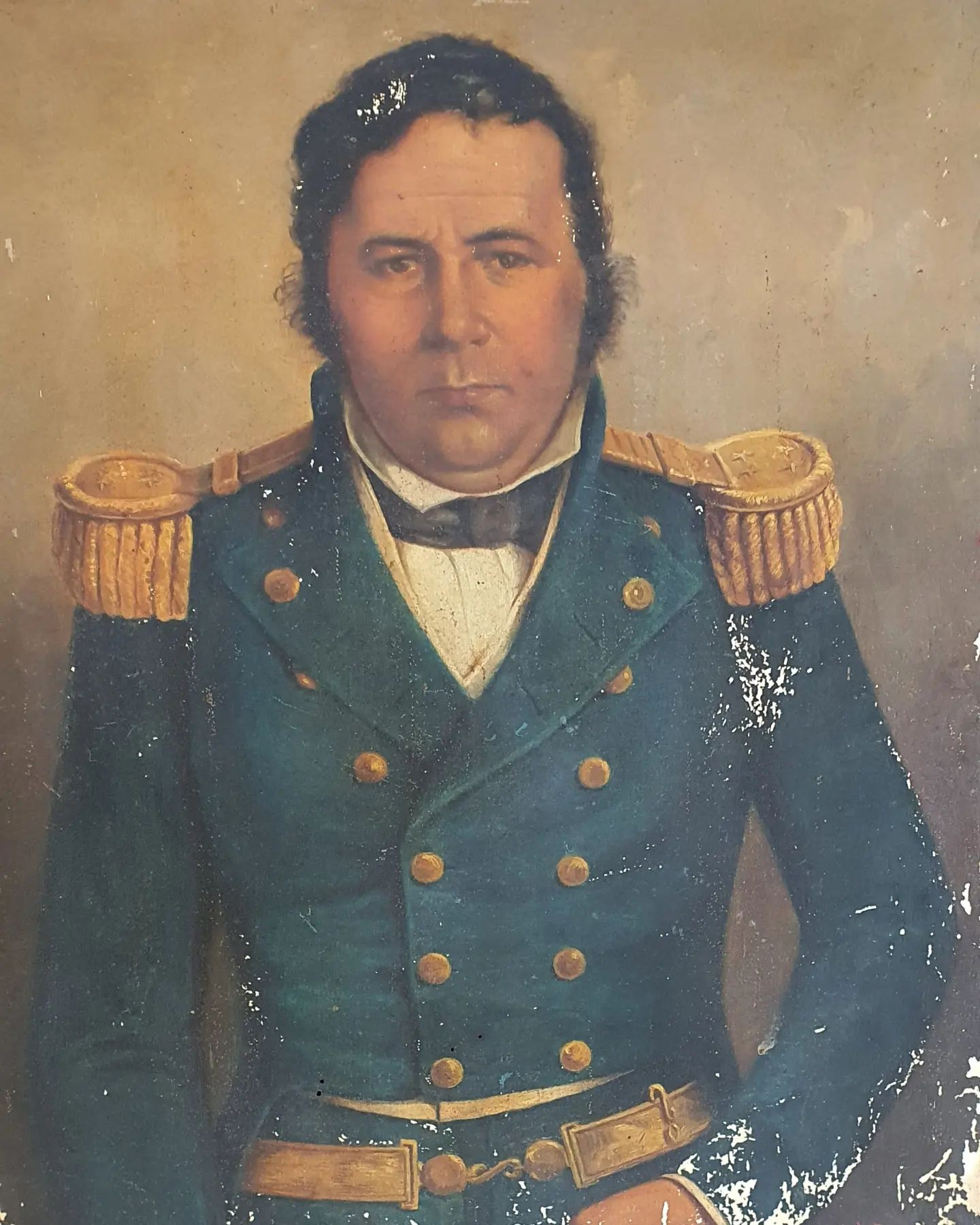
Pedro Santana

After Santana's victory at the Battle of Azua on March 19, he retreated, allowing Hérard's forces to occupy Azua. The Dominicans shifted their military operations to the Ocoa River and the valleys of Baní, where their cavalry and lancers could effectively operate. This hindered the Haitian advance beyond Azua. The Haitians sustained casualties in their attempts to advance through mountain passes and were repelled. In the north, heavily outnumbered Dominican troops, under the command of General José María Imbert, defeated Haitian troops led by General Jean-Louis Pierrot at the Battle of Santiago on March 30, thanks to a warning of the pending attack by an Englishman, Stanley Theodore Heneken. The Haitian column abandoned the field of battle the following day, and during its retreat was harassed, resulting in additional casualties. Meanwhile, in the south, the Haitian column at Azua, unable to advance and suffering constant casualties, also retreated to Port-au-Prince. As the Haitians retreated, they laid waste to the land. The Dominicans' effective use of artillery fire on the field of battle enabled them to defeat the Haitians with minimal casualties.

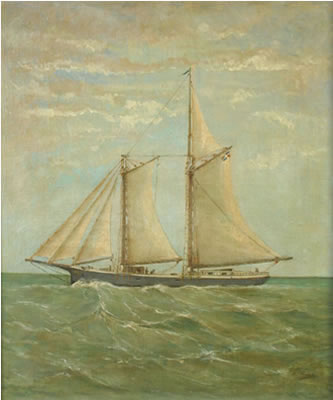
Schooner "Separación Dominicana" during the Battle of Tortuguero

At sea, the Dominican schooners Maria Chica (3 guns), commanded by Juan Bautista Maggiolo, and the Separación Dominicana (5 guns), commanded by Juan Bautista Cambiaso, defeated a Haitian brigantine Pandora (4 guns) plus schooners Le signifie and La Mouche off the coast of Azua on April 15, sinking all three enemy ships and killing all the Haitian sailors without losing any of their own ships.

As a result of these successive Haitian defeats, Hérard was ousted on May 3, leading to the temporary suspension of Haitian military operations. Santana's forces captured Santo Domingo on July 12 and proclaimed Santana as the ruler of the Dominican Republic. Consequently, the Trinitarios were ousted from power.

=== 1845: Second campaign ===
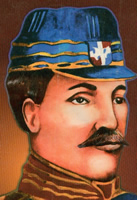
General Antonio Duvergé

A year later, on June 17, 1845, a small Dominican detachment from Las Matas, under the command of General Antonio Duvergé, invaded Haiti, capturing four enemy trenches and killing over 100 Haitian troops at the cost of only 2 killed. The invaders captured two towns on the Plateau du Centre and established a bastion at Cachimán. Haitian President Jean-Louis Pierrot quickly mobilized his army and counterattacked on July 13, resulting in over 200 casualties on the Haitian side, while the Dominican forces were able to repulse the attack without suffering any casualties. On July 22, the Haitian forces launched another attack on the Dominican stronghold at Fort Cachimán. The Haitians were repulsed after a battle that lasted three and a half hours, in which the Dominicans only suffered seven casualties. But the arrival of Haitian reinforcements soon compelled the Dominicans to retreat back across the frontier.

On August 6, Pierrot ordered his army to invade the Dominican Republic. A member of La Trinitaria, José María Serra, claimed that over 3,000 Haitian soldiers and less than 20 Dominican militias had been killed at this point. On September 17, 1845, the Dominicans defeated the Haitian vanguard near the frontier at Estrelleta where the Dominican square repulsed, with the use of bayonets, a Haitian cavalry charge. On September 27, 1845, Dominican General Francisco Antonio Salcedo defeated a Haitian army at the Battle of Beler, a frontier fortification. Salcedo was supported by Admiral Juan Bautista Cambiaso's squadron of three schooners, which blockaded the Haitian port of Cap-Haïtien. Among the dead were three Haitian generals. On October 28, other Haitian armies attacked the frontier fort "El Invencible" and were repulsed after five hours of hard fighting. In a significant naval action, a Dominican squadron captured 3 small Haitian warships and 149 crew off Puerto Plata on December 21. On January 1, 1846, Pierrot announced a new campaign. However, on February 27, when he ordered his troops to march against the Dominicans, the Haitian army mutinied, resulting in his overthrow. The war had become highly unpopular in Haiti, therefore, Jean-Baptiste Riché, Pierrot's successor, was unable to organize another invasion.

=== 1849: Third campaign ===
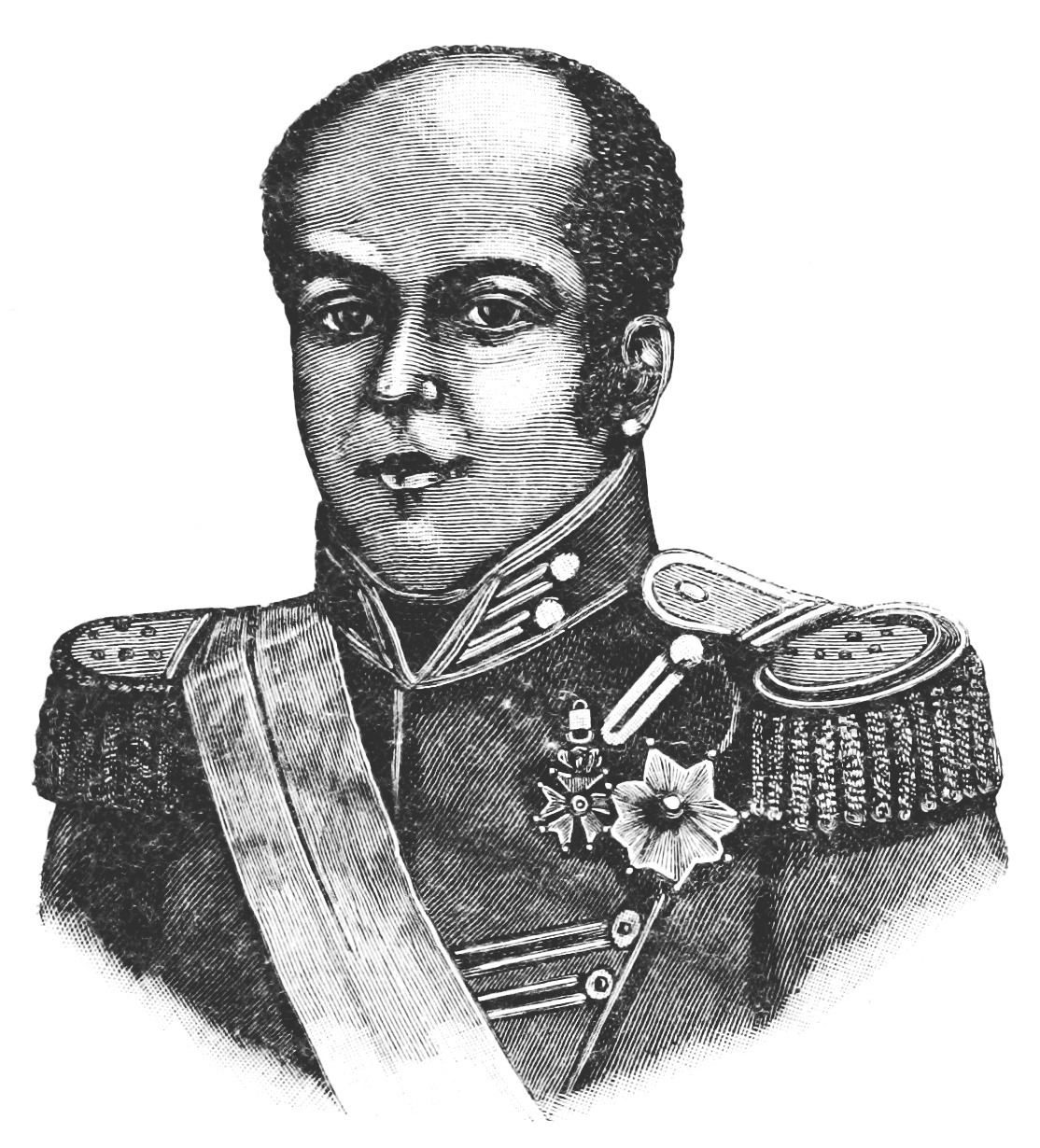
Faustin Soulouque

On March 9, 1849, Haiti's President Faustin Soulouque of Haiti led 10,000 troops in an invasion of the Dominican Republic. The Haitians attacked the Dominican garrison at Las Matas. According to historian Robert L. Scheina, "The demoralized defenders offered almost no resistance and abandoned their weapons." The Haitian army continued their campaign against the Dominicans, capturing and burning the town of Azua. Dominican General (and presidential contender) Santana raised 800 soldiers and, with the help of several gunboats, routed the Haitian invaders at the Battle of Las Carreras on April 21–22. The battle opened with a cannon barrage and devolved into hand-to-hand combat.

In November 1849, Dominican President Buenaventura Báez launched a naval offensive against Haiti to forestall the threat of another invasion. A Dominican squadron composed of the brigantine 27 de Febrero and schooner Constitución and commanded by Captain Charles J. Fagalde, a Frenchman, appeared off the Haitian coast, taking prizes. On November 4, the squadron bombarded the village of Anse-à-Pitres with 50 cannonballs before disembarking a landing party and seizing booty. The next day, the Dominican ships bombarded Les Cayes, captured a schooner and sank some small craft. Fagalde wanted to sail up the Windward Passage between Haiti and Cuba in search of more prizes. However, the Dominican crews mutinied so Fagalde returned to the port of Santo Domingo. On November 8, Soulouque declared the Dominicans pirates, but possessing no naval force at that time he could do little else.

Following a Haitian rejection of a Dominican peace proposal, Báez dispatched a second naval expedition against Haiti. On December 3, 1849, the squadron composed of the brigantines 27 de Febrero and General Santana and the schooners Constitución and Las Mercedes and commanded by Juan Alejandro Acosta, bombarded and burned the town of Petit Rivière. The Dominicans also captured Dame-Marie on the west coast of Haiti, which they plundered and set on fire. On December 5, Dominican and Haitian flotillas encountered each other off Les Cayes, but a storm broke up the battle and forced the Dominican flotilla to return to Santo Domingo.

=== 1851–1856: Diplomatic intervention and Fourth campaign ===
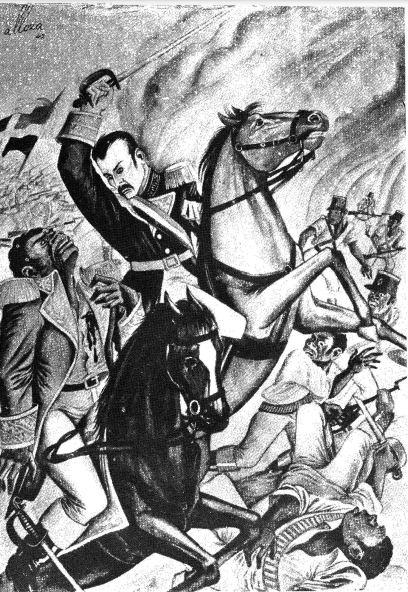
Battle of Santomé illustration

As the fighting disrupted maritime commerce, the major naval powers became involved. In 1851, a truce was mediated by the United Kingdom, France, and the United States. By late 1854, the Hispaniolan nations were at war again. In November, 2 Dominican ships captured a Haitian warship and bombarded two Haitian ports. In November 1855, Soulouque, having proclaimed himself Emperor Faustin I of a Haitian empire which he hoped to expand to include the Dominican Republic, invaded his neighbor again, this time with an army of 30,000 men marching in three columns. But again the Dominicans proved to be superior soldiers, defeating Soulouque's army, which vastly outnumbered them.

In the south, 4,500 Dominicans led by José María Cabral defeated 12,000 Haitian troops on December 22, 1855, at the Battle of Santomé. The Haitians lost 695 men, including General Antoine Pierrot. On the same day another force of 400 Dominicans defeated 6,000 Haitian troops at the Battle of Cambronal. The Dominicans achieved a subsequent victory over a Haitian contingent of 6,000 soldiers in Ouanaminthe, resulting in the deaths of over 1,000 Haitians, with numerous others wounded and reported missing during their return to the capital. On January 27, 1856, some 8,000 Dominicans defeated 22,000 Haitians at the Battle of Sabana Larga near Dajabón after eight hours of fighting which came down to hand-to-hand combat. Thousands of dead or dying were abandoned on the battlefield. Upon Soulouque's arrival in Port-au-Prince with the remaining remnants of his army, he faced vehement curses from women who had lost their sons, brothers, and husbands in the war. Nevertheless, he succeeded in securing for Haiti possession of Lascahobas and Hinche.

== Aftermath ==
Dominican forces were able to defeat another Haitian invasion in 1859, but the country was in ruins economically and the constant threat of renewed Haitian invasion led Pedro Santana to annex the Dominican Republic to Spain in 1861. The annexation led to a guerrilla war between Dominican nationalists and Spanish forces beginning in August 1863, though Dominican forces also fought conventionally, such as in the Battle of La Canela. The war proved costly for Spain, with 10,888 soldiers killed or wounded over the course of the conflict and 9,000 dead from yellow fever by March 1864. Spain spent over 33 million pesos on the war and withdrew its forces in 1865. Dominican losses were 4,000 dead among nationalist forces and 10,000 casualties among the pro-Spanish militia under Santana. The Dominican Restoration War forced Haiti to realize that the goal of conquering the Dominican Republic was unattainable, and it finally recognized its independence in 1867.

No one has estimated the loss of lives and property incurred during the decades of fighting for independence by the Dominicans against France, Spain, Haiti, and then Spain again. To this day, the bitterness held by the Dominicans toward the Haitians suggests that during the fighting between them the loss of life and destruction of property were severe.

== Battles ==
Battles of the Dominican War of Independence
Battle	Date	Location	Dominican casualties	Haitian casualties	Result
Battle of Azua	March 19, 1844	Azua	5 dead or wounded	300+ dead or wounded Another estimate: 1,000+ dead	Dominican victory
Battle of Santiago	March 30, 1844	Santiago	1 wounded	600+ dead	Dominican victory
Battle of El Memiso	April 13, 1844	Azua	n/a	n/a	Dominican victory
Battle of Tortuguero	April 15, 1844	Azua	None	3 ships sunk	Dominican victory
Battle of Fort Cachimán	December 6, 1844	Haiti	n/a	300+	Dominican victory
Battle of Estrelleta	September 17, 1845	Elías Piña	3 wounded	n/a	Dominican victory
Battle of Beler	November 27, 1845	Monte Cristi	16 dead 25–30 wounded	350 dead 10 prisoners	Dominican victory
Battle of El Número	April 19, 1849	Azua	n/a	n/a	Dominican victory
Battle of Las Carreras	April 21, 1849	Ocoa	n/a	500+ dead	Dominican victory
Battle of Santomé	December 22, 1855	San Juan	n/a	695 dead	Dominican victory
Battle of Cambronal	December 22, 1855	Neiba	n/a	350 dead	Dominican victory
Battle of Sabana Larga	January 24, 1856	Dajabón	236 dead	Thousands dead	Dominican victory
