= Charles Rivière-Hérard =

President of Haiti from 1843 to 1844

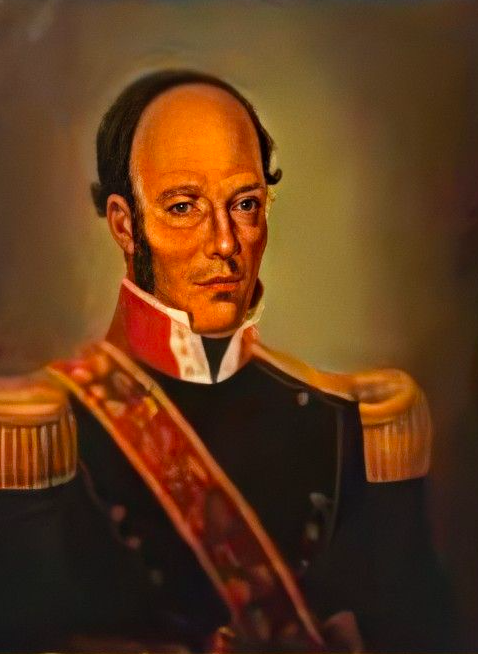

3rd President of Haiti
- In office 4 April 1843 – 3 May 1844
- Preceded by: Jean-Pierre Boyer
- Succeeded by: Philippe Guerrier

Personal details
- Born: 16 February 1789 Port-Salut, Saint-Domingue
- Died: 31 August 1850 (aged 61) Kingston, British Jamaica
- Profession: Military (divisional general)

Charles Rivière-Hérard (French pronunciation: [ʃaʁl ʁivjɛʁ eʁaʁ]; 16 February 1789 – 31 August 1850) also known as Charles Hérard aîné (French pronunciation: [ʃaʁl eʁaʁ ɛne], Charles Hérard eldest) was an officer in the Haitian Army under Alexandre Pétion during his struggles against Henri Christophe. He was declared the president of Haiti on 4 April 1843. He was forced from office by revolutionaries on 3 May 1844.

== Early life ==
Charles Rivière-Hérard was born in Port-Salut on 16 February 1789. Little about his early life is generally known, except that he fought with the revolutionaries against the French, and that he was an officer commanding a battalion of black troops, probably later in his military career.

== Presidency ==
Hérard was chief among the conspirators who ousted President Jean-Pierre Boyer during the Reform Revolution. On 30 December of that same year, a Provisional Parliament of Haiti enacted a new Constitution, apparently without Hérard's approval. Soon afterward, General Hérard, who had the loyalty of the army, seized control of the government and declared himself President of Haiti.

=== Dominican War of Independence ===
Soon after Hérard's rise to power, the eastern half of Haiti, which at that time was Santo Domingo, staged a revolt. On 27 February 1844, Dominican rebels, led by Francisco del Rosario Sánchez and Matías Ramón Mella, occupied the capital city of Santo Domingo and the following day declared the independence of the Dominican Republic from Haiti. Hérard responded almost immediately. In March 1844, the Dominican Republic was invaded through its eastern and northern frontiers by two Haitian army corps of more than 10,000 men; that of the west commanded by Hérard arrived at Azua, where was posted the advance guard of the Dominicans under General Pedro Santana, consisting of about 3,000 men with 3 cannons. The battle took place 19 March, and ended in victory for the Dominicans, repelling their enemy with the loss of only 2 killed and 3 wounded, while more than 1,000 Haitians remained dead on the field. After this decisive victory, the Dominicans withdrew their headquarters to the River Ocoa, and the valleys of Baní, where their cavalry and lancers could operate; and in this way they restrained the march of the aggressors, who could not advance beyond Azua; and having then attempted to open a way through the passes of the Maniel, they were in every re-encounter driven back with loss.

The other Haitian army in the north, commanded by General Pierrot, appeared on 30 March near the city of Santiago de los Caballeros, where the Haitians were also repulsed. Musket and cannon fire accounted for 600 Haitian dead; the Dominicans suffered only 1 wounded. This army abandoned the field of battle on the following day, and during its retreat was incessantly harassed and pursued experiencing in this way additional losses. The Haitian army at Azua, having failed in all its attempts to penetrate through the mountain passes, and suffering constant losses, likewise retreated to Port-au-Prince; committing before its departure the infamous act of burning the houses at Azua. In retaliation, Dominican gunboats bombarded Haitian coastal cities.

Facing increasing opposition in the government and a rapidly deteriorating political situation within the country, on 30 March 1844 Hérard dissolved the new Constitution and the Parliament.

=== Overthrow ===
During Hérard's invasion of the Dominican Republic, an armed revolt began in the Haitian countryside. By the end of March 1844, a rebel army composed of peasants and farmers began to muster near the city of Les Cayes on the southwest peninsula. The rebels, known as piquets, were armed with long pikes (from which they derived their name). Gathering under the command of a General Jean-Jacques Acaau, they formed what became known as "L’Armée Souffrante" or the Army of the Sufferers. In April of that year, they met and defeated a government army, although soon after this, their advance on the Haitian capital was checked at the town of Aquin.

This however, did not provide a respite for Hérard. While General Acaau was marching against Port-au-Prince in the south, an armed revolt had begun in the North, fueled by Hérard's opponents in the government. Faced with this crisis, Hérard relinquished the Presidency on 3 May 1844. He went into exile on 2 June 1844, resettling in Jamaica, where he died on 31 August 1850.

Political offices
Preceded by Jean-Pierre Boyer; President of Haiti	President of Haiti; 1843–44	Succeeded by Philippe Guerrier; President of Haiti
