= Jean-Louis Pierrot =

President of Haiti from 1845 to 1846

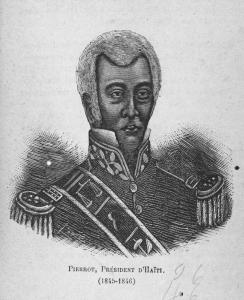

5th President of Haiti
- In office 16 April 1845 – 1 March 1846
- Preceded by: Philippe Guerrier
- Succeeded by: Jean-Baptiste Riché

Prince of Hayti
- Tenure; 28 March 1811 – 18 October 1820

Personal details
- Born: 19 December 1761 Acul-du-Nord, Saint-Domingue
- Died: 18 February 1857 (aged 95) Acul-du-Nord, Haiti
- Spouse(s): Cécile Fatiman, Louisa Genevieve Coidavid
- Children: Princess Marie Louise Amelia Pierrot Alexis

Jean-Louis Michel Paul Pierrot, Baron Pierrot, Prince Pierrot of Hayti (French pronunciation: [ʒɑ̃ lwi miʃɛl pɔl pjɛʁo]; 19 December 1761 – 18 February 1857) was a career officer general in the Haitian Army who also served as President of Haiti from 16 April 1845 to 1 March 1846.

== Revolution ==
During the Haitian Revolution Pierrot led a black battalion at the Battle of Vertieres in 1803. During the period of the Kingdom of Haiti, Henri Christophe (Henry I) promoted Pierrot to the rank of Lieutenant General in the Army and granted him the hereditary title of Baron and Prince of Hayti. During the period of the Second Empire of Haiti, Faustin Soulouque (Faustin I) promoted Pierrot to the rank of the Grand Marshal of the Empire.

== President ==
Pierrot was elected president of Haiti by the Council of State on 16 April 1845, the day after the death of Philippe Guerrier. As President of Haiti, he was intended to be a figurehead for the mulatto ruling class. Pierrot's most pressing duty as the new president was to check the incursions of the Dominicans, who were harassing the Haitian troops along the borders. Dominican boats were also making depredations on Haiti's coasts. President Pierrot decided to open a campaign against the Dominicans, whom he considered merely as insurgents. Haitians, however, were not inclined to go to war with their neighbors, and were unwilling to support the President's views.

Furthermore, Pierrot had displeased the army by conferring military rank on the leaders of the peasants of the Sud department and on many of their followers. In addition, the inhabitants of the towns of this department felt uneasy regarding the tendencies of Pierrot, who had appointed Jean-Jacques Acaau, the radical of Cayes, as Commandant of the Anse-à-Veau Arrondissement. Fearing a peasant revolt, the townsmen decided to divest Pierrot of his office. In consequence, on 1 March 1846, General Jean-Baptiste Riché was proclaimed President of the Republic at Port-au-Prince. On that same day, Pierrot resigned and retired to his plantation called Camp-Louise, where he led a quiet and peaceful life.

== Death ==
Pierrot died on 18 February 1857.

Pierrot's daughter, Marie Louise Amélia Célestine (Princess Pierrot), in 1845 married Lieutenant-General Pierre Nord Alexis, a provincial governor under Emperor Faustin I, who later became Haitian Minister for War from 1867 to 1869 and president of Haiti from 1902 to 1908.

Political offices
Preceded by Philippe Guerrier	President of Haiti; 1845–1846	Succeeded by Jean-Baptiste Riché
