= José Cabrera (soldier) =

Dominican activist (1810–1884)

José Cabrera Gómez (1810 – March 14, 1884) was a Dominican soldier and politician who was a prominent figure in the Dominican War of Independence and the Dominican Restoration War. In the latter conflict, he was one of the leaders behind the Grito del Capotillo, which triggered the start of the war against the Kingdom of Spain. In his later years, he became involved in the fight against the United States in the Six Years' War.

== Early life ==
He was born in 1810, during the early years of España Boba. Some historians, like Manuel Rodríguez Objío, place his birthplace in Dajabón, and others in Higüerito, near Sabaneta. He was the son of Agustín Cabrera and Juliana Gómez.

He was a soldier of the Dominican War of Independence, after which he retired from military activities until the 1860s.

== Restoration War ==
In exile, he was one of the first to oppose the proclaimed Annexation to Spain in 1861 by Pedro Santana. On June 1 of that same year, he joined Francisco del Rosario Sánchez, who at the head of an expedition entered Dominican territory crossing through Hondo Valle, Vallejuelo and El Cercado. Knowing the border regions, Cabrera facilitated communication between Sánchez and General Santiago Rodríguez Masagó, who kept abreast of the expedition's plans and was willing to offer his support. After failure of the expedition, Cabrera managed to save his life almost by miracle and took refuge in Haiti.

In April 1862, he crossed the border again from La Vissite and Ouanaminthe into Dominican territory to fight for the reconquest of independence. He was pursued to the hill of David by General Campillo, the sadistic executioner of the inhabitants of La Línea, but he managed to elude his pursuers. He did not accept the amnesty granted by the Spanish regime and remained in Dominican territory with his closest comrades in arms, Gume Fortuna and Pablo Reyes, as well as a small number of combatants with the intention of harassing the colonialists, while they established contact with the group commanded by Masagó, Pedro Antonio Pimentel and Benito Monción who planned the resumption of the war from Haiti.

When Lucas de Peña raided the town of Guayubín on February 21, 1863, Cabrera distinguished himself as one of the most daring combatants. Having failed in this action, he rejected the guarantees offered by the Spanish authorities and fled to the border area, taking refuge on a hill that was known by his name from then on, as well as a town today. He stayed there until August 16 of that year when he was finally able to make contact with the group led by Rodríguez, Monción and Pimentel and together with them he crossed the northern border and on the hill of Capotillo, located on the northern border with Haiti, they raised the tricolor flag, made by the Curaçaoan tailor Humberto Marsan, in what is known as the Grito del Capotillo, which ignited the Dominican Restoration War.

He was one of the main leaders who initiated the actions that day by attacking and taking the Sabaneta square. Later, he took part in the siege of the city of Santiago, in which he was chief of the Otra Banda canton and later, he also carried out missions in San José de las Matas. On September 16, 1863, he traveled with Masagó to the border and was in Bánica and Las Matas de Farfán in the southern region.

A letter from the Ministry of War, dated November 2, 1863, ordered him to be ready to command a column that would operate in San Cristóbal. Shortly after, he was back in the Northwest. In the Line he commanded the patriots' camp in Manzanillo, and fought against the Spaniards who landed with General José de la Gándara in Montecristi on April 17, 1864. After the fall of the government of General Gaspar Polanco, in January 1865, he was one of the restorers persecuted by President Pedro Antonio Pimentel. After the liberation from Spain, he continued his honorable career as a man of arms and patriot.

== Later career ==
After the Dominican Republic was restored, Cabrera retired to a farm where he tended his crops, even though he was named Commander of Arms in Dajabón, but he remained attentive to any call from the Provisional Restoration Government. He joined the Blue Party and fought against the Six Years regime of Buenaventura Báez. In 1869, when Báez and his anti-national dictatorship were eagerly seeking the annexation of the country to the United States, Cabrera reaffirmed his status as a pro independence patriot and temporarily took Sabaneta by storm.

== Death ==
He died in poverty on March 14, 1884 at the age of 74 in Peladero, Montecristi. Another version states that he died in Las Aguas, jurisdiction of the same province. His remains were buried in the Montecristi cemetery.

== See also ==
- Grito del Capotillo
- Dominican Restoration War
