= Benito Monción =

Dominican revolutionary (1826–1898)

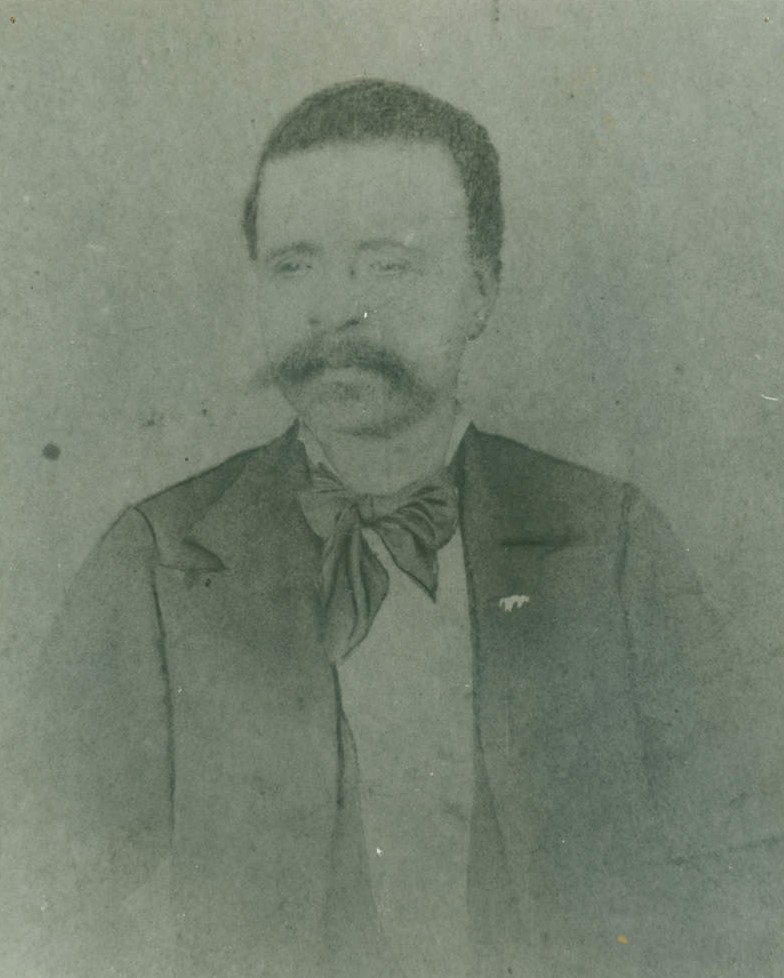
- Monción c. 1860s–1870s
- Born: March 29, 1826; La Vega, Dominican Republic
- Died: February 11, 1898 (aged 71) Guayubín, Dominican Republic
- Buried: National Pantheon of the Dominican Republic
- Allegiance: Dominican Republic
- Branch: Dominican Army: Liberation Army; Restoration Army
- Service years: 1844–1898
- Rank: General
- Conflicts: Dominican War of Independence; Dominican Restoration War; Six Years' War
- Awards: National hero

Benito Monción Duran (March 29, 1826 – February 11, 1898) was a Dominican revolutionary hero who participated in the Dominican War of Independence. He later played an active role in various military campaigns of the Dominican Restoration War, which consolidated the independence of the Dominican Republic.

== Early life ==
He was born on March 29, 1826, in La Vega, but he grew up in Dajabón because his mother moved to live there when Benito was little. A social product of poorest strata of the peasantry, Monción resided in Sabaneta. He was a farm laborer service of the rich hatero and merchant Santiago Rodríguez Masagó.

Because he lived near the border, he was one of the first Dominicans to face the Haitian invasions during the Dominican War of Independence. In 1845, he received the rank of Sergeant for his courage and will in the Battle of Beler and was later promoted to second lieutenant in the battalion in Dajabón. In 1856, he fought in the Battle of Sabana Larga against the army of Emperor Faustin I. By the end of the war, he reached the rank of Lieutenant Colonel.

== Dominican Restoration War ==
When Spain invaded the country in 1861, he was enrolled in the Reserves at the service of the annexation authorities, but he was one of the most industrious fighters to expel the Spanish occupiers. Monción was among the organizers and protagonists of the February 21 uprising in Guayubín. When it became impossible to keep that town under control, Lucas de Peña ordered it to be abandoned, Monción retreated and tried to become strong at the Mangá post, where he fought until the superiority of the physical force of the Spaniards prevailed.

Chief Lucas de Peña and other patriotic officers accepted the peace proposal made by the Spanish through a commission of Dominicans, but Monción flatly rejected it and remained rebellious in the Line fields. He was sentenced to death in default. Together with Santiago Rodríguez and Pedro Antonio Pimentel, he led the preparations for the restart of the armed struggle. He settled in Haiti from where he sometimes raided the enemy, in coordination with the guerrillas of the Colonel José Cabrera. He was present in Capotillo on the August 16, 1863 and from there the combat continued with his comrades in arms. After the clashes in La Patilla and Macabón, he participated in the persecution of Brigadier General Manuel Buceta and on August 17, he was about to die in the town of Cayucal, when he overtook his companions and, with a machete in hand, pounced on Buceta, whom he pursued closely. At that moment Monción's horse rolled on the ground and while trying to get up he was wounded by a sword blow to the head and another to the left arm by a Spanish dragon. The bold and heroic intervention of Pimentel and several other officers prevented them from finishing off the patriot, who was taken to the house of a Guayacanes resident named Francisco Cruz.

On August 30, Monción learned that General Gaspar Polanco had moved into the field of restaurateurs and was already in Quinigua and was preparing to attack Santiago. Without recovering, far from it, as if he asked permission to the pain of the injuries to reintegrate into fighting, Monción left for that point, and took charge of an artillery unit with which he systematically attacked the San Luis Fortress defended by the Spanish forces. When they were forced to retreat towards Puerto Plata, they had in Monción one of their most obstinate and effective pursuers. Then, on November 1, 1863, on the recommendation of General Polanco, Monción was designated Commander of Arms of the strategic Plaza de Monte Cristi. Then he was the boss of the entire Northwest.

It was up to Benito Monción, who had already achieved the rank of general, to carry out the difficult task of resisting the massive attack of April 17, 1864 directed by Marshal José de la Gándara against the national forces in Monte Cristi. De la Gándara, who had replaced Carlos de Vargas as Captain General on March 31, 1864, had a well-earned reputation for cruelty and was at the same time cunning and aggressive. He believed that, with the ports of Samaná and Puerto Plata in Spanish hands, the conquest of Monte Cristi assured him control of all the ports of the North, and all possibility of maritime communication with the outside world would be closed to the national government. Once this objective was achieved, it was a matter of recovering the entire Line, then embarking on the conquest of Santiago, taking possession of the central areas of the country and uniting the capital and the North again, under the reestablished rule of the Spanish. For the execution of this plan, only from Cuba, and without mentioning reinforcements arrived from Puerto Rico, received De la Gándara, by the bay of Manzanillo, 14 ships that transported about six thousand men and the corresponding war material. Added to this force was the one that could be formed with the forced recruitment of Dominican citizens between 15 and 60 years of age. With the weight of that powerful military body, he launched himself to take Monte Cristi, the initial step of the march that the Spanish had planned.

With barely five hundred poorly armed men, generals Monción, Juan Antonio Polanco, Federico de Jesús García and Pedro Antonio Pimentel, led the resistance that, although it could not prevent the landing and conquest of the city, was so energetic and effective that it made pay a high price in deaths and injuries to the invaders. One of the wounded were on that occasion Field Marshal cousin of Rivera, who had to be retired in a state of gravity on the battlefield.

Despite the blow they intended to strike with the taking of Monte Cristi, and the pronouncements triumph lists of De la Gándara, the military situation of the Spanish did not change substantially. The patriots deployed in mobile guerrillas in all areas of the city and the invaders found themselves condemned to paralysis, trapped in the intricate complexities of the area that they had just conquered. The simple and elemental task of giving drink to the cavalry, became in a daily military operation, full of difficulties and dangers. Taking the horses to the river, an elemental but indispensable, meaning he wanted to expose himself to gunshots and guerrilla ambushes. They remained lurking a short distance from the city center.

When he wanted to occupy other populations of the Northwest, the tactic of the restorers was abandon the towns and villages, after setting them on fire so that the new occupants will find nothing in them. And when they took them, then created the problem of supplying the troops, through convoys and caravans that with dangerous frequency they fell into hands of the patriots. To depart from the royal roads and the towns and try to penetrate the thick and thorny mountains of the Line, was to expose oneself to walking along unknown paths, to feeling watched by a thousand ignored eyes and venture to march guided many times by practical infiltrators who abandoned and left them disoriented in the middle of the mountains full of unfathomable mysteries for strangers, populated by cacti and shrimps, of guards and bayahondas; plagued with poisonous insects, all of which added to the harsh ravages of the climate, to which the Spanish succumbed and saw the number of casualties increase. This is how De la Gándara's expeditionary force was left stranded in Monte Cristi, and an important part of the glories that originate in these episodes of the War of Restoration, without a doubt some, are the highlights of General Monción.

On October 8, 1864, Benito Monción received what he deserved promotion from general to general division. Days later he supported the coup led by Gaspar Polanco against José Antonio Salcedo; and in January 1865, he was one of the leaders of the uprising that culminated in the fall of Polanco and Pimentel's rise to power.

== Later years and death ==
After the restoration of sovereignty, Monción maintained a relatively moderate political career. He was a staunch opponent of Buenaventura Báez, who was engaging with the United States, under President Ulysses S. Grant, about a possible annexation project. He participated in the Six Years' War, which ended with the ousting of Báez in November 1873, and the annulment of the annexation project. In 1879, Monción was appointed governor of Monte Cristi, where he established a private fiefdom and assumed princely airs.

At some point, he was exiled to the Turks and Caicos Islands. It was there, in March 1887, he had the commendable gesture of telling the intellectual Mariano Antonio Cestero his version of the events recorded at the beginning of the Restoration War. Cestero collected the narrative that was published in 1902, in a pamphlet titled De Capotillo a Santiago.

Over the next twelve years, the oppressive tyranny of General Ulises Heurauex had reigned. Following the failure of Casimiro de Moya's revolution against the dictator, Monción was arrested and expelled from the country. He went into exile in the Bahamas and did not return to the country until 1886 after being granted amnesty. He became seriously ill, asked to be allowed to die at his home in Guayubín and this last wish was granted. On February 11, 1898, Monción died at the age of 71. A funeral was prepared for him and it is said that from his deathbed, the dying general, in full lucidity, was able to listen to the rehearsals that a band of music of the funeral march he would have to go to the grave.

== Transfer of remains ==
On August 16, 1944, dictator Rafael Leonidas Trujillo arranged for his remains to rest in the Chapel of the Heroes of the Holy Metropolitan Cathedral. His remains were later transferred to the National Pantheon.

== See also ==
- Santiago Rodríguez Masagó
- Gaspar Polanco
- Ulises Heureaux
