= Grito de Capotillo =

Act that triggered the Dominican Restoration War

The Grito de Capotillo is considered the act that began the Dominican Restoration War that sought the Independence of Dominican Republic from the Kingdom of Spain, which had annexed it in 1861. This battle cry, initiated by Dominican rebels on August 16, 1863, was the third (and final) proclamation of Dominican independence from an occupying force, succeeding prior proclamations such as the formations of the Republic of Spanish Haiti and the First Dominican Republic of 1821 and 1844, respectively.

== History ==
On August 16, 1863, in La Visite, near Ouanaminthe, Haiti, a group of Dominican revolutionaries led by Santiago Rodríguez Masagó, Benito Monción, José Cabrera, and an unknown person met while on the Dominican side of the border another group of revolutionaries waited, among whom were Juan Antonio Polanco and Pedro Antonio Pimentel.

On August 16, 1863, the revolutionaries armed with machetes and a few rifles led by Santiago Rodríguez would take advantage of the fact that the Spanish Government ordered the displacement of the border garrisons, and the La Corona Battalion with a section of artillery and another of hunters towards San Felipe de Puerto Plata and Santiago de los Caballeros to enter Spanish territory and go to the hill of Capotillo Español where they raised the flag of the extinct Dominican state made by the native of Saint Thomas, Huberto Marsán, to the sound of a reveille along with drum rolls.

== Aftermath ==
On August 11, 1864, the Provisional Government of José Antonio Salcedo, based in Santiago de los Caballeros, declared August 16 as a national holiday and acquired constitutional status from the constitutional reform of the Substantive Pact of the Nation of November 14, 1865.

== Legacy ==
On March 3, 1930, President Horacio Vásquez was overthrown, and Rafael Estrella Ureña assumed the leadership of the state and on the same day of his rise to power he established that the next president would be the same day of the restoration, August 16, 1930. President Estrella Ureña said:

It is my turn, in effect, to preside over the destinies of the Dominican people, at the solemn moment in which all parties prepare to debate in an edifying civic struggle under the era of the government that must protect the rights of all with absolute equality of opportunity, so that they can choose the man to whom I must transmit the powerful burden of power on the coming August 16th.

Rafael Leónidas Trujillo was the first to assume office on August 16, however most subsequent presidents have assumed office on different dates such as Manuel de Jesús Troncoso who assumed office on March 7, 1940, due to the death of Jacinto Peynado, while Rafael Leónidas Trujillo would return to occupy the presidency but on May 18, 1942 (he had an inauguration in 1947) due to the resignation of Jesús Troncoso and after Héctor Trujillo resigned on August 3, 1862, no president would take office again on August 16 until the first term of the second Government of Joaquín Balaguer concluded on August 16, 1970. Due to the suicide of Antonio Guzmán Fernández, Jacobo Majluta would assume the presidency on July 4, 1982, and it was not until August 16, 1982, with the arrival of Salvador Jorge Blanco, that all the presidents of the Dominican Republic would occupy office on August 16, uninterruptedly until today.

== See also ==
- Dominican Restoration War
- Battle of Guayubín
- Santiago Rodríguez Masagó
- Grito de Lares
