= Battle of Monte Cristi =

1864 conflict in Dominican Restoration War

- Part of the Dominican Restoration War
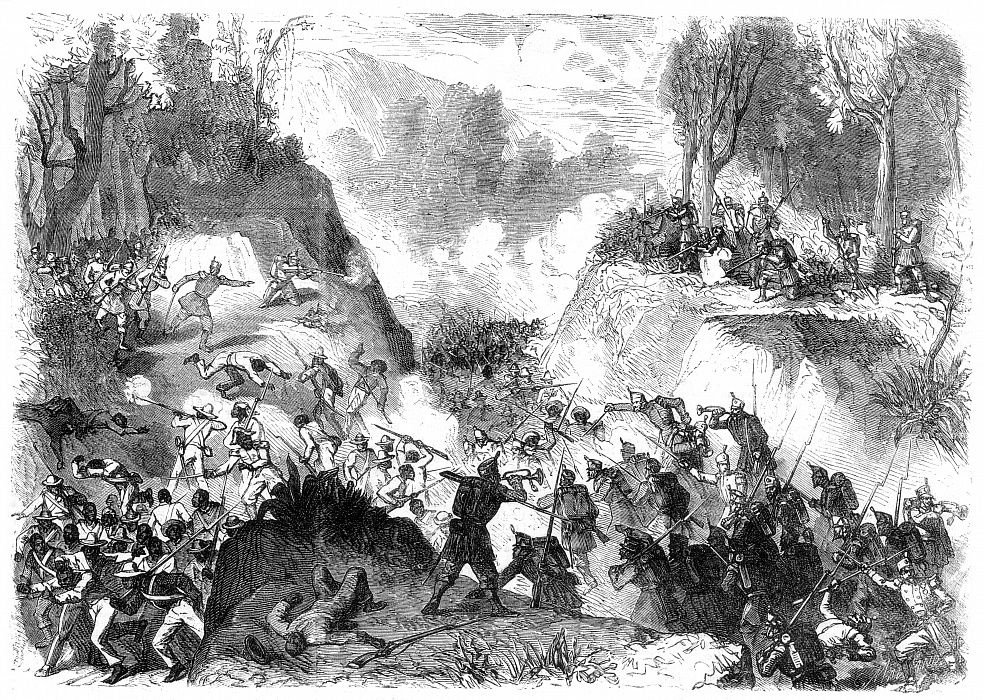
- Illustration of the Battle of Monte Cristi
Date	May 15, 1864
Location	Monte Cristi, Captaincy General of Santo Domingo
Result	Spanish victory

Belligerents
Kingdom of Spain: Captaincy General of Cuba	Dominican Republic

Commanders and leaders
(Spain) José de la Gándara	(Dominican Republic) Benito Monción

Strength
6,000	500

Casualties and losses
100 killed or wounded Heavy	Unknown

The Battle of Montecristi (Spanish: Batalla de Montecristi) was fought on May 15, 1864 in the Captaincy General of Santo Domingo, during the Dominican Restoration War (1863–65) between Dominican forces and Spain. A Spanish force of 6,000 troops with 13 cannons, commanded by Captain-General José de la Gándara, sailed from Santiago de Cuba to Manzanillo Bay and attacked Dominican insurgents led by Benito Monción in the town of Monte Cristi. The Dominicans were defeated and forced to retreat, and the future Spanish general Fernando Primo de Rivera was wounded during the fighting.

This battle is the most significant victory won by Spain in this conflict during the year 1864. The Dominicans subsequently evaded direct confrontations and opted for guerrilla tactics which forced the Spaniards to confine themselves to Santo Domingo, the capital.

Realizing that the reconquest of the island promised to be costly and uncertain, Spain gave up its enterprise and Queen Isabella II of Spain authorized the abandonment of the colony on May 3, 1865.

== See also ==
- Battle of Paso del Muerto
- Battle of Sabana de San Pedro
- Battle of La Canela
