= Santiago Rodríguez Masagó =

Dominican military commander (1809–1879)

Santiago Rodríguez
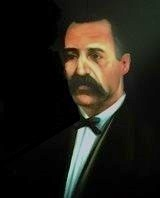
- Born: Santiago Rodríguez Masagó c. 1809 – 1810; Fort-Liberté, Haiti
- Died: May 27, 1879; San Ignacio De Sabaneta, Santiago Rodríguez, Republica Dominicana
- Military career
- Allegiance: Dominican Republic
- Branch: Dominican Army: Liberation Army; Restoration Army
- Service years: 1843–1879
- Rank: General
- Nickname: Chago
- Conflicts: Reform Revolution; Dominican War of Independence; Dominican Restoration War

Santiago Rodríguez Masagó (c. 1809 – 27 May 1879), also known as Santiago Rodríguez, nicknamed Chago, was a Dominican military leader who is known for being one of the rebels who initiated the famous Grito del Capotillo that began the Dominican Restoration War.

== Early years ==
Little is known of his birth, but sources suggest that he was either born in Cap-Haïtien or the area of Fort-Liberté (in a part where it is present day Dajabón). Many historians agree that the son of the landowner Vicente Rodríguez (of Dominican descent), and Josefina Masagó (of Haitian descent), two wealthy merchants from the city of Santiago in the Dominican Republic.

At an early age, Rodríguez moved to the border region in the company of his father Vicente Rodríguez who had to dedicate himself to commercial activities and free-range livestock raising where there were natural conditions for free-range livestock raising such as fertile plains, drinking water, despite that an important part of them had become the property of Haitians. Tobacco (andullos), coffee, products made from guano such as serones, hats, organas, backpacks, as well as other goods that Haiti imported from Europe were also sold.

These productive activities on the Dominican-Haitian border allowed Rodríguez to accumulate a large fortune, get to know all the nooks and crannies of that region and establish friendly relations with many people, in addition to having a large number of workers at his service.

On the border, Rodríguez established a friendship with one of the locals, Benito Monción (Benoit), who, although he was born in La Vega in 1826, at an early age his mother had taken him to live in Dajabón, where he worked as a laborer on Rodríguez's ranch.

== Early military career ==
In 1843, Rodríguez began his military career when he participated in the Reform Revolution that culminated in the Praslin revolution in Haiti and the overthrow of the Haiti's president Jean Pierre Boyer. In recognition of his work, the new president, Charles Riviére-Hérard, recognized him as an army officer.

Due to the prestige and fame he had on the border, after the proclamation of Dominican independence in 1844, the Central Government Board commissioned generals Matías Ramón Mella and Manuel Mena to meet with Rodríguez. He was appointed as military assistant of Dajabón Square and made his debut in the independence efforts when it unsuccessfully confronted the powerful Haitian troops led by Jean-Louis Pierrot, who had been defeated in the Battle of Santiago. Due to the damage caused by Pierrot's troops in Dajabón, Santiago Rodríguez and a large group of people moved to live in Sabaneta from where he participated in the various battles of the Dominican War of Independence, between 1844 and 1856, to prevent the attempts of the Haitian political leaders to absorb the nascent republic. He fought in the Battle of Sabana Larga, on January 26, 1856 in which he was wounded.

== Dominican Restoration War ==
=== Annexation to Spain ===
With the excuse that the frequent Haitian invasions represented a threat to the existence of the Dominican Republic and that it was also necessary to overcome the economic stagnation of the republic, on March 18, 1861, General Pedro Santana proclaimed the annexation of the republic to the Kingdom of Spain, which at that time was in decline. With the annexation, the leading groups managed to concretize the project that they had conceived since the founding of the First Dominican Republic in 1844.

The action had the support of the most important military leaders, intellectuals and numerous prominent personalities from Santo Domingo and various towns in the country, as can be seen in the manifestos published on the occasion, among which was Sabaneta, where 63 people spoke in favor of the annexation. From all this it can be inferred that, in principle, the annexation to Spain had a certain level of popular acceptance.

However, he did not agree with the annexation, especially after seeing the measures taken by the new authorities. Dominicans had less income and more difficulties developing their lives normally. The national currency was withdrawn and a new one was imposed, at a very high exchange rate. Public jobs were assigned to Spaniards and the Dominicans who previously held them were fired. Another serious regret was the imposition of very high taxes on the already impoverished population. Laws were also established that treated Dominican farmers almost like slaves, forcing them to work several days a week for public works without any type of payment. Racial discrimination against those who supported the annexation due to their condition as Creoles, blacks and mulattoes, had transpired. The only promise kept by the Spanish was abolition of slavery, which had been maintained since the Constitution of 1844. All these factors, added to some measures taken by the Catholic Church, caused the town to reach the limit.

The fight against the annexation government was started on May 2, 1861 by Colonel José Contreras in Moca and continued in July of this same year by Francisco del Rosario Sánchez, who was captured in an ambush in El Cercado and then shot after having crossed the Dominican-Haitian border in the company of General José María Cabral who skillfully managed to escape. In February 1863 there were revolutionary uprisings in Neiba on February 9, Guayubín on the 21st, Sabaneta on the 22nd and Santiago de los Caballeros on the night of the 24th.

=== Uprising of 1863 ===
General Santiago Rodríguez is credited with having organized and financed the Sabaneta and Guayubín insurrections. For this he made contact with the main leaders of the Northwest Region, recruited a large number of men, acquired weapons (machetes, sabers, rifles, ammunition, supplies, etc.) and was the one who drew up the military strategy to follow to confront the powerful Spanish army, along with Lucas de Peña, Benito Monción, José Cabrera and other military leaders.

In a manifesto, the insurgents proclaimed the following:

“Pronouncement of San Ignacio de Sabaneta, celebrated on March 25, 1861

In the town of San Ignacio de Sabaneta, northern border, on the twenty-fifth day of the month of March, of the year of grace one thousand eight hundred and sixty-one. We, the undersigned, civil and military authorities, parents and citizens in full enjoyment of political rights. Knowing that all the peoples that make up the Republic have spoken out in favor of the Spanish nation, for which we have great sympathies, and convinced that only under the protection of a solid government like that, can we enjoy true peace, of security and rest: we declare with all the spontaneity of free men, that we adhere to the pronouncement of other peoples, and from this moment we entrust our most precious interests to the paternal and generous Queen Isabella II.

In witness of which we sign this act of adhesion that we want the original to be sent to whoever is legally entitled so that it may have the effects that we sincerely desire. Long live SM Catholic! Long live the Dominican people! Long live the liberating general!

Already with a feeling of Dominicanness formed, the Dominicans united, organized by heroes like Santiago Rodríguez, who was at the head of the initial movement. It was he who chose the right moment to launch into the fight. He led the first revolt of February 1863, which was unsuccessful. Given the circumstances, he took refuge in Haiti, where together with other restoration leaders such as Pedro Antonio Pimentel, Benito Monción and José Cabrera, they organized the Grito de Capotillo, which occurred on August 16, 1863 and began the Dominican Restoration War. After the Restoration of the country, Rodríguez held various military occupations.

== Death and legacy ==
He died on May 24, 1879, in Agua Clara, Sabaneta Spanish.

== See also ==
- Matías Ramón Mella
- Gregorio Luperón
- Dominican Restoration War
