= Battle of Guayubín =

1863 battle of the Dominican Restoration War

- Part of the Dominican Restoration War
- Monte Cristi Province
Date	August 19, 1863
Location	Guayubín, Dominican Republic
Result	Dominican victory
Territorial changes	Rebels occupy Monte Cristi

Belligerents
(Dominican Republic) Dominican Rebels	Kingdom of Spain: (Spain) Captaincy General of Santo Domingo

Commanders and leaders
(Dominican Republic) Benito Monción	(Spain) Manuel Buceta

The Battle of Guayubín (Spanish: Batalla de Guayubín) was a battle of the Dominican Restoration War that took place on August 19, 1863. Dominican forces attacked Spanish cavalry and a marching column during its movement through the northwest, resulting in scattered skirmishes and a Spanish withdrawal toward Guayubín.
