= Pedro Florentino =

Dominican general and military officer (1805–1864)

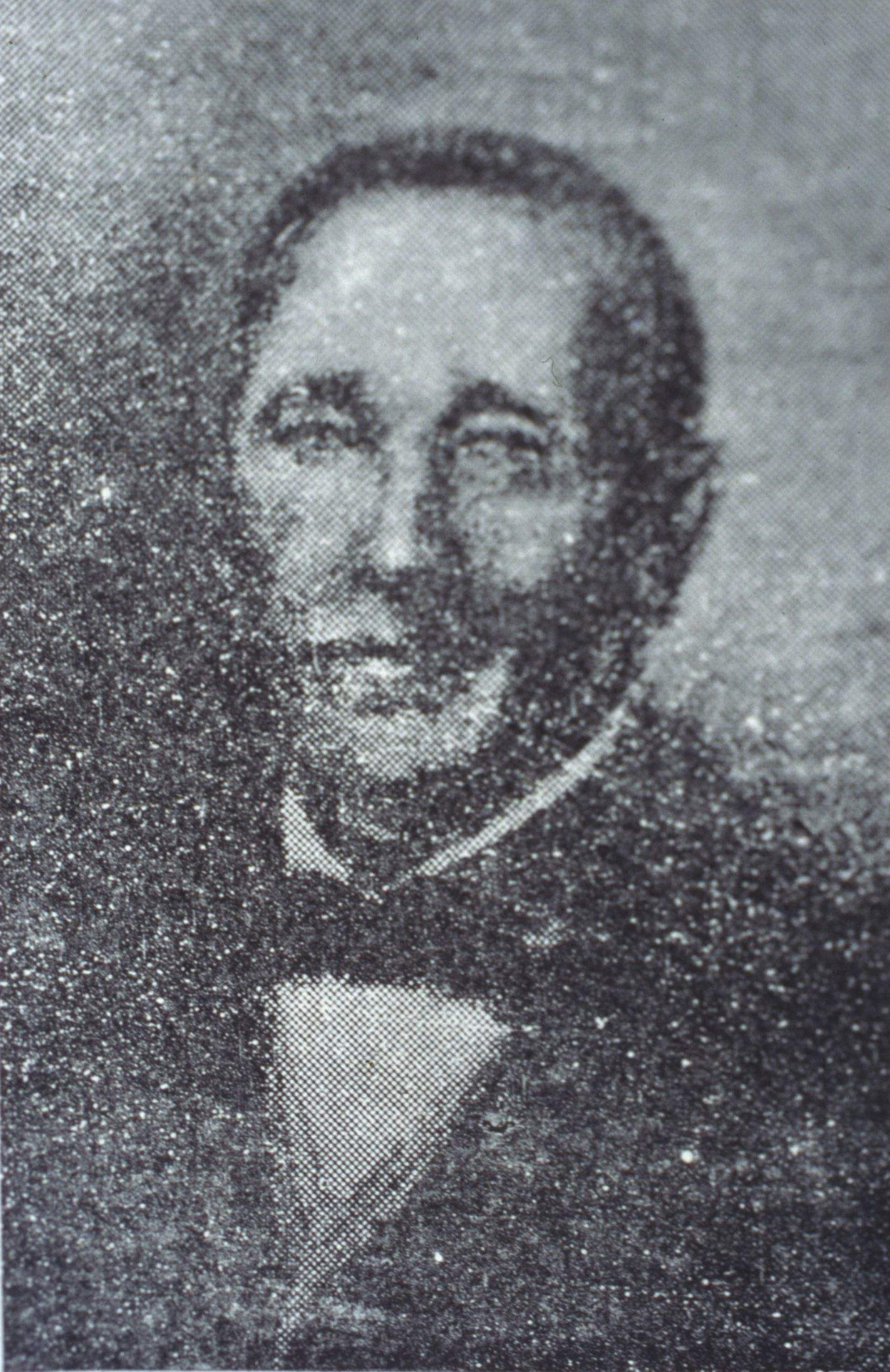
- Born: c. 1805 or 1806; Hincha, Captaincy General of Santo Domingo
- Died: 1864 (aged 58 or 59); Dominican Republic
- Cause of death: Assassination
- Military career
- Allegiance: Dominican Republic
- Branch: Dominican Army
- Rank: General
- Conflicts: Dominican War of Independence; Cibaeño Revolution; Dominican Restoration War

Pedro Alejandrino Florentino (1805/1808 – 1864) was a Dominican officer and general in the army of the Dominican Republic. He was an active participant in border conflicts during the Dominican War of Independence. He was the hero of the important Battle of Sabana Larga. He later participated in the Dominican Restoration War, along with Gregorio Luperón, against Spain.

== Early life ==
He was born in Hincha (today Haitian territory) in either 1805 or 1806. Of mulatto ancestry, his father was José Antonio Florentino, who was of Italian descent, and his mother was a black woman of unknown origin. His historical figure has been so discussed and controversial to the point that there is more than one version about the date and place of his birth. His biographer and defender, Sócrates Nolasco, assures that Florentino must have been born between 1805 and 1806; but other information maintains that he was 52 years old in 1861, so his birth must have occurred in 1809; and the same historian Nolasco cites statements offered in Azua by Florentino himself who declared that he was 55 years old in 1863, that his birthplace had been Santo Domingo and that he had lived in San Juan de la Maguana, which sets the date of his birth in 1808. His exact birth date is still unknown.

== Early military career ==
In the handling of the saber he had few rivals. He was famously known to have had a duel that he had with another brave man from the legendary south, Timoteo Ogando, the head of the heroic tribe of Pedro Corto. From that event it was said that “Florentino pressure (crossed) Timoteo," because he knocked down his sword and then marked a cross on his forehead.

He owned stills and agricultural and livestock properties in San Juan de la Maguana. He was a patriot of radical nationalism and questionable methods due to the violent and primitive character that Florentino gave him. He was an officer in the Dominican War of Independence that lasted for nearly thirteen years. He fought under the orders of General Antonio Duvergé, as an artillery officer and commander of one of the Dominican columns that victoriously fought the famous Battle of Sabana Larga on January 24, 1856.

On October 11, 1856, under the presidency of the leader of his political devotion, Buenaventura Báez, went on to occupy the Arms Command of San Francisco de Macorís and later to serve as Governor of La Vega, a province that then included Moca, Cotuí, Bonao, Constanza, Jarabacoa and San Francisco de Macorís to the Northeast coast. He was also a Government Delegate in the entire Northern region, from Bonao to Monte Cristi. Among other important positions, Florentino had been Chief of the Southern Borders and commander of Las Matas de Farfán. During the liberal revolution of 1857, he left La Vega and came to the capital, Santo Domingo which was then under an eleven-month siege, to fight in defense of the Baecista government.

== Dominican Restoration War ==
From there he returned to the South and already during the Spanish regime, suspicions arose that he was involved in conspiracies. In January 1863, he was called for interrogation in Azua and the authorities gave him the choice between El Seibo, Santo Domingo or Azua, as a place of residence as a prisoner. He chose Azua and in September 1863, after the outbreak of the Dominican Restoration War in the North, he placed himself at the head of the national movement in the Southern region.

The provisional government of Cibao, based in the city of Santiago, proceeded to appoint Pedro Florentino as Senior Chief of Operations in the South. The person named immediately began to receive congratulations and multiple endorsements from all the towns and fields of all those fierce regions. And he arrived with his troops to Baní and San Cristóbal. Precisely in San Cristóbal, Gregorio Luperón was organizing guerrillas, when Pedro Florentino, a man of recognized courage, treated Luperón with great deference and presented him with the decree of the government of Santiago, where he, Florentino, was named Superior Chief of the South. And he also presented him with an order ordering Luperón to be shot. Luperón read it and told him: “General Florentino, do your duty.” Florentino told him: “Retreat to the house where you are staying.” Later Florentino appeared in front of Luperón, telling him: “I am going to send you a letter so that you can go out along the road to El Maniel. So that the government shoots you there in Santiago. Because I should not bear the responsibility of such a crime.”

He led the uprisings of San Juan, Las Matas de Farfán and Sabana Mula, between September 16 and 17 and days later that of Neiba and Barahona, whose protagonist and main organizer was General Ángel Félix –Liberata–. Together with him and other officers such as General Aniceto Martínez, Florentino, superior leader of the movement in the entire region, attacked Azua, took Baní, San Cristóbal and on the banks of the Haina he threatened to march on the Capital, just as he had been told, as proposed to President José Antonio Salcedo.

The Spanish counterattack came. On October 15, 1863, the Spanish general José de la Gándara left the Capital heading south, leading a well-armed column of three thousand men, accompanied by the Pro-Spanish general Eusebio Puello. After being detained in San Cristóbal for about a month, De la Gándara unleashed a vast-scale offensive before which the resistance of the patriots was broken. On November 18, in the middle of a fire, Baní fell. The Spanish attack became unstoppable, the Dominicans could not find a way to stop that overwhelming march and the Southern region once again fell into the hands of the annexationists.

Florentino did not find a way to offer effective resistance to that attack, he himself withdrew towards the vicinity of the border; demoralization Gabino Simonó, Rudecindo de León, Francisco Martínez, Domingo Piñeiro, Julián Morris, Pedro Zorilla, Manuel Baldemora, Juan Gregorio Rincón, José Corporán, Luciano Solís, Romualdo Montero, Juan de la Cruz, Epifanio Jiménez Sierra and José Luis Paredes.

== Assassination ==
According to tradition, Pedro Florentino killed his son, Captain “Santo Domingo Florentino." And he did not appeal to revenge. Later, Florentino was assassinated at the border, while he was asleep, by Lieutenant Juan Rondón, in 1864.

== See also ==
- History of the Dominican Republic
- Dominican War of Independence
- Battle of Santomé
- Dominican Restoration War
- Gregorio Luperón
- Matías Ramón Mella
- Dominican Army
