= Battle of Melilla (1860) =

- Part of the Hispano-Moroccan War
Date	9 February 1860
Location	Near Melilla
Result	Moroccan victory

Belligerents
Morocco	Spain

Commanders and leaders
(Morocco) Unknown	(Spain) Manuel Buceta del Villar

Strength
15,000 men	1,200 men

Casualties and losses
Negligible	370 men

The battle of Melilla took place in February 1860, during the Spanish-Moroccan War, when the Spanish garrison of Melilla suffered a fiasco caused by Riffian fighters outside the city.

== Battle ==
On February 6, the Spanish Melilla garrison was disturbed by the Riffian attacks. The governor of Melilla, Manuel Buceta del Villar, decided to confront the Riffians. The Spanish general, Leopoldo O'Donnell, warned Manuel of any reckless attack, but Manuel disobeyed him. He led a force of 1,200 men to pursue the Moroccans after their defeat at Tétouan.

Manuel believed that the Moroccan forces were low in morale and that the Moroccan commanders wouldn't dare to face him. This proved to be wrong. On the night of February 8–9, he established a camp outside the vicinity of Melilla. The Moroccans, with a large army of 15,000 men, focused on their efforts to attack the Spanish camp. The Spanish were taken by surprise and routed. The Riffians chased the Spanish to the walls of Melilla. The Spanish suffered 370 casualties in this fiasco, while the Riffian casualties were negligible.

== Aftermath ==
O'Donnell was furious when he learned of the disastrous sortie and ordered the Spanish navy to bombard several coastal cities to save his face but these did not bring any results. Meanwhile, the news of this victory spread throughout Morocco, and exaggerating the victory did nothing to force Sultan Moulay Muhammad to ask for peace.

== Sources ==
- Jason Lyall (2020), Divided Armies, Inequality and Battlefield Performance in Modern War.
- Henri Mordacq (1908), La guerre au Maroc : enseignements tactiques des deux guerres Franco-marocaine (1844) et Hispano-marocaine (1859–1860) (2e édition).
- French Africa Committee and Morocco Committee (1925), French Africa: monthly bulletin of the French Africa Committee and the Morocco Committee.
