= Norberto Torres (military commander) =

Dominican military commander

Norberto Torres was a Dominican soldier and military commander in the Dominican Restoration War.

== Biography ==
He started out as a cavalry officer during the fight for independence from Haiti. As a militant opponent of the Spanish annexation, he was aware of the preparations of the movement that was organized in various parts of Cibao. An informant of his alerted the Spanish. It is said that Torres was at the house of one of his loved ones when he heard a Spanish soldier greeted him with the words: “How are you, countryman?”. Torres, without considering the consequences, answered his greeting: “Am I your countryman? Within five days, you Spaniards will know what awaits you.” Arrests began almost immediately, and Lucas de Peña decided to precipitate the assault on the Plaza de Guayubín on February 21, 1863. Guayubín and Sabaneta fell into the hands of the patriots, but the movement did not have immediate continuity and failed due to the counterattack of the Spanish people. Norberto Torres fled to Haitian territory and was saved from the death sentence that the military court, that tried those events, handed down against him.

He returned from Haiti to fight the Spanish and fought in several towns such as El Duro, Guayubín, Laguna Verde and Algodonal. According to historian Rufino Martínez, during the course of the Dominican Restoration War, Torres became indifferent, especially when the danger of a massive invasion of the Spanish by Monte Cristi loomed. He became suspicious in the eyes of the authorities and was even briefly confined in Santiago, until, apparently, the doubts were cleared up.

In the years following the restoration of the Dominican Republic, he became active in the revolution against Buenaventura Báez. In 1877, he was a member of the Blue Party and often clashed frequently with the Red Party. Eventually, two Baecistas, John Brighman and Juancito Díaz, surprised Norberto Torres and murdered him at home in Guayubín.

== See also ==
- Gregorio Luperón
- Dominican Restoration War
- Blue Party
