= Battle of Sabana Larga =

1856 battle of the Dominican War of Independence (1844–1856)

- Part of the Dominican War of Independence
- Dajabón Province
Date	24 January 1856
Location	Sabana Larga, near Dajabón
Result	Dominican victory

Belligerents
Dominican Republic	Haiti

Commanders and leaders
(Dominican Republic) Juan Luis Franco Bidó (Dominican Republic) Gaspar Polanco (Dominican Republic) Pedro Florentino (Dominican Republic) Lucas de Peña (Dominican Republic) Eusebio Puello	(Second Empire of Haiti) Faustin I of Haiti (Second Empire of Haiti) Jean-Hilaire Cayemite (Second Empire of Haiti) Trou Guerrier-Prophète

Strength
6,500–8,000	8,000–22,000

Casualties and losses
236 killed	1,000+ killed Hundreds of prisoners 2 artillery pieces captured

The Battle of Sabana Larga (Spanish: Batalla de Sabana Larga) was a major battle during the years after the Dominican War of Independence. It was fought on 24 January 1856 in Sabana Larga, Dajabón. A force of 8,000 Dominican troops of the Army of the North, led by General Juan Luis Franco Bidó, defeated a numerically larger force of 22,000 Haitian troops under Emperor Faustin I. Another part of the Haitian Army was entrenched in Jácuba near Puerto Plata, but were defeated by Pedro Florentino and General Lucas de Peña.
