= Lucas de Peña =

Dominican independence fighter (1823–1909)

Lucas Evangelista de Peña (1823–1909) was a Dominican general who was an important figure in the Dominican Republic's struggles against Haiti and Spain.

== Biography ==
He was born in 1823 in Villa Nueva, Guayubín. He was a veteran in the Dominican War of Independence where he reached the rank of colonel. He was one of the heroes of the Battle of Sabana Larga. He fought victoriously under the command of General Juan Luis Franco Bidó, on January 24, 1856, against the troops of the Haitian emperor Faustin Soulouque. By the end of the 1850s, he attained the rank of general.

When the annexation to Spain was proclaimed in 1861, Lucas de Peña was already a brigadier general and became part of the Reserves. He lived in the section of El Pocito, Guayubín. On February 21, 1863 he led the battle against the taking of this town. The informant of Colonel Norberto Torres had put the Spanish on the trail of the movement that was brewing. Arrests began, and chief Lucas de Peña precipitated the beginning of the uprising. He himself led the assault on Guayubín. Santiago Rodríguez Masagó reacted with upset: “Lucas already did it to me,” Rodríguez said. However, he supported De Peña and declared Sabaneta. Despite some initial successes, the movement failed and the devastating repression that caused the disbandment came.

Lucas de Peña was tried by a military commission. He evaded capture by moving to Haiti. And so, when the war reappeared on August 16, 1863, De Peña took his position as a patriotic soldier. Shortly after, he adopted a less militant attitude than was expected of a combatant of his category and suspicion arose around him, to the point that, under the presidency of Pedro Antonio Pimentel, he was kept in confinement in the city of Santiago, although for a very short time.

After the end of the war, he refrained from participation from public life and spent his energy in private life and in caring for the herd of cattle that he had inherited from his parents. He died in 1909.
