= Battle of Sabana de San Pedro =

1864 battle of the Dominican Restoration War

- Part of the Dominican Restoration War
Date	January 23, 1864
Location	San Pedro Savannah, Dominican Republic
Result	Spanish victory

Belligerents
Kingdom of Spain	Dominican Republic

Commanders and leaders
(Spain) Antonio Abad Alfau (Spain) Juan Suero	(Dominican Republic) Gregorio Luperón (Dominican Republic) José Antonio Salcedo (Dominican Republic) Matías Ramón Mella (Dominican Republic) Antonio Caba (Dominican Republic) Florencio Hernandez

Strength
Unknown	3,000

The Battle of Sabana de San Pedro was a military engagement of the Dominican Restoration War that occurred on January 23, 1864. The Spanish Army under the command of Field Marshal Antonio Abad Alfau defeated the Dominican Liberation Army commanded by General Gregorio Luperón, forcing them to withdraw from the Sabana de San Pedro area.

== See also ==
- Mambises
- Guerilla warfare
- Matías Ramón Mella
