= Sabana Larga, Elías Piña =

Coordinates: 18.94°N 71.66°W

Sabana Larga, Elías Piña is a Dominican municipal district of Comendador in the Elías Piña province.

== Population ==
In the last national census (2002), the population of Sabana Larga is included with that of Comendador.

== History ==
Sabana Larga was elevated to the category of municipal district of Comendador by the law 18 of 20 January 2004.

== Economy ==
The main economic activity of the municipality is agriculture.
