= Fortaleza San Luis =

Museo de la Fortaleza San Luis
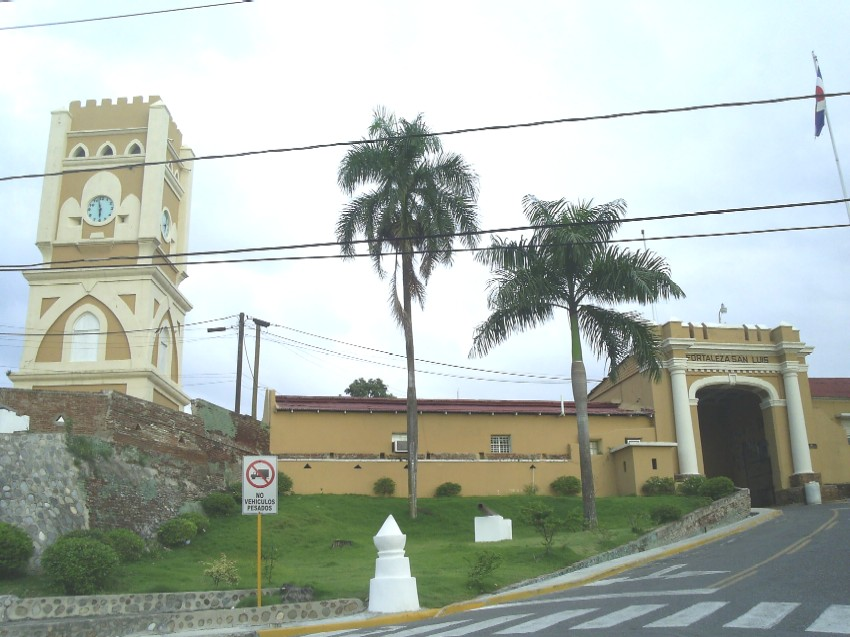
- Established: 2004
- Location: Santiago, Dominican Republic
- Coordinates: 19.448247°N 70.70282°W
- Type: History museum

Fortaleza San Luis is a fortress located near the Yaque del Norte River in southwest Santiago de los Caballeros, Dominican Republic. The Fort was the location of several battles during the War of Restoration. Fortaleza San Luis has also served as a Municipal Prison and more recently the fort has been converted into a Museum.

== History ==
The fort, throughout its history has been vital to the protection and control of the Dominican Republic's second city, Santiago, and by extension the entire Cibao Valley region. After Independence from Haiti and fearing a repeat invasion by Haiti, then president Pedro Santana requested the re-annexation of the Dominican Republic to Spain in March 1861. As such, Spain sent 4 infantries under the command of Colonel Ramon de Portal y Santo Domingo to occupy the fort. Santana's decision was not popular amongst a Nationalist movement and the War of Restauration ensued. Dominican forces repelled the Spanish and by September 1863 the fort was recaptured by Dominican forces. After the restoration of the Republic, the fort was converted into a military school, which in 1875, graduated its first class of Cadets from Officers Training in the Yaque Battalion.

In 1881, the fort added a new garrison next to the armory and in 1884, a Military Hospital was added to the fort. In 1886, President Ulises Heureaux gave as a gift to Santiago de los Caballeros a clock tower that was installed in the Fortaleza San Luis.

During the 1916 United States occupation of the Dominican Republic 1,500 4th Marines Regiment held the Fortaleza San Luis. Later in 1924, after achieving the political goals of "stabilization" the 4th Marines Regiment would leave the fort.

=== Notable prisoners ===
- Leopoldo Espaillat a Polo (1891)
- Don Máximo Grullon (1863)
- Aristides Patiño a Tilo (1891)
- Gral Evangelista Núñez (1874) Gdor de Santiago

== Renovation ==
In 2004, the fort was renovated and converted into a museum. The project was funded by the government, the private sector and by a philanthropist. The first-phase of the project came at a cost of $83,966.00RD pesos.
