= Manuel Buceta =

Spanish politician (1808–1882)

Manuel Buceta del Villar
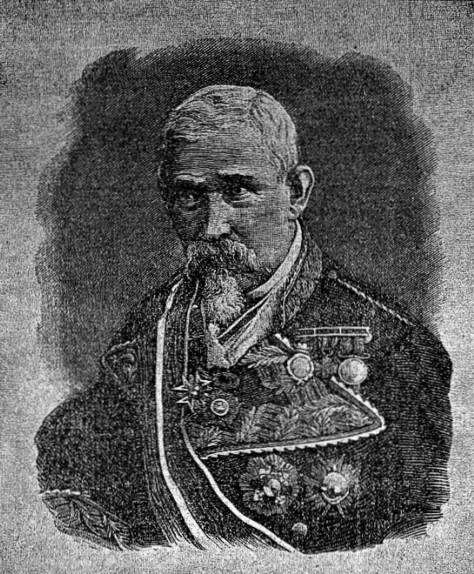
- Illustration of Brigadier Manuel Buceta del Villar
- Born: April 8, 1808; Portas, Galicia, Spain
- Died: February 3, 1882 (aged 73); Málaga, Spain
- Military career
- Allegiance: Spain
- Branch: Spanish Army
- Service years: 1846–1882
- Rank: Lieutenant General
- Conflicts: First Carlist War; Dominican Restoration War; Glorious Revolution

Manuel Buceta del Villar (April 8, 1808 – February 3, 1882) was a Spanish brigadier who served as military governor of Málaga and Melilla. He also served in the Dominican Restoration War and the First Carlist War.

== Biography ==
He was the natural son of María Buceta del Villar; he joined the Popular Militia as a first corporal and participated in the First Carlist War as a first sergeant, standing out from the beginning for his liberal attitude. In the Revolution of 1846, he was commander of the Civil Guard and in the company of General Solís he marched towards La Coruña forming part of the first division, made up of the provincial regiments of Gijón and Segovia, an Infantry battalion from Zamora, a company of "Guides of Freedom", 120 carabinieri, 20 horses and two pieces of artillery. But the uprising failed and Miguel Solís Cuetos was shot with others in Carral on 26 April, and Buceta fled disguised as a woman to Portugal.

The following year he was in Madrid participating in the popular liberal movements that were preparing the Revolution of 1848, which he led. He was accused in the press ("El Católico 9-5 of 1848:5) of having assassinated the Captain General of Castilla la Nueva Don José Fulgosio on May 7, 1848. He was arrested and had to choose the path of exile, until in 1850 he was amnestied and returned to active service. He played a very active part in the military uprising of July 1854 that determined the triumph of the Progressive Party and the return of Baldomero Espartero to Spain. Buceta was named colonel and was assigned to the post of Military Governor of the square of Melilla. He achieved important successes fighting the Riffians, who knew him by the nickname of "Farruco".

He was promoted to brigadier and remained as Military Governor of Melilla until 1857, fighting alongside General Leopoldo O'Donnell. He later went to the Caribbean, first to the island of Cuba, and then later, to the nearby country of Dominican Republic, which had come back under Spanish administration as of 1861, as Governor of Samaná, where he carried out very important work among the indigenous population. There he founded the town of "Flechas de Colón," contributing to pacifying the province of Santiago, where several revolts broke out. This would erupt into the Dominican Restoration War, in which Buceta served as Second Corporal of the Province of Santo Domingo.

In 1866, he returned to Madrid. However, several years later, in 1868, the Glorious Revolution took place; Buceta was imprisoned in Peñíscola. Once released he was again posted to Cuba, participating in several military actions and then being named military Governor of Málaga. When he was posted to Gerona in 1873, he was arrested by the Captain General of Catalonia and released at the beginning of the following year. In 1879, while he was the general commander of Campo de Gibraltar and assigned to the reserve, he was proposed three times for lieutenant general, but given the perseverance and ardour with which he always maintained his liberal ideals, his name was rejected.

Buceta died in Málaga, at age 73, far from his native Galicia, on February 3, 1882.

== Bibliography ==
- Great Galician Encyclopedia

== See also ==
- First Carlist War
- Dominican Restoration War
