= Dajabón =

- San Joaquín de Dajabón
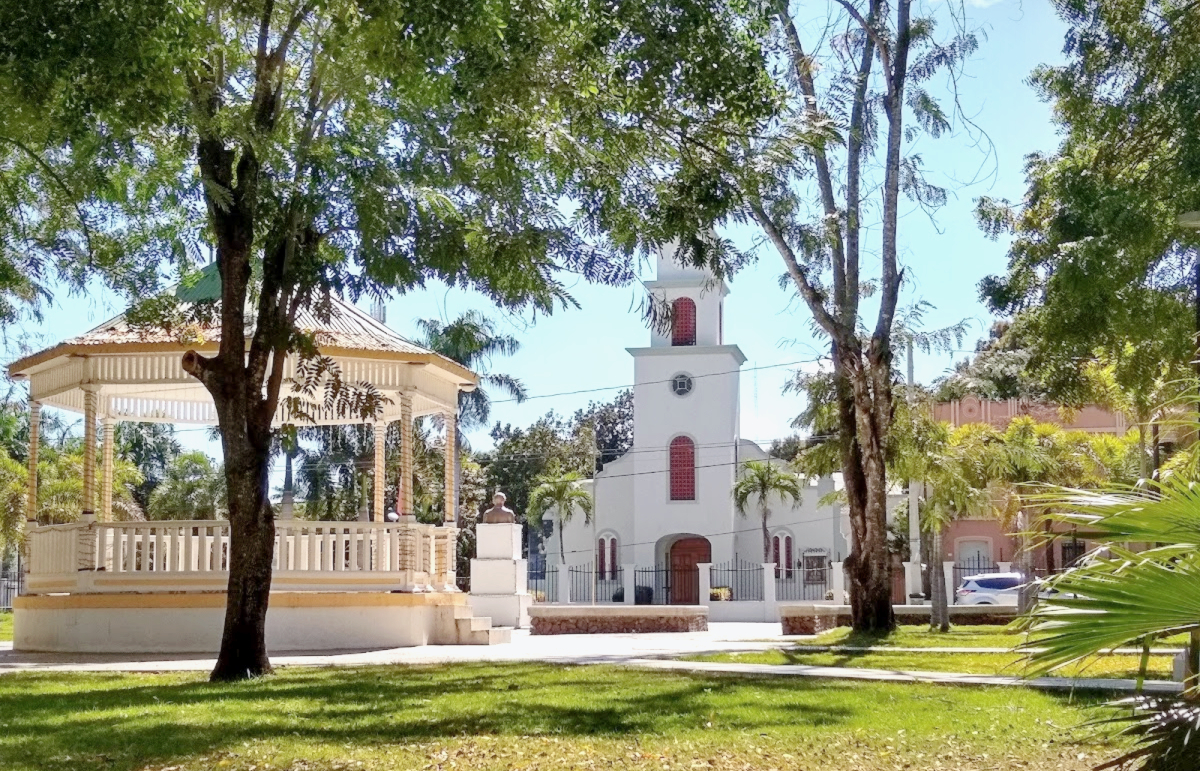
- Dajabón Dominican Republic town church.

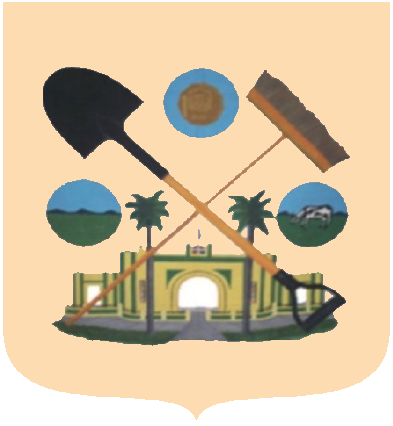
- Coat of arms

- Location within the Dominican Republic
- Coordinates: 19°34′0″N 71°42′36″W
- Country: Dominican Republic
- Province: Dajabón
- Founded: 1776
- Municipality: 1864
- Named for: Dajabón River
- Area: 253.41 km^{2} (97.84 sq mi)
- Elevation: 35 m (115 ft)
- Population (2012): 25,983
  - Density: 102.53/km^{2} (265.56/sq mi)
  - Urban: 18,725
- Including population of Cañongo.
- Climate: Aw

Dajabón (Spanish pronunciation: [daxaˈβon]) is a municipality and capital of the Dajabón province in the Dominican Republic, which is located on the northwestern Dominican Republic frontier with Haiti. It is a market town with a population of about 26,000, north of the Cordillera Central mountain range.

Dajabón is located on the Dajabón River. This river is also known as the Massacre River due to an incident that took place in 1728 in which Spanish settlers killed 30 French Buccaneers. The name also became popular after being the site of the Parsley massacre in 1937, when thousands of Haitians were killed by the Dominican Army under the orders of Rafael Trujillo.

== History ==
A battle took place in what is now Dajabón between the Spanish and the French in the 17th century. At the time of the battle, the governor of the French colony, Mr. Cussy, was killed in the Battle of the Sabana Real de la Limonada, near modern-day Limonade in northern Haiti.

The city was initially founded between 1771 and 1776, but was soon after abandoned during the War of Independence. It was settled again soon after the War of Restoration in 1865.

=== Dajabón Monument ===
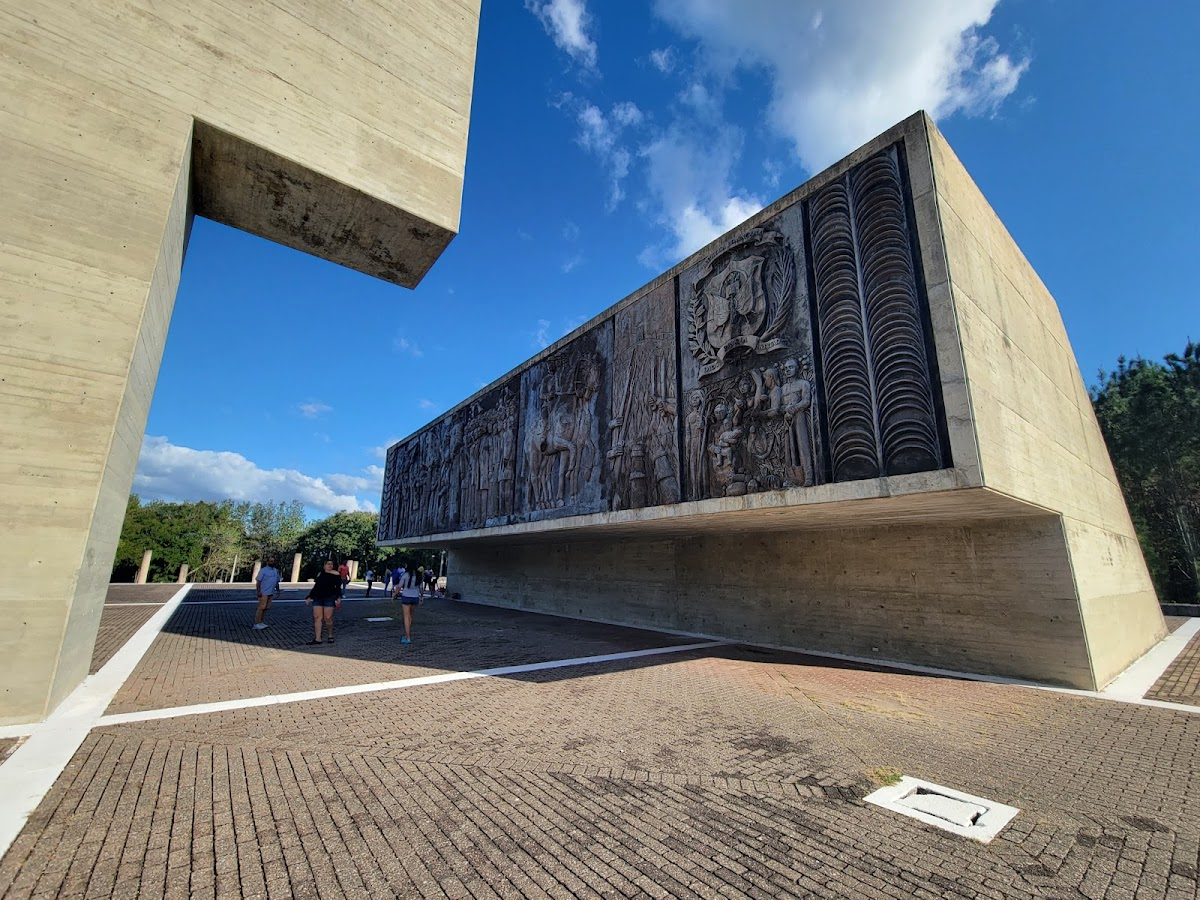

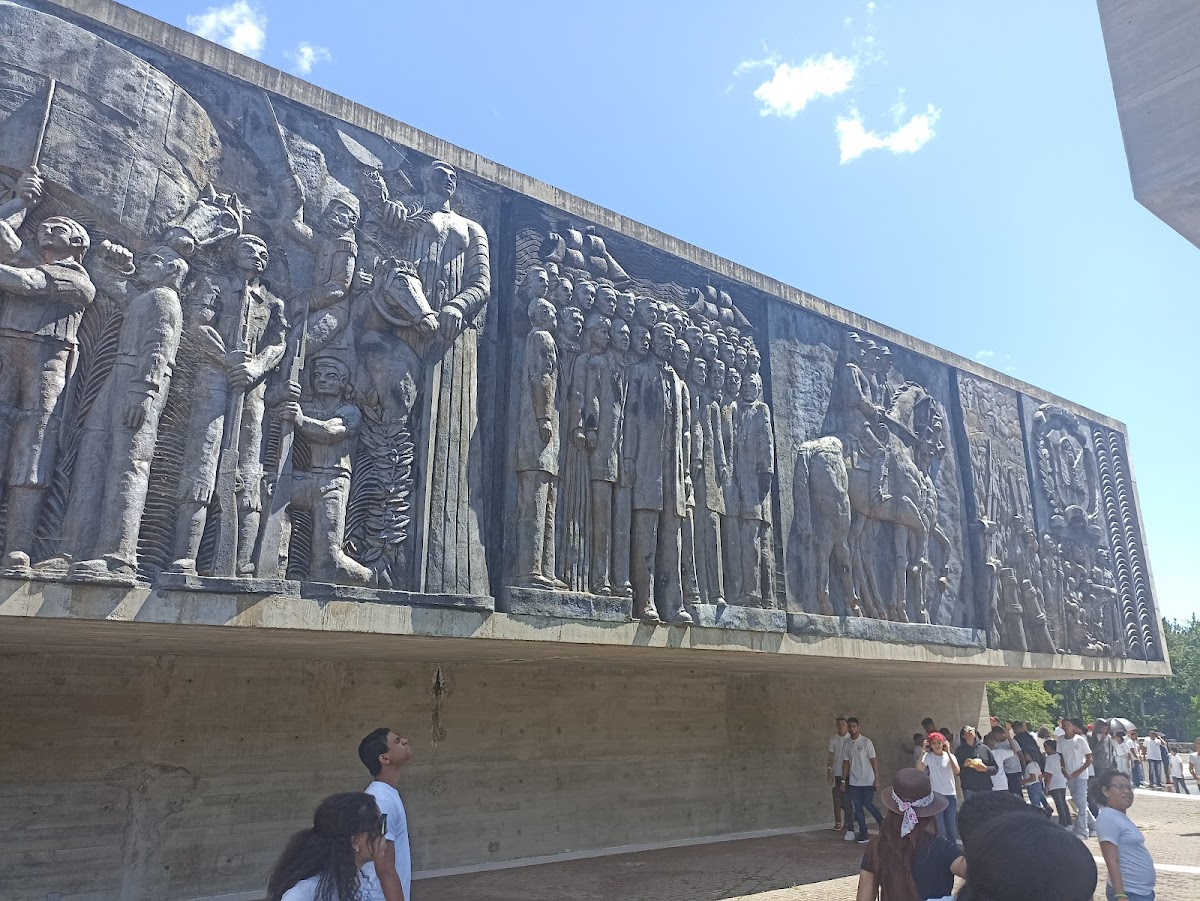

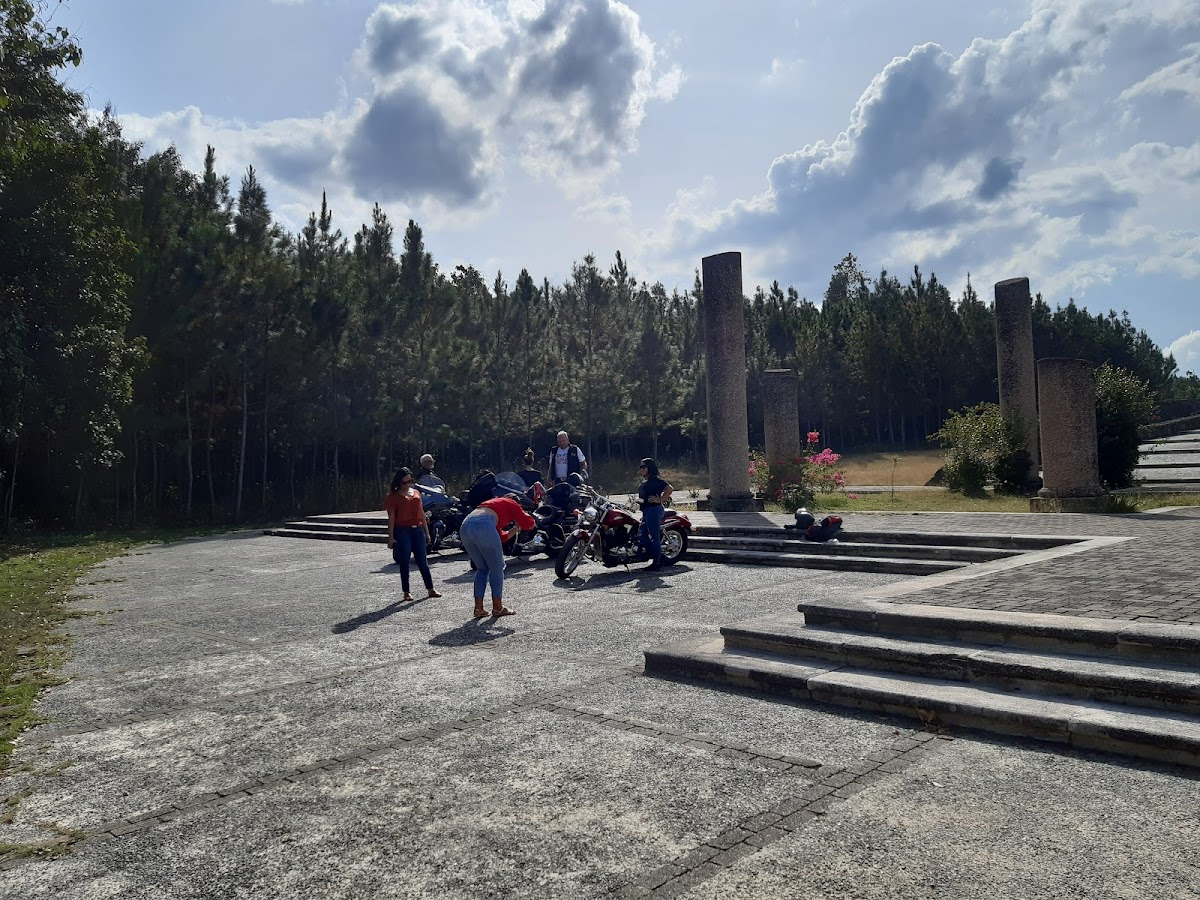

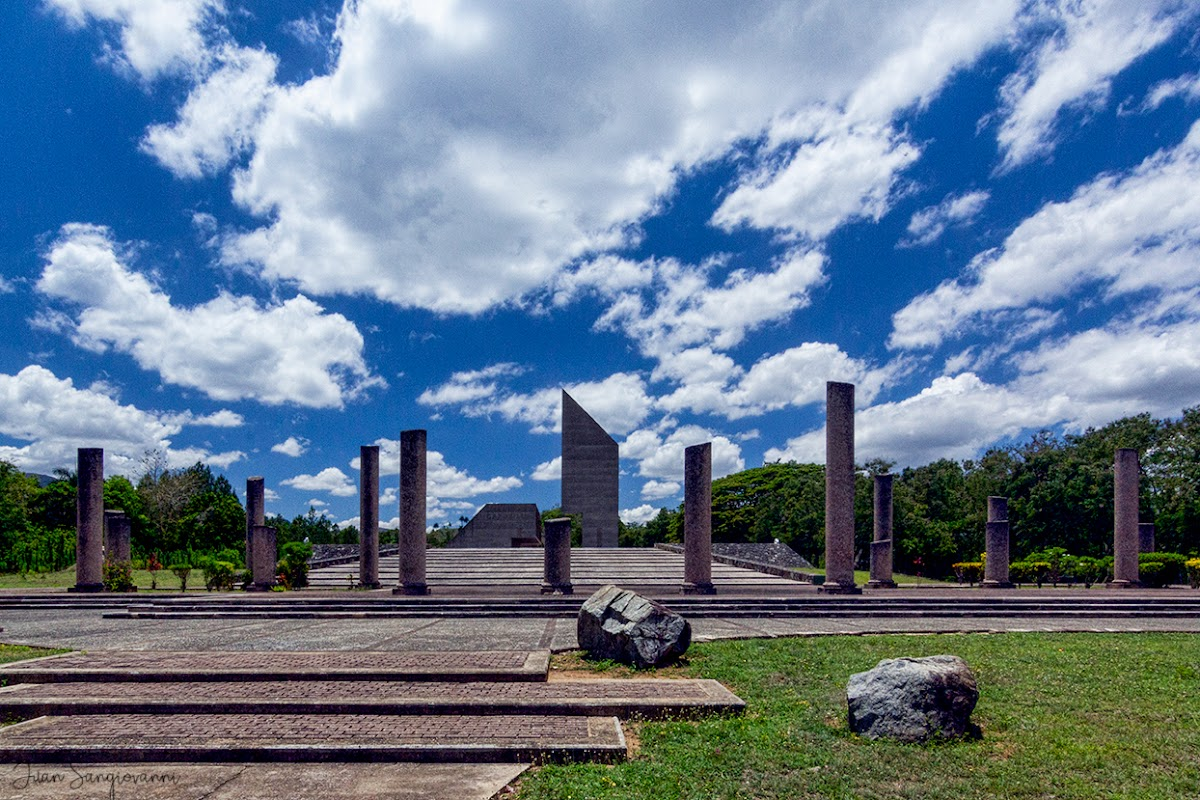

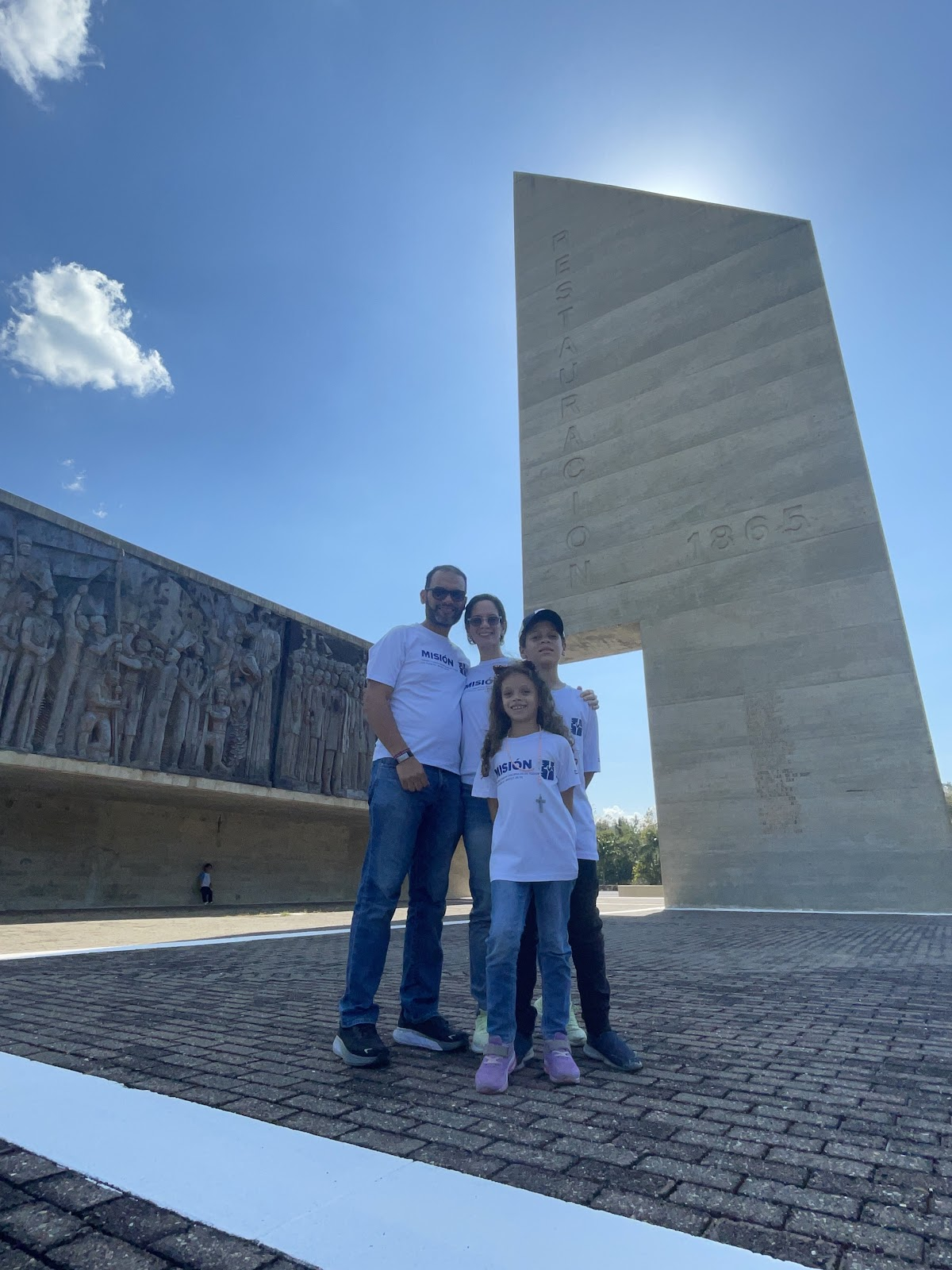

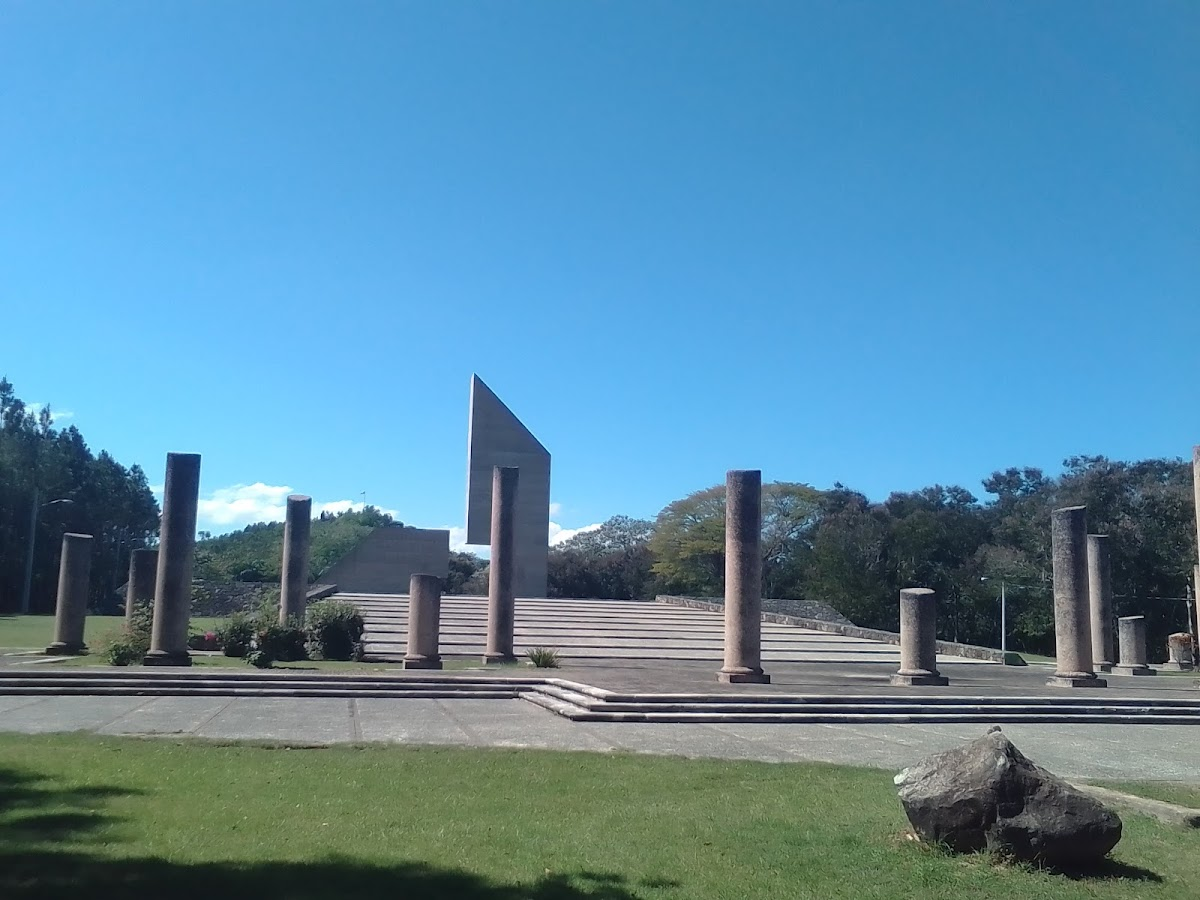

== Population ==
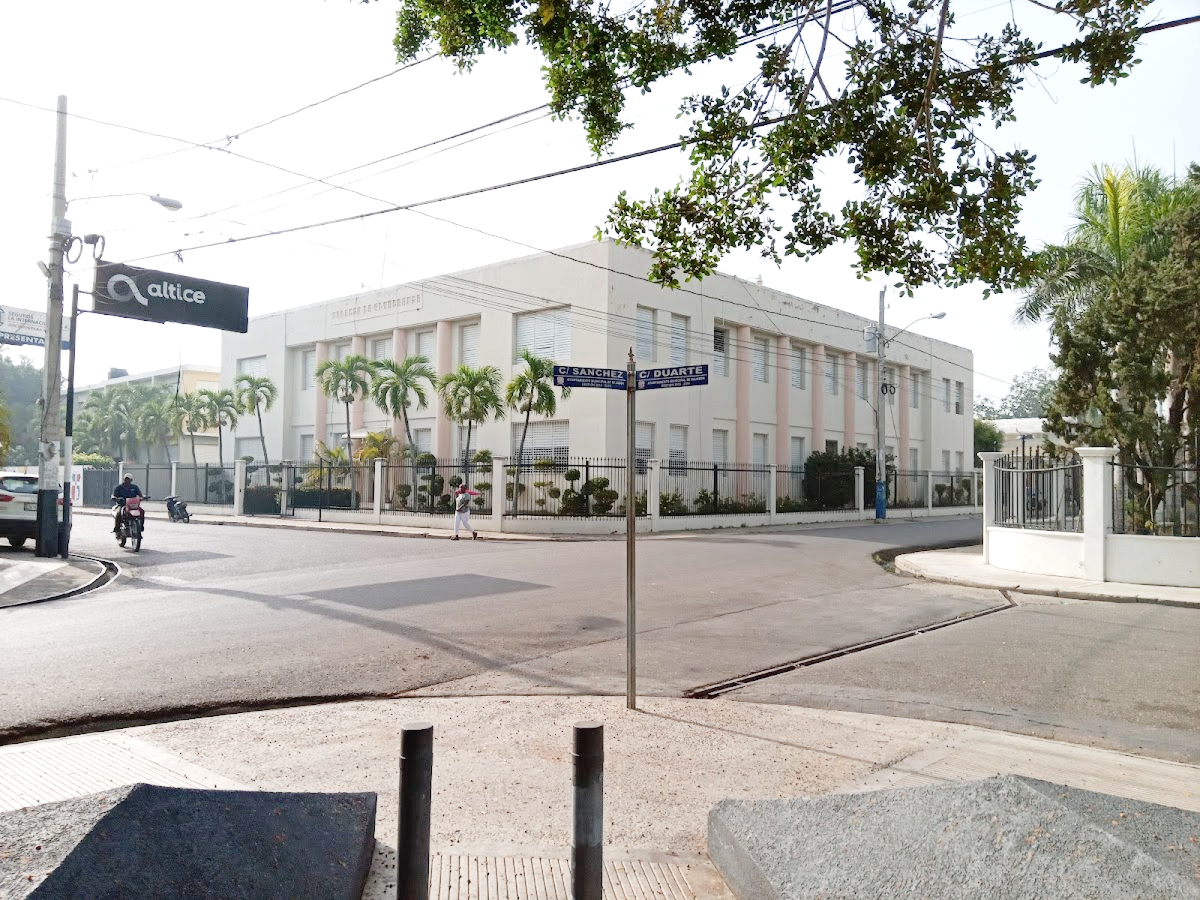
Streets of Dajabón Dominican Republic.

According to the Population and Housing Census, the municipality has a total population of 25,685, of which 12,644 were men and 13,041 women. The urban population of the municipality was 63.57%. This population data includes the population of the Cañongo municipal district.

The bridge across the river connects Dajabón to the Haitian city of Ouanaminthe. On Mondays and Fridays, Haitians are permitted to temporarily cross the bridge to sell their goods. Most of the goods are used clothes, shoes, bulk dry goods, and housewares; an area of several acres on the western edge of the city becomes a crowded business place. In addition to the Haitians, Dominicans go to the market to sell food (vegetables grown in their country).

=== Dajabón Market ===
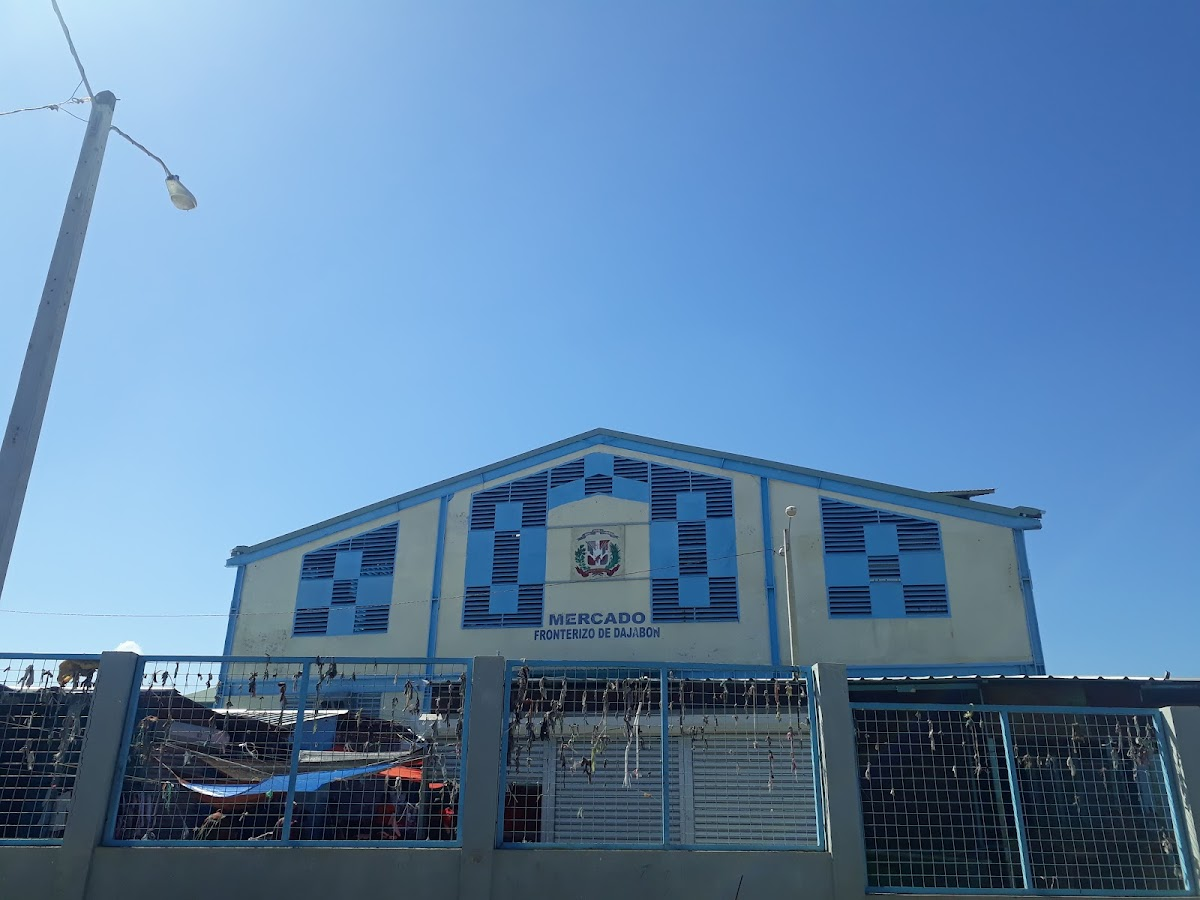

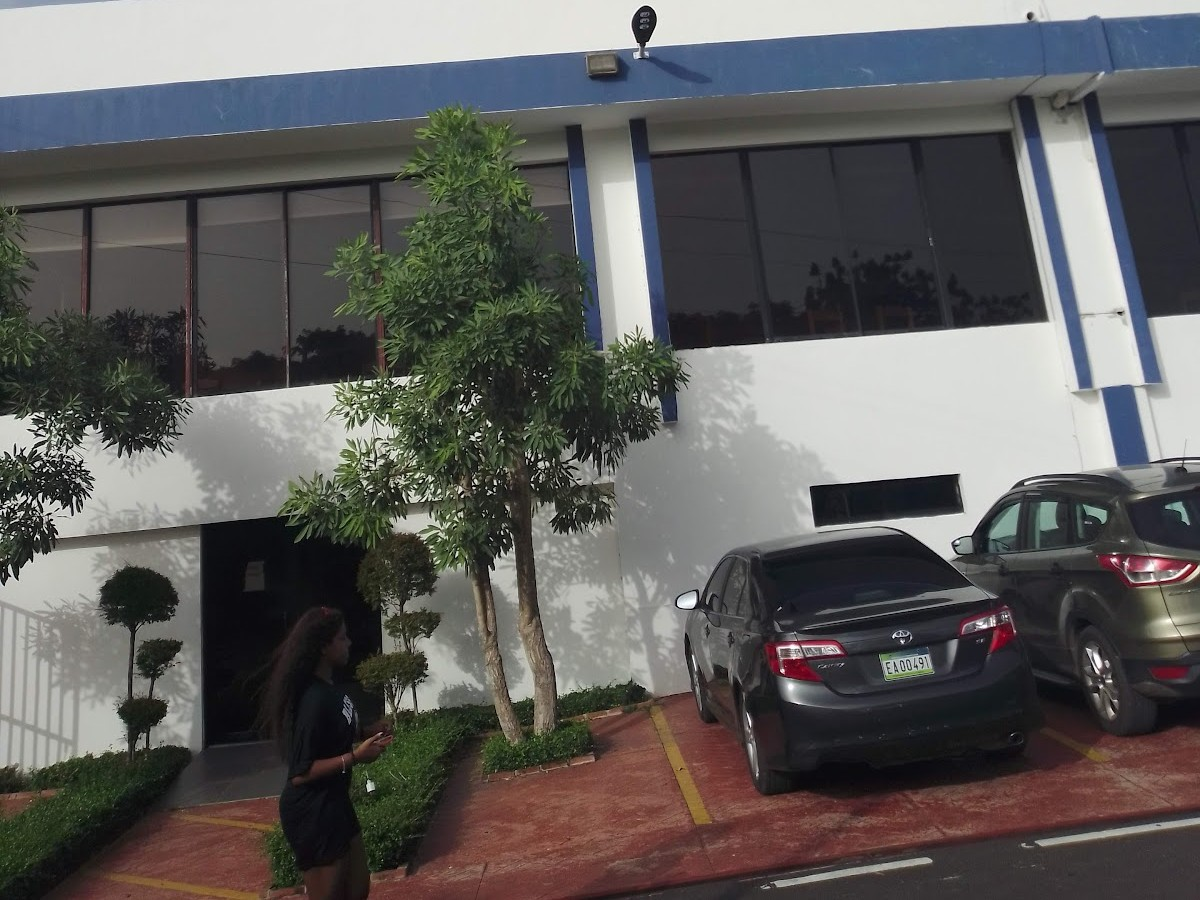

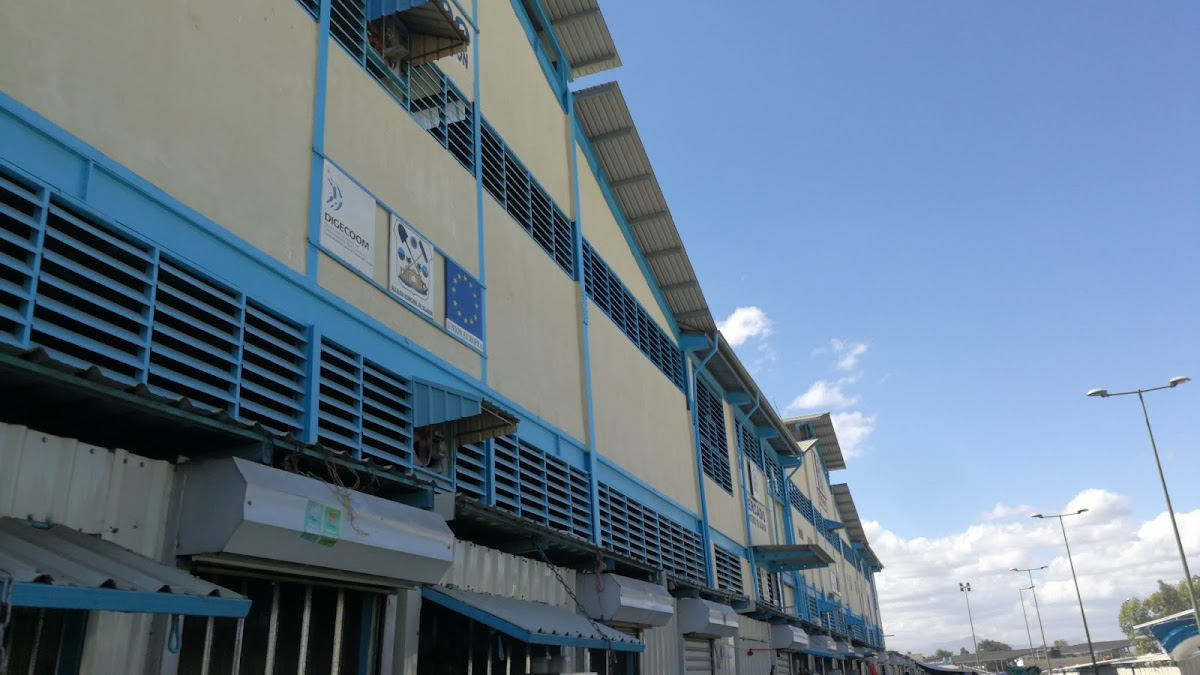

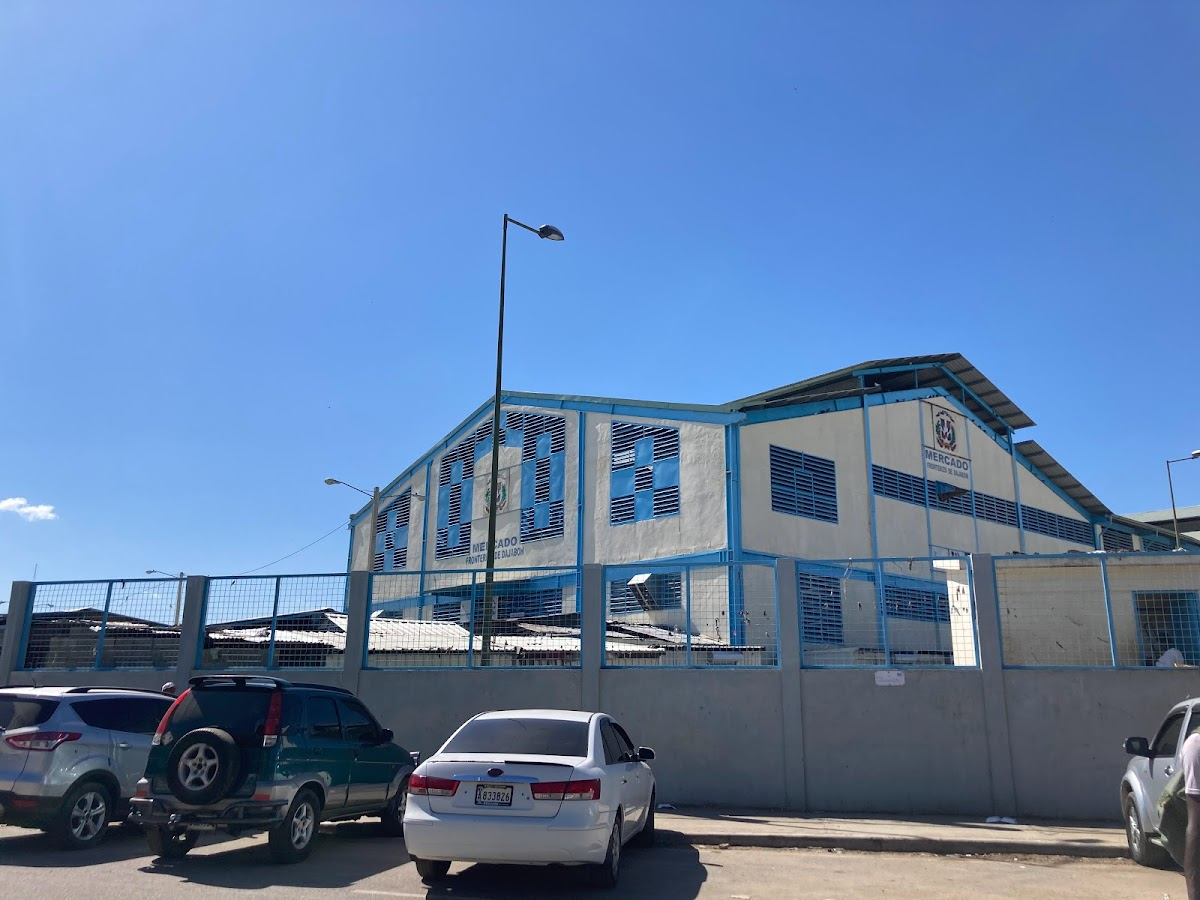

== Climate ==
Dajabón has a hot tropical savanna climate (Köppen Aw).

Climate data for Dajabón (1961-1990)
Month	Jan	Feb	Mar	Apr	May	Jun	Jul	Aug	Sep	Oct	Nov	Dec	Year
Record high °C (°F)	33.5 (92.3)	35.5 (95.9)	38.2 (100.8)	35.4 (95.7)	37.0 (98.6)	36.5 (97.7)	36.5 (97.7)	39.0 (102.2)	37.5 (99.5)	35.2 (95.4)	37.0 (98.6)	35.0 (95.0)	39.0 (102.2)
Mean daily maximum °C (°F)	29.3 (84.7)	29.9 (85.8)	30.6 (87.1)	30.7 (87.3)	31.1 (88.0)	32.3 (90.1)	33.2 (91.8)	33.3 (91.9)	32.9 (91.2)	31.9 (89.4)	30.4 (86.7)	29.2 (84.6)	31.2 (88.2)
Mean daily minimum °C (°F)	17.6 (63.7)	17.9 (64.2)	18.8 (65.8)	19.8 (67.6)	21.0 (69.8)	21.8 (71.2)	21.5 (70.7)	21.7 (71.1)	21.7 (71.1)	21.3 (70.3)	20.0 (68.0)	18.3 (64.9)	20.1 (68.2)
Record low °C (°F)	11.0 (51.8)	11.0 (51.8)	12.5 (54.5)	13.0 (55.4)	14.0 (57.2)	17.5 (63.5)	17.5 (63.5)	16.0 (60.8)	17.0 (62.6)	17.0 (62.6)	13.0 (55.4)	12.0 (53.6)	11.0 (51.8)
Average rainfall mm (inches)	34.0 (1.34)	32.1 (1.26)	48.2 (1.90)	77.6 (3.06)	182.8 (7.20)	161.0 (6.34)	99.9 (3.93)	110.3 (4.34)	149.3 (5.88)	138.7 (5.46)	74.4 (2.93)	59.1 (2.33)	1,167.4 (45.96)
Average rainy days (≥ 1.0 mm)	4.3	2.8	3.5	5.7	10.8	10.8	7.8	8.4	10.7	10.3	6.1	4.1	85.3
Average relative humidity (%)	79.6	78.2	76.6	76.4	79.9	79.9	78.2	78.4	79.7	81.1	80.7	80.0	79.1
Source: NOAA

== Notable residents ==
- Angela Carrasco (born 1951) singer

== Transport ==
The city is served by Dajabón Airport.
