= Pedro Antonio Pimentel =

12th President of the Dominican Republic (1865–1865)

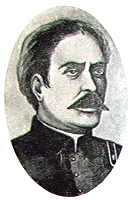
- Illustration of President Pimentel

12th President of the Dominican Republic
- In office 24 March 1865 – 4 August 1865
- Vice President: Benigno Filomeno de Rojas
- Preceded by: Benigno Filomeno de Rojas
- Succeeded by: José María Cabral

Personal details
- Born: 1830 Castañuelas, Dominican Republic
- Died: 1874 (43–44) Quartier-Morin, Haiti

Military service
- Allegiance: Dominican Republic
- Branch/service: Dominican Army
- Years of service: 1840s–1871
- Rank: General
- Battles/wars: Dominican War of Independence; Dominican Restoration War; Six Years' War

Pedro Antonio Pimentel y Chamorro (1830–1874) was a Dominican Republic military figure and politician. He served as the 12th president of the Dominican Republic from March 25, 1865 until August 4, of that year. He also served as governor of Santiago de los Caballeros, Minister of War, and as a deputy of the Congress of the Dominican Republic. He was born to father Jacinto Pimentel and mother Juana Chamorro. He died sick and without any money in Quartier-Morin, Haiti in 1874.

== See also ==
- Dominican Restoration War
- Six Years' War
- Santiago Rodríguez Masagó.

Political offices
Preceded by Pedro Santana	President of the Dominican Republic; 1865	Succeeded by José María Cabral
