= Guayubín =

- Nickname: Cuna de la Restauración
- Location within the Dominican Republic
- Coordinates: 19°37′12″N 71°19′48″W
- Country: Dominican Republic
- Province: Monte Cristi

Area
  - Total: 899.26 km^{2} (347.21 sq mi)

Population (2022)
  - Total: 39,653
  - Density: 44.095/km^{2} (114.21/sq mi)
  - Urban: 11,748
- Municipal Districts: 3

Guayubín is a town and municipality in the Monte Cristi province of the Dominican Republic. It is Monte Cristi's second-largest town. The municipality had a population of 39,653 in 2022.

They hold annual festivities from August 1 until about August 10, where they celebrate their saint, which is San Lorenzo (Saint Lawrence). Each festivity is filled with music, live activities including softball, volleyball and baseball tournaments and performances by recognized artists and comedians as well as a designated trio of queens (juvenil, internacional and infantil—juvenile, international and children's) along with a vice-queen, princess, ambassador, etc. for each queen who are chosen by the residents or by the organizing committee.

== Notable Person ==
- Aquilino Gonell, officer of the United States Capitol Police during the January 6 attack.

== Sources ==
- – World-Gazetteer.com
