= Dominican Restoration War =

1863–1865 war between the Dominican Republic and Spain

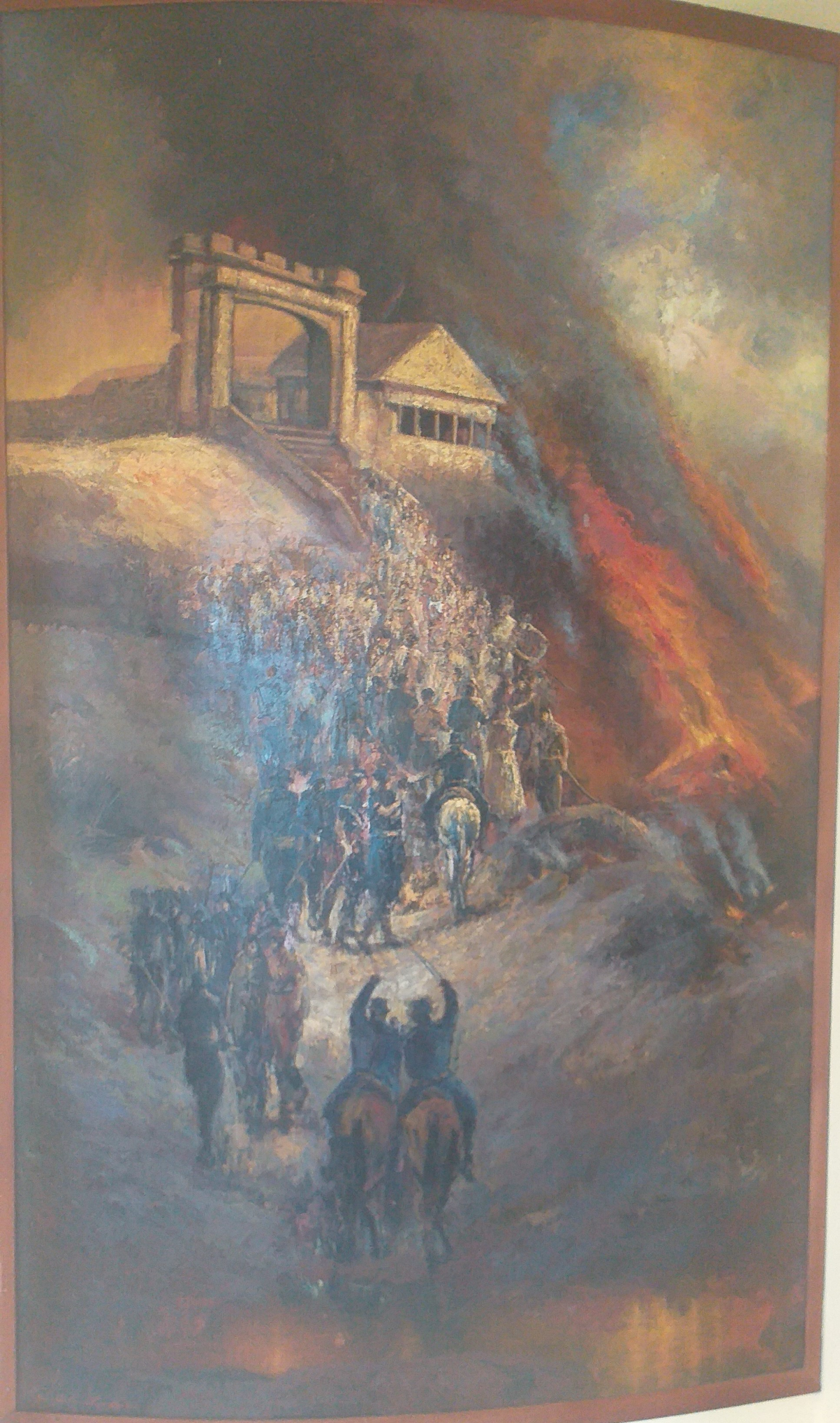
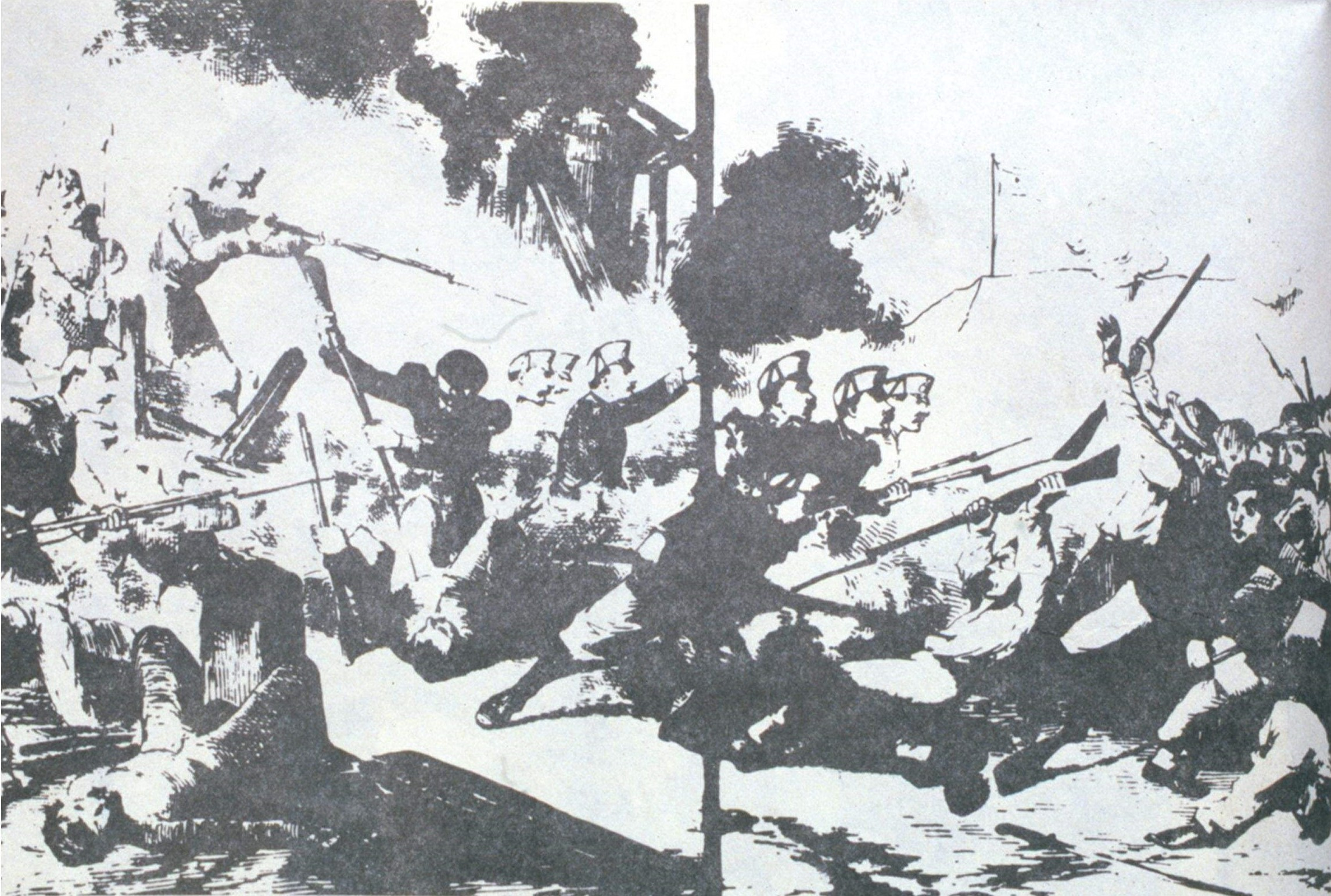
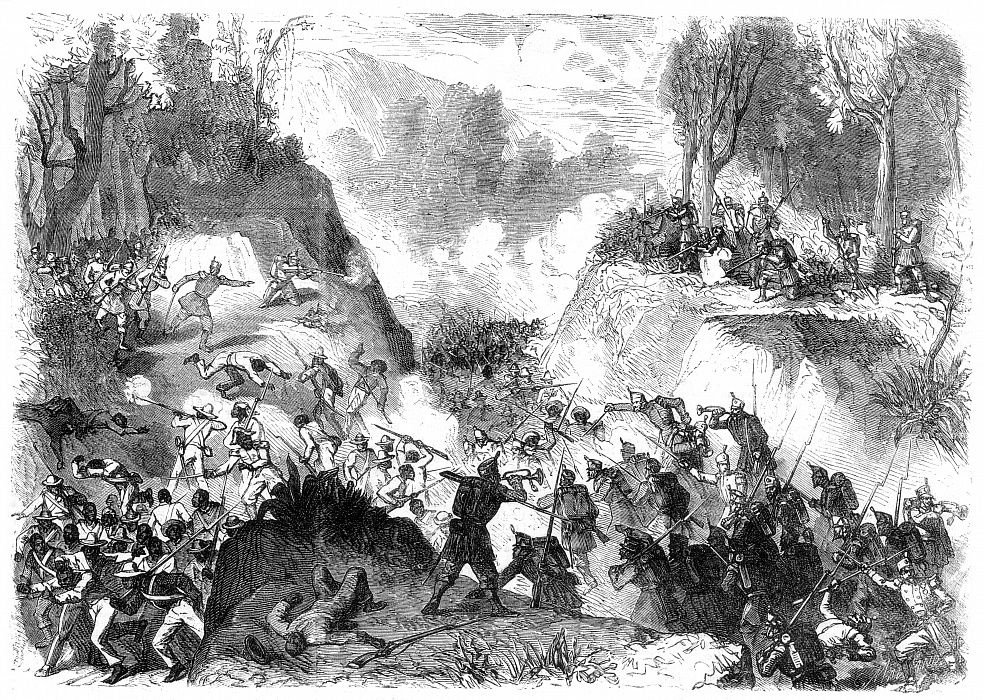
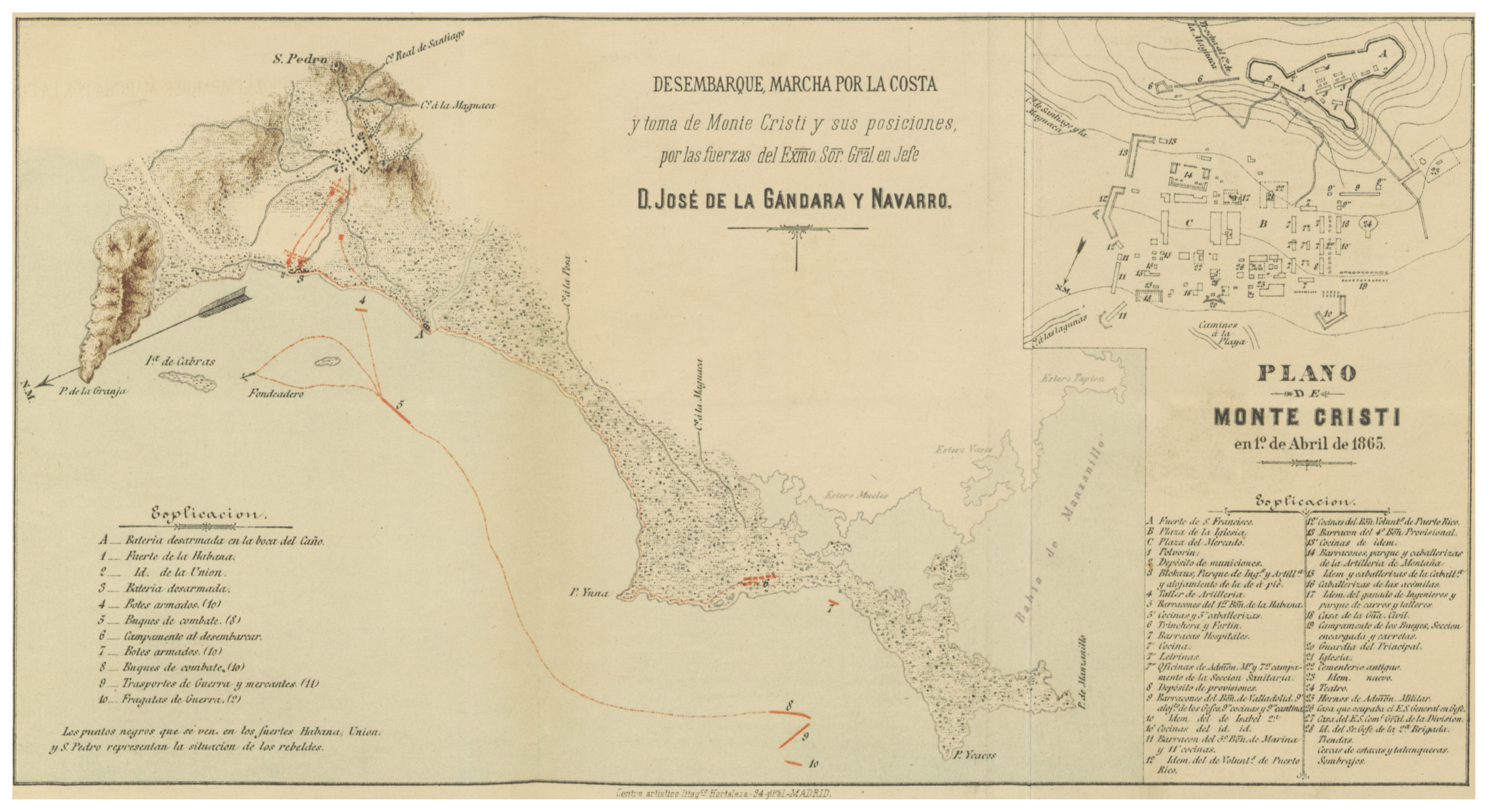
- Clockwise from top left: Burning of the San Luis Fortress, the Battle of Santiago (1863), Dominican Mambi ambush on a Spanish battalion, José de la Gándara's Plan of Monte Cristi (1865), and the Battle of Monte Cristi
Date	16 August 1863 – 15 July 1865 (1 year, 10 months, 4 weeks and 1 day)
Location	Dominican Republic
Result	Dominican victory: Restoration of Dominican sovereignty; Withdrawal of Spanish forces; Separation of the Captaincy General of Santo Domingo from Spain; Establishment of the Second Republic

Belligerents
Dominican Republic	Spain

Commanders and leaders
(Dominican Republic) José Antonio Salcedo X; (Dominican Republic) Gaspar Polanco; (Dominican Republic) Gregorio Luperón; (Dominican Republic) Santiago Rodríguez; (Dominican Republic) Pedro Antonio Pimentel; (Dominican Republic) José María Cabral; (Dominican Republic) Pedro Florentino X	(Spain) Pedro Santana; (Spain) José de la Gándara; (Spain) Carlos de Vargas; (Spain) Carlos Palanca Gutiérrez; (Spain) Manuel Buceta

Strength
15,000–17,000	30,000 Spanish; 12,000 Dominican auxiliaries

Casualties and losses
4,000 dead 38 artillery pieces captured	10,888 killed or wounded in action 12,000 dead from disease 10,000 Dominican auxiliaries (battle casualties and disease deaths)

The Dominican Restoration War or the Dominican War of Restoration (Spanish: Guerra de la Restauración), called War of Santo Domingo in Spain (Guerra de Santo Domingo), was a guerrilla war between 1863 and 1865 in the Dominican Republic between Dominican nationalists and Spain, the latter of which had recolonized the country 17 years after its independence. It ended with the withdrawal of Spanish forces from the island.

The war began with Dominican forces crossing the border from Haiti and pushing through enemy positions in the north and central regions. After setting up a government in Santiago, they expanded guerrilla operations in the south and east. Both sides sought to take the other's key city: Dominicans aimed for Santo Domingo, Spaniards for Santiago, but control remained contested until the Spanish withdrew.

== Background ==
General Pedro Santana had wrested the presidency from Buenaventura Báez, who had bankrupted the nation's treasury at great profit to himself. Faced with an economic crisis as well as the possibility of renewed attack from Haiti, Santana asked Spain to retake control of the country, after a period of only 17 years of independence. Spain was wary at first, but since the U.S. was occupied with its own civil war and thus unable to enforce the Monroe Doctrine, Spain felt it had an opportunity to reassert control in Latin America. On March 18, 1861, the annexation was announced, and Santana became Governor-General of the newly created province.

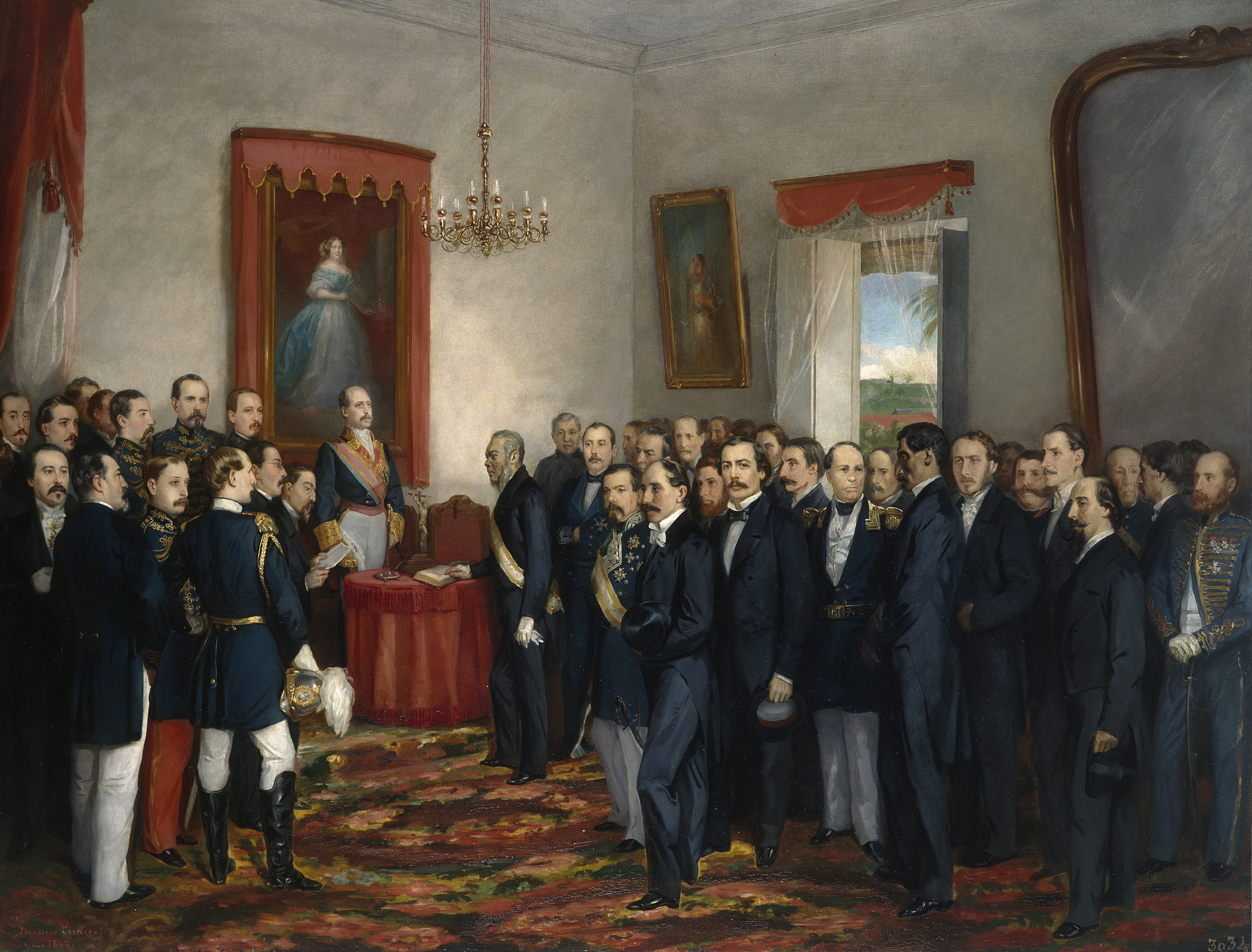
Pedro Santana is sworn in as governor-general of the re-established Captaincy General of Santo Domingo.

However, this act was not well received by everyone. On May 2, General José Contreras led a failed rebellion, and Francisco del Rosario Sánchez led an invasion from Haiti (who were officially neutral, but also concerned about Spain flexing its muscles in the area), but he was captured and executed on July 4, 1861. Santana himself did not fare well under the new regime. He discovered that he was unable to wield the same amount of power under Spanish rule as he could as president of an independent nation, and resigned his post in January 1862.

Spanish officials began to alienate the general population by instituting a policy known as bagajes, which required citizens to hand over any work animals to the Spanish military upon demand without any guarantee of compensation. That was especially problematic in the Cibao region in the north, where farmers depended on their animals for their livelihoods. A second factor was cultural: the new archbishop from Spain was appalled to find that a large number of Dominican couples were not married within the Catholic Church. That situation had come about by a small number of priests in the country, as well as poverty and the lack of roads and transportation to get to a church for marriage. With the best of intentions, Archbishop Bienvenido de Monzón wanted to rectify this situation within a short time, but his demands only irritated the local population, which had come to accept the current state of illegitimate births as normal.

Economically, the new government also imposed higher tariffs on non-Spanish goods and ships and attempted to establish a monopoly on tobacco, thus alienating the merchant classes as well. By late 1862, Spanish officials were beginning to fear the possibility of rebellion in the Cibao region (anti-Spanish feelings were not as strong in the south). Lastly, despite explicit statements to the contrary, rumors spread that Spain would re-institute slavery and ship black Dominicans to Cuba and Puerto Rico.

Meanwhile, Spain had issued a royal order in January 1862 declaring its intent to regain the territories that Toussaint Louverture had taken for Haiti in 1794. In attempting to quell disturbances in Santo Domingo, Spanish troops had evicted Haitians living in these areas along the Haitian–Dominican border. Haitian President Fabre Geffrard gave up his position of neutrality and began to aid the Dominican rebels.

== War ==
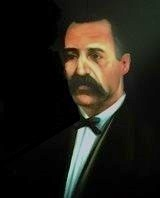
Santiago Rodríguez

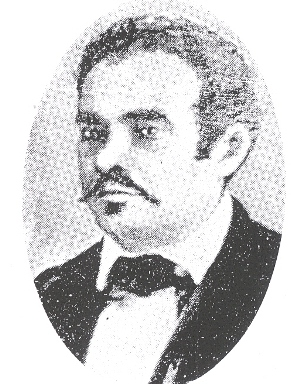
Gaspar Polanco, Commander-in-Chief of the Battle of Santiago

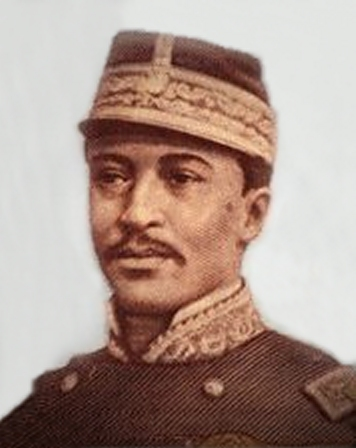
Gregorio Luperón

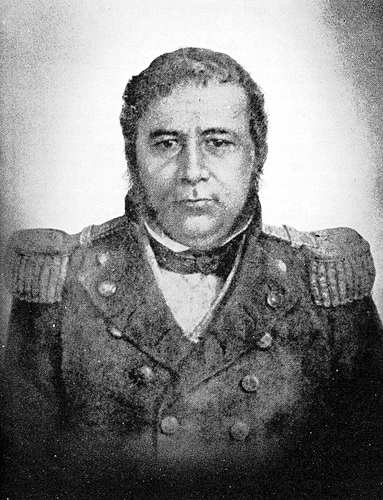
Pedro Santana

On August 16, 1863, a new group under the leadership of Santiago Rodríguez made a daring raid on Capotillo near Dajabón and raised the new Dominican flag on the Capotillo hill. This action, known as El grito de Capotillo, was the beginning of the war.

Town after town in Cibao joined the rebellion, and on September 3, a force of 6,000 Dominicans besieged Fort San Luis and its 800 Spanish soldiers in Santiago, burning the city. The Spanish garrison, along with 2,000 reinforcements, evacuated the fort on September 13. The rebels established a new government the following day, with José Antonio Salcedo as self-appointed president, and immediately denounced Santana, who was now leading the Spanish forces, as a traitor. Salcedo attempted to engage the U.S. for assistance but was rebuffed. Spain had a difficult time fighting the rebels. Over the course of the war, they would spend over 33 million pesos and suffer over 10,000 casualties (much of it due to yellow fever). By March 1864, the Spanish had suffered 1,000 killed in action and 9,000 dead from disease.

After the destruction of Santiago, the Spaniards marched towards Puerto Plata. Throughout their march, they were attacked by the Dominicans, resulting in a loss of 1,200 killed and wounded among the Spanish troops. Upon reaching Puerto Plata, they joined forces with the garrison in the fort, leaving the town vulnerable to pillaging by the rebels. The Spanish soldiers in the forts of Puerto Plata and Samaná faced deteriorating conditions. The onset of the rainy season brought widespread sickness. Meanwhile, the Dominicans bombarded Puerto Plata. On October 4, 1863, both the Spaniards and Dominicans pillaged the town. A fight ensued, with 600 Spaniards ultimately driving 1,000 Dominicans out of the town, aided by grapeshot from the fort. One account claimed the Spaniards suffered 450 casualties.

In December 1863, Spanish forces captured Azua on the southern seacoast after two months of fighting and heavy casualties. The towns of Baní, Barahona, Neiba, and San Juan fell to the Spanish without resistance, and most insurgents disbanded. During their retreat toward Bánica, the surviving rebel group led by Pedro Florentino executed 35 Spanish prisoners with bullets and cutlasses. On December 9, Dominican guerrillas captured an 80-mule Spanish supply train carrying ammunition and repelled 1,200 Spaniards marching from Santo Domingo to capture San Cristóbal, inflicting 200 killed and wounded. Dominicans continued to hold San Cristóbal, cutting Spanish land communications. They captured 200 Spanish soldiers along with 300 rifles, 40,000 cartridges, and a field gun from Santana's army supply depot. On December 20, an engagement at Puerto Plata resulted in the Spanish being defeated with 150 men killed and a cannon captured by the Dominicans.

Santana made unsuccessful efforts to force his way into Cibao, and there was much yellow fever and malaria among his troops. In March 1864, he pointedly disobeyed orders to concentrate his forces around Santo Domingo and was rebuked and relieved of his command by Governor-General José de la Gándara, who ordered Santana to Cuba in order to face a court-martial. However, Santana died suddenly before that happened.

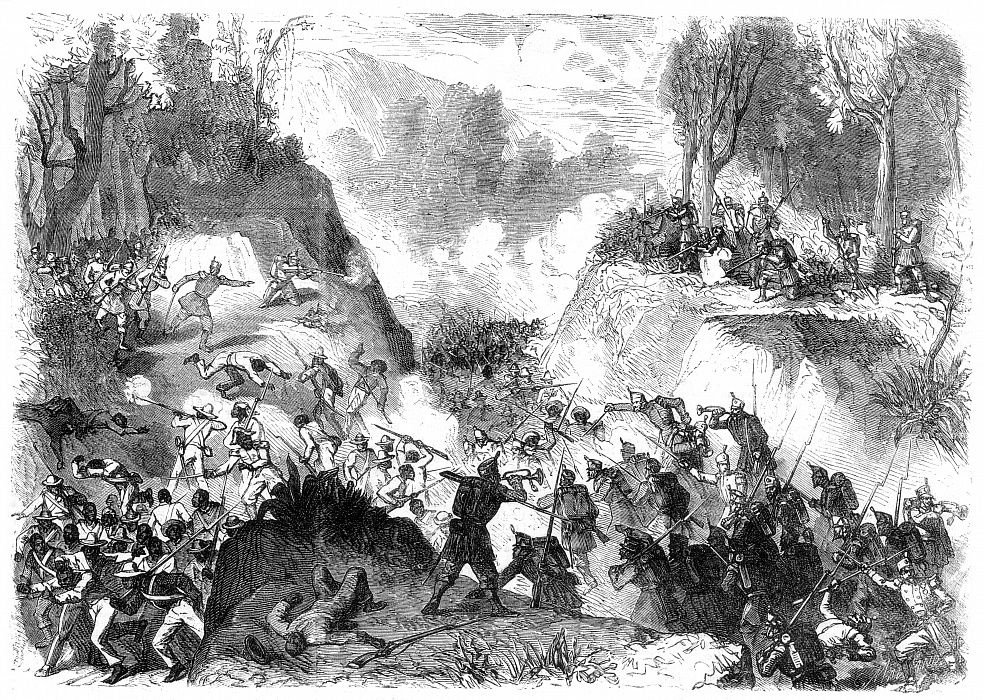
Battle of Monte Cristi

On March 27, 1864, the Dominicans attacked a fortified church in Puerto Plata but were repulsed by Spanish troops under Brigadier Carlos Palanca Gutiérrez, resulting in 200 Dominicans killed. The Spanish suffered only 3 killed and 25 wounded. Rumors circulated that the Spanish troops suffered from a lack of tents. Dysentery and malaria took a significant toll on the troops, especially native Spanish soldiers, with reports suggesting up to 1,500 per month lost to disease. In May 1864, the Spanish made significant progress along the northern coast, capturing the town of Monte Cristi, which was fortified with forts and trenches. In October 1864, the New York Times reported that more than 12,000 Spanish soldiers had perished during the conflict. On December 4, 1864, southern forces, commanded by José María Cabral, defeated the Spanish in a battle in Neiba. That marked the first time that the Dominicans had emerged victorious against the Spanish in a conventional battle.

Dominican forces faced shortages of weapons and ammunition, which they obtained through trade: exchanging tobacco in the Turks Islands for cannons and rifles, trading with Haiti for gunpowder and lead, which they used to make bullets in Santiago, and, in the south, trading livestock and pack animals for munitions. By late 1864, Spanish forces could not prevent the Dominicans from raiding supply convoys even near Santo Domingo.

La Gándara attempted to broker a ceasefire with the rebels. He and Salcedo agreed to discuss peace terms, but in the middle of negotiations, Salcedo was overthrown and assassinated by the disaffected group of Restoration commanders, led by Gaspar Polanco. Polanco was concerned that Salcedo was taking negligent actions against the Spanish authorities, made numerous costly military mistakes and was planning to recall former pro-annexation president Buenaventura Báez, whom the rebels hated as much as they hated the Spanish for his actions before Santana's July 1857 coup. Although Báez had initially opposed Spanish annexation, once it began he lived in Spain on a government subsidy and had the honorary rank of field marshal in the Spanish Army. It was not until near the end of the war that he returned to the Dominican Republic.

In Spain, the war was proving to be extremely unpopular. Combined with other political crises that were happening, it contributed to the downfall of Spanish Prime Minister Leopoldo O'Donnell in 1866. The Spanish Minister of War ordered the cessation of military operations on the island, and the new prime minister Ramón María Narváez brought the issue before the Cortes Generales.

Polanco's reign was short-lived. After an ill-fated attack on the Spanish position in Monte Cristi and efforts to establish a tobacco monopoly on behalf of his friends, he himself was overthrown by a movement supported by his own brother General Juan Antonio Polanco, Pedro Antonio Pimentel and Benito Moncion who appointed Benigno Filomeno de Rojas as president and Gregorio Luperón as vice-president in January 1865. Given the respite in fighting, the provisional junta organized a new constitution, and when that was adopted, General Pedro Antonio Pimentel became the new president effective March 25, 1865.

The outcome of the American Civil War was no longer in serious doubt. On the other side of the Atlantic, the Cortes now had to consider the probability of eventual U.S. intervention and decided that it did not want to fund a war for a territory that it did not really need. On March 3, 1865, Queen Isabella II signed the annulment of the annexation. By July 15, there were no more Spanish troops left on the island.

Altogether, Spain's army of 51,000 troopers plus 12,000 Dominican auxiliares was defeated by the Dominican liberal army of 15,000 men. Everything indicated that the Spanish occupation would succeed, but the unexpected yellow fever epidemic killed thousand of Spanish troops, with up to 10,000 casualties at the end of the war.

== Aftermath ==
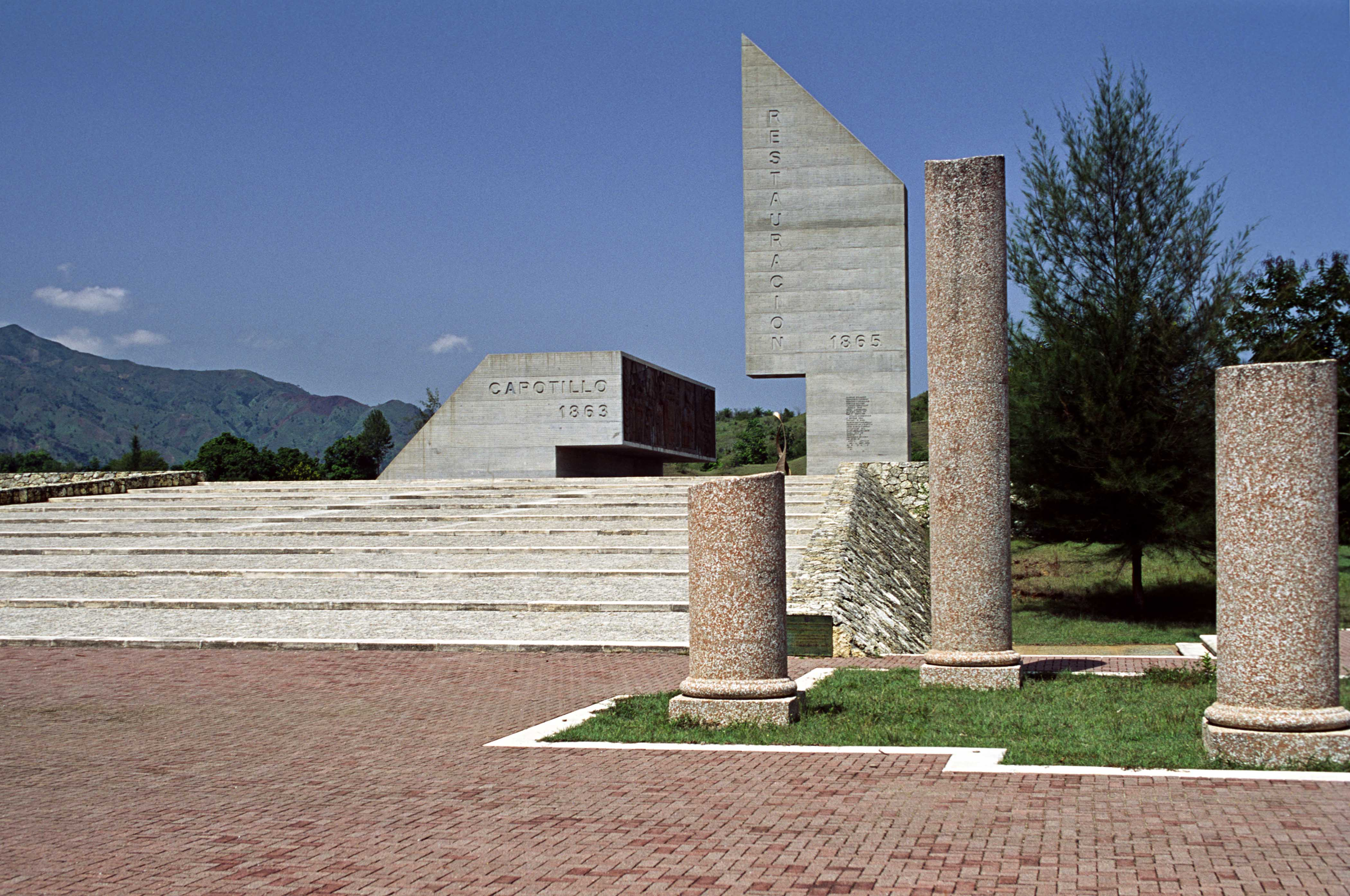
Monument to the Dominican War of Restoration

Although many Dominican cities were destroyed and agriculture (apart from tobacco) across the country halted during the war years, the War of Restoration brought a new level of national pride to the Dominican Republic. The Dominican victory also showed nationalists in Cuba and Puerto Rico that Spain could be defeated. On the other hand, in local politics, leadership during the war was concentrated in the hands of a few regional caudillos, or strongmen, who could command the loyalty of the regions and were more intent on bettering themselves and their followers than the nation as a whole. That system of political power persisted until the late 20th century. Dominican politics remained unstable for the next several years. Pimentel was president for only five months before he was replaced by José María Cabral. Cabral in turn was ousted by Buenaventura Báez in December 1865, but retook the presidency in May 1866. His negotiations with the United States about the possible sale of land around Samaná Bay proved to be so unpopular that Báez was able to regain the presidency once more in 1868.

In intra-island relations, the war marked a new level of co-operation between Haiti and the Dominican Republic. Until then, Haiti had considered the island of Hispaniola to be "indivisible" and had attempted to conquer the eastern half several times. The war forced Haiti to realize that goal was essentially unattainable, and it was instead replaced by years of border disputes between the two countries.

August 16 is commemorated a national holiday in the Dominican Republic, as well as the day the Dominican president is sworn into office every four years.

== See also ==
- Spanish reconquest of Santo Domingo
- Dominican War of Independence
- Six Years' War

== Bibliography ==
- Schenoni, Luis L. (2024). Bringing War Back In: Victory, Defeat, and the State in Nineteenth-Century Latin America. Cambridge: Cambridge University Press. doi:10.1017/9781009442145. ISBN 9781009442145.
