= Timoteo Ogando =

Dominican military commander (1818–1908)

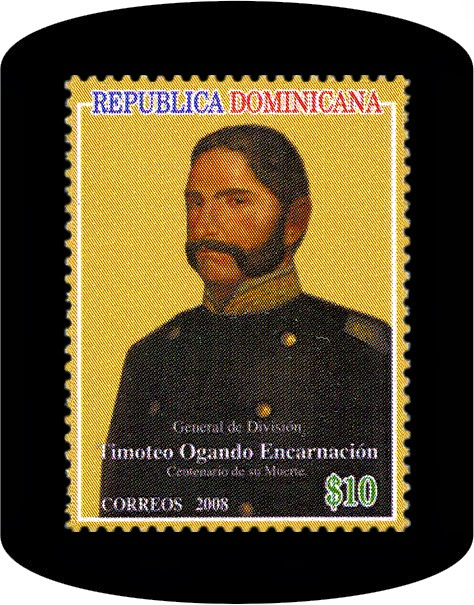
- 2008 post stamp of Timoteo Ogando
- Born: July 31, 1818; Pedro Corto, Captaincy General of Santo Domingo
- Died: June 11, 1908 (aged 89) Santo Domingo, Dominican Republic
- Buried: National Pantheon of the Dominican Republic
- Allegiance: Dominican Republic
- Branch: Dominican Army
- Service years: 1844–1908
- Rank: General
- Conflicts: Dominican War of Independence; Dominican Restoration War; Six Years' War
- Awards: National hero

Timoteo Ogando Encarnación (July 31, 1818 – June 11, 1908) was a Dominican general and politician. In his lifetime, his activism spanned throughout seven different decades, including during the decades of conflict against Haiti, Spain and the United States. This gives him the distinction of holding the longest military career of the 19th and 20th century in the Dominican Republic.

== Early years ==
He was born in Pedro Corto, (in the province of present day San Juan) on July 31, 1818. His parents, (both Dominicans of Spanish descent), were Juan Ogando Montero and María Catalina Encarnación (May Talina), who had 14 children: 12 boys and 2 girls. All of his siblings participated in the wars against Haiti and Spain.

== Leader for independence ==
At just 23 years of age, together with his 21-year-old brother Andrés, they enlisted in the ranks of General Francisco Moreno to participate in struggles of the Dominican War of Independence. On December 22, 1855, he participated in the Battle of Santomé, led by General José María Cabral. Due to his military qualities and personal courage during the week that lasted, he was promoted to captain of the Liberation Army.

Recognized as a man of arms in his region, he joined in June 1861, the call to arms made by the exiled patriot, Francisco del Rosario Sánchez, together with José María Cabral for the Dominicans to join the fight against the annexation to Spain, carried out in March of that year by President Pedro Santana.

With Haitian support for the Dominican cause withdrawn due to the political maneuvers of the Spanish before President Fabre Geffrard, the patriots under the command of Sánchez and Cabral had crossed the border through the San Juan Valley. Sánchez decided to enter Haiti, he commissioned Ogando to evacuate the wounded, while he and his men protected the rear. However, upon reaching El Cercado, Sánchez was ambushed by a group of locals led by General Santiago de Óleo; Upon hearing the shots, Ogando ordered the convoy of wounded to continue forward and immediately returned to the scene. He found Sánchez wounded and offered to carry him on the back of his horse, but he refused, instead preferring to die alongside his companions. Sánchez was arrested and shot on July 4, 1861. Ogando managed to save the life of the Februaryist Juan Pablo Pina, who was a friend of Juan Pablo Duarte, and other combatants, sending them to Haiti, due to his skill as a horseman along with his knowledge of the roads of the region. Cabral also managed to save his life by taking refuge in Haiti.

Retired in Haiti, Ogando waited for the outbreak of the Dominican Restoration War to immediately join it, doing the entire southern campaign and reaching the rank of General. He participated in the Battle of La Canela, the last of the battle until he was wounded on December 5, 1864.

== Later career ==
After the Dominican Republic's independence was restored, Ogando allied himself with Cabral. He was the first to rebel against Buenaventura Báez's authoritarian regime, when he had barely been in power for a month. Both Andrés and he, carrying the rank of generals, were preponderant factors in this war that culminated in the fall of the dictator Báez. Along with Cabral, they participated in the battles of Yaque del Sur and Viajama, the hills of Baní and San Cristóbal. In Las Matas de Farfán, with only 30 men commanded by Cabral, they defeated Carlos Báez, brother of the President who had 700 well-armed men.

Báez was deposed in 1874, he supported the government of Ignacio María González and was part of his entourage when he visited Cibao in the middle of that year. In August he participated in the beginning of the revolutionary movement that began in Santiago with the assault on the San Luis fortress. After González's attempt to arrest Gregorio Luperón, members of the liberal party (or blues), grouped in the patriotic association Liga de la Paz and those of the Amantes de la Luz society, accused the President of having violated the Constitution and of embezzlement of public funds.

While waiting for Congress to hear the complaint, liberals and Baecistas (reds), wishing to avoid a civil war, agreed to propose to González that they would withdraw the accusation in exchange for his resignation, which he made effective in February 1876. He continued to be faithful to González, conspiring against the government of Fernando Arturo de Meriño, who became president on July 23, 1880. Pursued by government troops, he had to abandon his residence for several months.

He achieved the greatest political preeminence in the governments of Ulises Heureaux. After he was assassinated in 1899, he offered his services to President Horacio Vásquez, who sent him to Montecristi to quell a revolt on the Northwest Line.

In 1902, Ogando, at the old age of 84, he led a group of Dominicans in civil war that gave rise to the presidency of Pierre Nord Alexis in Haiti.

He died on June 11, 1908, at the age of 89, in Santo Domingo.

== See also ==
- Francisco del Rosario Sánchez
- José María Cabral
- Ignacio María González

== Bibliography ==
- Agramonte, Carlos: El General Timoteo Ogando y la familia más heroica de las guerras independentistas dominicanas, Santo Domingo, Editorial Argos, 2005
