= Gregorio Luperón =

28th President of the Dominican Republic (1879–1880)

General Restaurador Gregorio Luperón
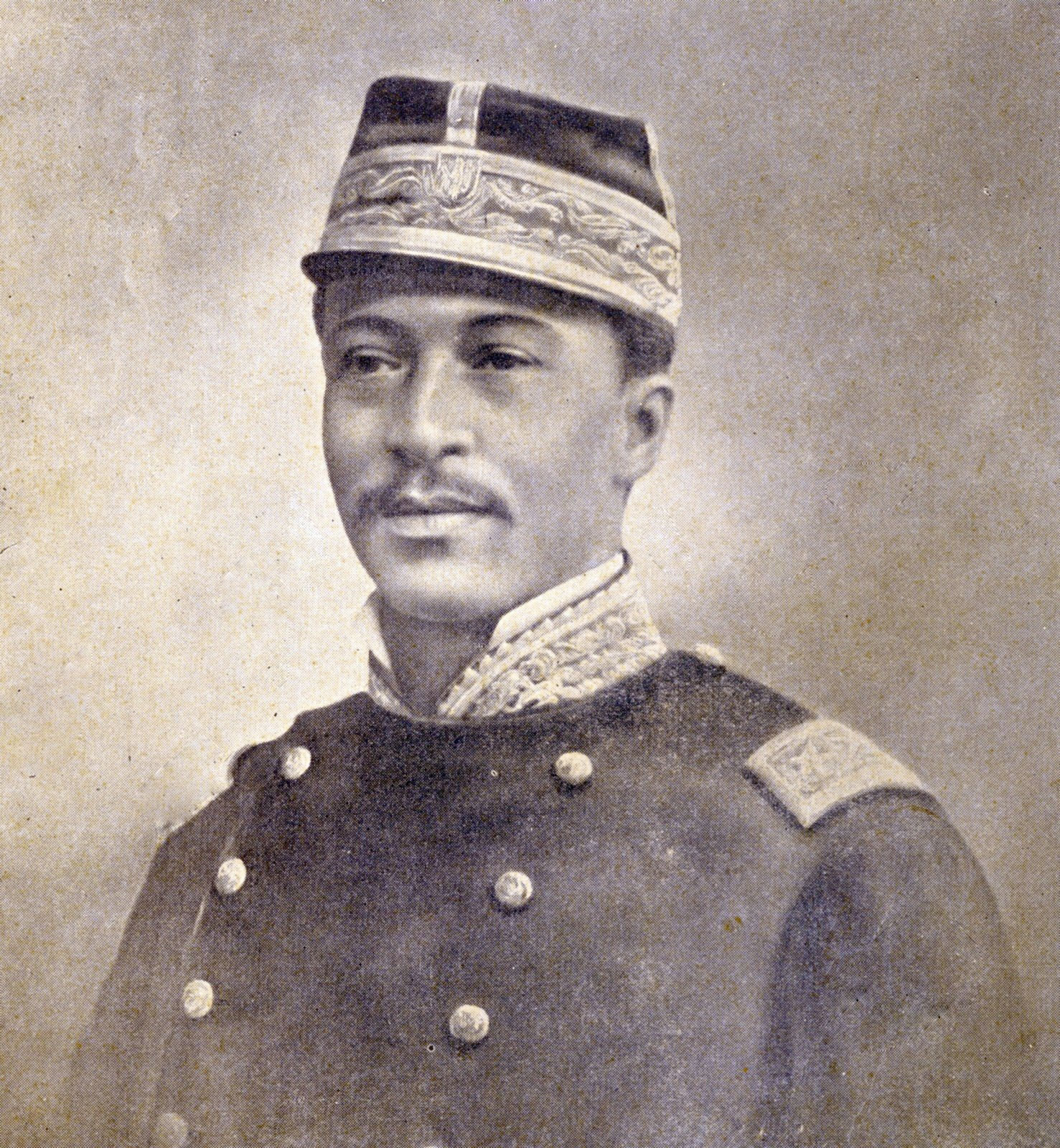
- Photograph of General Gregorio Luperón c. 1860s

28th President of the Dominican Republic
- In office October 7, 1879 – September 1, 1880
- Preceded by: Cesáreo Guillermo
- Succeeded by: Fernando Arturo de Meriño

Vice President of the Dominican Republic
- In office January 24, 1865 – March 24, 1865
- President: Benigno Filomeno de Rojas
- Preceded by: Ulises Francisco Espaillat
- Succeeded by: Benigno Filomeno de Rojas

Personal details
- Born: September 8, 1839 Port-de-Plate, Haiti
- Died: May 21, 1897 (aged 57) Puerto Plata, Dominican Republic
- Party: Blue Party
- Spouse: Ana Luisa Tavárez (m. 1865)
- Relations: José Gabriel Luperón (brother)
- Children: Luisa, Jacobo Leoncio, and Elena Maria Tavarez Bernal
- Parent(s): Nicolasa Luperón and Pedro Castellanos
- Profession: Military General

Military service
- Allegiance: Dominican Republic
- Branch/service: Dominican Army: Restoration Army; Blue Army
- Years of service: 1857–1897
- Rank: General
- Battles/wars: Cibaeño Revolution; Dominican Restoration War; Six Years' War

Gregorio Luperón (September 8, 1839 – May 21, 1897) was a Dominican revolutionary, military general, businessman, liberal politician, freemason, and statesman who was one of the leaders in the Dominican Restoration War.

Born in Puerto Plata in 1839, Luperón spent his early years as merchant, where he learned French to access a merchant's library. His revolutionary career began in 1857, during the Cibaeño Revolution against Buenaventura Báez. Luperón opposed the reincorporation of Santo Domingo into the Spanish kingdom and rose to prominence in the Dominican Restoration War. He became the commander-in-chief of the due to his strong patriotic sentiment and valor. Luperón was an active member of the Triunvirato of 1866, In the years after the Six Years' War, he assumed power in 1879 after the successful coup against Cesareo Guillermo, reorganizing the government according to liberal principles. During his government, he incentivised secularism in the Dominican Republic with the help of the General Captain of Puerto Rico and Eugenio María de Hostos. However, Luperón was exiled multiple times for opposing Ulises Heureaux's despotic government, leading to regret and disappointment. He later assumed the presidency of a provisional government in Puerto Plata, where peace, freedom, and progress prevailed.

Luperón is remembered for his famous last words. Because of his contributions, he is often considered the fourth founding father of the Dominican Republic.

== Early life ==
His family origin reveals the man who excels through his own efforts and transcends disadvantageous conditions. Born in Puerto Plata on September 8, 1839, he was not recognized by his father – Pedro Castellanos, from the urban middle class – so he received the surname of his mother, Nicolasa Duperron, of humble condition, descendant of a Frenchman established in Santiago de los Caballeros, at the beginning of the 18th century, and of manumitted slaves who received that surname. It was Luperón himself who made the decision to change the surname, which translated a symbolic desire for self-affirmation. He was of mulatto ancestry; his mother was a black immigrant from the Lesser Antilles (possibly Martinique), and his father was a Dominican of Spanish descent. (The Cohabitation outside the bond of marriage between white men and black women constituted one of the keys to the process of miscegenation, in turn particular component of the formation of the conglomerate Dominican). As was common, he grew up in his mother's home environment, and his childhood was that of a poor child who had to work to help support the family. Himself, in the first pages of Autobiographical Notes and Historical Notes, he remembers having carried out jobs as a water bearer, baker, fisherman and seller of sweets and fruits. The above did not prevent him from being able to attend one of the few schools in Puerto Plata, run by an English subject, where he learned to read and write and received the rudiments that motivated him to improve himself culturally. Since 1844, when Luperón was around five years old, the atmosphere surrounding his environment was engulfed in revolutionary fervor, as his childhood took place in the midst of the Dominican War of Independence, a time in which the national identity was shaped through the struggle against invading forces.

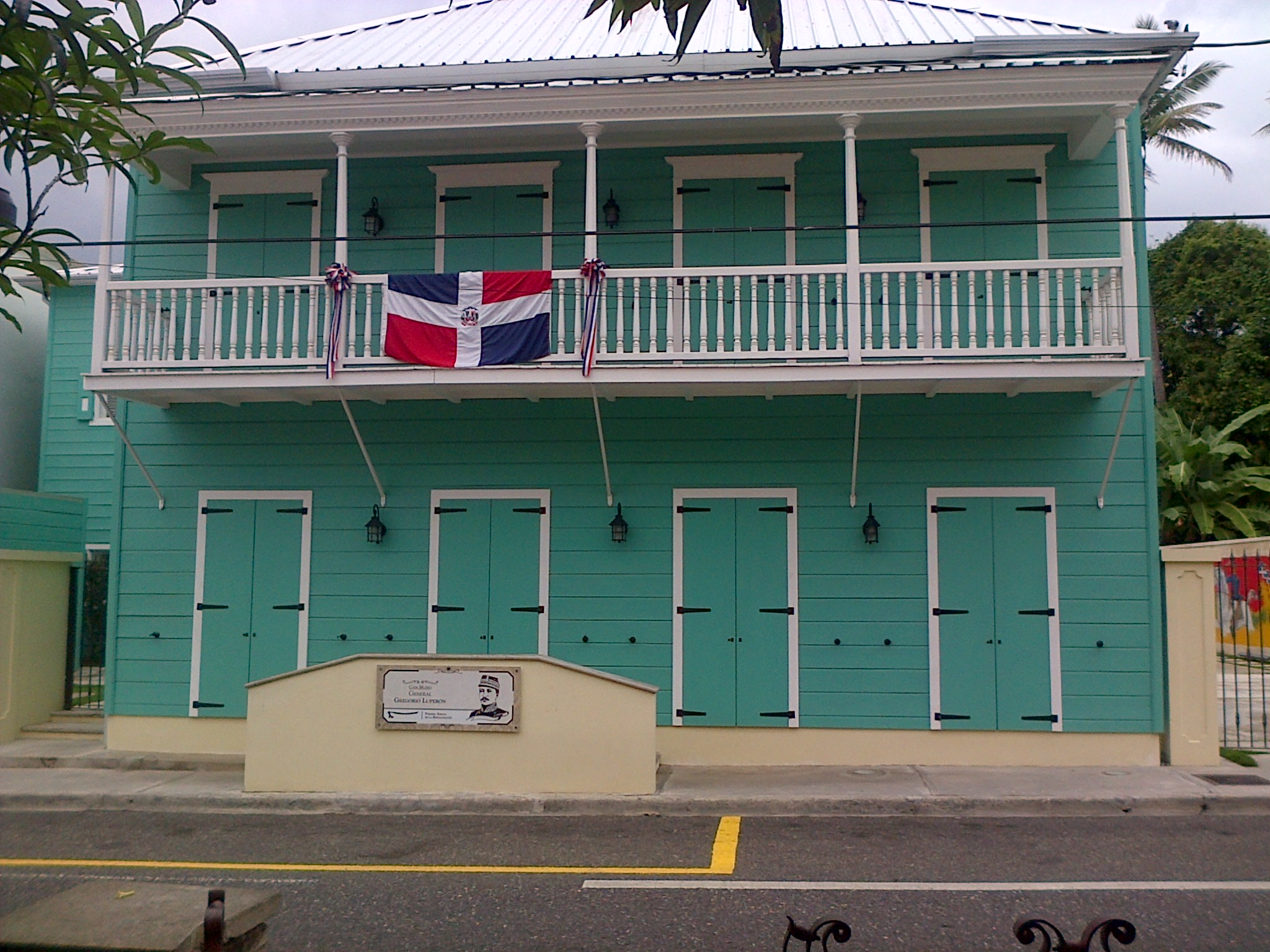
General Gregorio Luperón Museum, 12 de Julio Street, Puerto Plata

Due to the precocity resulting from his early incorporation to work, at the age of 14, he was appointed foreman of a mahogany cut by the Frenchman Pedro Dubocq, in Jamao, not far from Puerto Plata. It so happened that the owner was a cultured man, who had left books in the hut of the court, Vidas parallelales, by Plutarco, being the one that most influenced the formation of the young Goyito, as he was known to everyone. His personality ended up being defined in the wild life of Jamao, where he made a living for six years. Even as a teenager he had to face, machete in hand, to a group of scoundrels, which gained him celebrity and already revealed bravery as the first attribute of his personality. While working there, he displayed a strong strength of character and a knack for getting any job assigned to him completed in the best possible fashion. Because of this, Mr. Dubocq promoted Gregorio to a management position. Mr. Dubocq also allowed Gregorio to spend time in his personal library because Gregorio wanted to enrich his intellect. He was fluent in English, he had a gift for oratory, and in his employer's library he was able to begin solid self-taught training.

In 1857, when he was 18 years old, he joined the Cibaeño Revolution against the second government of Buenaventura Báez; he took part in the fighting in Samaná, the only place outside of Santo Domingo where the Baecistas managed to entrench themselves. From then on he became fixated on an insurmountable aversion to that character, who would form part of the plot of his political actions. In the midst of the conflict he received his first appointment; assistant commander at the Rincón post. It can be inferred that in 1857, Luperón was sufficiently educated to identify with the democratic proposals of the leaders of Santiago. His military vocation is also observed, as well as a recurring attitude: he did not last long in military and administrative functions, but decided to establish himself as a small merchant in Sabaneta de Yásica, the town closest to Jamao. Before the age of 20, he began the career that would lead him to be a wealthy bourgeois of Puerto Plata.

=== Masonry ===
He began his masonry studies in the Logia Nuevo Mundo No. 5, in the province of Santiago de los Caballeros where he would reach the highest 33rd Degree of Masonry.

On September 25, 1867, Luperón became a sectarian member of the Installation Commission of the reputable Masonic Restoration Lodge No. 11 in Puerto Plata, becoming a founder himself, becoming the Lodges first Orator. His guide and mentor was Venerable Master Don Pedro Eduardo Dubocq, who was a friend of Juan Pablo Duarte.

During Luperón's government in 1879, he widely incentivized Secularism with the help of a Spanish Captain General of Puerto Rico, Eugenio Maria de Hostos.

== Hero of the Dominican Restoration War ==
=== Beginnings of a revolution ===
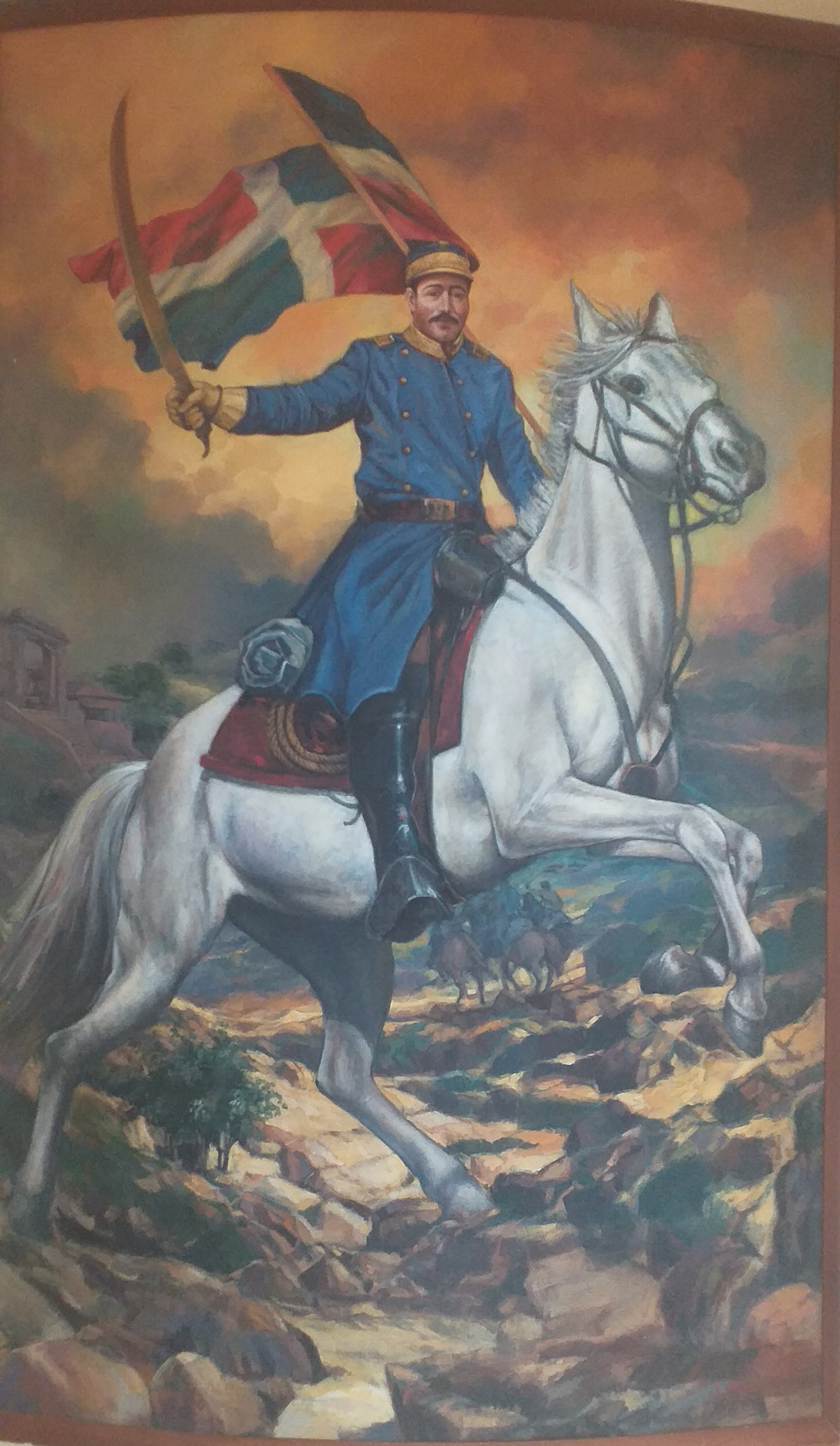
Painting of Luperón in the Dominican Restoration War found in El Monumento de Santiago

While its existence was going on without major disturbance in the midst of small-scale commercial operations in Sabaneta de Yásica, the annexation of the Dominican Republic to Spain took place on March 18, 1861. Not long after this, revolts against the implemented Spanish regime erupted. In June of that same year, Francisco del Rosario Sánchez, one of the three leaders responsible for the 1844 proclamation of the First Dominican Republic, led an armed uprising to challenge the Spaniards. Unfortunately, his rebellion was suppressed, and he, along with his companions, were shot on the orders of the occupying Spanish forces on July 4, 1861. The execution caused ripples throughout the nation, further intensifying the regime, which gave rise to more anti-Spanish plots.

Luperón, like a bolt of lightning, decided to register his absolute opposition to the political change. He made a bold call not to hand over weapons, as they would serve to regain freedom. The young rural shopkeeper, thanks to his readings in the inhospitable wood cutting, already had a good defined a personality that included a belligerent national conception. When he was presented with a copy of the manifesto supporting the annexation, he refused to sign it with high-sounding expressions. He was immediately subject to the persecution of General Juan Suero, the Black Cid, chief from Puerto Plata and until then his personal friend. Serum there was evaluated well, so he harassed him until he was forced to leave the country.

Suero told the then governor, Pedro Santana, the that he had to kill Luperón, since he anticipated that, if he did not do so, he would be his victim in combat. This forced Luperón to flee into exile and wander through the United States, Mexico and Jamaica. In this last country he met a homeopathic doctor, who died on a sea voyage. Luperón took his name, inherited his instruments and posed as a doctor, which gave him the necessary coverage to return to the country. Taking on the name Eugenio, he settled in Sabaneta, a town near the northern border, where he cultivated the friendship of the commander of weapons, Santiago Rodríguez Masagó. In that remote town – he records in Autobiographical Notes and Historical Notes – there were no revolutionary concerns. Patiently, Luperón added people to a propaganda action with the purpose of unleashing armed insurrection. When the extortion measures of the Spanish regime began to generate discontent among important sectors of the population of Cibao, Luperón agreed with other conspirators of the Northwest Line to start the rebellion. Lucas de Peña was appointed chief and a council composed of Norberto Torres, Ignacio Reyes and Gregorio Luperón was formed. They, as leaders, decided to appoint themselves generals.

As a result of Norberto Torres' precipitation, military operations began on February 21. Quickly, the conspirators formed contingents that proposed to expel the Spanish troops. of the Northwest Line. The population of Sabaneta spoke out against Spanish rule and remained the main center of the uprising. Luperón was sent to extend operations in the direction of San José de las Matas, but he ran into resistance from the “serranos,” a term used to designate the inhabitants of the foothills of the Central Mountain Range. This attitude showed that, in February 1863, a considerable portion of the population still had neutral or favorable attitudes regarding the annexation, which led to the rapid failure of the insurrectional attempt in Santiago. Reserve troops remained loyal to the Crown throughout Cibao. As the days passed, the government took the initiative and routed the rebels.

Some took refuge in Haiti, others hid and the majority chose to appear and take advantage of the guarantees offered by the rulers. Some of those presented were shot, which inaugurated the reign of terror established by General Manuel Buceta and Colonel Campillo, the two Spanish military leaders in the region. Luperón did not care about the population's attitude towards the rebels, since the only thing that counted was his attachment to the principles of good causes, even at the risk of being left alone, as was the constant norm for the rest of his life. Still young, he strengthened the will to rigorously observe the principles, with absolute independence from the prevailing circumstances. Hence he decided not to surrender or leave the country.

For him, the annexation entailed a state of legal and social inferiority for the Dominicans and contravened the right to sovereignty. He followed closely to the ideals left behind by La Trinitaria. Independence, he believed, was the only system that could guarantee the dignity and happiness of the people. Their duty could not be other than to continue working with all determination to restart the struggle, until freedom was achieved. He was convinced that if the majority of people thought otherwise, it was due to ignorance or the influence of shady interests, which is why he was obliged to oppose such a point of view. Sentenced to death in default, he had to abandon the area and take refuge in La Jagua, a rural section near La Vega. He again established contact with patriots, waiting for the conditions for rebellion to ripen again.

=== Raids from Haiti ===
The northern border area remained the weakest territorial link in Spanish domination. The exiles in Haiti, commanded by Santiago Rodríguez and Benito Monción, made frequent raids in the surroundings of Dajabón. José Cabrera, another of the commanders of the February insurrection, managed to maintain a guerrilla force in Dominican territory almost the entire time. This explains why, in mid-August 1863, a contingent of exiles entered the country and, immediately, several pockets of rebellion spread. After a few days the “mambises” troops were at the gates of Santiago, after devastating the Spanish garrisons throughout the region.

Luperón was absent from what was happening on the Northwest Line, But as soon as he heard news, he prepared to join. When the rebels appeared in front of Santiago, they sent small contingents to the neighboring regions, so the insurrection spread to Moca, La Vega and other towns. It was Luperón's turn to take initiatives in these uprisings, asserting his status as general. As soon was possible, he joined the leadership of the operations against Santiago and joined the council of chiefs composed of generals Gaspar Polanco, Ignacio Reyes, Gregorio de Lora, and the colonels Pedro Antonio Pimentel, Benito Monción and José Antonio Salcedo. This council appointed Polanco as commander in chief, based on his seniority in the army of the defunct Republic.

Under the command of Polanco, Luperón took part in the events that led to the taking of Santiago, the siege of the Spanish and Dominican annexationists in the San Luis fortress and in their retreat towards Puerto Plata. The climax of these operations was the battle of September 6. From his position in El Meadero, Luperón directed a contingent that harassed the Spanish around the fort. Later, he commanded troops that tried to storm San Luis, always placing himself in the front row. He showed so many displays of bravery that he earned the admiration of the troops. In a certain way, in his opinion, he rivaled General Polanco, because both faced each other in the February rebellion, when the now general-in-chief still remained loyal to the Spanish regime. The battle was not easy, despite the courage of the Mambises, since the Spanish maintained a no less tough disposition for combat. At times the outcome of the crash was in doubt. In a moment of confusion, Luperón had a false communication read, written by himself, with falsified information that the southern and eastern provinces had revolted. Morale was immediately restored and the patriots regained the initiative. Audacity in difficult situations was another attribute of his warrior bearing.

In those days he showed an intransigent attitude towards the approaches aimed at negotiating with the Spanish. He strongly demanded that only the unconditional capitulation of those besieged in San Luis be accepted. When José Antonio Salcedo accepted the withdrawal of the Spanish towards Puerto Plata, Luperón arranged for his at his own expense to restart hostilities, which opened the chase to Puerto Plata. This intransigence derived from his conceptions. It is believed that the goal of restoring the Republic left no room for any mediatization. Hence, he also rejected Salcedo's suggestion to call Buenaventura Báez. For Luperón, Báez was as much an annexationist as Santana, so from that moment on he came into conflict with the surreptitious Baecista sector of the restoration field.

Immediately, José Antonio Salcedo took a dislike to him and decided to get rid of him, possibly judging him a dangerous rival. On the occasion of the appointment of the Provisional Government, a next reason for confrontation with Salcedo. He, who had remained with Luperón in Santiago, decided to summon notable civilians in order for them to elect a president and his cabinet. According to Luperón's account, Ulises Francisco Espaillat noted that all the generals had to be present. When Luperón arrived, he was informed of this point of view, at which he said that he was glad, since he had intended to arrest them all for usurpation of powers. Given the assurance offered by Salcedo that Polanco had given his acquiescence, Luperón agreed for the meeting to continue. When the time came for the president's election – always according to his story – he was proposed for the Presidency, which he declined and allowed Salcedo to remain in that position. Salcedo's election generated disagreement in Polanco, who considered that a natural procedure by not being consulted as general in chief. Luperón tried to stay away from such conflicts, since he was not interested in occupying positions other than those of troop leader. In his opinion, he reduced his actions to that of a temporary soldier, as long as the cause of freedom required his services.

=== End of the war ===
In accordance with this vocation of service, he accepted the designation of governor of La Vega. During the days he lasted in this position, his conciliatory considerations regarding his enemies were evident. At the time he was seen as the representative of the most radical position, which was not accurate, since his intransigence was limited to the demand for independence. He affirmed the criterion that the fight was not against the Spanish, whom, he assured retrospectively, he saw as brothers who had a place within the country, but against the oppressive regime of the annexation. Within this situation, he sought to protect the Dominicans who had fled from the exactions of some rebel leaders shown support for the annexation. He praised these urban notables as misguided Dominicans who had to be led out of their error. Despite being in antagonistic positions, Luperón appreciated them for seeing in them cultured people capable of being bearers of progress. On the contrary, in La Vega he used strong procedures to force them to commit to the restoration cause, and decided to set an intimidating example by shooting, on charges of espionage, a Spanish colonel who had left Santo Domingo with the aim of extracting money from the people. and obtain information.

When it became known about Santana's preparations to invade the Cibao, Luperón received the order from the Santiago government to take charge of operations in the southern and eastern provinces in order to stop Santana's column. He accepted the assignment – which put him in charge of the most critical scenario – with the condition that a decree be issued that would put Santana outside the law for treason and order his execution. Prior to his departure, he dispatched advances in all directions. Arriving on the other side of El Sillón de la Viuda, a mountain that separated the departments of Santo Domingo and La Vega, Luperón engaged in combat with the annexationist troops commanded by Santana. Faced with the Dominican flag, the disgraced general saw his aura of invinciblility disappear. After being defeated in the Battle of Arroyo Bermejo by the mambises commanded by Luperón, the old tyrant, as on previous occasions, opted to retreat. This time it did not do him much good, as he left the ground free for the guerrillas led by General Eusebio Manzueta to begin infiltrating towards the east.

Luperon was on several of the fronts at the precise moments when the course of events was being debated. After the battle of Santiago, his main military work took place in the leadership of operations in the south and east, where he showed a skill in command that placed his contribution among the most valuable in the entire course of the war. His courage in leading the troops and his nationalist belligerence earned him the high esteem of the soldiers, who came to ignore government orders, such as the one issued by President Salcedo that relieved him of the leadership of the Eastern Front. Luperón's military action was disturbed by Salcedo, who, moved by jealousy, he twice ordered his replacement. On the first occasion the President took command of the front on Monte Plata, and made costly military mistakes. Almost immediately, Luperón was assigned to reinforce operations on Baní and San Cristóbal, where he contributed to the expulsion of the annexationists. There he once again showed a conciliatory stance towards those who had shown solidarity with the annexation, opposing the predatory actions of General Juan de Jesus Salcedo.

During operations in the vicinity of Santo Domingo, he was summoned by General Pedro Florentino, appointed chief in San Juan, who announced that he had received an order from the government to shoot him. Florentino, despite his toughness, did not want to shoulder the responsibility, so he sent Luperón to Cibao. Upon arriving in Santiago and after interviewing members of the government, it became clear that the order against him came from Salcedo. While the problem was resolved, he was confined in Sabaneta, where he was again summoned to rejoin actions in the east. In the second opportunity to intervene in the operations, Luperón contributed to expanding the rebellion to all corners of a region where Santana still enjoyed popularity. He returned to Santiago due to his poor health, undermined by months of stay in cantons where they barely ate, despite being accustomed to the harsh existence in the mountains.

From then on he took part in the events that occurred at the highest levels of the government. He assured that he did not renounce his position as a combatant without aspiring to charges, but the urgencies of an impetuous process forced him to get involved in political resolutions and accept positions since the end of 1864. He refused to participate in the movement that overthrew Salcedo, but once the fact was consummated, he unreservedly supported the Polanco government, since he believed that the war would recover the vigor lost in the previous months. He considered, a posteriori, the Polanco government as the culmination of the national-democratic project of the restoration feat. More than anyone, Luperón condemned the attempts of the deposed president Salcedo in favor of Báez or an armistice with the Spanish; However, in strict observance of principles, he was the only general who protested publicly for his execution and tried to protect him as much as possible.

When Polanco fell, Luperón was proposed for the presidency by a council of generals meeting in Santiago, which he again declined. However, in order not to break the cohesion of the restoration field, he was forced to participate in the provisional government presided over by Benigno Filomeno de Rojas, in which he held the vice presidency and the acting presidency due to the illness of the incumbent and his fear of facing the demands of the generals. It seems that, in those circumstances, when rivalries and ambitions began to manifest themselves, he tried to survive within a delicate balance, conscious of their weakness and their responsibility to help ensure that the objectives involved were not distorted. At the same time, he tried to maintain his independence, which is why he refused to accept any more positions, when Pimentel was president.

== Second Dominican Republic ==
=== Opposition to Báez ===
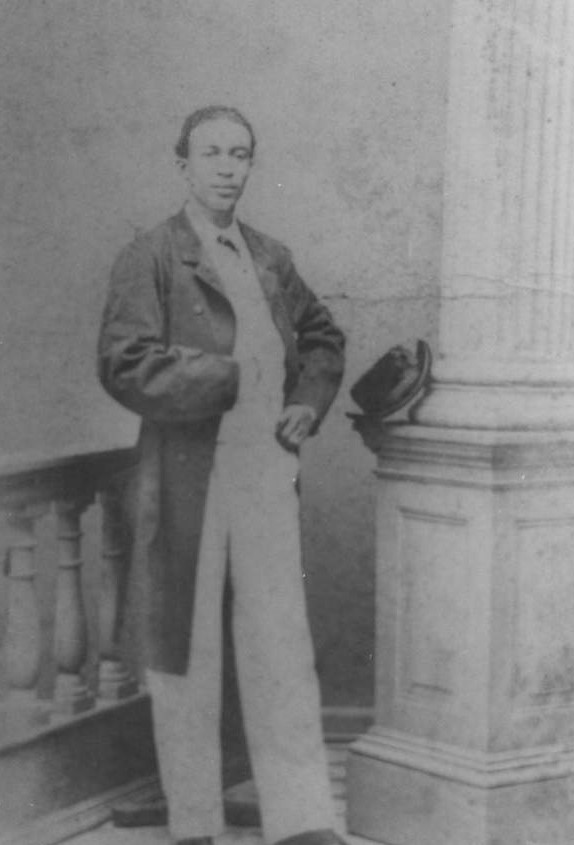
General Luperon in 1866

Once the war was over, in July 1865, the only thing Luperón proposed was to establish a commercial house on the ruins of Puerto Plata. Thinking that the future of the country was clear, it seems that for a brief time he came to the conclusion that his political commitment had ended. He says that his conviction about the terrible nature of political activity was strengthened, so the contribution to development of the country would do it from the position of bourgeois. Such inclination could not be maintained for long, because in October 1865, barely three months after the evacuation of the Spanish troops, the restoring general Pedro Guillermo led a mutiny in Hato Mayor in favor of Báez. What Luperón feared most was the return of Báez, who posed danger to the nation.

Unfortunately, almost no one shared his point of view, since the fields between the parties were not yet drawn and it was not visible no obstacle for the man who had held the position of field marshal of the Spanish army during the war to return to the presidency. The vast majority of the military leaders of the Restoration bowed to the rising star of the veteran annexationist. President José María Cabral, a follower of Báez in 1857, bowed to the facts and went to look for his former boss in Curaçao to offer him the presidency.

In his attempt at armed opposition to Báez, at the end of 1865, Luperón only had, among the leaders of the Restoration, the support of Benito Monción and Gaspar Polanco, but both quickly decided abandon the rebellion, which precipitated its failure. From exile, Luperón continued to promote movements against the government and finally reached an agreement with Manuel Rodríguez Objío, who had accepted the position of government delegate in Puerto Plata. This promoted the uprising of the city, which allowed it to receive Luperón as a hero. Immediately both began the actions that led to the overthrow of the government. In the south, former President Cabral, after resigning his position as Secretary of War, begins operations against Baez. The former field marshal had to leave power, albeit for a short time.

Luperón realized that he had to intervene to normalize the political situation, in order to resolve the conflicting aspirations of Cabral and Pimentel, then the two most powerful men to come out of the Restoration. To this end, he was part for the second time of a provisional government, the Triumvirate, together with Federico de Jesús García and Pedro Pimentel, which had the mission of organizing elections. Despite the contempt that Cabral deserved, Luperón had no choice but to recognize his popularity when he won the electoral tournament.

Once the intervention in the reorganization of the government was concluded, he returned to dealing with commercial activities in Puerto Plata, although he reacted to the recovery of Báez's popularity by agreeing to collaborate with the government in Cibao. He became involved again in political activity motivated by the consideration that national independence was would be in danger if Báez returned to the presidency. However, he could not achieve a cohesion of purposes with other important leaders who came out of the Restoration. Unlike Baecism, compacted Around loyalty to the supreme leader, the liberals were divided between several military leaders, each of whom had a cohort of followers. Of the three leaders, at that time Luperón was the who had less influence, but compensated for this weakness with his will and the superior coherence of his approaches.

As was to be feared, the inconsistencies of the Cabral government soon led to Báez's supporters rebelling again, especially in Cibao, where they had the majority support of the peasants. The Puerto Plata bourgeois warrior led the position of the urban middle-class sectors in favor of the Cabral government, and faced what he himself called a rural insurrection. It became clear that his infidelity was essentially limited to media in his hometown, largely thanks to primary relationships. Fighting Baecism in arms, he received information that the Cabral government was in negotiations with the United States to lease the Samaná peninsula in exchange for resources, in weapons and cash, that would guarantee survival. He decided to leave the country and protest, sending a letter to President Cabral in which he announced his willingness to fight it.

=== Annexation proposal, preparation for uprising, and Six Years' War ===
At the beginning of 1868, Cabral's second government had fallen, and with Báez again in the presidency, all the leading men of the Blue Party had to leave the country. Relations between bosses were characterized by mistrust. Luperón considered that Cabral lacked the conditions to lead the opposition, having shown signs of betraying the principles, so that he appointed himself supreme chief of the national armies, which Cabral and Pimentel also did. Each of these leaders operated on their own, although some intellectuals, such as José Gabriel García, sought to harmonize the competing interests. It had to be the Haitian president Nissage Saget who managed to put the agreement to the three leaders through a manifesto dated in Saint Marc on April 17, 1869, also signed by the main military leaders and liberal politicians who were preparing to invade the country. This agreement was feasible in response to the government's efforts to alienate Samaná and then annex the country to the United States. In addition to the intermediation of the Haitian president, the desire for unity increased among the blue expels, aware that the rivalries in their area fed back into the enemy's strength.

While Cabral entered the southern border, where he was received by General Timoteo Ogando – who was already waging a formidable guerrilla opposition to Báez – Luperón headed to Saint Thomas to gather resources among merchants who had business in Dominican Republic and feared losing the market if annexation to the United States materialized. To this end, with the money lent by these merchants, Luperón acquired the steamship El Telégrafo, which he armed and named Restauración. He was accompanied by some of his most faithful followers and other prominent blue politicians, such as generals Marcos Evangelista Adón, Severo Gómez (former bricklayer of his house), Segundo Imbert, Juan Belisario Curiel, Pedro Casimiro and Pablo Pujol.

The ship's occupants tried unsuccessfully to take Puerto Plata, after which they headed to Samaná in order to establish a government in arms. They had to battle for a month against its inhabitants, favorable to the government. The fate of El Telégrafo confirmed that Báez continued to enjoy a majority support in Cibao and that the blues had so few followers that they did not try to mobilize. Before abandoning the ship in a British possession, Luperón considered it advisable to go to the south, where Cabral had already consolidated the guerrilla detachments. Both blue leaders held a conference in Barahona, which was not successful in advancing the coordination of activities, but rather in deepening their differences. Cabral refused to consider Luperón's plan to advance on Santo Domingo, arguing that it lacked the effective to achieve it. The Telégrafo was declared a pirate ship by the Báez government, who described Luperón as a bandit. The United States government, determined to seize Dominican territory since the end of 1869, took advantage of this circumstance, so the patriots had to fight combat with a ship from that country. After the expedition, Luperón sent a vibrant letter to US President Ulysses S. Grant that positioned him, beyond his status as a hero, as a precursor of opposition to American expansionism. In that letter he writes,

Today I repeat our protest again, no longer hesitant because of doubt, but horrified by the consummation of a violent act and convinced that a bad law handling wants to decide the fate of my country.

General Sickies represented American interests in Madrid, and there he displayed conduct that earned him the applause of his country. Thus, I and my numerous fellow expatriates also represent the interest of the Dominican Republic, and we must speak to you in the language of frankness.

Spain, despite its traditional quixotism, rejected the unworthy request of the diminished Báez and, in our opinion, the conduct of the Spanish government was more honest than yours.

The American government has made progress in an unjust combination, it has allied itself with the traitor Báez to persecute good citizens and annihilate Dominican independence.

His Excellency had the weakness of ordering, of authorizing the destruction of the Telegraph, giving rise to the immoral decree of the mercenary Senate of Báez.

Mr. President Grant: If we both appealed to an impartial judgment of cultured nations and asked who was the real pirate, between General Luperón, who rode the steamer Telegrafo, trying to save the territorial integrity of the land where he was born, or President Grant, who sent his streamers to seek shelter in Samaná, without prior authorization from the American Congress, the solution would not be, in my opinion, very difficult.

Mr. President, Your Excellency has abused force to protect the lowest corruption. And if it is true that it is humiliating for the Dominican people to have such traitorous leaders, it is no less unseemly for the great American people that their government consent to such ruinous reductions.

For both nations the fact is shameful!!

In this degrading task, traitors lose time, work and honor; sooner or later the facts are reestablished. Scams of this kind have no future, a Nation, no matter how small, cannot be erased, like a footprint stamped on sand. The American Government notified the French in 1866 that their stay in Mexico was a threat to America; The Dominican people thought the same, and our Congress awarded the undefeated Juárez the title of Benemérito de América. Now, won't the usurpations of your Government be a threat to America? Ignorance and betrayal are the causes originating from all our evils; There are peoples who retreat incessantly, using experience to increase their misfortunes, to continually worsen.

We Dominicans are indebted to Santana and Báez for this condition: Why does he want to take advantage of it? That is unworthy of the people who should be the protector of our progress. The repeated doctrine of Monroe has its vices and its delusions. We believe that America should belong to itself, and away from any European influence, living like the old world, with its own, local and independent wine; but we do not think that America should be Yankee.

From one fact to another there is a great distance that cannot be bridged. We know the answer Washington gave to the English when they asked him for a port on the northern coast to establish a stopover: "Every inch of American territory cost the people a drop of blood." "The Dominican Republic is a very small piece of land, which has brought great calamities to the nations that have tried to usurp it."

The failure of El Telégrafo did not deter Luperón, who some time later entered the country across the border, leading just 45 men. He had the support of some generals in the area that did not materialize, which determined the failure of the company.

=== Post-Six Years' War ===
As is known, the Six Years government fell as a result of the discontent of his own followers, and not because of the armed action of the blues. On November 25, 1873, generals Ignacio María González and Manuel Altagracia Cáceres, the main Baecista leaders of Cibao, revolted. González remained in the presidency, from which he formed a third political trend, which became known by the color green, with which he expressed the will to overcome the terrible difference between reds and blues. Now, although at the beginning they enjoyed the sympathy of a part of the blues, the greens were no more than a detachment from the reds, so they renewed their caudillo behavior. Quite quickly an insurmountable conflict arose between Luperón and President González. Luperón's influence within the country remained limited, limited above all to Puerto Plata, with the exception of a small number of intellectuals and liberal politicians who appreciated him as the exponent of principles in the field of war.

After Báez's fall, for several months González was successful in keeping Luperón out of the country, as well as Cabral and Pimentel. González gained popularity due to the wear and tear of Báez and for inaugurating a period that overcame the deadly polarization between the flags. But, by attempting to completely displace the blues, he came into conflict with Luperón. Although he initially reiterated his desire to distance himself from politics, in fact he remained the sole leader of the blues, condition that was defined exclusively in the field of war, since Cabral did make his withdrawal effective and Pimentel died in Haiti due to complications due to the wound received in one of the raids by border.

The conflict broke out due to Luperón's demand that recognized as national debt the sum of 170,000 pesos that he had borrowed mainly from merchants in Saint Thomas to finance the acquisition of El Telégrafo and the corresponding weapons. At the beginning, González declared that he agreed to recognize that commitment, but in the end he made it clear that he did not agree, under the premise that it would strengthen Luperón. According to this, González inaugurated a new style of bribery to the generals, which is why he probably calculated that he would require the resources in question to consolidate his power. In Puerto Plata, incidents occurred that pitted the local authorities with Luperón, who had to repel an attack, barricaded in his house with a few friends. He managed to maintain himself thanks to the support he obtained from the sectors that saw him as a champion of the country and a respectable citizen dedicated to his commercial activities.

The dispute between Luperón and González led the latter to extreme authoritarian procedures, to the point that a group of prestigious citizens of Santiago opened a formal accusation against the mandatary. The leading voice of this movement, which came to take the name of La Evolución, was assumed by Manuel de Jesús de Peña y Reynoso. Luperón took charge of the government's ignorance operations and had his close friend, Alfredo Deetjen, appointed as provisional president based in Santiago. González had to give up starting a civil war; elections were called and Ulises Francisco Espaillat, who represented the feelings of the blues, was elected, although he was determined to overcome the competition between the parties.

At that moment the correlation of forces can be summarized as follows: the most influential urban sectors of Cibao were already clearly aligned behind Luperón and the blues. But, on the contrary, the rural mass of the people remained obedient to the dictates of the leaders, most of whom were hostile to the blues and to Luperón in particular; Additionally, the bulk of the leading sectors of the southern band still saw the blues as exponents of a Cibaeño regionalist interest, which is why they maintained support for the old caudillo leaders. The new president obtained a favorable consensus, but was forced to count on recognized liberals in the first place, while his willingness to eliminate the compensation that González granted to the military leaders caused them to take animosity toward him.

Luperon agreed to be part of Espaillat's cabinet, as Secretary of War, which also contributed to detonating the hostility of the leaders. When they rebelled in Cibao, Luperón considered that his position in defense of the government was in Puerto Plata. He came into conflict with other members of the cabinet because he considered that there was a wrong conduct of government policy and of the military operations. One of the reasons for the disagreement lay in his defense of the interests of the Compueblan merchants who had granted loans to the government and, before, to the blue side, arguing that their support was indispensable and that the Mariano Cestero's financial reform condemned them to ruin.

=== Espaillat's fall from power, return of Báez ===
Espaillat's government fell at the end of 1876, and shortly afterward Báez returned for the last time. On that occasion Luperón did not want to speak out against his archenemy, perhaps for fear of being described as a wayward revolutionary, since, eager for peace to reign, quite a few blue intellectuals provided support to the red leader, who pretended in words to adhere to democratic principles. Báez fell due to the coalition of various forces, he temporarily shone Cesáreo Guillermo, who led the insurrection in the east of the country. In this situation, Luperón was aware that he lacked the necessary support to seize power and sustain it, so he maintained a discreet stance, a calculation that he justified with the perennial argument of his lack of interest in occupying the presidency. Actually, in those circumstances he operated like another leader, aware of the animosity that almost all the other leaders professed towards him, adhering to particular interests although with the advantage of representing a rational option that promised to guarantee order and principles that no one dared expressly refute. He only had to wait for his rivals to wear out, so he negotiated advantageous positions in his stronghold of Puerto Plata and left his subordinates free to collaborate with Guillermo's government. But, upon returning from his second trip to Europe, he found that the President was violating his promises and was moving towards establishing a tyranny, a consideration which included the intention of achieving control over the Puerto Plata customs office, the most important in the country. a measure that would have left Luperón lacking power resources.

=== Provisional President: 1879–1880 ===
Leading his most faithful followers in Puerto Plata, Luperón launched a manifesto, on October 6, 1879, in which he disowned Guillermo's government due to its tyrannical pretensions. Aware of his rival's weakness, he did not even bother to lead the forces dispatched to Santo Domingo, which remained under the command of Ulises Heureaux, who in previous years had emerged as his most capable lieutenant, especially in military actions. This triumph was ratified naturally, an expression of the erosion of the options of opposing power, through the support of influential figures from all cities – some not exactly characterized by the relationship with the Blue Party, such as Eugenio de Marchena in Azua and Benito Monción in Monte Cristi.

When announcing the overthrow of Guillermo, for the first time Luperón agreed to occupy the provisional presidency, aware that it was required of his personal intervention to redirect the country's affairs and contribute to opening the path of progress. He surely also calculated that the attrition of his adversaries would clear the way for an era of peace, in which it would be possible to apply the national-liberal project. His time as president, however, reveals that he was not willing to assume all the consequences of power. On the one hand, he did not agree to abandon Puerto Plata, both out of attachment to the land and for not sacrificing the commercial operations in which he was involved. As far as can be gathered, he saw power as a circumstantial fact and granted it the least possible meaning. Such consideration created a terrain of weakness to the future of the project it supported. Additionally, his presidency represented the culmination of the economic preeminence of Cibao, for decades in struggle against the centralism of Santo Domingo. This occurred just when tobacco, the sustenance of the Cibaeño's economy was entering a pronounced crisis. In these critical conditions, the clinging to Puerto Plata betrayed indifference towards the personal power. He delegated the daily affairs of power to his lieutenant Ulises Heureaux, delegate in Santo Domingo and secretary of War. Thus, a precedent of dual power was created, although during the provisional government of Puerto Plata it did not generate friction of any kind. Luperón was convinced that the country was entering an irreversible era of progress and that his only responsibility for it not there were setbacks was in choosing the ideal candidate for the presidency, both in moral and intellectual conditions.

Some historians have argued that Luperón's clinging to his residence in Puerto Plata was motivated by the discretionary use he made of the customs resources collected in the city, then the most important in the country. Although, certainly, the hero carried out personal dealings with customs resources, the criterion is based on excessive simplification. At no time, in truth, did the love of business prevail over the desire for glory. On the other hand, from that same time onwards the size of the operations and the amount of Luperón's fortune were exaggerated. The origin of this did not come from illegal uses of power or any other form of corruption, but from his individual capacity for business, although favored by the authority that emanated from his name. He never admitted incompatibility between political functions, which he did not wish to exercise, and commercial or productive operations, which he considered the foundation of the citizen's existence. In line with the above, although he maintained his refusal to exercise personal power, he proposed to exercise stewardship in the essential and long-term state guidelines. He did not intend to manage the presidents, but rather to establish a frame of reference for them about what they should do. The proof is that, as soon as he concluded his interim term as president and handed over the position to the priest Fernando Arturo de Meriño, he returned to Europe, agreeing to serve as the country's plenipotentiary envoy.

During the presidency, although he left executive tasks in the hands of Heureaux, Luperón gave the government guidelines in line with his convictions. Among them, the importance given to education, with the Santo Domingo Normal School at the head of which Eugenio María de Hostos was appointed. The privilege of culture, within the difficult financial conditions that the country was going through, was expressed in the provision that each periodical publication received a subsidy of 40 pesos per month and each book 25% of the cost of its publication. But more than active measures, as president, he understood that it was necessary to guarantee a climate of freedoms and emphasize the security of property, as opposed to the disorder of the leaders. According to the precepts developed by the liberals of that time, it was enough that the political system functioned adequately so that the country headed down the path of progress. He emphasized respect for the judiciary as the basis of the rule of law.

In any case, the Provisional Government adopted tentative measures dents to economic regularization. In this sense, they proceeded to pay back salaries and try to ensure that all public servants were paid punctually their salaries. Understanding the functioning of the Credit Boards, the President ordered the cancellation of outstanding accounts with these entities and other lenders, while it solidified international debts by recognizing an interest of 2% monthly. In order to achieve an increase in tax revenues, he promoted a stamp law, which could not be applied due to the opposition of the Congress. Instead, a tariff variation was immediately approved: import taxes were reduced from an average of 55% to 35%, while in the name of an assumption of equity, the tax on sugar exports and sugar exports was doubled. coffee and cocoa with an additional 50%. It is notable that the only product not taxed was tobacco, although the government did not argue this.

As president, the hero had to face problems more delicate such as the requirement to strengthen the State and the safeguarding of freedoms, the demand for financial resources to apply public policies in a country exhausted by past wars of warlords. He experienced firsthand the conflict between the mentality of the majority of the population, which placed all its expectations on the action of the State, and its reluctance to pay taxes.

Another point that mortified was that of the military organization. Guided by the certainty that the country had the resources to maintain full independence from international powers, he understood that it was urgent to strengthen the state apparatus, first of all through a military force capable of confronting recent innovations in weapons. He was convinced that the country required a permanent armed force, both to keep the warlords at bay and to defend sovereignty. But he confirmed that the majority of the members of the force operated as outlaws dedicated to extorting the poor population. He was also aware that a strong army carried a serious danger to democracy and, in general, a strong State contradicted his faith in the individual sovereignty of the citizen. As such, as provisional president, he will dedicate efforts to the modernization of the army and the reorganization of the National Guard, proceeding to build barracks and import weapons and uniforms.

=== Presidency of Fernando Arturo de Meriño ===
When his political career was culminating, as the most powerful man in the country, Luperón released a set of musings that showed a worsening of the disenchantment that had plagued him for years. When presenting Fernando Arturo de Meriño's candidacy, he said goodbye to power with a hint of bitterness, stating: "the disappointments I have suffered in my long political career have sickened my spirit, and I feel incapable of supporting the overwhelming weight of the Supreme Judiciary of the State.” Although he did not abandon his faith in principles, he was invaded by doubts about the moral quality of Dominicans to be agents of freedom and progress. He even noted that many of his close colleagues lacked any valuable asset and only sought to prosper, regardless of the consequences. He was lefr in a bind, since figures of this appearance was part of the apparatus through which it exercised its hegemony. However, in the end he saw these problems as minor, convinced that progress would eliminate such miseries and that their moral authority would put a stop to any disordered desires. Beyond doubts, he was convinced that the only way was of democracy and the safeguarding of sovereignty, for which it was necessary to promote economic modernization.

For him it was incontrovertible that capitalism was identified with desirable modernity. His bourgeois convictions were consolidated, which became evident when he announced the abandonment of commercial activities to allocate his capital to the development of a sugar mill together with Puerto Plata partners. Likewise, during his government and in subsequent Blue Party governments, franchises were granted that implied advantages to capital investors. Luperón was convinced of the virtue of that strategy for achieving progress. But in it was the germ of an oligarchic order that generated early criticism among young intellectuals, whom he harshly reprimanded, calling them "visionaries" and "socialists," since they were presented as factors of discord at a time when, he claimed, there were no principles to discuss. Steeped in the French experience, where a few years before the workers had established the Paris Commune, Luperón went so far as to call socialism the worst of tyrannies.

The latter does not mean that he adopted a reactionary stance. Rather, it tried to harmonize the requirements of capitalist development with the conservation of precepts of social equity. He still believed a capitalist development project was feasible that guaranteed independence, democracy and the well-being of all. Hence his appreciation of the beneficial national order in contrast to that of the State is not surprising: “And although the Republic, as its founders made it, is despotic and oppressive, the nation, as Providence has made it, is socialist, to such an extent that fifty years of torture has not been enough to destroy social equality."

In those years his liberal position was consolidated. He aspired to the predominance of the private citizen, the epitome of the bourgeois and, therefore, agent of progress. He placed his guiding role in helping to anticipate the archetype desirable citizen of the future, a simile of the one found in developed countries. His travels confirmed the certainty that modern civilization constituted the inevitable destiny, given the evidence that the other schemes of society showed a balance of despotism and superstition.

Luperón did not hide his disdain for the popular culture of the Dominicans, precisely because in his opinion it constituted the burden that must be uprooted to achieve progress. This consideration made him participate in the panacea, shared by liberals and conservatives, of European immigration as a key to promoting progress. That same year, Luperón attended a banquet in France, where in Paris he was proclaimed Honorary President of the Salvadores de Sena and Salvadores de Francia Societies, apart from being also decorated with the Legion de Honor. In this position, he took steps to attract a flow of Russian Jews. His own evolution shows a tenacious purpose for personal improvement, in order to achieve the dignity of the white man, which he sincerely aspired for the common Dominicans to imitate. Such commitment explains the tenacity with which he corrected diction, gestures, table habits and writing style. Although it is true that he never achieved the systematicity of an intellectual and that he did not achieve an adequate command of the written language, he did reach the level of reflection typical of intellectuals, at least in the areas that touched public policies. In the environment of nineteenth-century political leaders, he stands out for his willingness to present his ideas in a formal manner. Báez was more cultured than him, and Heureaux was more intelligent, but neither left a literary work. The Autobiographical Notes and Historical Notes can be classified as one of the Dominican literary monuments, of an essential quality that no other politician has emulated to date.

The repeated comparison drawn by between the Dominican despots and Africa, seen as the quintessential kingdom of despotism and backwardness. In the same order, it is possible to place his diatribes to the Haitian community, suffering, according to him, from inherent evils; judgments that on other occasions he relativized, recognizing the virtue of Haitian nationalism, especially of some figures who deserved his appreciation, and he expressed the consideration that the two countries would benefit from an alliance to confront American expansionism. At the opposite extreme, France always shone in his eyes as the incarnation of progress, the place where he said he felt fulfilled, far from the pettiness of politics. Belatedly, to his surprise, he discovered that the French bourgeois republicans also suffered from defects comparable to those of the primitive Dominican politicians.

=== Disturbance of power balance and rise of Ulises Heureaux ===
When the Provisional Government of Puerto Plata was ending, Luperón wrote to Pedro Francisco Bonó proposing that he accept the nomination for the presidency. He was aware that Bonó was the most enlightened intellectual of the time, and the fact that he wanted to him to assume leadership indicates that he was penetrated in good faith and harbored no duplicity in his disinterest in matters of power. Bonó declined, not out of fear that the same thing would happen to him as happened to his friend Ulises Espaillat, as has been said, but because of divergences with the concept of development that was shared by the leading social sectors and the blue hierarchs. On two occasions Luperón again asked the isolated intellectual to reconsider his position, and on one of them Bonó frankly explained his repudiation of the concept of “progress” in vogue, since it entailed the proletarianization of the small peasantry, in his opinion the social basis of the country. What was at stake was a criticism of the oligarchic liberal scheme that was beginning to operate under the aegis of the blues, even above the good intentions of Luperón and a part of the intellectuals who supported his preeminence, infused with a democratic spirit. Bonó was ahead of his time, so it seems that his criticisms exceeded the intellectual capacity of Luperón, who in his response was content to ratify his vision of the tasks that awaited the country to complete an institutionalization process that would clear the obstacles to progress.

In a subsequent letter, Bonó expressed critical considerations about Heureaux, to which Luperón responded by ratifying the trust that his dolphin generated in him. Like many, Bonó perceived Heureaux as the bearer of the oligarchic style, despotic violence and administrative corruption. Luperón, on the other hand, considered him: “A skilled, active, courageous soldier, bold, prepared, tactical, disciplined, attentive, capable of executing any maneuver, clever and astute […]”, although he added: “Man, however, without any political principle, very skilled at evil and bankruptcy, and without any intelligence for good." Although Luperón held an incontestable preeminence since 1879, the intricacies of the exercise of power were resolved through his relationship with Heureaux, in whom he placed unrestricted trust, as seen in the preceding quote. At that point Luperón showed little ability to penetrate to know people, and not due to lack of intelligence, but due to unlimited confidence in himself and in the irreversible march of rationality. His trust in Heureaux was derived from his capacity for simulation, who constantly reiterated absolute submission, to the point of maintaining a filial relationship with the hero. At the same time, Luperón considered Heureaux's collaboration essential, considering that he had exceptional command conditions, necessary to maintain peace. At one point, he justified the preponderance he granted to Heureaux by claiming that he was the only one among his followers with the capacity to handle power problems and apply repressive measures to crush the leaders.

There, precisely, lay the detail: in the midst of the proclamations of establishing democracy, it was maintained thanks to the implacable arm of the dolphin. This did not only reveal the violent and daring man, willing to do anything to maintain the stability of the can; In addition, Heureaux's intelligence placed him as the key partner of the situation, deliberate bearer of the oligarchic style, with its antidemocratic and inequitable implications. While in Puerto Plata, since Luperón trusted in the harmonious evolution of things, Heureaux established close ties with the emerging commercial and sugar sectors of the south, with which he built his own platform.

=== Clashes with Heureaux ===
In 1880, Luperón still sought an intellectual, the priest Fernando Arturo de Meriño, for the presidency, but it became clear that the guarantee of the situation was found in Heureaux. This, from his position of Secretary of the Interior, crushed Braulio Álvarez's uprising near Santo Domingo and, months later, Cesáreo Guillermo's expedition through Higüey. The country was shocked by the executions ordered by Heureaux, in an action as ruthless as those that had valid repudiation of the reds, who considered themselves already surpassed. The one who was most insensitive to the wave of criticism of the government was Luperón, to the point that, the year after the massacre in Higüey, he proposed Heureaux for president.

Much of the public opinion, especially the cultured young people took a dislike towards Heureaux and extended it towards Luperón because they considered him a participant and accomplice in the former's executions. Retrospectively, Luperón, after having denounced Heureaux as a criminal, evaluated his first government favorably. On the contrary, others saw the germ of a new authoritarianism, led by a highly dangerous subject prone to the ruthless use of violence. Since 1883, there was no doubt for almost anyone that, with Luperón absent in Europe for long periods, the real factor of power was in the hands of the president. Furthermore, it was also obvious that a corrupt practice had been established. For the 1884 elections, the Dauphin began a deaf questioning of the hegemony of Luperón, who ended up supporting the candidacy of his friend Segundo Imbert, despite his manifest lack of conditions for the position. Heureaux took advantage of the position of Meriño, who, as former president and for regionalist reasons, felt with the force of promoting his friend Francisco Gregorio Billini.

Billini was a much better candidate than Imbert, but he was subject to Heureaux's manipulation. The dolphin reached the limit of using his condition of president to cause the electoral fraud of 15,000 votes that gave an illegal majority to Billini. Since he took over the presidency, he began to receive pressure from Heureaux, who even suggested to Luperón that he could depose him at any time. Billini tried to maintain personal independence, for which he suffered the intrigues of the dauphin. When, in response, Billini authorized the return to the country of the exiles, among them former President Guillermo, his personal friend, in order to weaken Heureaux, he promoted a situation of confrontation and disobedience. In this undertaking he obtained the support of Luperón, who provided the last straw and forced the honest blue fighter to resign.

From then on, Luperón's mistakes cascaded, a situation that reveals that he was not prepared to face the oligarchic degeneration of the project birthed by himself and promoted by the subject who had been deserving of his greatest trust. The Problems that involved the conversion of the majority of blue politicians into adherents to Heureaux's line disconcerted Luperón. Perhaps as a result of this situation, Luperón later set out to straighten his social base, despite the high cost it had for his prestige.

The most dramatic part of the conflict occurred when he became aware of his dolphin's intentions, upon verifying the fraud against Imbert and the siege operations against Billini. On the occasion of the elections of 1886, an inevitable dilemma occurred, given Heureaux's aspirations. to succeed Alejandro Woss y Gil, who held the interim presidency after Billini's resignation. On this occasion, Casimiro Nemesio de Moya – a young vegan politician – received support from almost the entire blue conglomerate in the Cibao area. Perhaps Luperón could still have stopped the definitive promotion of his former lieutenant, but far from doing so he supported him in the elections. Knowing that a new electoral fraud had occurred, aware that Moya enjoyed the support of the majority of the country, Luperón assured that Heureaux had won handily and accepted the position of government delegate in Cibao, in which he had to direct part of the military operations against Moya's supporters, who took up arms in protest against the fraud. Unfortunately, the young people with the most authentic democratic convictions were placed on the opposite side of the barricade, among them his brother-in-law Félix Tavárez, for whom he felt a burning affection, who had fallen in the fighting.

== Revolution of 1886 ==
As soon as the civil war ended, at the end of 1886, Luperón withdrew the support he had given to Heureaux, a sign that he was taking erratic steps. Later he chose to go to Europe, suffering from the start of serious health problems and perhaps with the hope of escaping an inevitable conflict. When he returned in 1887, he found a situation that he considered intolerable, since open persecution had begun against all those who opposed the indefinite preeminence of the new tyrant. Heureaux handled himself so skillfully that, to buy time, he encouraged Luperón to present his candidacy, giving him assurances that he would support him. It was the feline's calculation to entertain its victim. Soon, when Eugenio Generoso de Marchena returned from Europe with an advance on the first Westendorp loan, Heureaux understood that it would be feasible for him to bribe many followers of Luperón, and he reiterated what he had done two years before with those of Moya. Until recently, Luperón had considered it feasible to evict Heureaux of power by peaceful means, although he must have been skeptical about the assurances it gave him. He still, in theory, represented the unquestionable moral authority of the liberal conglomerate, but Heureaux had undermined it and was in full control of the armed force. For such reason, Meriño and other blue leaders, who in their conscience sympathized with Luperón, advised him to withdraw, given the evident willingness of the “official element” to remain in power at all costs. As expected, as soon as the Heureaux accepted his nomination, a campaign of intimidation ensued.

Luperón faced the saddest circumstances of his career. He found a society subject to a new tyrant who paid attention to ignoring patriotic values and traditions. Luperón weighed little compared to the government machinery built in recent years. At times, as he himself points out, he lost heart in the face of the bitter result of 30 years of struggles. Even when the confrontation between the master and his disciple began, the former had an entourage visible of followers who reiterated their trust in him. But many of them only agreed to get involved in the tasks of the electoral campaign on the condition that they were given salaries. Luperón had to work hard, spending more than 70,000 pesos in those months, which left him bankrupt. Some of his most trusted men were already Heureaux's confidants and, after the fact, he considered that they were staying with him to spy on him, as he claims that Federico Lithgow did, whom he later described as a model of the scoundrel. Imbert, another of his intimates, was already vice president of Heureaux and discreetly decided to betray Luperon's loyalty.

Apparently, the ideals of democracy had been shattered among the military caste of the blues, since almost all of its members joined the strong man's purposes. The intellectuals, for their part, with few exceptions, decided not to present opposition to Heureaux, to consider it as a kind of necessary evil, which would eventually bring peace and economic growth. Some of them – such as Manuel de Jesús Galván – provided support to Heureaux. Others agreed to collaborate sporadically and remotely, as was typical of Emiliano Tejera. Deep down they shared the essential contours of oligarchic modernization, an expression of the evolution to which liberalism prevailed. They were, furthermore, protected by the certainty that the country could not afford new revolutionary movements, making it necessary to submit to despotism.

Those who did not succeed in any way were the least, and almost all remained in a passive situation. They did not break personal ties with Luperón, whom they continued to respect, but political dealings with him ceased. Those who maintained a posture of resistance were forced to expatriate or suffered the rigors of prison. A few years after the modern dictatorship was established, a considerable part of the exiled opponents returned defeated to the country and some renewed their personal friendship with Heureaux, like Casimiro de Moya, or became his admirers, like the new sociologist José Ramón López. Those were counted remained faithful to the original ideals and to those who embodied them.

Luperón sensed that something profound had changed in the ethical area, so he became extremely disillusioned. He summarized this change in the esteem for money and the subsequent relegation of national ideals. He envisioned a dark future, although he could not connect it with the balance of oligarchic modernization, but limited it to the corrupting action of the tyrant:

Today the nation has lost principles and feelings, without which freedom disappears. Today the love of the country is a burden in the bottom of the pocket; Previously it was worn engraved on the heart. Very few currently think about the future, and it seems that they believe that the tyranny that humiliates and subjugates them will have no end, sustained by the perversion of the great popular feelings; and as if the country and patriotism were a chimera, they run after the oppressor to sell them their rights and freedoms, with which the stupid have the logical satisfaction of their baseness. Concupiscence supersedes any other consideration. Fraud in all businesses is the rule, rather than the exception. In politics they deceive each other, without any of them having the courage to protest against the infamy.

He felt there was no point in trying to oppose the nascent tyranny by force of arms. He surely perceived that the confrontation would cast a favorable balance on his enemy, who would exploit the event to present it as an anachronistic expression of the revolutionary spirit that had caused so much damage to the country and that threatened to prevent the material achievements of the current era of peace. As can be inferred from reading his letters, Luperón was trapped by the demand to maintain peace at all costs. For this reason, he resisted the pressure of the “young men” of Puerto Plata and other cities in the Cibao, who urged him to declare rebellion. Luperón realized that he could only safely count on the “young men,” but he did not share their radical conceptions, and even distrusted them due to their lack of political experience.

While his greatness was put at stake, he decided to persevere in the fight for the principles he had always upheld. As was customary, he would have to face exile and the miseries that it entailed. At the beginning of 1893, those who maintained belligerence against the dictator gathered around Luperón, who obtained the support of the Haitian president Florville Hyppolite. Dozens of exiles gathered in Cap-Haïtien in order to cross the border. Practically the entire exile participated, with Ignacio María González and Casimiro de Moya in leadership. Among the exiles who were involved in this project Eugenio Deschamps, Agustín Morales, Pablo Reyes, Pablo López, Juan Vicente Flores and Horacio Vásquez stood out. After some actions in the border area, Heureaux's pressure resulted in the Haitian government withdrawing support and the expatriates having to disperse among nearby countries.

== Final exile ==
Around the year 1895, General Luperón began to complain about having neuralgia from one of his inferior molars and had it removed, yet the cavity where the molar extracted had not been codifying or scaring, causing an infection. His feet would later begin to swell, from months of sitting down as he wrote his autobiography, so said his daughter at the time, and had been under medication from the doctors in Saint Thomas. In 1896, Doctor Mortensen had explained his grave medical situation, to which Luperón said, that if he is going to die in just a few days, he wanted to know how much the doctor charged for an embalmment so that his body may be sent to Puerto Plata. Up until that point, it had not occurred to him to return to the Dominican Republic while Ulises Heareaux was still president.

As Luperón remained in Saint Thomas, he concentrated on writing the Autobiographical Notes and Notes historical, text throughout which summarizes the unresolved dilemma between disenchantment and security in the old certainties. Despite the illness and the existential dilemmas that crossed him, he worked quickly, as if he were immersed in the usual battlefield: in 1895, he published the first volume and in each of the following two years the second and third appeared. The first volume was confiscated by order of the dictator, but seeing its contents as somewhat innocuous, he decided to let the following ones circulate, in which both the dictatorship and his person were furiously attacked.

In December 1896, in a gesture of gratitude for his past service, Heareaux went to visit Luperón on Saint Thomas, forgetting their rivalry, and offering to take Luperón back with him to Puerto Plata. Luperón accepts, but declines returning on the same boat as Heareaux, and traveled on an alternate vessel.

== Death ==
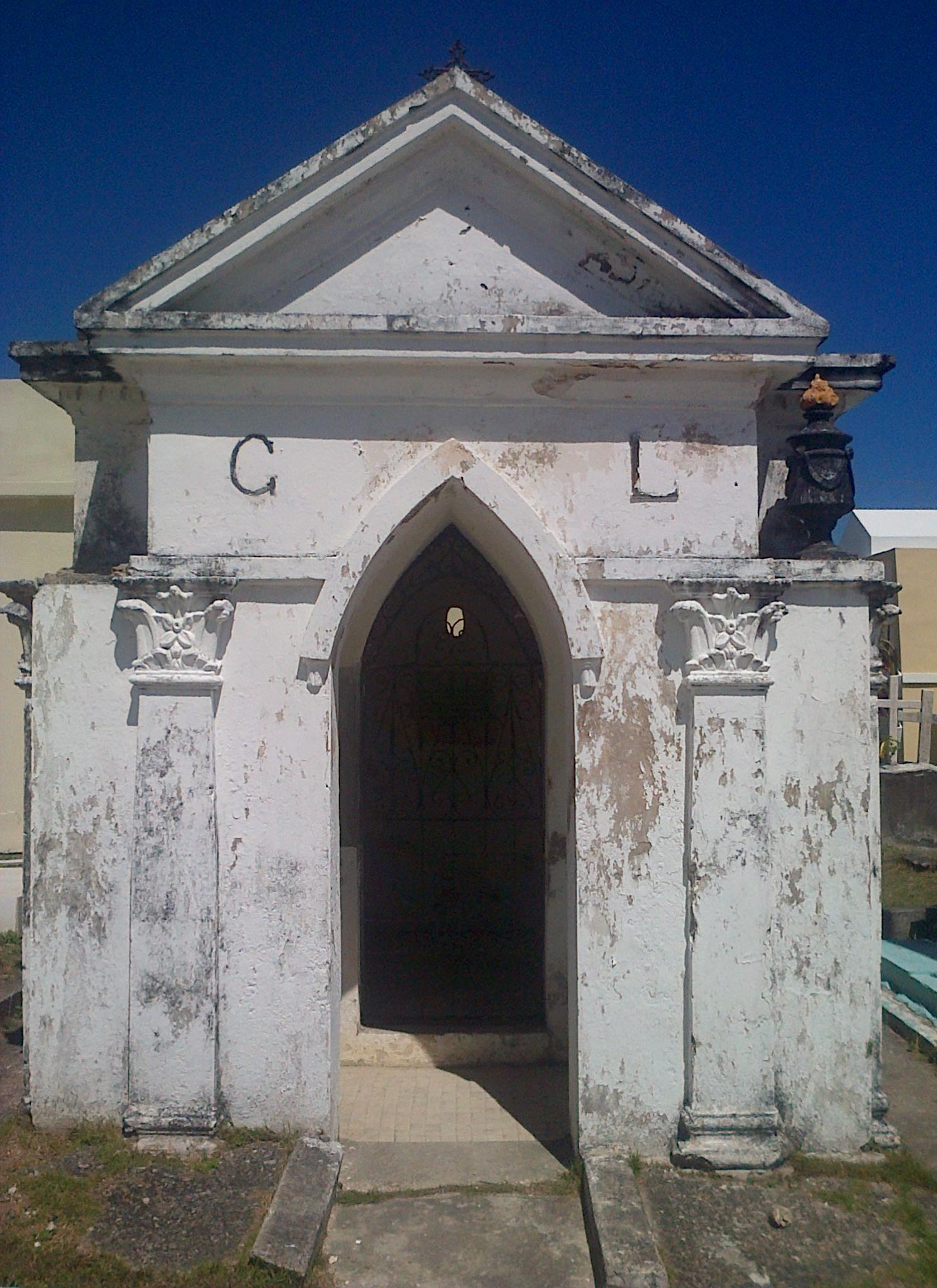
Former Tomb of Gregorio Luperón.

On December 15 of 1896, Luperón departs from Saint Thomas to Puerto Plata and arrived at the Port of Santo Domingo very ill, and remains on board. President Heareaux visits him on board and provided a foreign doctor named Dr. Fosse to assist him in San Felipe de Puerto Plata, and takes care of Luperón during the final 5 months of his life. For those months he had been bedridden and before his final breaths on May 20, 1897, said "Men like me, should not die laying down.", and as he attempted to lift his head, he died at 9:30 p.m. in his birthplace of Puerto Plata. He was survived by his wife of 32 years, Ana Luisa Tavares, and his two children, Luisa and Jacobo Leoncio.

== Legacy ==
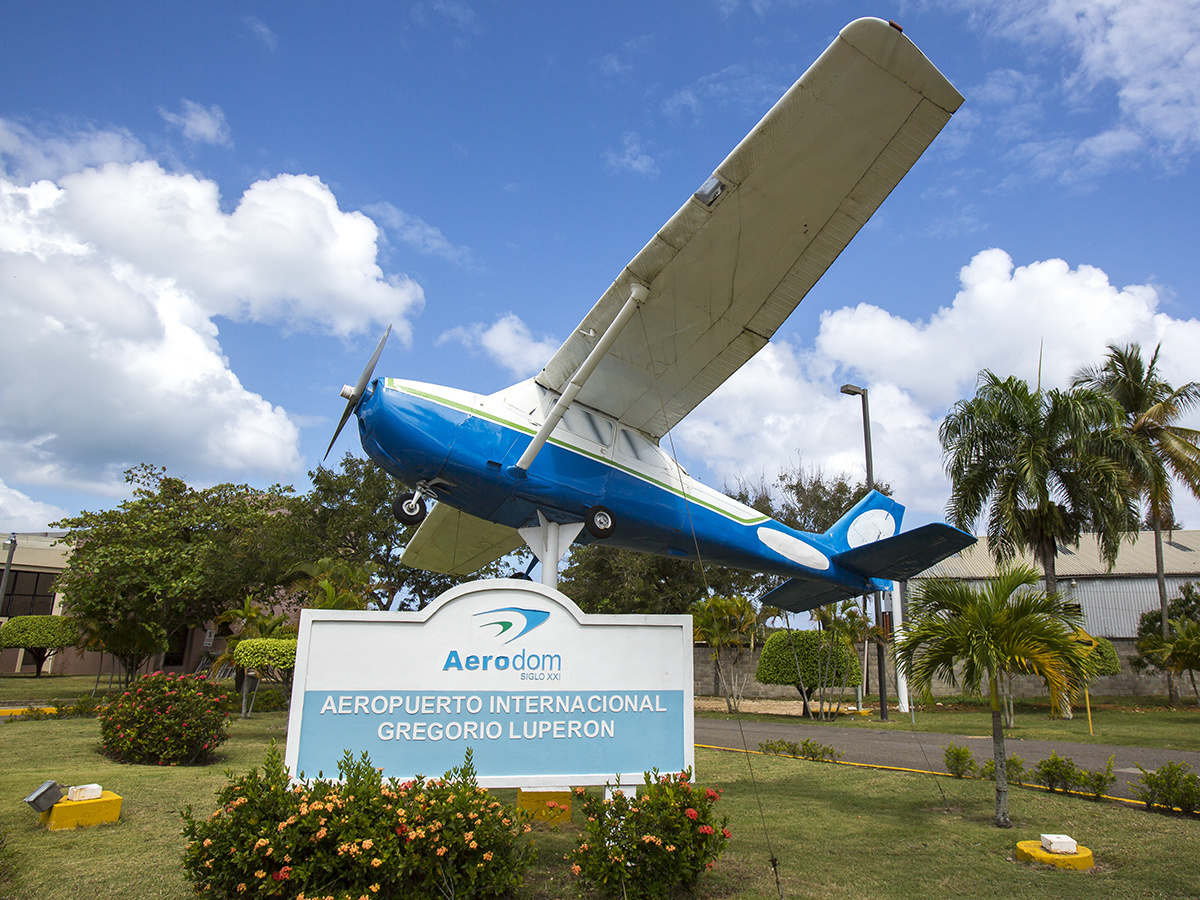
Gregorio Luperón International Airport

The town of Luperón 50 km west of Puerto Plata, the Gregorio Luperón International Airport in Puerto Plata, a metro station in Santo Domingo, and the Gregorio Luperón High School for Math & Science in New York are named after him.

His former home was renovated and converted into the Casa Museo General Gregorio Luperón museum that showcases his life through various exhibits.

== See also ==
- Dominican Restoration War
- Second Dominican Republic
- Ulises Heureaux
- Eugenio Maria de Hostos
- Ramón Emeterio Betances
- José Martí
- Juan Pablo Duarte
- Antillean Confederation

== Bibliography ==
- Cassá, Roberto. La épica trágica. Ecos. Año V, No. 6, 1998, pp. 87–158.
- Cordero Michel, Emilio. Luperón y Haití. Ecos. Año IV, No. 5, 1996, pp. 47–81.
- Ferrer Gutiérrez, Virgilio. Luperón, Brida y espuela. Santo Domingo, 2000.
- Luperón, Gregorio. Notas autobiográficas y apuntes históricos. 3 vols. Santo Domingo, 1974.
- Martínez, Rufino. Hombres dominicanos. Tomo I, Ciudad Trujillo, 1936.
- Rodríguez Demorizi, Emilio (ed.). Escritos de Luperón. Ciudad Trujillo, 1941.
- Rodríguez Objío, Manuel. Gregorio Luperón y historia de la Restauración. 2 vols. Santiago, 1939.
- Tolentino, Hugo. Gregorio Luperón: Biografía política. Santo Domingo, 1977.

Political offices
Preceded by Cesáreo Guillermo	President of the Dominican Republic; 1879–1880	Succeeded by Fernando Arturo de Meriño
Preceded by Ulises Francisco Espaillat	Vice President of the Dominican Republic; 1865–1865	Succeeded by Benigno Filomeno de Rojas

Political offices
Preceded by Ulises Francisco Espaillat during Dominican Restoration War	Vice President of the Dominican Republic; 1865	Succeeded by Benigno Filomeno de Rojas
Preceded by Cesáreo Guillermo	President of the Dominican Republic; 1879-1880	Succeeded by Fernando Arturo de Meriño
