= Monumento de Santiago =

Monument in Dominican Republic

Monument to the Heroes of the Restoration
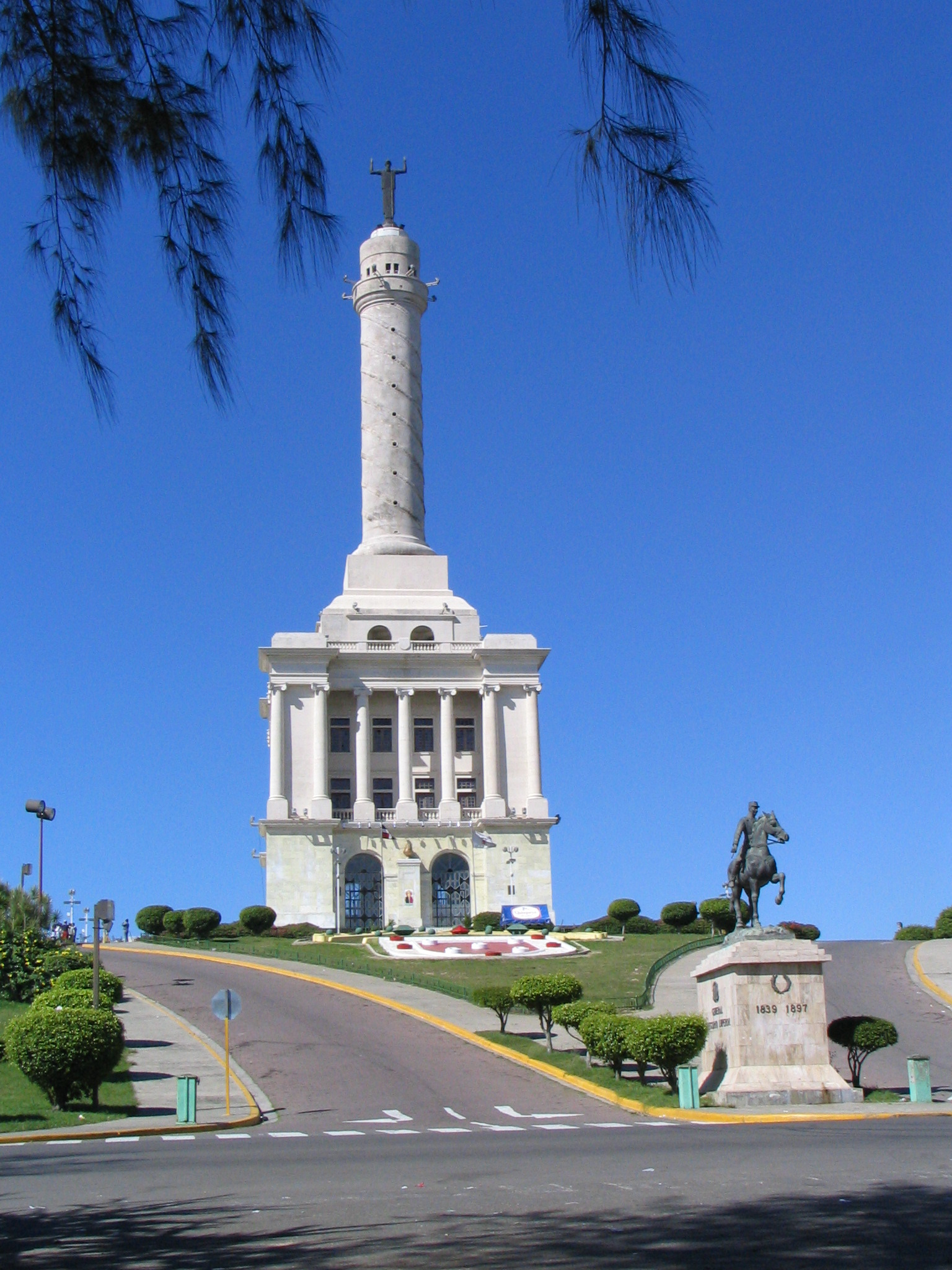
- Interactive map of Monument to the Heroes of the Restoration
- Location: Santiago de los Caballeros, Dominican Republic
- Coordinates: 19.4506°N 70.6950°W
- Designer: Henry Gazón Bona
- Type: Victory Column
- Material: Marble
- Length: 74 m (242.8 ft)
- Beginning date: 1944
- Completion date: 1944
- Dedicated to: Dominican Restoration of Independence

The Monumento a los Héroes de la Restauración (Monument to the Heroes of the Restoration) is a monument in the city of Santiago de los Caballeros in the Dominican Republic. It is the highest building in Santiago, and a major tourist attraction for the area. The monument is located on a hill in the middle of Santiago, with views of the city and surrounding mountains. It also has a surrounding park.

== History ==
It was originally built during the dictatorship of Rafael Leónidas Trujillo in 1944 as El Monumento a la Paz de Trujillo ("Trujillo's Monument to Peace"). He ordered its construction in his own honor. Symbolically, the monument was built for the centennial anniversary of the Dominican War of Independence, which was fought in 1844 to gain sovereignty from Haiti.

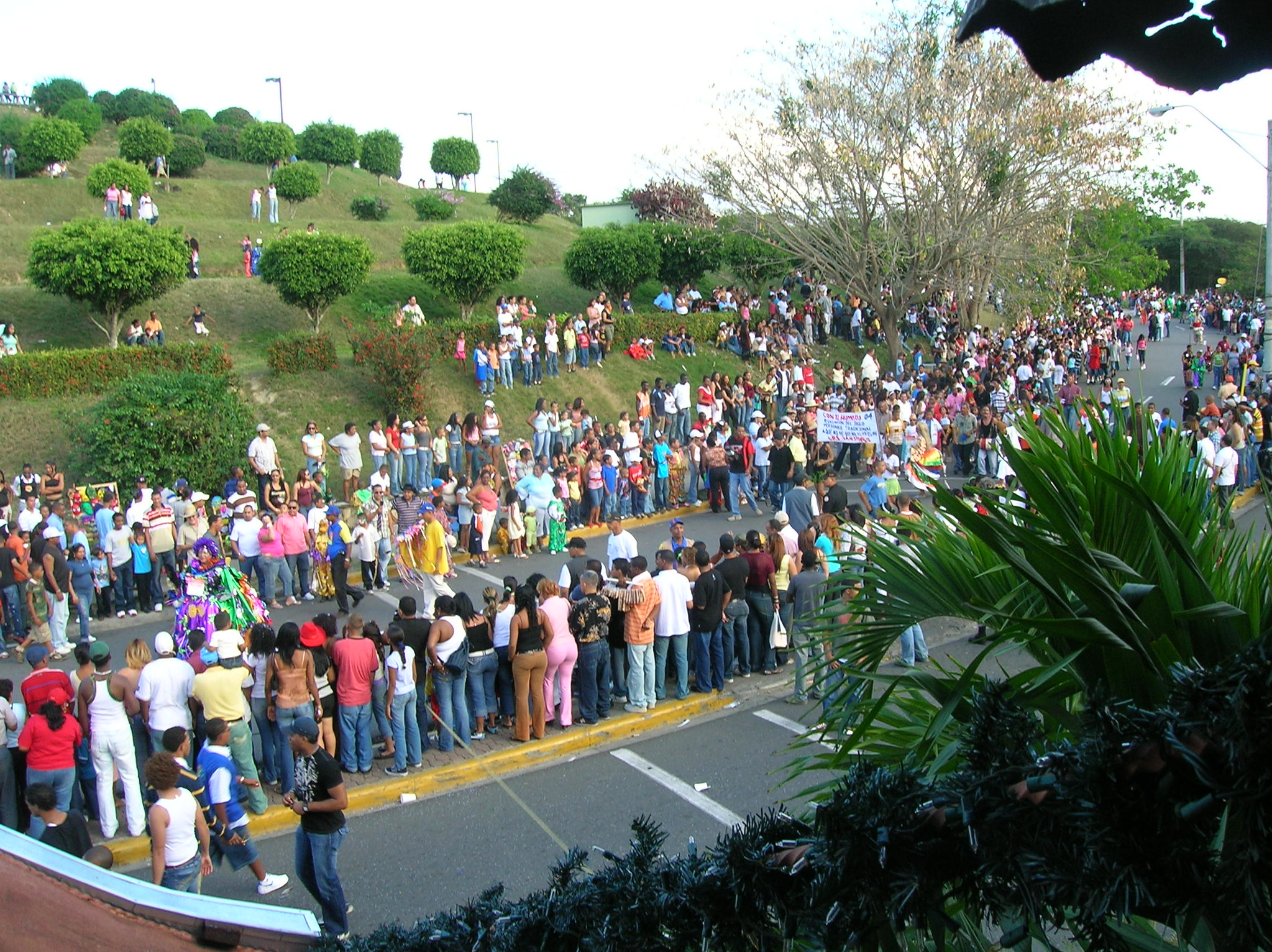
People near the monument.

After Trujillo's assassination in 1961, the government changed the name of the monument to "Monumento a los Héroes de la Restauración" (Monument to the Heroes of the Restoration). It is now dedicated to the heroes of the Dominican Restoration War, fought from 1863 to 1865 between Dominican Loyalist and Spanish forces. The heroes include (but are not limited to) Juan Pablo Duarte, Francisco del Rosario Sánchez and Gregorio Luperón. The monument was built from 1944 to 1952 and was inaugurated on September 30, 1953.

== Photo gallery ==
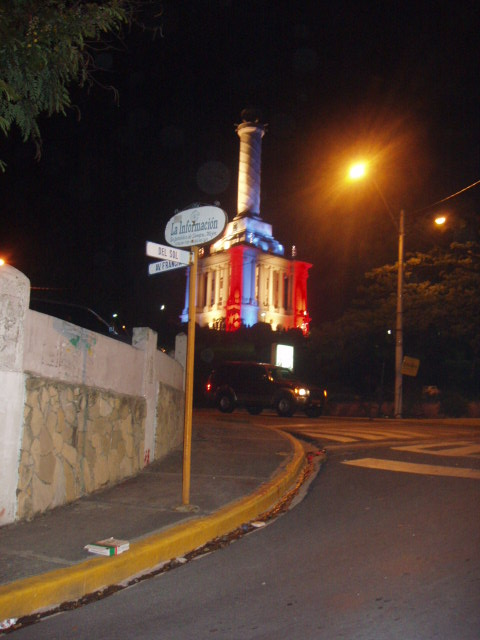

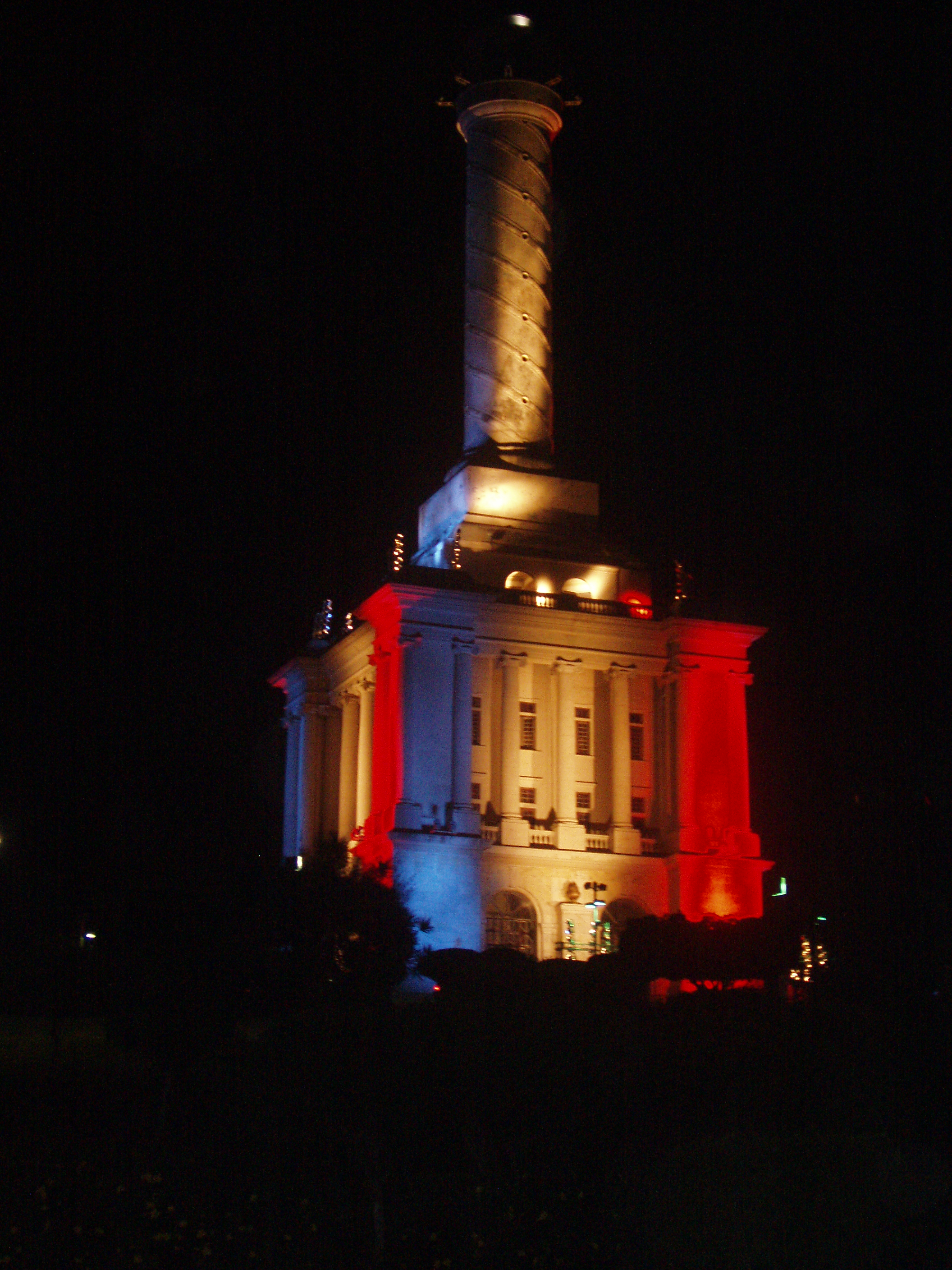

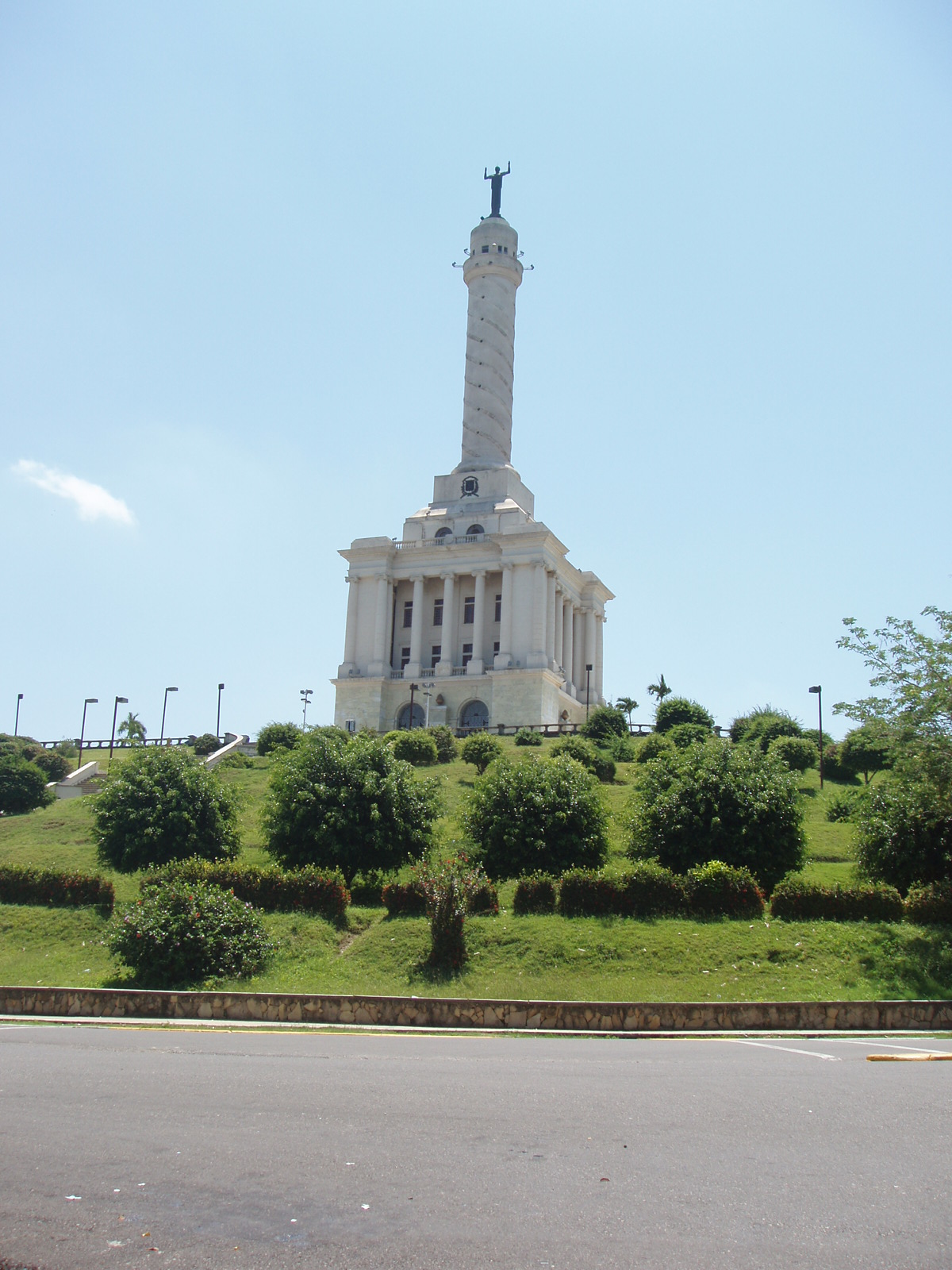

== See also ==
- Cibao
