= Six Years' War =

1868–1874 civil war in the Dominican Republic

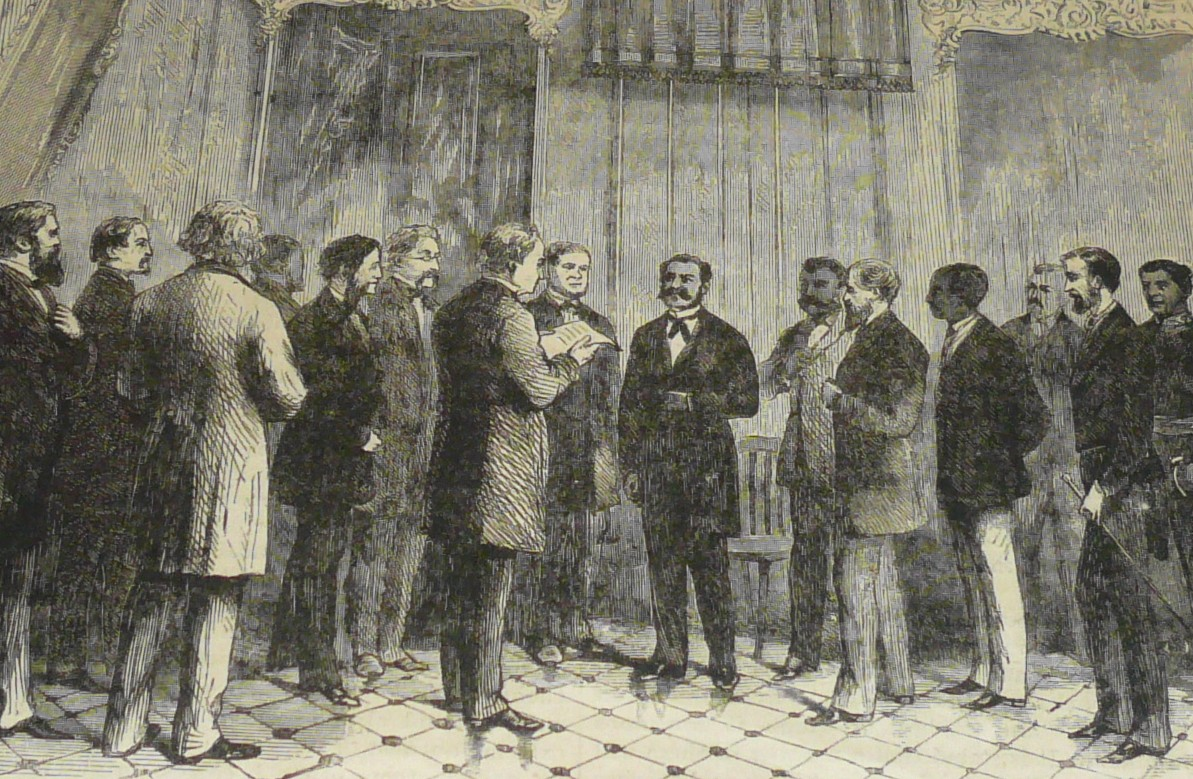
- In 1869, Báez negotiated a treaty of annexation with the United States
Date	2 May 1868 – 2 January 1874 (5 years and 8 months)
Location	Dominican Republic
Result	Liberal victory: Overthrow of Buenaventura Báez

Belligerents
Dominican Liberals	Dominican Conservatives

Commanders and leaders
Gregorio Luperón; José María Cabral; Timoteo Ogando; Marcos Evangelista Adón; José Cabrera; José Gabriel Luperón	Buenaventura Báez; Wenceslao Figuereo; Manuel María Gautier; Ignacio María González; Cesareo Guillermo; Jacinto de la Concha

The Six Years' War (Spanish: Guerra de los seis años) was a civil war in the Dominican Republic which lasted from 2 May 1868 to 2 January 1874 that "constituted the third war of independence fought by the Dominican people", in this case against the administration of President Buenaventura Báez, which in 1869 negotiated the Dominican Republic's annexation to the United States. According to the Dominican intellectual Pedro Henríquez Ureña, this war was a critical phase in the creation of Dominican national consciousness because, having already differentiated themselves from the Haitians in the first war of independence and the Spaniards in the second, the Dominicans asserted their incompatibility with the United States.

The war was fought mainly by irregulars (revolutionaries, intellectuals, conservative elements in the military) against the regular Dominican Army loyal to Báez. According to Hector Avalos, the civil war had a religious dimension, since the predominantly Catholic Dominicans, having already rejected Haitian Vodou, now decisively rejected American Protestantism.

The first fight was in Boca de Cachón. The rebels were defeated, because it was a small group of patriots. Unintimidated, Generals Timoteo and Andrés Ogando Encarnación, counting on the support of Generals Gregorio Luperón and José María Cabral, launched a new offensive. They seized Las Matas de Farfán, Neiba and other southern towns. By the end of 1871 they had overthrown the Báez government. Cabral took the presidency. In his autobiography, Luperón explains that "the revolution in the south, under the leadership of General Timoteo Ogando, was gaining ground. Cabral found in San Juan a respectable force, organized and with all the inhabitants unified in a single thought: overthrow Báez and save the homeland."

Dominican annexation was successful in the 1870 referendum, but was defeated in the United States Senate.

== See also ==
- Annexation of Santo Domingo
- United States occupation of the Dominican Republic (1916–1924)
- Dominican Civil War
