= José Gabriel Luperón =

Dominican revolutionary (1836–1873)

José Gabriel Luperón (1836–1873) was a Dominican soldier who fought in the Battle of Sabana Larga during the Dominican War of Independence. Due to his political affiliation, he fled to the United States, where he joined the Union Army under President Abraham Lincoln in the American Civil War.

== Biography ==
Luperón was born in 1836 in Puerto Plata during the Haitian regime in Santo Domingo. He was born to Pedro Castellanos, a Dominican of Spanish descent, and Nicolasa Duperon, a Cocolo immigrant. He was one of six children: three sons and three daughters. (One of his brothers was Gregorio Luperón, who would later rise to fame during the war of independence against Spain).

During the Dominican War of Independence, he fought in the 1856 Battle of Sabana Larga against Haitian forces under Emperor Faustin I. He later participated in siege of Parmantier in Samaná, during the Cibaeño Revolution.

In 1861, President Pedro Santana proclaimed the annexion to Spain. Luperón, expressing discontent, attempted to protest, but to no avail. He, just like his brother, Gregorio, faced persecution from royalist authorities, including General Juan Suero. It is likely that both brothers ended up in the United States, but Gregorio continued on back to the island to partake in the Dominican Restoration War, leaving José Gabriel behind.

Subsequently, the American Civil War had just erupted in the country. Luperón, sympathizing with the cause for emancipation for African Americans, joined the Union Forces, where he was assigned to the Northern Navy under President Abraham Lincoln and General Ulysses S. Grant. For his heroism, he reached the rank of Captain. After the Union victory, he returned to the Dominican Republic.

Upon his return, however, he was immediately persecuted by the new President, Buenaventura Báez. In 1868, the Six Years' War had broken out, during which Luperón had offered his services to the Blue Party. Because of this, was arrested by the authorities because of his insurgent activities. After an American consul representative in Puerto Plata intervened, he was released. He often left the country to evade harsh persecutions. He left for Haiti at some point, settling in Port-au-Prince, where he died in 1873 at age 37.

== Physiognomy and Character ==
Luperón was one of the many Hispanics to participate in the American Civil War. His brother Gregorio Luperón described him in Autobiographical Notes with the following:

The revolution that broke out in Haiti against the arbitrary President Salnave opened a path for him through Jacmel, which he knew how to exploit and take advantage of. He dispatched many Dominicans to Jacmel, sent a schooner to Río Hacha and Santa Marta, where there were more than 150 Dominican exiles, and the schooner took them to Jacmel. He directed General Cabral and his friends there, and later went there himself with General Pedro Valverde, General Enrique Favard, Colonel Don Antonio Madrigal, his secretary, and a brother of Luperón, a former officer of the Republic, José Gabriel Luperón, who had distinguished himself in the siege of Samaná in 1857, and in the battle of Sabana Larga, led by the never well-praised and distinguished General Don J. Luís Franco Bidó, a man worthy of the highest praise. That brave officer, Luperón's older brother, He protested against the Spanish annexation, and after this great crime was committed, he left the country and went to the United States to take part in the War for the Emancipation of Slaves. In this gigantic war, President Lincoln's government elevated him to the rank of Senior Adjutant Captain. He was the courageous officer who cut the chain that prevented the passage of Northern warships at the entrance to the Mississippi. Unaware of the part his brother had played in the events of the country, he returned to it in 1868, and Báez immediately arrested and expatriated him, for the crime of his surname, and perhaps because he had not wanted to be Spanish. This man was an athlete by strength and courage; he was a sailor and a man of battle who never refused a duel.

== See also ==
- Gregorio Luperón
- Abraham Lincoln
- American Civil War
