= Sabaneta de Yásica =

- Location within the Dominican Republic
- Coordinates: 19°40′0″N 70°23′0″W
- Country: Dominican Republic
- Province: Puerto Plata

Population (2008)
  - Total: 10,545
- Area codes: 809, 829

Sabaneta de Yásica is a small municipal district (distrito municipal – D.M.) in the Puerto Plata province on the north coast of the Dominican Republic.

Within Sabaneta are ten villages: Villa Islabon, Canta La Rana, Verdun, El Cementerio, El Cruze, La Gallera, El Framboyan, Los Robles, Palo Amarillo and Cuesta Barrosa. The district's cemetery is in the village of El Cementerio.

The area has one public school (Enriqueta Omler) and one private school (Colegio Evangelico de Formacion Humana), a number of supermarkets, restaurants, stores, mechanics and an internet café. It has one medical center and various drugstores, but no clinic though there are two just 3 and 5 minutes away in the next town, Villa Progresso.

There is a basketball court and numerous billiard sites which serve cold beer and where dominoes can be played. It is about 10 minutes away from Cabarete with its restaurants, bars, and discos; 20 minutes away from the airport in Sosúa; and 40 minutes away from the Playa Grande, a notable beach.

A river called the Rio Yasica flows through the district. Grown here are fruits such as mangoes, cajuiles, and there are large plantations of yucca and plantains.

== Sources ==
- http://nona.net/features/map/placedetail.1532751/Sabaneta%20de%20Y%C3%A1sica/
- – World-Gazetteer.com
