= Pedro Corto =

- Location within the Dominican Republic
- Coordinates: 18°51′0″N 71°25′12″W
- Country: Dominican Republic
- Province: San Juan

Population (2008)
  - Total: 2,070

Pedro Corto is a town in the San Juan province of the Dominican Republic.

== Sources ==
- – World-Gazetteer.com
