= Dominican Army =

Army of the Dominican Republic

- Ejército de República Dominicana
- Emblem of the Dominican Army
- Founded: 27 February 1844
- Country: Dominican Republic
- Branch: Army
- Type: Army
- Role: Defend the Dominican Republic and serve its citizens. Support other branches and civil authorities in time of emergencies.
- Size: 28,750
- Part of: Armed Forces of the Dominican Republic
- Anniversaries: February 27
- Engagements: Dominican War of Independence; Dominican Restoration War; Six Years' War; Dominican Civil War (1911–1912); Dominican Civil War (1914); U.S. Marine occupation of the Dominican Republic; Cuban invasion of the Dominican Republic; Dominican Civil War; Iraq War

Commanders
- Notable commanders: Gen. Matías Ramón Mella; Gen. Rafael Leonidas Trujillo; Gen. Gregorio Luperon

Insignia
- Flag

The Dominican Army (Spanish: Ejército de República Dominicana), is one of the three branches of the Armed Forces of the Dominican Republic, together with the Navy and the Air Force.

The Dominican army with 28,750 active duty personnel consists of six infantry brigades, a combat support brigade, a combat service support brigade and the air cavalry squadron.

The army's standard issue rifle is the M16 rifle which is currently being replaced by the IWI Arad. Armored assets include twelve American M41A1 light tanks, twenty armored personnel carriers, and eight Cadillac Gage V-150 Commando armored vehicles. The artillery units are equipped with twenty-two 105 mm towed howitzers.

== History ==
=== The Captaincy General of Santo Domingo and the War of Reconquest ===
The island of Hispaniola served as a key outpost throughout the colonial period and housed the Audiencia of Santo Domingo—the first in the Americas (established in 1511)—whose jurisdiction extended across the entire Caribbean. In 1697, the Peace of Ryswick divided the island into two communities: the Spanish in the east and the French in the west. This arrangement lasted until 1795, when sovereignty over the western part of the island was ceded to France under the Treaty of Basel; Spanish sovereignty was subsequently restored in 1808. The territory declared independence in 1821, was occupied by Haiti in 1822, regained its freedom in 1844, and was reincorporated into Spain in 1861 by a decision of its own leaders, before finally establishing itself as an independent republic in 1865.

Due to these political upheavals and fluctuations, as well as its strategic location, Santo Domingo has a long and complex military history. Externally, the island’s experience during this period was characterized by a rational defense strategy and relative calm regarding international conflicts fought on its soil. Internally, however, the border between Spanish and French territories—a vague and poorly defined North-South line—was a zone of constant friction and conflict.

Deployment of militia units in the Captaincy General of Santo Domingo as of 1721:

Infantry	C.th	Captains	Ensigns	Sargeants	Cor. Of.	Corporal	Soldiers	Total
Santo Domingo	5	5	5	5	36	18	439	508
San Carlos	2	2	2	2	3	9	119	137
San Lorenzo de los Negros Mina	2	2	2	2	8	8	96	118
Santiago	6	6	6	6	28	19	561	626
La Vega	2	2	2	2	8	8	312	334
Cotuí	2	2	2	2	1	7	135	149
Hincha	2	2	2	2	1	8	190	205
Bánica	2	2	2	2	2	3	127	138
Azua	3	3	3	3	4	7	206	226
Higüey	1	1	1	1	0	3	54	60
El Seibo	2	2	2	2	4	9	162	181
Bayaguana	1	1	1	1	0	5	78	86
Monte Plata	1	1	1	1	2	2	60	67
Total	31	31	31	31	97	106	2539	2835
Cavalry	C.th	Captains	Ensigns	Sargeants	Cor. Of.	Corporal	Soldiers	Total
Santo Domingo	2	2	2	2	2	7	74	89
Santiago	1	1	1	1	1	2	49	55
Azua	1	1	1	1	1	3	53	60
Total	4	4	4	4	4	12	176	204
Total General								3039

In 1738, the "Reglamento para la guarnición de la plaza de Santo Domingo, en la isla Española, castillos y fuertes de su jurisdicción" "Regulations for the garrison of the stronghold of Santo Domingo, on the island of Hispaniola, and the castles and forts within its jurisdiction" were promulgated. The aim was to rectify many flaws observed in the army stationed on the island, such as: unequal company staffing (with surpluses in some and shortages in others); pay discrepancies among officers of the same rank—including the paradox of some soldiers earning more than sergeants; a lack of uniformity in military attire; and insufficient orders to ensure discipline. To remedy these deficiencies, the Regulations established, among others, the following provisions:

Creation of the Batallón Fijo (Permanent Battalion) comprising 637 men—including sergeants and drummers—deemed necessary for a vigorous defense. It would consist of seven infantry companies (one being a grenadier company), one artillery company, and two cavalry companies, replacing the Northern and Southern Troops.

Equal salaries commensurate with rank and command, plus additional bonuses for officers and non-commissioned officers if their companies maintained a specific number of soldiers. No individual of enlisted or non-commissioned rank could hold two positions or draw two salaries.

Authorization for half the men in each company to be natives of the island, provided they met the following requirements: descent from Peninsular Spaniards, bachelor status, no other occupation (exclusive dedication to the army was mandated for all Armed Forces members), residence in the barracks, and performance of service on equal terms with those from Spain.

Drafting age: sixteen for those born in Spain and twenty for criollos (locally born Spaniards).

The militia cavalry was placed under the command of the senior captain of the two newly formed frontier cavalry companies.

Standardization of uniforms, with each company featuring distinct insignia. A requirement for a certain level of education (literacy) to qualify as a non-commissioned officer.

The establishment of an academy to train soldiers, with the aim of producing well-prepared military personnel. The curriculum was to include military architecture, the defense and assault of strongholds, weapons handling, battalion and squadron formation, geometry, trigonometry, cosmography, navigation, and other disciplines useful for service at sea and on land, as specified in the aforementioned Regulation.

From 1916 to 1924, the United States occupied the Dominican Republic under the U.S. Navy and Marine Corps, disbanding existing militias and establishing a Dominican Constabulary Guard trained by U.S. Marines, which contributed to the later development of the Dominican Army.

In the 1930s and 1940s, the army under Rafael Trujillo numbered approximately 3,500–5,800 troops.

In the late 1940s, a small arms factory was established in San Cristóbal, near Santo Domingo. By the late 1950s, the Dominican Republic had achieved near self-sufficiency in the production of small arms. However, after the assassination of Trujillo in 1961, this capacity declined.

== Organization ==
=== Under Army Headquarters ===
Headquarters, Dominican Army in Comendador, Elías Piña Province

- 1st Presidential Guards Regiment BRIGADIER A. DIAZ LUCIANO TEJEDA (Santo Domingo)
  - Foot Guards Battalion
  - Presidential Security Special Forces Battalion (Rapid Response)
- 2nd Honor Guard Regiment of the Ministry of Defence (Santo Domingo)
- Special Operations Brigade
  - 1st Special Forces Battalion
  - 2nd Special Operations Battalion
  - 6th Mountain Rifles Battalion (Constanza)
- 1st Air Cavalry Squadron "Major Aníbal Vallejo Pilot Sosa" (La Isabela International Airport):
  - 2 Robinson R-44
  - 4 Robinson R-22
  - 5 Bell OH-58C
  - 3 Bell OH-58A +

=== Under the Operations Command ===
1st Infantry Brigade - CG Santo Domingo

- 1st Infantry Battalion JUAN PABLO DUARTE (Com. And all elements at Camp August 16, Santo Domingo).
- 2 Infantry Battalion Francisco del Rosario Sánchez (Com. And all elements at Camp August 16, Santo Domingo).
- 3 Infantry Battalion MATIAS RAMON MELLA (Com. And all elements at Camp Ramon Mella, San Cristobal).
- Reconnaissance and Security Company (Camp August 16, Santo Domingo) - equipped with soft skin vehicles, including SUVs.
- Heavy Mortars battery (Camp August 16, Santo Domingo) - equipped with four M30 4.2 inch mortars.
- 1st Public Security Battalion (Urban Operations)

2nd Infantry Brigade - CG Santiago

- 5th Infantry Battalion (Com., Support Company Infantry Companies & 5, 6 & 7, all in Santiago.)
- 7 Infantry Battalion (Com, and Support Company Infantry Company 12 in San Francisco de Macorís,. Companies Infantry Cotuy 11, 13 & 14 in Nagua Samana).
- 8 Infantry Battalion (Com, and Support Company Infantry Company 8 in Puerto Plata, infantry companies Moca 9 & 10 in San José de las Matas).
- Reconnaissance Platoon (Fortaleza Fernando Valerio, Santiago.) - Equipped with soft-skin vehicles, including SUVs.
- Howitzer Battery (Fortaleza Fernando Valerio, Santiago.) - Equipped with four M-101 105 mm howitzers.
- 6th Battalion (in reserve)
- 7th Battalion (in reserve)
- 11th battalion (reserve)

3rd Infantry Brigade - CG San Juan de la Maguana

- 12 Infantry Battalion (Com, and Support Company Infantry Company 22 at Azua).

Fortaleza March 19, headquarters of Infantry Battalion 12 Azua

- 13 Infantry Battalion (Com, and Support Company Infantry Company 23 at San Juan de la Maguana, 24 Infantry Company in Elias Pina).
- 14 Infantry Battalion (Com and Support Company in Las Matas de Farfán,. Infantry Company 25 at Pedro Santana).
- Reconnaissance Platoon - equipped with soft skin vehicles, including SUVs.
- Heavy Mortars battery - ECIA equipped with four 120 mm Mortars.

4th Infantry Brigade - CG Mao

- 9 Macheteros Infantry Battalion (Com. And all elements at Fte. November 19, Mao).
- 10 Infantry Battalion 10 (Com, and Support Company Infantry Company 16 at Dajabon, 15 Infantry Companies in Monte Cristi & Restoration 17).
- 11 Infantry Battalion (Com and Support Company in La Vega, 26 Infantry Company at Sabana Iglesia).

Reconnisance Platoon (Source November 19, Mao.) - Equipped with soft skin vehicles, including SUVs.
Heavy Mortars battery (Fte November 19, Mao.) - - ECIA equipped with four 120 mm mortars.

5th Infantry Brigade - CG Barahona

- 15 Infantry Battalion (Com and Support Company at Barahona,. 18 & 19 Infantry Companies at Jimani Neiba).
- 16 Infantry Battalion (Com, and Support Company Infantry Company 20 at Duvergé;. Infantry Company 21 at Pedernales).

Exploration Platoon - equipped with soft skin vehicles, including SUVs.
Heavy Mortars battery - ECIA equipped with four 120 mm mortars.

6th Infantry Brigade - CG San Pedro de Macoris

- 4 Infantry Battalion (Com & Support Company Infantry Company 1 at San Pedro de Macoris,. Infantry Company 2 at La Romana)
- 17 Infantry Battalion (Com & Support Company Infantry Company 4 at El Seybo;. Infantry Company 3 at Higuey)

Exploration Platoon - equipped with soft skin vehicles, including SUVs.
Heavy Mortars battery ECIA equipped with four 120 mm mortars

7th Infantry Brigade – CG San Francisco de Macorís.

- 1st Infantry Battalion in Samaná.
- 2nd Infantry Battalion in San Francisco de Macorís.
- 3rd Infantry Battalion in Nagua.

Combat Support Brigade - CG Villa Mella, Santo Domingo

- Armored Battalion (Com and all elements at Villa Mella.):

1st Squadron 12 M-41 light tank.
2nd Squadron 8 V-150 Commando AFVs. 4 currently with 1st Presidential Guard Regiment, 2 were transferred to Counter-Terrorist Group.
3rd Squadron 16 M3 A1 half-tracks.

- Artillery Battalion (Com and all elements at Villa Mella.): 12 Reinosa 105 mm / 26 120 mm howitzers and 8 ECIA mortars
- Engineer Battalion (Com and all elements at Santo Domingo).
- Communications Battalion (Com and all elements at Santo Domingo).

Service Support Brigade - CG Santo Domingo

- Service Support Battalion (Com and all elements at Santo Domingo.):
- Quartermaster Company (Santo Domingo)
- Medical Company (Santo Domingo)
- Military Police Company (Santo Domingo)
- Materiel and Equipment Maintenance Battalion (CG in Santo Domingo); which includes the Armeros Company at San Cristobal).
- Transport Battalion (HQ and all elements at Santo Domingo).

GRADUATE SCHOOL OF MILITARY STUDIES, ERD.

- Army Command and Staff College (based at San Isidro)

GENERAL MANAGEMENT TRAINING

- Military School (based at San Isidro)
- Army Training Battalion (based at Camp February 27 at Santo Domingo)

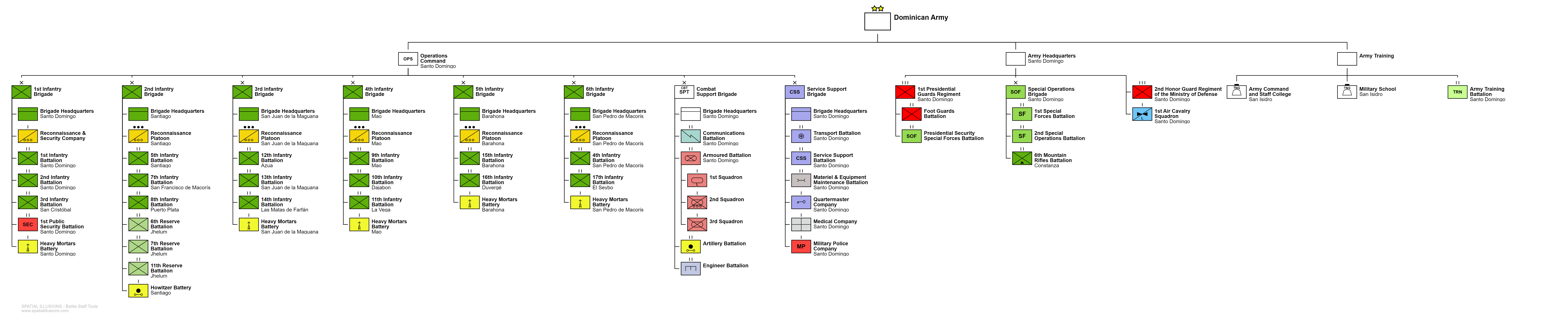
Dominican Republic Army Structure
