= Ramón María Mella =

Dominican independence activist (1837–1868)

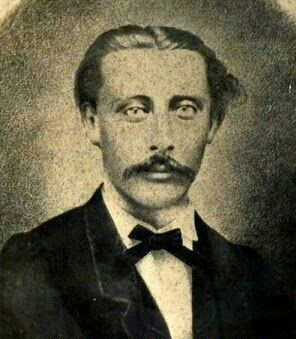
- Mella c. 1860s
- Born: July 27, 1837; Santo Domingo, Dominican Republic
- Died: March 21, 1868 (aged 30); Santo Domingo, Dominican Republic
- Cause of death: Execution
- Relatives: Matías Ramón Mella (father); Julio Antonio Mella (nephew)
- Military career
- Allegiance: Dominican Republic
- Branch: Dominican Army
- Service years: 1861–1868
- Rank: General
- Conflicts: Dominican Restoration War; Six Years' War
- Awards: National hero

Ramón María Mella Brea (July 27, 1837 – March 21, 1868) was a Dominican independence activist. Son of the hero Matías Ramón Mella, he participated in the struggles against Spain in the 1860s. He was a martyr of the Six Years' War.

== Biography ==
He was born on July 27, 1837. He was born to Josefa Brea and Matías Ramón Mella, one of the Founding Fathers of the Dominican Republic. He has partial Canarian ancestry through his paternal great-grandmother, Juana Álvarez Pereyra.

When the annexation to Spain was proclaimed in 1861, he resided in Jamao, where his father managed his own wood cuts. After the Cry of Capotillo on August 16, 1863, He went to the front and was under the orders of General Gregorio de Lora, with whom he went to fight in the Battle of Santiago (1863) in September 1863. In March 1864, he was on duty in Monte Cristi. He carried out the entire restoration campaign, even after the death of his father in June of that same year, and eventually reached the rank of brigadier general.

In the political struggles recorded after the Dominican Republic attained its independence from Spain, he joined the Blue Party (Dominican Republic). Due to his political affiliation, he was arrested during the Six Years' War against Buenaventura Báez, who locked him up in the Ozama Fortress, in the capital city of Santo Domingo. On March 21, 1868, at aged 30, he died in prison, as a consequence, as it was officially said, of the fractures and blows suffered by accidentally falling from his own feet. (Other sources claim he was actually thrown from the top of the tip of the fortress, falling to his death).

== See also ==
- Matías Ramón Mella
- Dominican Restoration War
- Six Years' War
