= Juan Nouesí =

Dominican activist (1810–1881)

Juan Nouesí Laffite (November 4, 1810 – October 29, 1881) was a Dominican activist and soldier. Between the 1840s and the 1870s, he was said to have fought in the wars against Haiti, Spain, and the United States.

== Early life ==
He was born on November 4, 1810, in Marmolejos, a rural section of the old common of Blanco, (today Luperón). His father was called Juan Francisco Laffite (1782–1854) and his mother, María del Carmen Nouesít. He was of African ancestry. He was the only son of two children; his sister, Maria Rosa Lafitte, died during the war against Spain in 1864. He preferably used the last maternal name, that people's speech and vulgar use modified it to convert it into Nouesi or Nouezí as used today by his descendants.

In the 1840s, he joined the ranks of the Liberation Army during the Dominican War of Independence. By the end of the 1850s, he served the new order in the position of Captain Pedáneo in his region.

== Santo Domingo War ==
In 1861, Spain regained control over the territory, and the colony was reestablished. In 1863, Nouesí was one of the first to join the early insurrections that preceded the Dominican Restoration War. He was said to have joined with his troops made up of peasants recruited in the western area of Puerto Plata, called Los Rancheros. At the head of his soldiers, and in tactical coordination with Gregorio de Lora and other commanders, he led an attack on the Spanish forces in Puerto Plata on August 27, 1863. The Spanish received huge reinforcements from Cuba and Puerto Rico, thanks to which they maintained control of the city and, in a vigorous counterattack, pushed the patriots into the fields.

The city of Puerto Plata remained in the hands of the Spanish, but this was short lived. In the days of the siege of Santiago, Nouesí and his troops caused heavy casualties while blocking the passage of the reinforcements sent to that city from Puerto Plata. He was in Santiago, in full action, on September 6, 1863, the day that General Gaspar Polanco ordered the thorough attack on the San Luis Fortress, the last stronghold of the Spanish, and the city burned. Nouesí immediately returned to his region, to combine actions with the forces of other leaders such as Francisco Reyes Marión, Pedro Gregorio Martínez and Gregorio de Lora.

They marched in defeat from Santiago to Puerto Plata. Roads were difficult to navigate and they were often subjected to heavy fire, knife assaults, and surprise attacks in difficult passes. The retreat was made complicated by entire families of Spanishized natives who marched with them, and by other families that the Spanish forcibly took as hostages. They also carried the wounded with them in litters.

An example of anguish that the action of the Dominicans condemned the invaders, offers it a passage that occurred to the advance guard that Juan Suero commanded in the retreat to Puerto Plata. The story goes that upon arriving at Llano de Pérez, Suero ordered to stop and take a breather in the apparent stillness of the country house and the bowers that he had in that place. And as soon as they began to arrange the women and the wounded, when a cloud of smoke began to torment them, and the fire began to surround it, because the restaurateur chief and his Rancheros guerrillas had set fire to the nearby cane fields and the fire, fueled by the burning sun and the breeze that blew abundantly, threatened the besieged caravan. Much to his regret, Suero and his harassed entourage had to continue the painful march. On January 26, 1864, he was in Altamira and was called by government; on February 9, he was appointed Commander of Weapons of Santiago. Twenty days after the government arrived, there were reports of a threat landing at La Isabela and the famous chief of Los Rancheros was transferred to that point on the North coast, which was considered in danger.

As a reward for his contributions to the independence from Haiti and Spain, he was allowed to return to his position as Arms of Command in Santiago.

== Six Years’ War, arrest, and death ==
After the Dominican Republic regained its independence, Nouesí returned to his home in Marmolejos. In February 1873, during the Six Years’ War against the anti-national dictatorship of Buenaventura Báez, Nouesí launched an insurrection that was quickly repressed by the authorities. He took refuge with two of his children in the English consulate in Puerto Plata and the authorities trampled all norms of international relations, penetrated the consulate and they took them out. With the support of the cannons of the ship he commanded, and which was anchored in front of the city, an English commander demanded the surrender of the persecuted, the government relented and Nouesí and his children were taken to Haiti. There, they added their efforts to those of the numerous Dominicans who were fighting against Báez and their annexationist projects then.

Back to the environment of his home and his possessions in Marmolejos, he lived in retirement in later years until his death on October 29, 1881. His descendants have continued to populate the fields and cities from the province of Puerto Plata, where a street designated with the name of Juan Laffite, gives honor to this gallant and legendary general of the wars of Dominican independence.

== See also ==
- Dominican Restoration War
- Six Years' War
- Pedro Gregorio Martínez
- Juan Suero
