= Francisco Reyes Marión =

National hero of the Dominican Republic

Francisco Reyes Marión was a soldier of the Dominican Republic. He fought in wars against Haiti, Spain, and the United States.

== Life ==
A native of Sabaneta. He was a veteran of the Battle of Sabana Larga, fought on January 24, 1856, against the last Haitian invasion. During the Cibaeño Revolution against Buenaventura Báez he fought under the orders of Matias Ramon Mella in the assault on Samaná in 1858. He resided in Puerto Plata since long before the annexation and under that regime he was assigned to Reserves with rank of commander.

Reyes Marión intervened in the national war in Puerto Plata with Gregorio de Lora. He arrived with him to the Battle of Santiago. On September 6, 1863, Lora heroically died in combat and it was Reyes Marion's turn to assume immediate command of the troops that the brave martyr commanded. Returning to the Puerto Plata line, in September 1863, he was left in the canton of Jácuba, next to General Pedro Gregorio Martínez, Juan Bonilla and Rasín Isurún. He had a close personal friendship with Martínez and when in January 1865 he deserted and abandoned his position and came into conflict with the authority of President Gaspar Polanco, Reyes Marión volunteered to mediate in an attempt to achieve the return of the deserter. Before, Reyes Marión had already operated in Puerto Plata fields for years with generals like Juan de Jesús Salcedo and Manuel Rodríguez (El Chivo). In January 1864 he had been appointed head of the canton of Maluis; He was in the general camp of Las Jabillas, and on February 10 he was sent to exercise command at the port of Blanco, today Luperón. On October 27, he received the official letter designating him Head of the Puerto Caballo Military Post.

Consistent with its past, Restoration patriot, he fought mainly on the liberal and nationalist side, later grouped under the name of the National Liberal Party, also called the Blue Party, antagonist from the Red Party, by Buenaventura Báez. He never strayed from his vocation towards military activity, even when the overwhelming weight of the years had already fallen on him. Reyes Marión lived in Puerto Plata until he died in March 1908, in the midst of longing for his good times as an active soldier.

== Historiography ==
Reyes Marión was one of the few leaders of the Independence and Restoration period to have survive until the 20th century. He was described with the following terms:

...Very old soldier, usual- Born to live enjoying and sharing with the soldier…

== See also ==
- Pedro Gregorio Martínez
