= Pedro Gregorio Martínez =

Dominican independence fighter (1819–1890)

Pedro Gregorio Martínez (1819 – November 17, 1890) was a Dominican soldier of the Dominican Restoration War.

== Early life ==
He was born in Sosúa in 1819. He was born to Gregorio Martínez and Catalina Abreu. He was said to have been one of the richest and most influential landowners in the entire North Coast.

== Military career ==
When the Spanish regime was imposed in 1861, he admitted the facts and even agreed to be government representative in Sosúa, where Martínez had his home. But when the clarity of war and the feeling of national dignity reached his conscience, Pedro Martínez, from Sosúa, as called him to differentiate him from his namesake, Pedro Martínez, that of Muñoz, went to the front of battle.

He gathered his men and in intelligence with Juan Nouesí organized the assault on Puerto Plata on August 27, 1863. The Spanish held the plaza and counterattacked, the patriotic forces retreated to remote rural areas. Martínez, like his comrade-in-arms Gregorio de Lora, went to Santiago with his troops to reinforce the site against the occupiers. He moved to the camp in Jácuba, a point located between the two cities and on September 12, his men, together with those of commanders Juan Bonilla, Francisco Reyes Marión, Rasín Isurún and Norberto Reinoso, stopped the advance and made the columns retreat composed of generals Palanca and Primo de Rivera, made up of two thousand five hundred men, who were trying to force the passage towards Santiago.

On February 9, 1864, Pedro Gregorio Martínez was promoted from colonel to general. In July, he appointed him Governor of Santiago; On August 25, he was appointed Deputy to the Minister of War and on September 27, Commander of Weapons of San José de las Matas. He also held the governorship of Santiago under the government of General Gaspar Polanco. Before Polanco's fall he was already in disagreement with him, he had been absent from Santiago and a mediation effort was necessary for Martínez to report back to his position and reconciliation was achieved. However, he joined Pedro Antonio Pimentel's pronouncement in January 1865 and, together with Benito Monción and Pimentel himself, formed part of the War Commission. Persecution broke out against many of Gaspar Polanco's supporters and Martínez was extremely active in that task in Puerto Plata. Among those arrested on his order was a young ensign Ulises Heureaux, whom they nicknamed Lilís.

== Final years and death ==
Shortly after the withdrawal of the Spaniards, Pedro Antonio Pimentel fell and José María Cabral ascended to the presidency. Then the persecuted one was Martínez. They arrested him, transferred him to the Capital and was confined there, under the surveillance of the high police. After the Six Years administration, from 1868 to 1874, he retired almost completely from public life. His life ran until it was exhausted between agriculture and the pleasure of women. He died on his farm Sosúa on November 17, 1890, and left among his most permanent inheritances, the largest descendants and the surname most abundant on the entire coast North and Northeast.

== See also ==
- Pedro Antonio Pimentel
- José María Cabral
- Ulises Heureaux
