= Dominican Act of Independence (1863) =

1863 document of the restoration of Dominican independence

- Created: September 14, 1863
- Author: Dominican Restorationists
- Signatories: Pedro Antonio Pimentel, Gaspar Polanco, Gregorio Luperón, José Antonio Salcedo, Benito Monción, Ulises Francisco Espaillat, José María Cabral, etc...

The Dominican Act of Independence (1863), was a formal declaration of independence issued during the Dominican Restoration War (1863–1865), a conflict aimed at reestablishing the independence of the Dominican Republic following its annexation by Spain in 1861. The annexation, orchestrated by General Pedro Santana, now Marquess of Las Carreras, was met with initially with indifference and casual resistance at best, but with widespread resistance by 1863, as many Dominicans increasingly viewed it as a betrayal of the sovereignty gained in 1844 and that the Spanish rule did not provide the so promised benefits.

Proclaimed in Santiago de los Caballeros right after the bloody and destructive siege/battle to capture it, the act denounced Spanish rule, citing political oppression, economic exploitation, and violations of Dominican rights under colonial administration. It justified the armed uprising against Spanish authorities and reaffirmed the Dominican people's resolve to restore their nation’s independence. The war ultimately resulted in Spain’s withdrawal in 1865, marking the successful restoration of the Dominican Republic as a sovereign state.

== Context ==
The war had begun on August 16, when insurgents led by Santiago Rodríguez, crossing the border from Haiti, launched the Grito del Capotillo, marking the definitive start of the revolt against spanish rule, now known as the Restoration War. In the following weeks, the movement gained significant momentum throughout the Cibao Valley, with troops now under the command of Gaspar Polanco, the last remaining general of the defunct Republic.

From September 6 to 13, an intense battle-siege took place for the control of Santiago de los Caballeros, the regional capital. At the cost of many lives on both sides and the near-total destruction of the city by fire, Spanish forces were forced to retreat to Puerto Plata. With José Antonio Salcedo as their president, the restoration forces now set out to organize the government of the republic in arms.

In his book History of the Restoration, Historian Pedro María Archambault recounts: "This important act was signed by 8,000 or 10,000 people and was printed at the National Printing Office, located in the Old Jail."

== Drafting ==
In its drafting, many patriots gathered at the home of Antonia Batista. Archambault does not specify the exact number, but he does mention eighteen by name, among them included Benigno Filomeno de Rojas, Ulises Francisco Espaillat, Pedro Francisco Bonó, Máximo Grullón, and Matías Ramón Mella. Archambault, however, does not mention the main restoration figures as present at Batista's house, but they do head the document with their signatures: Gaspar Polanco, Gregorio Luperón, Benito Monción, Belisario Curiel.

"By unanimous agreement, the opinion of the enlightened initiator of the restoration movement, Colonel Santiago Rodríguez, at that time head of the Sabaneta community, was accepted, and the distinguished General Don José Antonio Salcedo, who was at that time Deputy Leader of the Revolution, was proclaimed President of the Provisional Government."

Filomeno de Rojas was appointed Vice President, and Mr. Ulises Francisco Espaillat, Máximo Grullón, Pablo Pujol, Pedro Fco. Bono, Alfredo Deetjen, Sebastián Valverde, and Belisario Curiel were appointed Ministers. The minutes were certified by Francisco Dubreil, Chief Officer of the Foreign Relations Commission.

The aforementioned Act denounced the prejudices of the Annexation and declared war on Spain. Furthermore, "the Annexation was not the work of our own free will, but the false desire of General Santana and his henchmen." There was no such spontaneity, but coercion, "now moral, now physical, from our oppressor...", that is, from General Pedro Santana, the traitor to the Homeland.

== The Act in Spanish ==
ACTA DE INDEPENDENCIA

Nosotros, los habitantes de la parte española de la isla de Santo Domingo, manifestamos por medio de la presente Acta de Independencia, ante Dios, al mundo entero y al trono de España, los justos y legales motivos que nos han obligado a tomar las armas para restaurar la República Dominicana y reconquistar nuestra libertad, el primero, el más precioso de los derechos con que el hombre fue favorecido por el Supremo Hacedor del Universo, justificando así nuestra conducta y nuestro imprescindible proceder, toda vez que otros medios suaves y persuasivos, uno de ellos muy elocuente, nuestro descontento, empleados oportunamente, no han sido bastante para persuadir al trono de Castilla; de que nuestra anexión a la Corona no fue obra de nuestra espontánea voluntad, sino el querer de Pedro Santana y de sus secuaces, quienes, en la desesperación de su indefectible afán por el poder, tomaron el desesperado partido de entregar la República, obra de grandes y cruentos sacrificios, bajo el pretexto de anexarnos al poder de España, permitiendo que descendiera el pabellón cruzado, enarbolado a costa de sangre del pueblo dominicano y con mil patos de triste recuerdo. Por más magnánimas que hayan sido las intenciones y acogidas del S. M. la Reina Doña Isabel II (q. D. g.) respecto al pueblo dominicano, al atravesar el Atlántico para ser ejecutadas por sus mandatarios subalternos, se han transformado en medidas bárbaras y tiránicas que este pueblo no ha podido ni debido sufrir. Para así probarlo, basta decir que hemos sido gobernados por un Buceta y un Campillo, cuyos hechos son bien notorios.

La anexión de la República Dominicana a la Corona de España ha sido la voluntad de un solo hombre que la ha dominado; nuestros más sagrados derechos, conquistados con dieciocho años de inmensos sacrificios, han sido traicionados y vendidos; el gabinete de la nación española ha sido engañado, y engañados también muchos de los dominicanos de valía influencia con promesas que no han sido cumplidas, con ofertas luego desmentidas. Pronunciamientos, manifestaciones de los pueblos, arrancadas por la coacción, ora moral, ora física, de nuestro opresor y los esbirros que lo rodeaban, remitidas al gobierno español, les hicieron creer falsamente nuestra espontaneidad para anexarnos; sin embargo, muy en breve, convencidos los pueblos del engaño y la perfidia, levantaron sus cabezas y comenzaron a hacer esfuerzos gloriosos, aunque por desgracia inútiles, al volver de la sorpresa que les produjo tan monstruoso hecho, para recobrar su independencia perdida, su libertad anonadada. Diganlo si no las víctimas de Moca, San Juan, Las Matas, el Cerdo, Santiago, Guayubín, Monte Cristi, Sabaneta y Puerto Plata. ¿Y cómo ha ejercido España el dominio que indebidamente adquirió sobre unos pueblos libres? La opresión de todo género, las restricciones y la exacción de contribuciones desconocidas e inmerecidas, fueron muy luego puestas en ejercicio. ¿Ha observado, por ventura, con un pueblo que de mal grado se había sometido, las leyes de los países cultos y civilizados, guardando y respetando, cual debía, las conveniencias, las costumbres, el carácter y los derechos naturales de todo hombre en sociedad? Lejos de eso, los hábitos, las costumbres de un pueblo libre por muchos años han sido contrariadas impolíticamente, no con aquella luz vivificadora que ilumina, sino con un fuego quemante y de exterminio. Escarnio, desprecio, marcada arrogancia, persecuciones y patíbulos inmerecidos y escandalosos son los únicos resultados que hemos obtenido, como sujetos de los subalternos del trono español a cuyas manos se confió nuestra suerte. El incendio, la devastación de nuestras poblaciones, las esposas sin sus esposos, los hijos sin sus padres, la pérdida de todos nuestros intereses y la miseria, en fin, he aquí los gajes que hemos obtenido de nuestra forzada y falaz anexión al trono español. Todo lo hemos perdido, pero nos queda nuestra independencia y libertad, por las cuales estamos dispuestos a derramar nuestra última gota de sangre. Si el gobierno español es político, si consulta sus intereses y también los nuestros, debe persuadirse de que a un pueblo que por algún tiempo ha gozado de su libertad, no es posible sojuzgarlo sin el exterminio del último de sus hombres.

De ello debe persuadirse la Augusta Soberana Doña Isabel II, cuya noble alma conocemos, y cuyos sentimientos filantrópicos confesamos y respetamos; pero S. M. ha sido engañada por la perfidia de quien fue nuestro presidente, el general Pedro Santana, y los de sus secuaces; y lo que ha tenido un origen vicioso, no puede ser válido por el transcurso del tiempo. He aquí las razones leales y los muy justos motivos que nos han obligado a tomar las armas y a defendernos, como lo haremos siempre, de la dominación que nos oprime y que viola nuestros sacrosantos derechos, así como de leyes opresoras que no han debido imponernos. El gobierno español deberá conocerlas también, respetarlas y obrar en consecuencia

Santiago, 14 de septiembre de 1863.

Firmados: Benigno F. de Rojas, Gaspar Polanco, A. Deetjen, Pablo Pujol, José A. Salcedo, Benito Monción, Manuel Rodríguez, Pedro A. Pimentel, Juan A. Polanco, Gregorio Luperón, Genaro Perpiñán, Pedro Francisco Bono, Máximo Grullón, J. Belisario Curiel, R. Curiel, H. S. Riolbe, Esteban Almanzar, Ulises F. Espaillat, C. Castellanos, Juan Valentín Curiel, F. Scheffem-Ihr, Juan A. Vila, F. A. Bordas, J. Jiménez, A. Benes, Ramón Almonte, Manuel Ponce de León, F. Casado, J. E. Márquez, J. Alva, Dionisio Troncoso, R. Martínez, Pbro. Miguel Quezada, L. Perello, R. Velázquez, P. Pimentel, Gabino Crespo, J. A. Sánchez, M. de J. Jiménez, Rufino García, Juan Riva.

Es copia conforme.- El oficial mayor de la comisión de Relaciones Exteriores, Francisco Du Breil.

== The Act in English ==
ACT OF INDEPENDENCE

We, the inhabitants of the Spanish part of the island of Santo Domingo, hereby declare through this Act of Independence, before God, to the entire world, and to the throne of Spain, the just and legal motives that have forced us to take up arms in order to restore the Dominican Republic and reclaim our freedom—the first and most precious of the rights bestowed upon man by the Supreme Creator of the Universe—thus justifying our actions and our necessary fight. This course was chosen after other peaceful and persuasive means, one of them eloquent, to express our dissatisfaction and which had been employed in a timely manner, failed to convince the throne of Castile. Our annexation to the Crown was not the result of our spontaneous will but rather the coerced desire of General Pedro Santana and his followers, who, in their desperation to cling to power, resorted to the extreme measure of delivering the Republic—created through great and bloody sacrifices—under the pretext of annexation to Spain, allowing the cross of the kingdom to be raised at the cost of the Dominican people's blood and with painful memories.

Despite the magnanimous intentions and actions of Her Majesty Queen Isabella II (may God Save Her) toward the Dominican people, when these were carried across the Atlantic to be executed by her subordinate authorities, they transformed into barbaric and tyrannical measures that this people could neither suffer nor tolerate. To prove this, it suffices to state that we have been governed by a Buceta and a Campillo, whose actions are well known. The annexation of the Dominican Republic to the Spanish Crown was the will of a single man who dominated it; our most sacred rights, conquered through eighteen years of immense sacrifices, have been betrayed and sold. The Spanish government's cabinet has been deceived, and many Dominicans of significant influence have also been misled with promises that were never fulfilled, with offers later contradicted.

Pronouncements and manifestations from the towns, extracted by coercion—whether moral or physical—by our oppressors and their minions, sent to the Spanish government, falsely led them to believe our willingness to annex ourselves. However, very soon, the people realized the deception and perfidy, raised their heads, and began to make glorious efforts, though unfortunately futile, to recover their lost independence and shattered freedom. Let us speak of the victims of Moca, San Juan, Las Matas, El Cerdo, Santiago, Guayubín, Monte Cristi, Sabaneta, and Puerto Plata, and ask: how has Spain exercised the dominion it unlawfully acquired over free people? The oppression of all kinds, restrictions, and the imposition of unknown and undeserved taxes were soon put into practice.

Has Spain observed, toward a people it had reluctantly subjugated, the laws of cultured and civilized countries, respecting the conveniences, customs, character, and natural rights of every man in society? Far from it, the habits and customs of a free people for many years have been countered impolitically, not with the enlightening light that guides, but with a burning fire of extermination. Scorn, contempt, marked arrogance, persecutions, and undeserved, scandalous executions have been the only results we've gained from the subalterns of the Spanish throne to whom our fate was entrusted. The fire, the devastation of our towns, wives without their husbands, children without their parents, the loss of all our interests, and misery—these are the results of our forced and false annexation to the Spanish throne. We have lost everything, but we still have our Independence and Liberty, for which we are willing to shed our last drop of blood.

If the Spanish government is political, if it consults its interests, and also ours, it must understand that a people who have enjoyed their liberty for a time cannot be subjugated without the extermination of their last man. This must be understood by the noble Sovereign Queen Isabella II, whose noble soul we know, and whose philanthropic sentiments we acknowledge and respect. But Her Majesty has been deceived by the perfidy of our former president, General Pedro Santana, and his followers. What has had a vicious origin cannot be validated by the passage of time. These are the loyal and just reasons that have forced us to take up arms and defend ourselves, as we always will, from the domination that oppresses us and violates our sacred rights, as well as from oppressive laws that should never have been imposed upon us. The Spanish government must also know, respect, and act accordingly.

Santiago, September 14, 1863.

Signed: Benigno F. de Rojas, Gaspar Polanco, A. Deetjen, Pablo Pujol, José A. Salcedo, Benito Monción, Manuel Rodríguez, Pedro A. Pimentel, Juan A. Polanco, Gregorio Luperón, Genaro Perpiñán, Pedro Francisco Bono, Máximo Grullón, J. Belisario Curiel, R. Curiel, H. S. Riolbe, Esteban Almanzar, Ulises F. Espaillat, C. Castellanos, Juan Valentín Curiel, F. Scheffem-lhr, Juan A. Vila, F. A. Bordas, J. Jiménez, A. Benes, Ramón Almonte, Manuel Ponce de León, F. Casado, J. E. Márquez, J. Alva, Dionisio Troncoso, R. Martínez, Pbro. Miguel Quezada, L. Perrello, R. Velázquez, P. Pimentel, Gabino Crespo, J. A. Sánchez, M. de J. Jiménez, Rufino García, Juan Riva.

Certified copy. The chief officer of the Foreign Relations commission, Francisco Du Breil.

== See also ==
- Dominican Restoration War
- Treaty of El Carmelo
- Second Dominican Republic
- Dominican Act of Independence (1844)

== Sources ==
- https://catalogo.academiadominicanahistoria.org.do/opac-tmpl/files/ppcodice/Clio-1942-010-054-098-099.pdf
- https://vanguardiadelpueblo.do/1863/09/14/declaran-restaurada-la-independencia-de-la-republica-dominicana/#:~:text=Declaran%20restaurada%20la%20Independencia%20de%20la%20Rep%C3%BAblica%20Dominicana&text=SANTIAGO%20DE%20LOS%20CABALLEROS%2C%20el,Independencia%20de%20la%20Rep%C3%BAblica%20Dominicana.
