= Benito Martínez (militant) =

Dominican soldier

- Born: Spanish
- Occupation: General
- Known for: Dominican Restoration War

Benito Martínez was a Dominican military commander who was a leader in the Dominican Restoration War. Due to his death in combat, he was a Martyr in the Dominican Republic.

== Early life ==
A native of Puerto Plata he was a Farmer, owner of large tracts of land on the slopes of the Isabel de Torres hill. He was a veteran of the Dominican War of Independence; He had the rank of general and was enrolled in the Reserves when the annexation by Spain was imposed.

== War of Restoration ==
He continued to serve the Spanish even after beginning the war. The column to which Martínez belonged was commanded by the Spanish general Rafael Primo de Rivera. It was concentrated in the San Felipe Fortress and on the October 3, 1863, he left the premises with permission from his superiors.

He went over to the side of the patriots and continued the fight on the outskirts of the city. Provisionally superior chief of all the cantons and finally commander of the Cafemba camp. He had two artillery pieces and with them he frequently cannonaded the Spanish boats. In January 1864, he was the Chief of Operations of the Las Jabillas camp.

== Death ==
In the early morning of the 30th to the 31st August 1864, the Spanish launched a violent assault with a force of two thousand men about the positions of the patriots; The trench defended by Martínez was overwhelmed by the attack of that superior force. The order came to undertake the withdrawal. “And to whom do I leave this cannon?” The brave general asked gallantly, when his comrades-in-arms advised him to retreat. He was left accompanied by only seven men and without taking a single step back, he continued fighting desperately while he had a breath of life left. He fought to the death and died in battle. General José de la Gándara, in the report sent to the Governor of Cuba, dated of September 3, 1864:

Bowed before the heroism of General Martínez: He was bizarrely killed at his post, at the time of firing the last cannon shot, pierced by the bayonets of two Crown hunters.

Another Spanish historian, Ramón González Tablas, pays unconscious tribute to the steely courage of the fallen general. He died, says the chronicler, at the foot of the canyon and with the wick in hand. The combat took place at night, and when daylight arrived, the Spanish troops came across the lifeless body of General Benito Martínez and, without the slightest hint of dignity and honor, they stooped to the point of attacking the corpse and burned it.

== See also ==
- Dominican Restoration War
- José de la Gándera
