= Matías Ramón Mella =

Dominican revolutionary; 7th Vice President of the Dominican Republic from 1863–1864

His Excellency Matías Ramón Mella
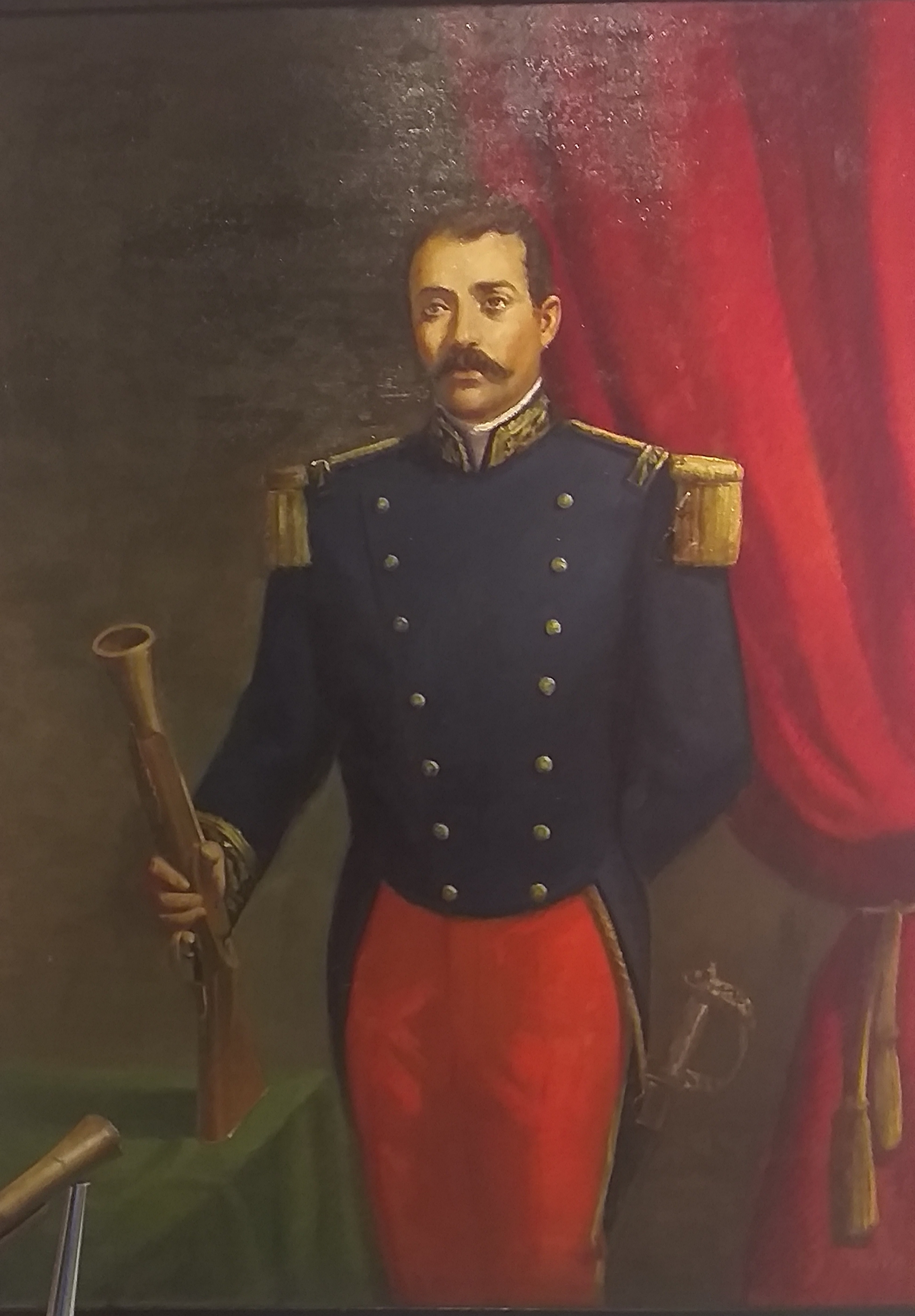
- Portrait of Mella, in his military uniform, holding a blunderbuss, c. 1840s–1850s

7th Vice President of the Dominican Republic
- In office September 14, 1863 – June 4, 1864
- President: José Antonio Salcedo
- Preceded by: Benigno Filomeno de Rojas
- Succeeded by: Ulises Francisco Espaillat

4th Minister of Finance of the Dominican Republic
- In office September 26, 1849 – April 8, 1850
- President: Buenaventura Báez
- Preceded by: Jacinto de la Concha
- Succeeded by: Manuel Joaquín del Monte

Personal details
- Born: February 25, 1816 Santo Domingo, Captaincy General of Santo Domingo (now Dominican Republic)
- Died: June 4, 1864 (aged 48) Santiago, Spanish province of Santo Domingo
- Resting place: Altar de la Patria
- Party: Central Government Board
- Other political affiliations: La Trinitaria
- Spouse: Josefa Brea (m. 1836)
- Relations: Julio Antonio Mella (grandson)
- Children: Ramón María, Dominga América María, Antonio Nicanor, Ildefonso
- Parent(s): Antonio Mella Álvarez and Francisca Javier Castillo Álvarez
- Occupation: Businessman, politician, diplomat, independence leader
- Profession: Minister of Finance of the Dominican Republic (1849 – 1850) Minister of War (1861 – 1864) Vice President of the Dominican Republic (1863 – 1864)
- Known for: Firing the blunderbuss shot of February 27, 1844; Author of the Guerrilla Warfare Manuel (1864)
- Awards: National hero
- Nickname: Ramón

Military service
- Allegiance: Dominican Republic
- Branch/service: (Haiti) Haitian Army: 31st and 32nd Regiment; Dominican Army: Liberation Army; Restoration Army
- Years of service: 1838–1864
- Rank: General
- Battles/wars: Reform Revolution; Dominican War of Independence; Cibaeño Revolution; Dominican Restoration War
- Honors: Order of Merit of Duarte, Sánchez and Mella

Matías Ramón Mella Castillo (25 February, 1816 – 4 June, 1864), known as Ramón Mella, was a Dominican revolutionary, politician, and military general during the Dominican War of Independence. He is known for being one of the three principal leaders of the independence movement, together with Juan Pablo Duarte and Francisco del Rosario Sánchez, and is one of the founding figures of the Dominican Republic.

Mella was a member of La Trinitaria, a secret society founded in 1838 to organize resistance to Haitian rule in the eastern part of Hispaniola. On February 27th, 1844, he fired a blunderbuss at the Puerta de la Misericordia in Santo Domingo, an act traditionally associated with starting the uprising that led to the proclamation of the First Dominican Republic.

Following independence, Mella held a number of political and military posts in the new Dominican state. During the Dominican Restoration War (1863–1865), which sought to end the Spanish annexation of the country, he supported the restorationist movement and is credited with preparing a manual on guerrilla warfare used in organizing Dominican forces. Mella died in Santiago de los Caballeros on the 4th of June, 1864 during the course of the restoration conflict, a year before Dominican independence was re-established in 1865.

== Early life and education ==
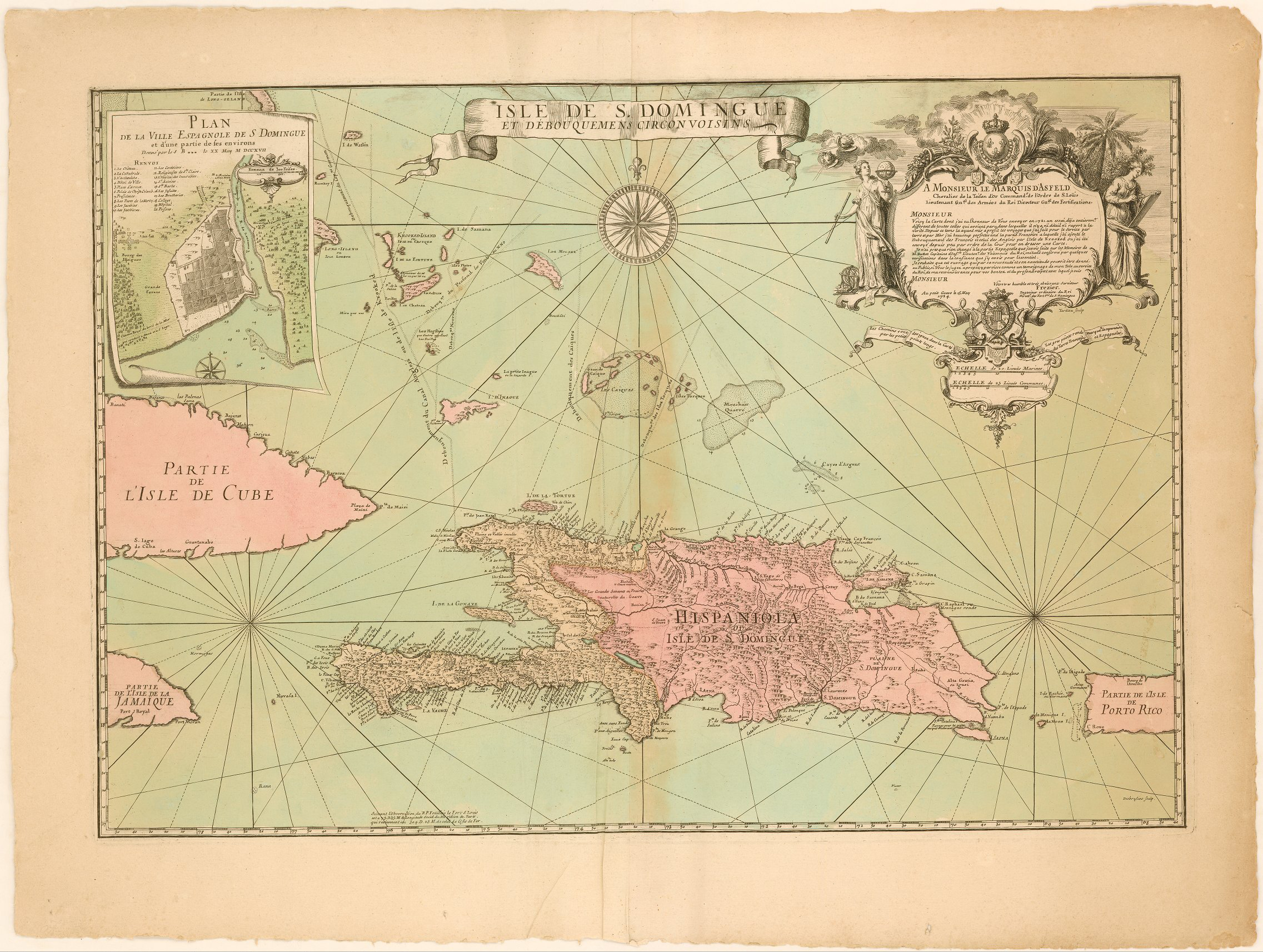
Frezier Map of Hispaniola

Mella was born in Santo Domingo on the February 25th, 1816, during the España Boba. His parents, Antonio and Francisca, were of Spanish descent. His father worked as a merchant. His paternal grandmother, Juana Álvarez Pereyra, was a native of San Carlos but had origins in the Canary Islands.

At 11 days old, Mella was baptized into the Catholic faith at Santo Domingo Cathedral on March 6th, 1816.

During his youth, Mella witnessed the Dominican independence leader, José Núñez de Cáceres, successfully overthrow Spanish rule. This resulted in the declaration of independence for the Republic of Spanish Haiti on December 1st, 1821.

Little is documented about Mella's education, but due to the scarcity of public schools during his childhood and his family's economic position, it is likely that his parents sourced his education privately from respected Dominican educators. Mella is said to have displayed skill with a sword and sabre from a very young age. He engaged in military service, and was reportedly involved in the dispersal of groups of armed Haitians attempting to disrupt local gatherings. At 19 years old, he began working as a precious wood cutter in San Cristóbal, which he continued for several years.

Mella had two siblings—Ildefonso and Manuela. Ildefonso also played a key role in Dominican independence, known as one of the first to protest the annexation to Spain. Before his exile to Cuba, Ildefonso rode through Puerto Plata with a Dominican flag, reportedly declaring, "Long live the Dominican flag, regardless of which it may be".

Mella became a Freemason at the age of 21.

In August 1836, Mella married Josefa Brea. Together, they had four children, including Ramón María, and Antonio Nicanor.

== Confusion about his name ==
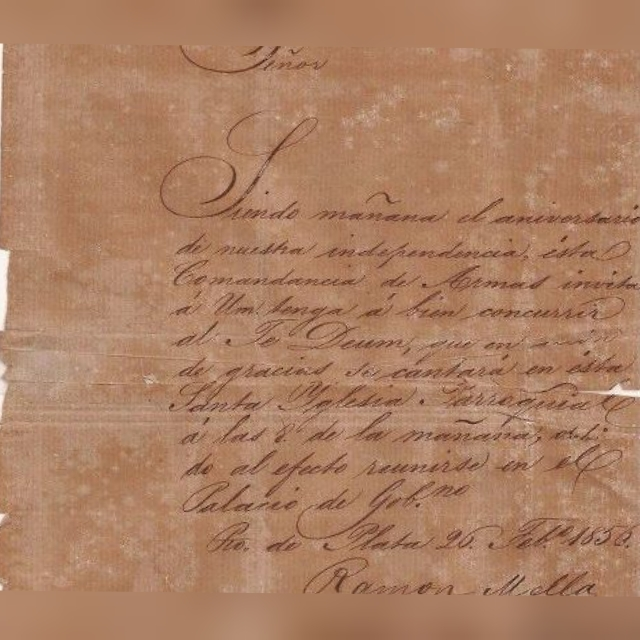
Unpublished document, written in Mella's handwriting, signed as Ramón Mella.

Mella's true name has been a major debate among historians. Most official documents from the time of the restoration government (his baptism and marriage certificate, will, appointment to the role of Minister of War) state his name as Ramón Mella Castillo, aside from a few documents that he signed as M. Mella and M. Ramón Mella. There is little evidence that his name was Matías Ramón Mella.

For example, Mella's baptismal certificate, signed by the parish priest Agustín Tavares, reads as follows:

"I, the undersigned Lieutenant Priest of this Holy Church of the Cathedral, solemnly baptized I put oil and chrisma on Ramón, eleven days old, the legitimate son of Antonio de Mella and Francisca Castillo."

On August 30, 1836, he was married and the marriage documentation referred to him as “Ramón Mella, a native of this city, of older age.”

Historian Alcides García Lluberes maintains that Mella was born around midnight between February 24 and 25, 1816, because his middle name, Matías, corresponds to the Saint of the day, February 24. Before independence, however, there are documents in Mella signed as MR Mella, as recorded in the Manifestation of January 16, 1844, and in a communication of February 28 that the Central Government Board addressed to the French Consul Saint Denys. However, his friends and co-religionists of the Trinitarios did not call him Matías. In a letter dated November 15, 1843, written in correspondence between his peers, it was written: “Ramón Mella is preparing to go there”.

The generality of the official and private documents consulted indicates that, during his public life, Mella never signed Matías Ramón, but instead Ramón Mella, R. Mella or simply Mella. In his Will, made and signed on May 5, 1859, the following is recorded: “Before me, José Leandro García, Public Notary of the residence of Puerto Plata, signed below. Don Ramón Mella,”. At the end of the aforementioned will, he signed: R. Mella; the signature with which he also endorsed a patriotic Proclamation addressed “To my fellow citizens", on 16 January 1864. During the restoration war, several official documents show that the Minister of War and also General in Chief of the Armies of the South was Ramón Mella, a name that appears in various decrees issued by the restoration government. On March 17, 1864, with his health already very deteriorated, Mella was elected vice president of the restoration government. Additionally, in the Book of Minutes of the Sessions of the Supreme Government of the Republic, it states that "by secret scrutiny, and the vote was collected, the honorable General Ramón Mella was unanimously elected". Immediately afterwards, the Government ordered that "it be duly communicated to Mr. General Ramón Mella the election that has been made in his person for vice president".

In various letters that he shared with his relatives and collaborators of the independence cause, they never referred to him as Matías and in fact, they did not mention his middle name, so it is not known how or why in some history texts their first names have been exchanged. Because of this, this has led to historical confusion about his name. But in most cases, he is referred to as Matías Ramón Mella.

== Revolutionary leader ==
=== First activities under Duarte ===
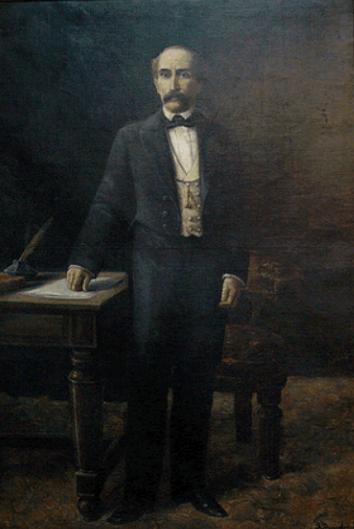
Juan Pablo Duarte

In 1838, Mella joined La Trinitaria, a secret society founded by Juan Pablo Duarte to establish a nation independent from Haitian rule. The movement was influenced by nationalist and liberal ideologies seeking sovereignty for the eastern part of the island. Although Mella may not have been present for the initial oath on July 16, 1838, Duarte recognized him as a founding member. Over the following five years, the Trinitarios promoted independence through public-facing front organizations, La Filantrópica and La Dramática, to avoid detection by Haitian authorities. During this period, Mella became a prominent figure within the movement and a close collaborator of Duarte.

Duarte, along with his companions, worked to convince many Dominicans that independence was achievable. In the early 1830s, a liberal opposition emerged in the Haitian Chamber of Deputies against Boyer. Almost all the delegates from the Department of the South were part of this opposition, which had as its social base a segment of the same ruling mulatto sector. Boyer proceeded to dismiss some of the elected liberals, mainly Hérard Dumesle and David Saint Preux, who claimed his government adopted a dictatorial style of leadership. The liberal leaders resorted to conspiracy to overthrow Boyer. Aware of the plans of the Haitian liberals and strategizing about what the process of preparing the conditions for Dominican independence should be, Duarte decided to establish an alliance with them. Duarte calculated that the fall of the Boyer regime would lead to a worsening of the conflicts within Haiti and weaken their power.

Duarte saw Mella suited for leadership roles. After Juan Nepomuceno Ravelo's unsuccessful mission to establish an alliance with Haitian liberals, Duarte tasked Mella with traveling to the Haitian village of Les Cayes in January 1843. Mella's mission was to seek support for a reform movement to challenge Boyer's regime. There, Mella stayed at the house of Jérôme-Maximilien Borgella, a Haitian general and politician, who was also a former governor of Santo Domingo. Meanwhile, Boyer's popularity continued to wane because of the excessive rise of taxes, the benefits of which did not revert to the population, but to France, who demanded compensation from Boyer given the loss of property property, including Haitian slaves, that the country incurred over the course of the Haitian Revolution.

Groups opposed to the Boyer regime arose in Haiti itself; the island had become increasingly frustrated with his repressive dictatorship, combined with his negligent response following a sudden earthquake that had struck Haiti a year prior, a situation which Duarte believed he could use to the advantage of the independence movement.

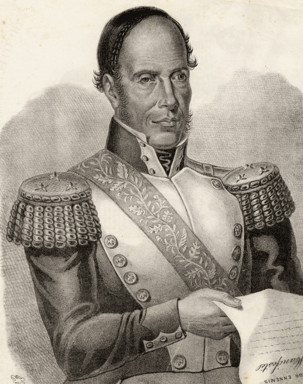
Charles Rivière-Herard

Subsequently, Mella came into contact with the Haitian opposition leader Charles Rivière-Hérard, who in turn led the reform movement, which came to be known as the Reform Revolution, in March 1843. It took Mella several days to reach an agreement with the revolutionaries that would place the Trinitarios at an advantageous position. In addition, Hérard was unaware that the Dominicans' true purpose was to prepare for the definitive separation of the Haitian government. On March 24, Mella, along with Perez and Pedro Alejandro Pina met at Plaza del Carmen to proclaim the Dominican adherence to the Reform movement. After a month and a half of military operations in the southern peninsula of Haiti, Boyer's troops were defeated, causing Boyer to flee the island, bringing an end to his regime.

In Santo Domingo, the Trinitarios and Haitian liberals waited for news of Boyer's resignation before launching an uprising in favor of La Reforma; other groups, by contrast, had already taken to the streets when news of events in Port-au-Prince broke. The Trinitarios nonetheless placed themselves at the forefront of the demonstrations. Mella, along with Duarte, was among the members of the Popular Board of Santo Domingo, a local authority in which Trinitarios and Haitian liberals coexisted. Relations between the two factions quickly deteriorated. The Trinitarios began campaigning for independence and won the local elections in Santo Domingo on June 15. The break between Haitian liberals (reformists) and Dominican liberals (Trinitarios) was now complete.

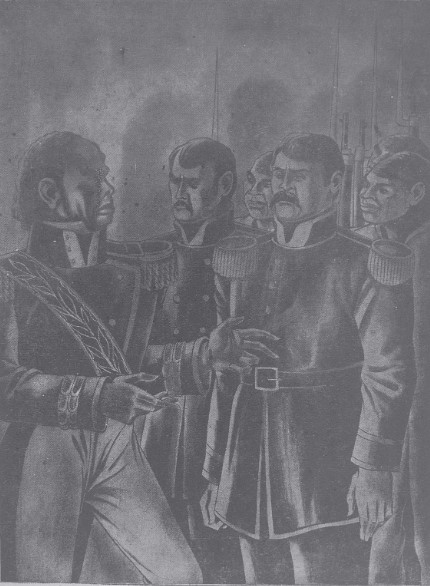
Illustration of the arrest of Mella and Francisco Antonio Salcedo.

In July 1843, Mella departed from Les Cayes and moved to Central Cibao to continue promoting his republican ideals for independence. However, Hérard, who was now the president of Haiti, learned of the true motives of Mella and his companions, and traveled to the eastern part of the island to arrest them.

He would imprison Mella, (who was arrested in San Francisco de Macorís), in Port-au-Prince, where he remained for two months. However, a rebellion erupted against Hérard, who was only able to dominate with the help of Mella and the incarcerated veterans whom he freed. Hérard mistakenly believed that Dominican insurrection attempts had ceased, and that they lacked sufficient power to achieve independence due to the pronounced poverty and sparse population of the eastern part of the island. (Haiti had approximately 800,000 inhabitants, compared to Santo Domingo's 135,000).

=== Manifesto of January 16, 1844 ===
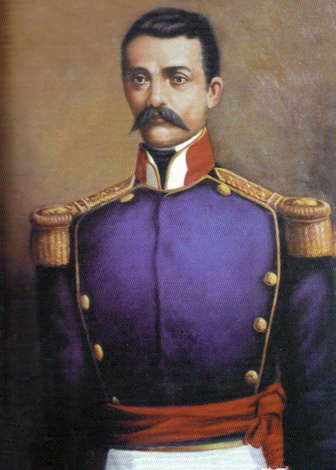
Portrait of Mella

As Civil unrest continued to erupt in Haiti, Mella used the opportunity to return to Santo Domingo to proceed to the next phase of independence. But by now, Duarte was not present due to his voluntary exile when learning of the persecution that would be carried out against him by the Haitians. This left the Trinitarios without their leader. In agreement with Vicente Celestino Duarte, Tomas de la Concha, Jacinto de la Concha, Gabino Puello, and José Joaquín Puello, they were left to lead the revolution and declare independence. It was agreed then that the date of which the Declaration of Independence awould be February 27, 1844.

However, following the Reform movement, the political situation of the eastern portion of the island became increasingly volatile. According to historian José Gabriel García, clashes between the Trinitarios and various groups (pro-French and pro-Spanish separatists) disputed the leadership of the revolutionary movement and the government that was emerging.

Mella restarted his work in favor of independence. Documents indicate, he considered advocacy for an alliance with the conservatives to be of the most immediate importance. Taking stock of the raid carried out by Hérard, he came to the conclusion that the liberal sector lacked the necessary strength to overthrow Haitian rule on its own. Initially, Francisco del Rosario Sánchez, who had been in charge of the Trinitarios after Duarte's departure, opposed this approach, trying to have the declaration of independence made by the Trinitarios separately. Eventually he was convinced of the relevance of the alliance, and resumed collaboration with Mella. The latter had established relations with Tomás Bobadilla, since neither of the two parties had the capacity to promote independence without the help of the other. Mella's impact on the agreement between liberals and conservatives was part of the inspiration for the Manifesto of January 16, 1844, a document that laid out the reasons for Dominican independence. The content of the document was first discussed between Sánchez and Mella, who then presented it to Bobadilla, so that he could introduce corrections and extensions, in recognition of his experience and intellectual capacity and because he acted as the representative of the higher social sectors.

== Dominican Declaration of Independence ==
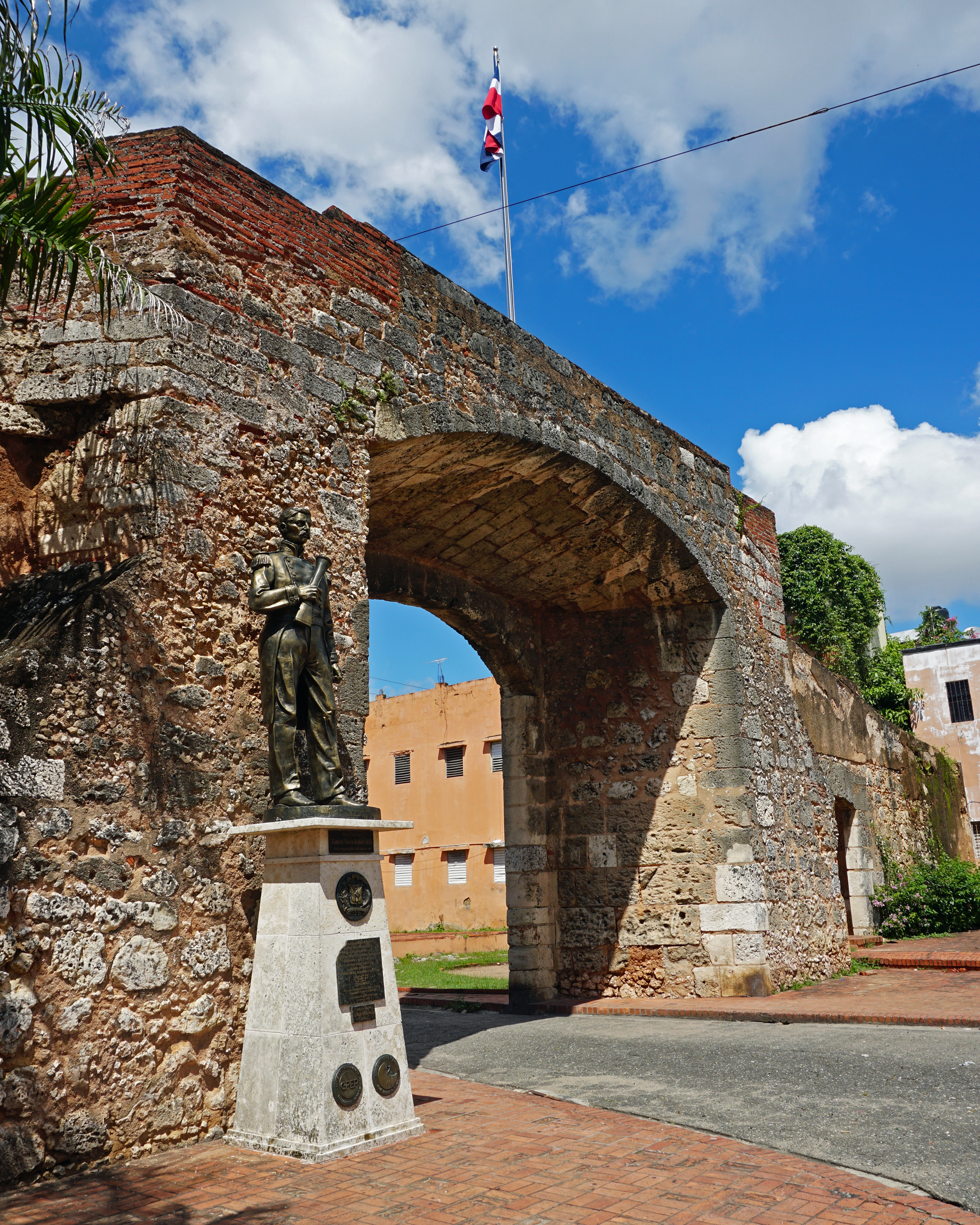
Puerta del Conde, the location of the legendary "blunderbuss" shot of Matías Ramón Mella.

Sources vary on how the events of the "blunderbuss" shot transpired. It is said that on the night of February 27, 1844, when the revolutionaries met at the designated meeting spot, they realized that the turnout was much smaller than expected due to the Haitian authorities being alerted, who, responding to the conspiracy, deployed a military operation in key parts of the city. Faced with this situation, one of those present suggested postponing these plans until further favorable circumstances. Mella, however, objected to the proposal and declared the impossibility of turning back. He then fired his blunderbuss shot into the air to end the hesitation. A testimony, written by Eustache Juchereau de Saint Denys, a member of the French consul in Santo Domingo, who had heard the famous blunderbuss, writes:

The night of the 27th was the day set for that attempt. The authority was on guard, the general restlessness, it was hoped, however, that the order would not be disturbed. The Vicar General, the most influential people in the city made useless efforts to bring more reasonable sentiments to that youth. They were unbreakable, and as they announced, the signal was given at 11 at night by a rifle shot fired into the air.

José María Serra de Castro, one of the founders of La Trinitaria, who was an author of one of the main historical sources of the 1844 revolution, wrote that once Duartistas and Febreristas met at La Misercordia, they found that the number of attendees was less than expected. He explains:

"The situation is compromised," said Mella. "Let's play everything for everything," and he fired his blunderbuss into the air.

However, Manuel de Jesús Galván, a politician and author, narrates those events in these terms:

The solemn hour arrived: a group of patriots anxiously awaited the defaulters in the secluded and lonely end of the city, called La Misericordia, at the foot of the Fort of San Gil. The exact ones to the appointment were counted with concern: the largest number of those committed to the company were missing. The conspirators always have to count these cowardly defections at the precise and critical moment of action. One of the faithful finally arrives, moved and painting: "I think everything is discovered," he says, "a patrol has chased me, and I've made a long detour to get here." These words spread suspicion among the few listeners; and someone full of fright talks about retiring home and giving up the glorious project: "NO," answers a robust and manly voice firmly, disturbing the nocturnal silence without any caution. "It is no longer given to back; Cowards as brave, we all have to go to the end. Long live the Dominican Republic!" He says, and a resounding detonation of the rock from him resoundingly accentuates the heroic cry. No one hesitates anymore: everyone makes a sacrifice of their lives and runs towards the classic Puerta del Conde. The bold shot made by the intrepid Ramón Mella announced to the world the birth of the Dominican Republic.

After this, the patriots marched toward the stronghold of San Gennaro (now Conde Gate), where another patrician, Francisco del Rosario Sánchez, proclaimed to the world the birth of the Dominican Republic.

== Independent Republic ==
=== Return to the Cibao ===
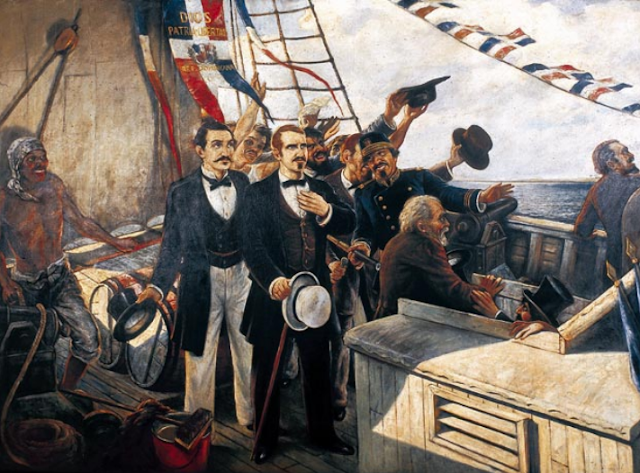
Duarte's return to the island

After the formation of the First Dominican Republic, Mella was appointed to the Central Government Board, with Sánchez serving as president. On March 2, 1844, Mella sent a letter to Duarte, Pérez, and Pina, all of whom were in Curaçao, informing them of the success of the revolt and of affairs of the new state. A few days later, Mella left for the Cibao in order to direct the defense against the Haitians and proceed to the organization of the new state in said region, the most important in the country at the time, given its wealth and population. With the rank of colonel and delegate of the board, Mella proposed to organize the defense around the city of Santiago, believing that the city would prove to be vital in the war. Mella was aware that if the city was captured, the road to the capital would be clear for the enemy troops. Upon reaching the city, he replaced the weapons commander. He then realized then the city lacked soldiers, so he left a command chart and a combat plan before marching towards San José de Las Matas, (then known as La Sierra), to recruit people. He also left the instruction to avoiding small conflicts against Haitian groups and to concentrate all resources to defend Santiago.

He used that time to enlist José María Imbert, from Moca, as second in command of the newly constituted National Army, which would later become the Liberation Army. Mella would also assume the position of governor of Santiago and delegate of the Central Government Board, acting as chief political and general for the army.

When leaving Santiago in the direction of La Sierra, Mella did not calculate the enemy's maneuverability. The governor of the Department of Northern Haiti, General Jean-Louis Pierrot, at the head of 10,000 men, was approaching Santiago by forced marches. Mella decided to return to Santo Domingo to warn his comrades, but not before giving instructions to Imbert, who was now the lieutenant, to combat the upcoming attack. The forecasts made by Mella and the competent leadership of Imbert resulted in a crushing defeat of the Haitians in the Battle of Santiago. The confusion for the Haitians was so great that Pierrot accepted a truce and decided to return to Cap-Haïtien when he was shown a flyer containing the false news that President Hérard had died in Azua. This withdrawal guaranteed the safety of the Cibao.

Over the next two months, Mella dedicated himself to consolidating the defense of the region and ordered the advance of Dominican troops to the border. As a representative of the liberal Trinitarios, Mella faced opposition from conservative sectors of the region, who obeyed the guidance of the majority of the Government Board. Despite this, Mella obtained broad support, which was a sign that liberal positions found greater acceptance in Cibao than in Santo Domingo. (The capital was the focus of the conservative group, as the residence of the leading sectors of the country. On the other hand, in the southern region, there were social relations that largely had their origin in colonial times, especially extensive livestock farming. On the other hand, in the surroundings of Santiago, tobacco production had been developing, allowing the emergence of a peasantry linked to the market and a more modern and dynamic urban middle class than that existing in Santo Domingo).

On one hand, in the South Band, there were social relations that largely had their origin in colonial times, especially extensive livestock farming. On the other hand, in the surroundings of Santiago, tobacco production had been developing, allowing the emergence of a peasantry linked to the market and a more modern and dynamic urban middle class than that existing in Santo Domingo.

=== Military coup of June 9, 1844 ===
Events took a different turn following the victory in the Battle of Azua. With Duarte's return to the country, Mella voted to elect him as president of the Central Government Board with the purpose of preventing another annexation by any foreign power. He would address this in a letter to Sánchez:

These towns had no more disturbances than the coming of the Delegation; This ended with the arrival of Juan Pablo, thank God! Finally, I conclude by telling you that my wish has arrived and I will return it, President of the Dominican Republic.

But by now, Sánchez was no longer in power. The board was under the presidency of Bobadilla, officialized through a letter on March 8, 1844, addressed to Auguste Levasseur, the French diplomat, a French protectorate, which evidently implied a return to the Levasseur Plan. Supposedly, Bobadilla, Sánchez, José María Caminero, and various other politicians had signed this letter. But Mella's signature does not appear on it: on that date, he was still active trip on his way to the Cibao.

After learning of Bobadilla's annexationist plans, Duarte decided to stage a military uprising to stop it. On June 9, 1844, representatives of the "protectionist" sector were toppled, and Sánchez was reinstated. Mella then concentrated his efforts on promoting a movement aimed at bringing Duarte to the Presidency of the Republic. The Trinitarios, who were now in control of the government, decided to send Duarte to the Cibao, in order to reinforce Mella's authority. In Santiago, troops gathered to celebrate Duarte as president of the Dominican Republic. Even though Mella may have promoted the pronouncement, Duarte was and still is largely considered the father of the country, and acted as an interpreter of popular sentiment.

=== Pedro Santana's counterstrike and exile ===
Meanwhile, Pedro Santana, backed by his troops and by the tacit alliance they had reached with the French Consul and the most prominent members of the colonialist group, headed towards the capital of the new State, with the purpose of assuming power. Juan Isidro Pérez and Pedro Alejandro Pina did everything possible to organize a solid defense in the city. Unfortunately, on July 12, 1844, Santana crossed the city walls, where he found no opposition, and the next day he carried out a coup d'état. When the changes that had occurred in Santo Domingo became known, Mella's position weakened. The Cibaeño conservatives intensified the conspiracy and the liberals found themselves unable to confront the implementation of the Santana dictatorship. Mella managed to maintain the fidelity of the main authorities, but his situation became increasingly unstable.

Despite its economic and demographic weight, the Cibao region lacked power mechanisms, especially in the military aspect, as there were no command systems that could compete with those of Santo Domingo. A considerable part of its leaders, although they were not supporters of Santana and the conservatives. came to the conclusion that it was impossible to oppose them because it introduced the risk of a civil war, in which they would probably be defeated and open the doors upon the return of the Haitians. The fear of the Cibaeño leaders of civil war, which led them to lean towards an agreement with the authority established in Santo Domingo, meant the defeat of the region against the centralism of Santo Domingo, which would be reiterated on subsequent occasions.

Immediately, the Trinitarios were persecuted: Duarte and Mella were both imprisoned in Puerto Plata. The hostility towards Mella was led by General Francisco Antonio Salcedo, but other figures with a hesitant stance, such as General Antonio López Villanueva, decided to join the conservative Board. That same day, the new government issued the resolution that condemned them to permanent exile. While in exile, Mella chose to settle in Puerto Rico.

=== Return to Dominican Republic ===
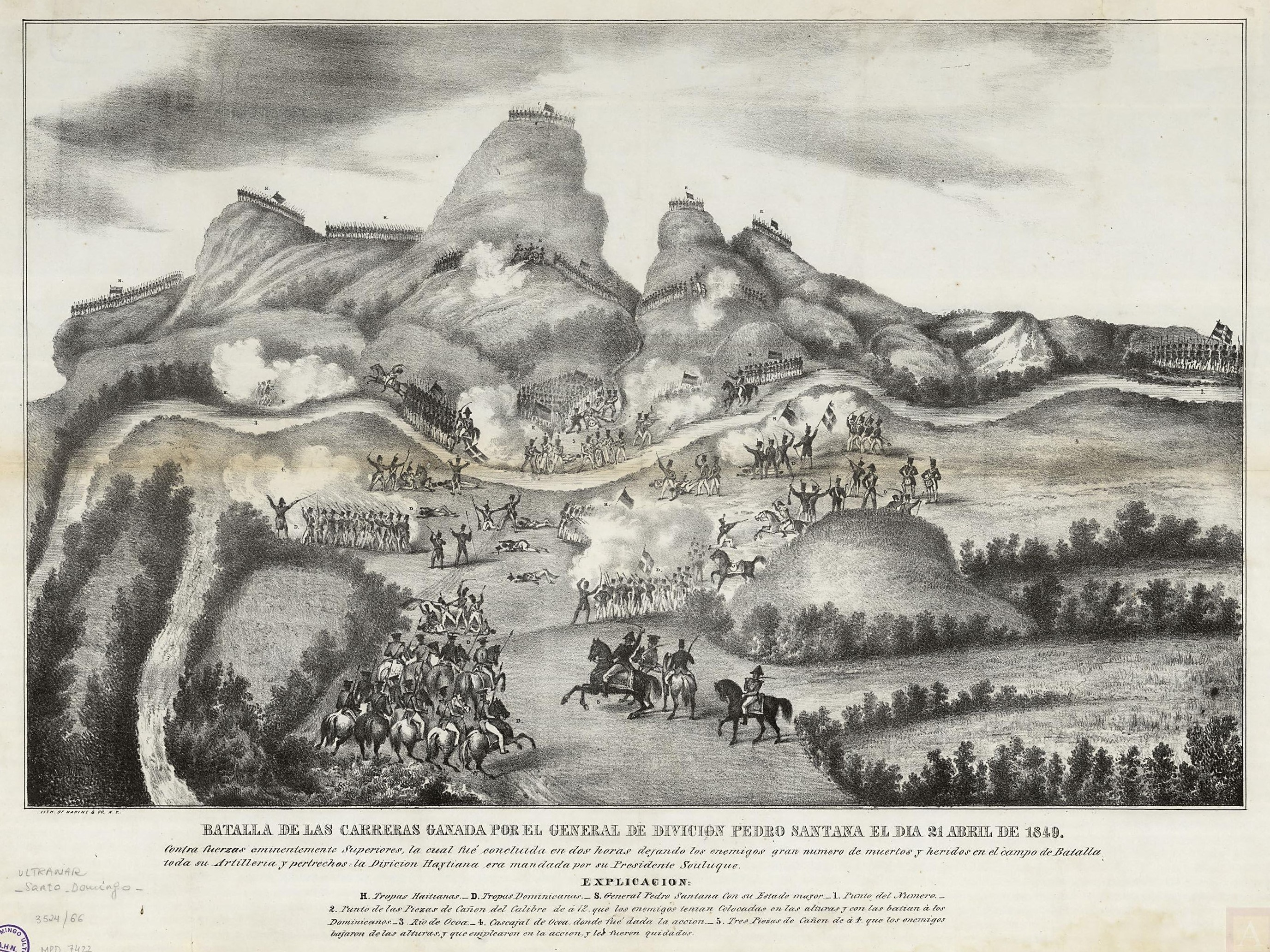
Mella returned to the island just in time to take part in the Battle of Las Carreras, fought in April 1849.

Eventually, in 1848, Mella, along with Sánchez, was granted amnesty by president Manuel Jimenes to return to the country. A few weeks after arriving in the country, to organize a movement against Jiménes administration, but gave after encountering the opposition of Pina, Sánchez, and Juan Evangelista Jiménez, who had also returned to the homeland protected by the amnesty decree. He then resettled in Puerto Plata, working in the woodcuts, away from political affairs.

However, in March 1849, Haitian President Faustin Soulouque issued the third campaign against the Dominican Republic. Mella, having rejoined the ranks of the army, commanded a battalion sent to the border to confront incoming troops. Forced to retreat to Azua, he advised Antonio Duvergé to continue the retreat towards Baní. Two weeks later, Santana took over the leadership of the army by Congress. Mella took part in the Battle of Las Carreras, in one of the main command positions. He was said to have occupied Palmar de Ocoa to repel the attack of the invading Haitian army, securing Dominican victory.

After delivering the famous defeat to the Haitian troops, Santana ignored the Jiménez government. Mella became linked to Santana, who appointed him his private secretary. Like Sánchez, Mella saw that there was no possibility of reconstituting a liberal grouping, he believed it was necessary to integrate into current politics. While Sánchez associated with Buenaventura Báez, Mella maintained a constant relationship with Santana. When Baez became president in September 1849, Mella was appointed Secretary of State for Commerce and the Treasury. He also briefly served as Minister of Finance of the Dominican Republic from 1849 to 1850. After serving his term, Mella once again retired to his home in Puerto Plata. For unknown reasons, Mella did not reconcile with Báez, instead choosing to align himself with Santana. Thus, upon Santana's return to power, Mella denounced Báez and advocated for his banishment.

=== Diplomatic mission to Spain ===
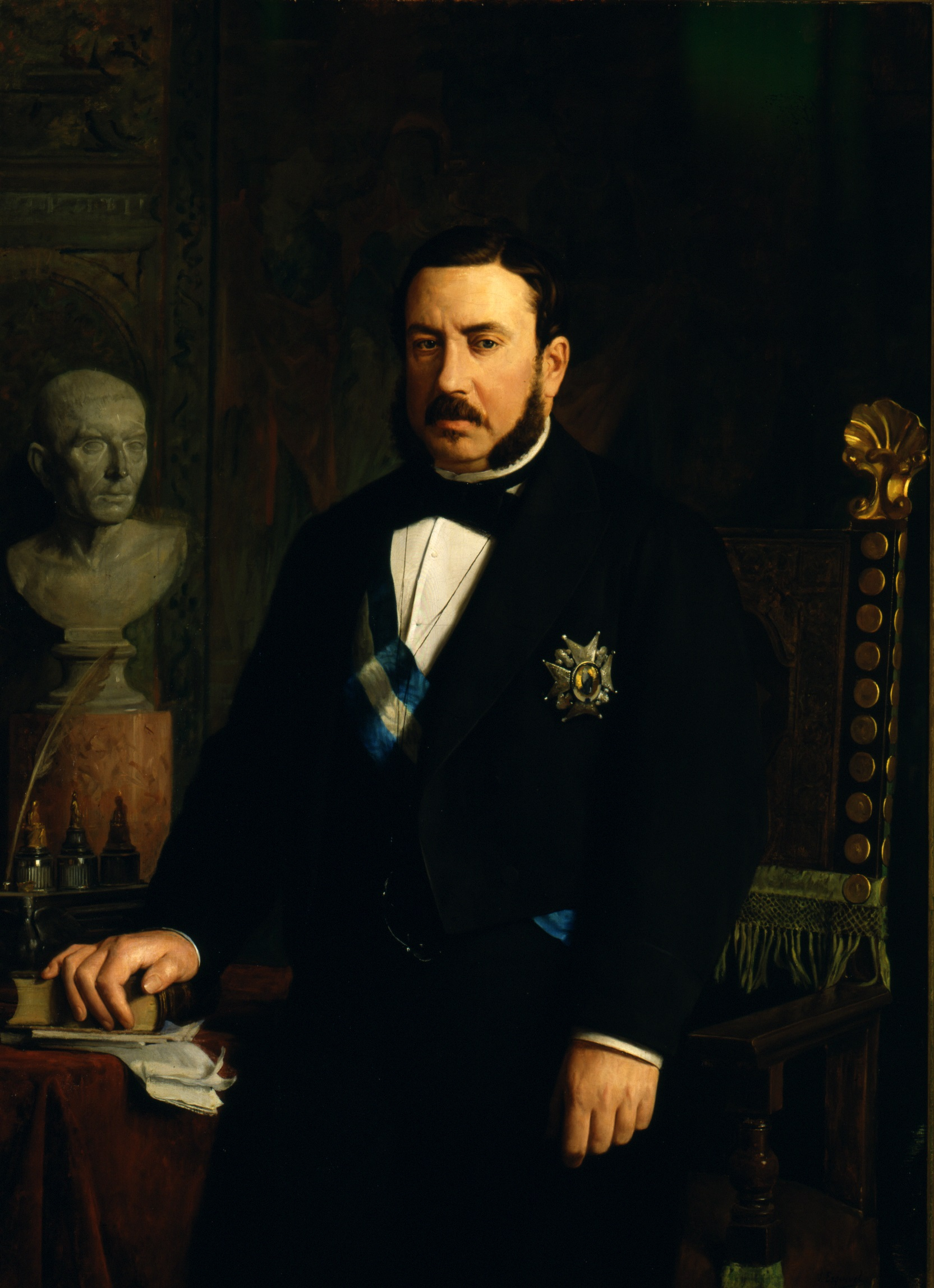
Disappointed in Spain's rejection to recognize Dominican independence, Mella wrote a letter to Luis José Sartorius, the 1st Count of San Luis, venting his dissatisfaction of the mission.

Mella's most important act was the diplomatic mission to the Spanish government, to obtain either a Spanish protectorate over the Dominican Republic or, if Spain was unwilling, at least diplomatic recognition. Mella believed that the plans the Haitian government constituted a real and imminent danger and that the country had no other option than to obtain the protection of power. The panic caused by the previous Haitian invasion was still alive in the collective memory, and the reports reaching Santo Domingo indicated that a new invasion would occur at any moment. It can be deduced that this fear was the basis of Mella's agreement with the Santana leadership, who was seen as a guarantee of independence against the aggressions from Haiti. In mid-December 1853, Mella embarked for Puerto Rico, where he obtained credentials from the governor, Fernándo Norzagaray y Escudero, and from there, he continued to Spain.

This mission he was on lasted for six months. He arrived in early February 1854 and, during the following months, he held negotiations with Spanish officials. At that time, Spain had no interest in a protectorate over the Dominican Republic and refused to recognize independence, because officials considered that it did not bring it any advantages. Secretly, Mella, still holding onto the morals of the Trinitarios, had anticipated Spain to agree to recognize Dominican independence. However, in one of the documents that he presented to the Spanish government, he stated that Spain was the legitimate owner of the territory of the Dominican Republic and that the protectorate over the latter meant for the old Metropolis one more guarantee, over those it may have today to be preserved indefinitely in the Caribbean. In May 1854, Mella decided to return to the Dominican Republic, but not before addressing in a farewell letter to Luis José Sartorius, who also was the President of the Council of Ministers, the reluctance of the Spanish government to recognize the independence of the Dominican Republic. In that letter, he writes:

Denied by Spain the recognition of the independence of the Republic; that is to say, having denied everything that today would surely make the Haitian invasion impossible or frustrating, it only remains for me to go to the point of danger to consecrate to my country and my family the services that I owe them as a citizen, as a soldier, and as a father. The case is serious and urgent; There is no time to lose; and the days that I spend here outside of mine are long and eternal centuries for my just how painful impatience.

At the end of May, Mella left Madrid and arrived sick in Santo Domingo in the first days of August. Days later he received votes for the vice presidency. Upon his return from Spain, Mella asked to be given a mission in Puerto Plata for the purpose of attending his mahogany court. After declining the position of Secretary of War, he was appointed to Commander of Arms for the city. He even accepted the position of governor of La Vega and became of one Santana's advisors.

By 1856, there was another threat to Dominican sovereignty. The Spanish consul, Antonio María Segovia, conspiring with Báez, carried out a plan to destabilize Santana's administration. This was due to the fact that Mella's mission in Madrid had failed, causing Santana to turn his attention to the United States for a protectorate. Alarmed, Spain agreed to the recognition of Dominican independence through the Dominican–Spanish Treaty (1855), to cease detrimental effects on its control of Cuba, an island that the United States aspired to annex. This resulted in a political scandal known as Segovia Registration Scandal. Báez's supporters registered at the consulate and took advantage of their status as Spaniards to deploy an active opposition. At one point Mella proposed to exercise dictatorship in order to counteract the Spanish consul, but he did not accept, and advocated for Segovia to be expelled from the nation. During a meeting at the Dominican National Palace, Mella exclaimed with the following: "The Constitutional Government has enough force of law to be respected and save the Nation. I, the Government, take Segovia, I wrap him in his flag, and expel him from the country." Santana, however, did not share his views.

In July 1856, he was tasked to draft a bill with the purpose of organizing the army, once again demonstrating his skills as a combatant and military man. He was even nominated for the position of Vice President, but he rejected it, instead suggesting the position to Felipe Benicio Alfau. The position was eventually filled by Manuel de Regla Mota, but resigned after a short term, handing the seat back to Báez. Immediately after assuming office, Baez ordered Santana's arrest and expulsion from the island. Santana would be deported to Martinique. However, most of his supporters, including Mella, were spared from persecution. He once again remained in Puerto Plata, away from public affairs, and concentrated on his wood cutting.

=== Cibaeño Revolution and aftermath ===
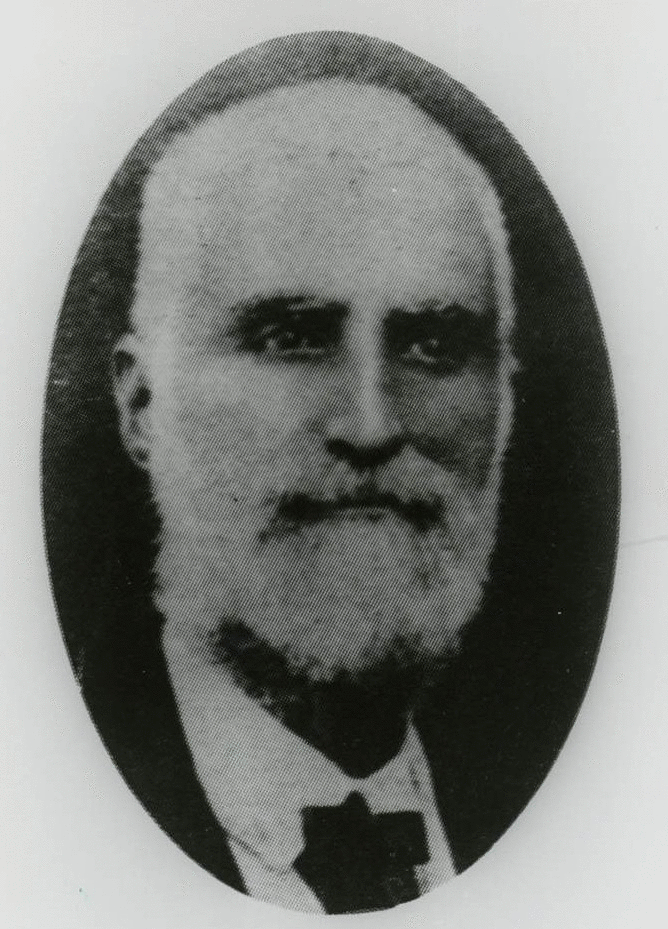
José Desiderio Valvérde

When the revolution against Buenaventura Baez began in Santiago on July 7, 1857, who with his economic mistakes had led the country to the threshold of a financial catastrophe, Mella was one of the first to join that movement of liberal and neo-Duartist orientation. In this famous civil war, Mella consolidated his immense military prestige with the audacious seizure of Plaza de Samaná, which he personally directed at the beginning of May 1858. Because of this action, he received one of the most brilliant and jubilant receptions that the people of Santiago gave him, of which the government was headed by José Desiderio Valverde. Although they did not coincide in frontal combat, the revolution put Mella and his old friend, Francisco del Rosario Sánchez, on opposing sides. Mella remained related to Santana after he took the presidency of the Dominican Republic for the last time in August 1858, after Báez's flight. Despite the consideration that President Valverde had shown him, Mella supported Santana's coup d'état, who again appointed him commander of arms of Puerto Plata.

After the revolution, Mella retired to the countryside, while still remaining active in the national affairs of the country. It was around those days that Jean-François-Maxime Raybaud, Consul General of France in Port-au-Prince, and already known as a sympathizer of the Dominicans, (like his predecessor Levasseur), appeared in the country to propose to President Santana to accept Emperor Soulouque's demands to merge the country with Haiti. Santana, outraged, not only rejected the proposal, but even sent Raybaud his passport so that he could immediately leave the Dominican Republic. The military authorities throughout the country adhered to Santana's attitude, and Mella, in Puerto Plata, led such a demonstration.

== Final struggle for independence ==
=== Return of Spanish rule ===
Following President Pedro Santana's decision to seek protection from Spain, the Dominican Republic was annexed on 20 March 1861. Matías Ramón Mella refused allegiance and was imprisoned in Ozama Fortress before being deported to Saint Thomas, where he lived in poverty.

General, the time has come to remind you by means of this letter that I am not a subject of her Catholic Majesty [...] I will fulfill my duty always as a son and citizen of the Dominican Republic. —Mella to Santana, 3 June 1861

Mella later returned clandestinely and attempted to reclaim command but fell ill. He learned that Francisco del Rosario Sánchez had been executed on 4 July 1861 for resisting annexation.

=== Joining the Restoration forces ===
After Francisco del Rosario Sánchez's execution in July 1863, Matías Ramón Mella clandestinely returned to the Dominican Republic by August, posing as a Spanish subject to evade authorities. He joined the provisional government in Santiago and was appointed Minister of War.

In January 1864, Mella issued a military manual advocating guerrilla tactics adapted to local terrain, arguing that small-unit, irregular warfare would offset the Spanish army's superiority in numbers and firepower. He also collaborated with Pedro Florentino and Gregorio Luperón to recruit and organise restoration troops across the south.

Despite his declining health, Mella attempted a southward mission via Jarabacoa and Constanza in February 1864 to bolster resistance in San Juan de la Maguana. The journey worsened his illness, and he returned to Santiago shortly before his death on 4 June 1864.

=== Duarte's final visit, death, and aftermath ===
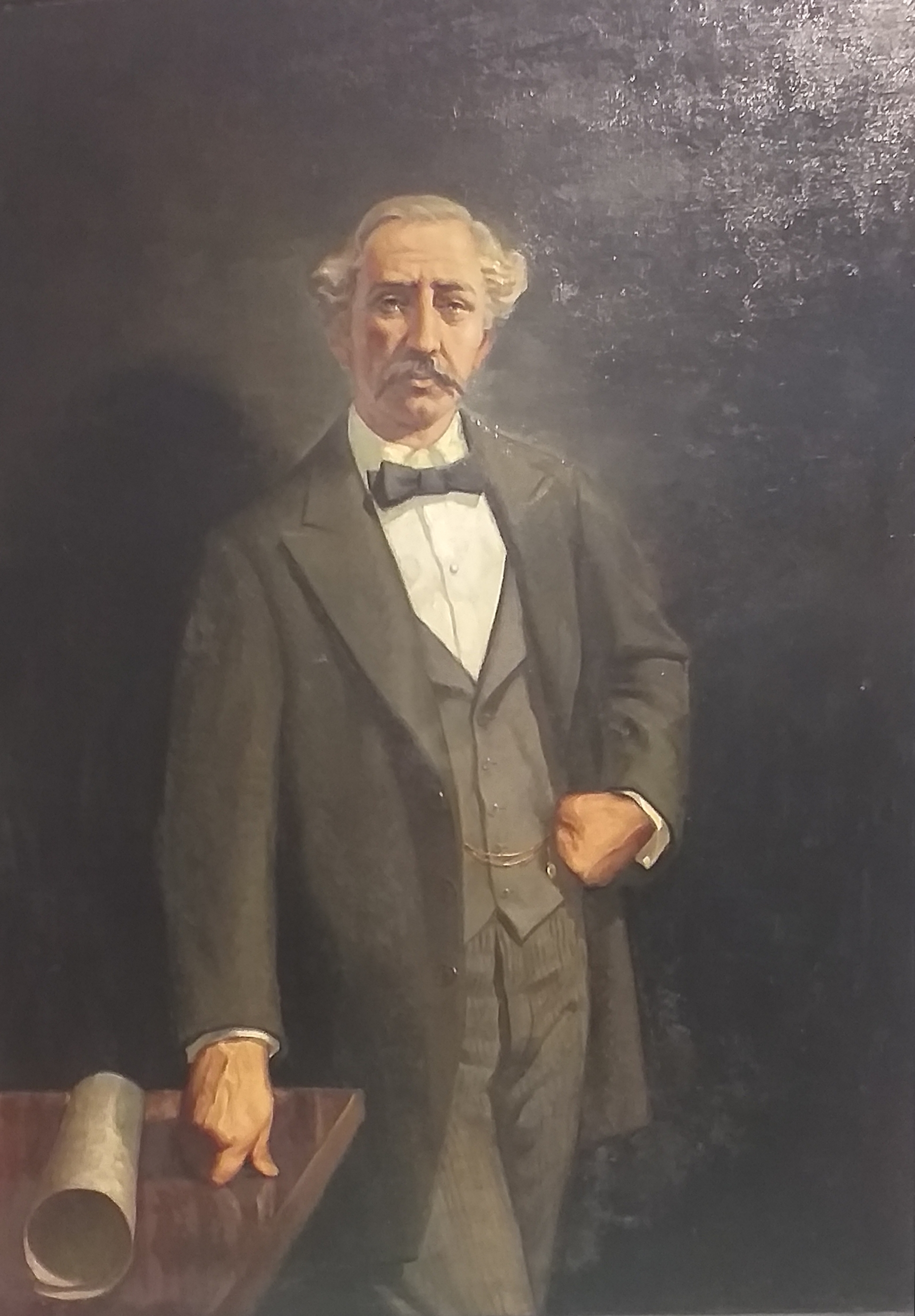
During the Restoration War, Duarte visited the ailing General Mella in Jamao.

On 27 March 1864, Juan Pablo Duarte travelled from Caracas to visit his comrade Matías Ramón Mella at his home in Jamao. Five days later, Duarte brought Mella to Santiago, where he spent his final days in a modest house beneath the San Luis Fortress.

He visited the illustrious Mella on 27 March, a soldier of two great eras, who was prostrated on his deathbed in a small improvised house near Fort San Luis. Duarte embraced him there, after twenty years of separation, not without expressing indignation at the extreme poverty in which that hero of February 27, 1844, lived. Mella told Duarte that, unable to live to see his homeland free, he wished to be buried wrapped in the national flag. This request moved Duarte to tears as he gave his final embrace.

Mella died on 4 June 1864 at age 48, having requested burial in the national flag. In 1894, President Ulises Heureaux officially recognized Duarte, Mella, and Francisco del Rosario Sánchez as the Dominican Republic’s Founding Fathers. On 27 February 1944, Rafael Trujillo ordered their transfer to the Altar of the Homeland at Puerta del Conde, where their ashes remain beneath the triumphal arch.

== Legacy ==
Matías Ramón Mella remains one of the most celebrated Founding Fathers of the Dominican Republic, revered for his leadership in the War of Independence and the Restoration War.

Luperón made his colleagues observe that since the former General Ramón Mella was in Jamao, it was of utmost importance to request an interview between the young restaurateur and the patriot of Independence... The nobleman veteran was not insensitive to this late call: hero of February 27, 1844, it was satisfactory for him to share the hardships of those of August 16, 1863.

Mella, one of those sympathetic figures of independence throughout the continent who, in addition to the internal qualities that great actions demand, had the personal attractions that seduce the crowds and the social merits that attract the most cultured portion of a society.

Mella, in addition to being a patriot, was a beautiful, educated nobleman [...] Mella was not much happier than the master of patriotism, Duarte, and his companion in noble actions, Sánchez.

His remains were exhumed in 1890 and reinterred in Santo Domingo on 25 February 1891, the 75th anniversary of his birth, with a state funeral on 27 February. In 1894, Ulises Heureaux formally designated Duarte, Mella, and Sánchez as the Republic’s official Founding Fathers. On 27 February 1944, Rafael Trujillo ordered their transfer to the Altar of the Homeland (Puerta del Conde), where their ashes rest beneath the triumphal arch.

Mella's legacy is honoured by monuments and place names:

- Altar de la Patria mausoleum at Puerta del Conde, alongside Duarte and Sánchez.
- The city of Mella in Independencia Province.
- Villa Mella district of Santo Domingo, recognized by UNESCO in 2001 for its African heritage.
- Puente Matías Ramón Mella over the Ozama River, inaugurated in 1972.
- His portrait on the 10-peso note and coin, and displayed with Duarte and Sánchez on the 100-peso note.

== Ancestry ==
Ancestors of Matías Ramón Mella

8. Bernardo Mella
4. Manuel Mella Sánchez (†1829); Santo Domingo, Colony of Santo Domingo
9. Juana Sánchez Maldonado (†1801)
2. Antonio Mella Álvarez (1794–1837); Santo Domingo, Colony of Santo Domingo
10. Manuel Álvarez (†1794); San Carlos de Tenerife, Colony of Santo Domingo
5. Juana Álvarez Pereyra (†1819); San Carlos de Tenerife, Colony of Santo Domingo
11. Isabel Pereyra (†1786); San Carlos de Tenerife, Colony of Santo Domingo
1. Matías Ramón Mella Castillo (1816–1864); Santo Domingo, Colony of Santo Domingo
6. José Castillo (†1811)
3. Francisca Javier Castillo Álvarez (1790–1864); Santo Domingo, Colony of Santo Domingo
7. Úrsula Álvarez (†1830)

== See also ==
- Juan Pablo Duarte
- Francisco del Rosario Sánchez
- José Maria Imbert
- Pedro Santana
- Julio Antonio Mella

== Sources ==
- Historical website of the Consulate General of the Dominican Republic in New York
- Historia Dominicana en Gráficas

== Bibliography ==
- Academia Dominicana de la Historia. Homenaje a Mella. Santo Domingo, 1964.
- Cassá, Roberto. Matías Ramón Mella: el patriotismo hecho acción. Santo Domingo, Dominican Republic: Tobogan, 1999.
- Cruz Sánchez, Filiberto. Mella. Biografía política. 2da ed. Santo Domingo, 1999.
- García, José Gabriel. Rasgos biográficos de dominicanos célebres. Santo Domingo, 1971.
- Jiménes Grullón, Juan Isidro. Sociología política dominicana. Vol. I. Santo Domingo, 1975.
- Martínez, Rufino. Diccionario biográfico-histórico dominicano (1821–1930). Santo Domingo, 1997.
- Rodríguez Demorizi, Emilio. Antecedentes de la Anexión a España. Ciudad Trujillo, 1955.
- Rodríguez Demorizi, Emilio. Actos y doctrina del gobierno de la Restauración. Santo Domingo, 1963.
- Soto Jiménez, José M. Semblanzas de los adalides militares de la independencia. (Santo Domingo), s. f.
- Cripps, Louise L. The Spanish Caribbean: From Columbus to Castro (1979).
- Fagg, John Edwin. Cuba, Haiti, and the Dominican Republic (1965).

Political offices
Preceded by Jacinto de la Concha	Minister of Finance; 1849–1850	Succeeded by Manuel Joaquín del Monte
Preceded by Benigno Filomeno de Rojas	Vice President of the Dominican Republic; 1863–1864	Succeeded by Ulises Francisco Espaillat
