= Battle of Santiago (1863) =

1863 battle of the Dominican Restoration War

- Part of the Dominican Restoration War
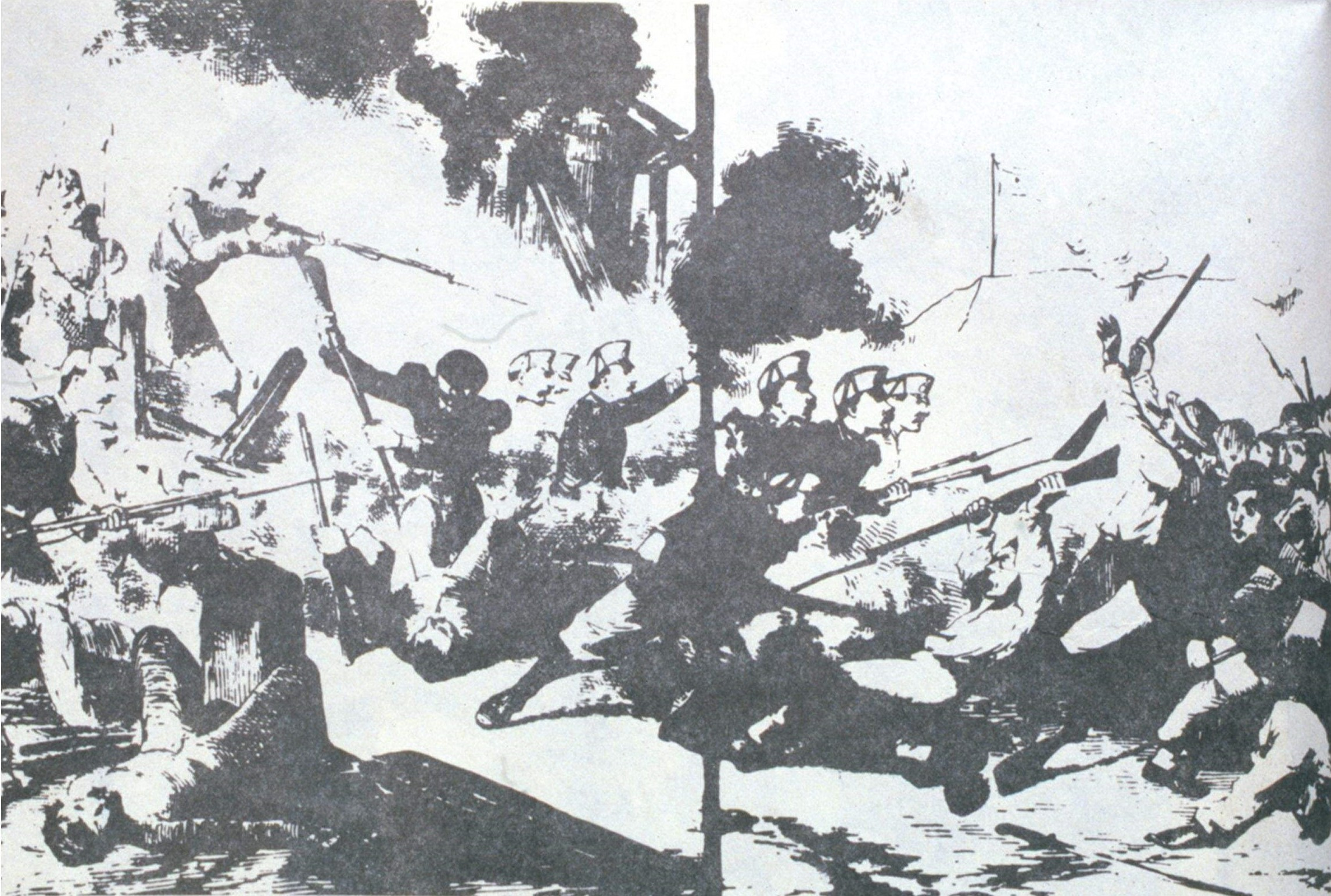
- Illustration of a Spanish bayonet charge on Dominican rebels in the Battle of Santiago (1863).
Date	September 6, 1863
Location	Santiago, Captaincy General of Santo Domingo
Result	Tactical Spanish victory

Belligerents
(Dominican Republic) Dominican rebels	Kingdom of Spain: (Spain) Captaincy General of Santo Domingo

Commanders and leaders
(Dominican Republic) Gaspar Polanco (Dominican Republic) Gregorio Luperón (Dominican Republic) Gregorio de Lora † (Dominican Republic) José Antonio Salcedo (Dominican Republic) Pedro Antonio Pimentel (Dominican Republic) Benito Monción	(Spain) Manuel Buceta (Spain) Juan Suero

Strength
6,000 troops 3 forts 3 artillery pieces	3,900 troops 1 fort

Casualties and losses
500 approximately 3 forts lost	153 killed or wounded (Fort Patria only)

The Battle of Santiago (Spanish: Batalla de Santiago de 1863) took place on September 6, 1863, during the Dominican Restoration War. Dominican troops launched repeated frontal assaults on Fort San Luis, which were repelled by Spanish rifle and artillery fire, inflicting heavy Dominican losses. A column of 3,000 Spanish reinforcements then entered Santiago, while the Dominicans defended the forts of Dios, Patria, and Libertad. The Spanish attacked Fort Patria and were repelled by Dominican cannon fire, suffering 153 casualties, but ultimately captured all three forts.

The Spanish withdrew from Santiago on September 13 due to scarce provisions and the garrison's isolated position. During their 3-day march from Santiago to Puerto Plata, the Spanish troops were repeatedly attacked by guerrillas, suffering 1,300 casualties. The Dominicans also failed to capture Fort San Felipe and were defeated by the Spanish in Puerto Plata in October.

During the Battle of Santiago, in addition to General Gregorio de Lora, other Dominican officers died. The Spanish also killed General Luperón's horse.

== See also ==
- Grito del Capotillo
- Dominican Act of Independence (1863)
