= Gregorio de Lora =

Dominican militant and soldier (1815–1863)

Gregorio de Lora (1815 – September 6, 1863) was a Dominican general who was a hero in the Dominican War of Independence. He would later fight in the Dominican Restoration War, in which he died in combat.

== Early life ==
He was born in Puerto Plata in 1815, during the España Boba era. Not much is known about his childhood or early adulthood, but it is known that he had fought in the Dominican War of Independence; he was deserving of honorable mentions for the courage and ability demonstrated in the famous Battle of Sabana Larga, fought on January 24, 1856. He had attained the rank of Brigadier general and chief of a regiment by the end of the 1850s.

== Restoration War ==
In 1861, Spanish forces invaded the island. The Spanish kept him as commander of the square, but when the uprising led by Juan Nouesí, of August 27, 1863, De Lora was sent to repress and suffocate him. The patriots invited him to join the movement, De Lora accepted and was recognized on the spot as head of the restorative columns in Puerto Plata. The Spanish, surrounded in the San Felipe Fortress, were under the threatening siege of the patriots when reinforcements from Cuba and Puerto Rico arrived in the night of the same August 27 and based on their material superiority, they evicted the nationals from the urban area and forced them to retreat to the fields.

The resistance in Puerto Plata was under the command of Nouesí, while De Lora marched to Santiago, where the battle for control of the city was being fought. He arrived via the Jamao route, joined the fight and in the decisive moments of the hard day September 6, 1863, he advanced with his men through the General Valverde Street, (today San Luis), taking a trench of the enemy. He fought with deadly intensity. The downloads rifle and cannon were made at point-blank range, and the besieged repelled the assailants with their points of the bayonets and with streams of shrapnel, as Gregorio Luperón narrates.

== Death ==
De Lora advanced heroically and with his proverbial fearlessness, when he fell wounded two steps away from the trench and could not continue fighting. Thirty officers died at his side from Puerto Plata, and before taking charge of the survivors of the column were left without their own boss, Luperón ordered the transfer of the wounded in the canton of Los Chachaces. From there, they moved him to Moca, where the brave warrior contracted tetanus and died as a result. He was one of the four generals who fell during the Restoration War. The remaining three were Antonio Caba, in the combat on the San Pedro savanna; Santiago Mota, in the eastern town of Pulgarín; and Benito Martínez, in the assault on the Spanish trenches in Puerto Plata.

== See also ==
- Antonio Caba
- Santiago Mota
- Benito Martínez
- Gregorio Luperón
