= Demographics of the Dominican Republic =

Demographics of Dominican Republic
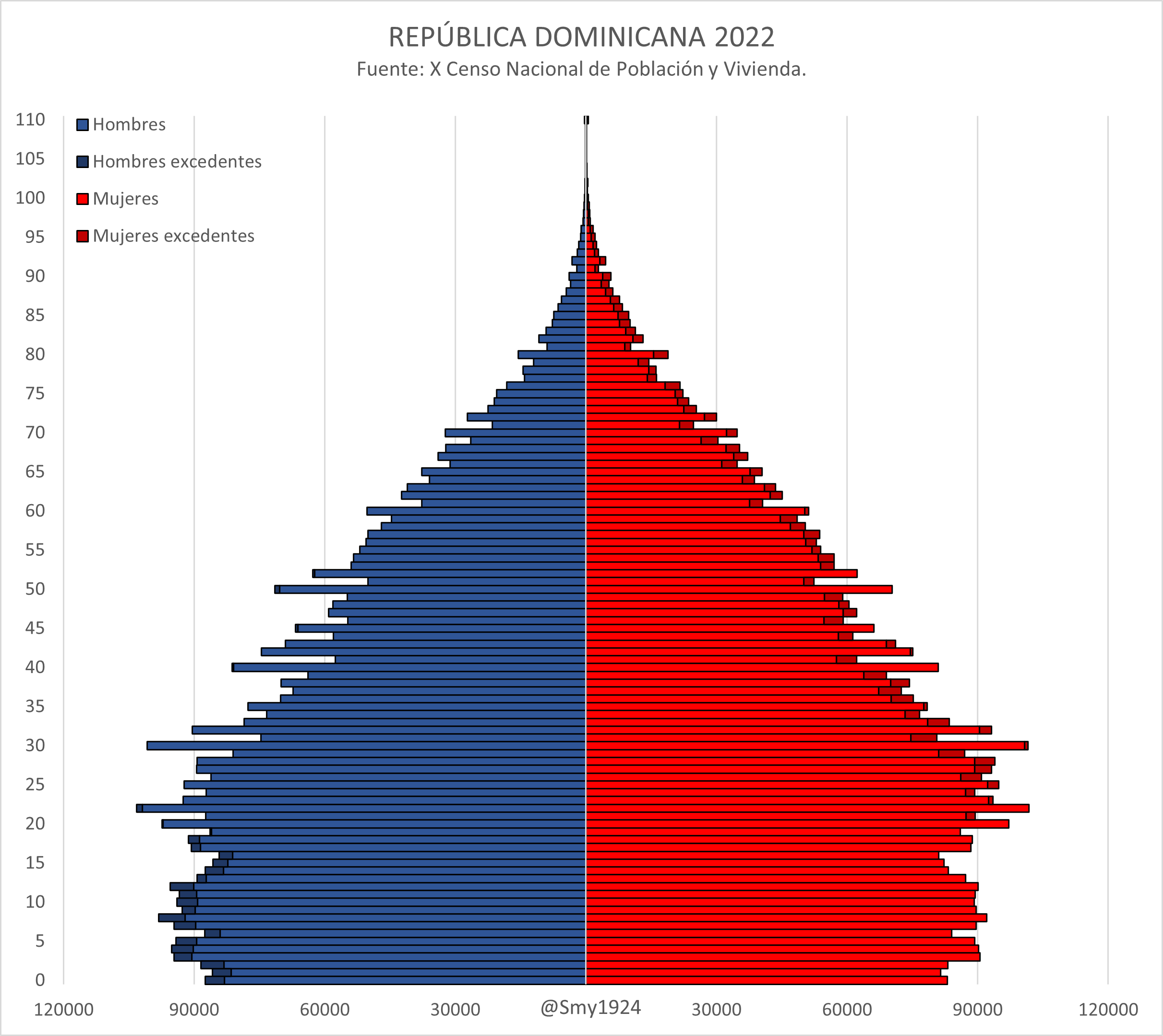
- Population pyramid of Dominican Republic in 2022
- Population: 10,771,504 (2022 census)
- Growth rate: 0.91% (2022 est.)
- Birth rate: 11.4 births/1,000 population (2025 est.)
- Death rate: 4.0 deaths/1,000 population (2025 est.)
- Life expectancy: 72.56 years
  - male: 70.86 years
  - female: 74.33 years (2022 est.)
- Fertility rate: 1.97 children born/woman (2026 est.)
- Infant mortality: 21.18 deaths/1,000 live births
- Net migration rate: -2.68 migrant(s)/1,000 population (2022 est.)

Age structure
- 0–14 years: 26.85%
- 15–64 years: 64.98%
- 65 and over: 8.17%

Sex ratio
- Total: 1.02 male(s)/female (2022 est.)
- At birth: 1.04 male(s)/female
- Under 15: 1.03 male(s)/female
- 65 and over: 0.73 male(s)/female

Nationality
- Nationality: Dominican
- Major ethnic: Mixed (71.72%); Indio (34.20%); Moreno (25.97%); Mestizo (7.72%); Mulatto (3.83%)
- Minor ethnic: White (18.70%); Black (7.45%); East Asian (0.33%); Other (1.80%)

Language
- Official: Spanish

This is a demography of the population of the Dominican Republic including population density, ethnicity, education level, health of the populace, economic status, religious affiliations and other aspects of the population.

== Population size and structure ==
Census population

| Year | Pop. | ±% p.a. |
|---|---|---|
| 1844 | 132,275 | — |
| 1850 | 146,835 | +1.76% |
| 1860 | 188,440 | +2.53% |
| 1870 | 243,047 | +2.58% |
| 1880 | 313,223 | +2.57% |
| 1890 | 403,638 | +2.57% |
| 1900 | 521,386 | +2.59% |
| 1910 | 694,364 | +2.91% |
| 1920 | 896,843 | +2.59% |
| 1930 | 1,267,768 | +3.52% |

| Year | Pop. | ±% p.a. |
|---|---|---|
| 1940 | 1,702,095 | +2.99% |
| 1950 | 2,379,897 | +3.41% |
| 1960 | 3,268,340 | +3.22% |
| 1970 | 4,399,292 | +3.02% |
| 1980 | 5,729,043 | +2.68% |
| 1990 | 7,151,163 | +2.24% |
| 2000 | 8,584,196 | +1.84% |
| 2010 | 9,820,181 | +1.35% |
| 2020 | 11,008,297 | +1.15% |

The area was first included in world trade in 1492 when Christopher Columbus docked on the island of Hispaniola. When Spain occupied the country in 1496, the population consisted of Arawak (Taíno Indians). When Spain returned in 1496, they founded the current capital, Santo Domingo, as the first European city in America. The country came under Spanish rule. France took over the part of Hispaniola that is today Haiti. During the colony era, The Dominican Republic acted as a sugar supplier to Spain and France. Many whites moved to the country during this period. In 1496, Santo Domingo was built and became the new capital, and remains the oldest continuously inhabited European city in the Americas. Today, two other large groups have joined, while the indigenous population has mostly disappeared. 45% of Dominicans consider themselves to have some significant Indigenous/Endemic ancestry, 18% are white, 7.8% are fully or predominantly black and 74% are mixed (Mestizo/Mulatto/"Indio"/Trigueño). About 9.2% of the Dominican population claims a European immigrant background, according to the 2021 Fondo de Población de las Naciones Unidas survey. During the many years that have passed since the great immigration, the races have been mixed and it can be difficult to distinguish. In terms of race, they are all similar to the other Caribbean islands. The Spaniards brought Christianity to the Dominican Republic, and today about 50% of the population reports as being Catholic. One clear remnant of the Spanish colonial era on the population is the official and widespread use of the Spanish language.

View source data.
View source data.
View source data.
View source data.

According to the 2022 revision of the World Population Prospects the total population was 11,117,873 in 2021, compared to 2,380,000 in 1950. The proportion of the population aged below 15 in 2010 was 31.2%, 62.8% were aged between 15 and 65 years of age, while 6% were aged 65 years or older.

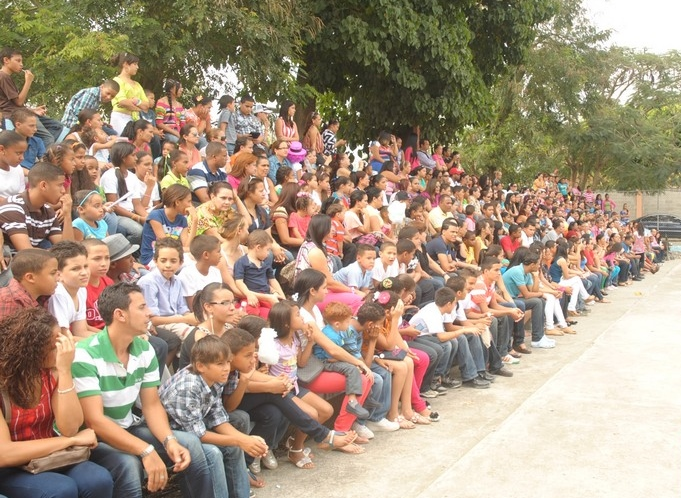
Group of Dominicans in the town of Moca.

| | Total population ( × 1000) | Proportion | | |
| | Total population ( × 1000) | aged 0–14 | aged 15–64 | aged 65+ |
|---|---|---|---|---|
| 1950 | 2 380 | 45.5% | 51.7% | 2.7% |
| 1955 | 2 796 | 46.3% | 51.1% | 2.6% |
| 1960 | 3 312 | 48.2% | 49.2% | 2.6% |
| 1965 | 3 900 | 48.9% | 48.5% | 2.6% |
| 1970 | 4 524 | 47.7% | 49.7% | 2.7% |
| 1975 | 5 169 | 45.3% | 51.9% | 2.8% |
| 1980 | 5 826 | 42.6% | 54.4% | 3.1% |
| 1985 | 6 524 | 40.4% | 56.2% | 3.4% |
| 1990 | 7 245 | 38.5% | 57.6% | 3.9% |
| 1995 | 7 978 | 37.0% | 58.5% | 4.5% |
| 2000 | 8 663 | 34.9% | 59.9% | 5.1% |
| 2005 | 9 343 | 33.1% | 61.3% | 5.7% |
| 2010 | 10 017 | 31.2% | 62.8% | 6.0% |
| 2015 | 10 528 | 30.0% | 63.4% | 6.7% |
| 2020 | 11 107 | 28.3% | 62.8% | 7.6% |

=== Structure of the population ===
Population Estimates by Sex and Age Group (01.VII.2017) (Data refer to national projections.):

| Age group | Male | Female | Total | % |
|---|---|---|---|---|
| Total | 5 082 876 | 5 086 296 | 10 169 172 | 100 |
| 0–4 | 492 808 | 472 820 | 965 628 | 9.49 |
| 5–9 | 492 702 | 474 348 | 967 050 | 9.50 |
| 10–14 | 492 107 | 477 445 | 969 552 | 9.53 |
| 15–19 | 480 035 | 471 501 | 951 536 | 9.51 |
| 20–24 | 455 440 | 453 444 | 930 505 | 9.15 |
| 25–29 | 420 715 | 423 382 | 844 907 | 8.30 |
| 30–34 | 377 850 | 385 180 | 763 030 | 7.50 |
| 35–39 | 339 877 | 348 143 | 688 020 | 6.76 |
| 40–44 | 306 907 | 313 858 | 616 955 | 6.07 |
| 45–49 | 275 488 | 282 105 | 557 593 | 5.48 |
| 50–54 | 245 299 | 249 766 | 495 065 | 4.87 |
| 55–59 | 206 257 | 210 188 | 416 445 | 4.10 |
| 60–64 | 162 912 | 168 103 | 331 015 | 3.25 |
| 65–69 | 121 894 | 126 929 | 248 523 | 2.44 |
| 70–74 | 86 739 | 90 761 | 177 500 | 1.74 |
| 75–79 | 61 133 | 65 274 | 126 407 | 1.24 |
| 80+ | 65 523 | 73 349 | 138 872 | 1.36 |
| Age group | Male | Female | Total | Percent |
| 0–14 | 1 595 851 | 1 538 432 | 3 134 283 | 30.56 |
| 15–64 | 3 213 973 | 3 268 108 | 6 482 081 | 63.19 |
| 65+ | 306 501 | 334 859 | 641 360 | 6.25 |

Population Estimates by Sex and Age Group (01.VII.2021) (Data refer to national projections.):

| Age group | Male | Female | Total | % |
|---|---|---|---|---|
| Total | 5 259 642 | 5 275 893 | 10 535 535 | 100 |
| 0–4 | 483 891 | 463 927 | 947 818 | 9.00 |
| 5–9 | 490 677 | 471 962 | 962 639 | 9.14 |
| 10–14 | 483 264 | 468 329 | 951 593 | 9.03 |
| 15–19 | 479 169 | 469 840 | 949 009 | 9.01 |
| 20–24 | 456 645 | 454 343 | 910 988 | 8.65 |
| 25–29 | 432 645 | 433 391 | 866 036 | 8.22 |
| 30–34 | 397 618 | 402 420 | 800 038 | 7.59 |
| 35–39 | 359 670 | 365 118 | 724 788 | 6.88 |
| 40–44 | 324 954 | 331 269 | 656 223 | 6.23 |
| 45–49 | 292 170 | 300 700 | 592 870 | 5.63 |
| 50–54 | 261 184 | 269 338 | 530 522 | 5.04 |
| 55–59 | 228 775 | 236 116 | 464 891 | 4.41 |
| 60–64 | 186 503 | 193 210 | 379 713 | 3.60 |
| 65–69 | 141 674 | 150 452 | 292 126 | 2.77 |
| 70–74 | 100 692 | 107 713 | 208 405 | 1.98 |
| 75–79 | 65 820 | 71 673 | 137 493 | 1.31 |
| 80+ | 74 291 | 86 092 | 160 383 | 1.52 |
| Age group | Male | Female | Total | Percent |
| 0–14 | 1 457 832 | 1 404 218 | 2 862 050 | 27.17 |
| 15–64 | 3 419 333 | 3 455 745 | 6 875 078 | 65.26 |
| 65+ | 382 477 | 415 930 | 798 407 | 7.58 |

== Vital statistics ==
=== UN estimates ===
Population, fertility rate and net reproduction rate, United Nations estimates

Registration of vital events is not universal in the Dominican Republic. The Population Department of the United Nations prepared the following estimates:

| Period | Live births per year | Deaths per year | Natural change per year | CBR* | CDR* | NC* | TFR* | IMR* | Life expectancy total | Life expectancy males | Life expectancy females |
|---|---|---|---|---|---|---|---|---|---|---|---|
| 1950–1955 | 140 000 | 53 000 | 87 000 | 54.3 | 20.5 | 33.8 | 7.60 | 153 | 46.0 | 44.7 | 47.3 |
| 1955–1960 | 163 000 | 54 000 | 109 000 | 53.4 | 17.6 | 35.8 | 7.64 | 139 | 49.9 | 48.6 | 51.4 |
| 1960–1965 | 178 000 | 52 000 | 126 000 | 49.5 | 14.5 | 35.0 | 7.35 | 124 | 53.6 | 52.1 | 55.2 |
| 1965–1970 | 186 000 | 50 000 | 136 000 | 44.2 | 11.8 | 32.3 | 6.65 | 109 | 56.9 | 55.4 | 58.7 |
| 1970–1975 | 190 000 | 47 000 | 143 000 | 39.2 | 9.7 | 29.6 | 5.68 | 96 | 59.8 | 58.1 | 61.8 |
| 1975–1980 | 194 000 | 46 000 | 149 000 | 35.4 | 8.3 | 27.1 | 4.76 | 86 | 62.0 | 60.3 | 64.0 |
| 1980–1985 | 206 000 | 46 000 | 160 000 | 33.4 | 7.5 | 25.9 | 4.15 | 75 | 64.0 | 62.1 | 66.1 |
| 1985–1990 | 213 000 | 46 000 | 168 000 | 31.0 | 6.7 | 24.3 | 3.65 | 63 | 66.5 | 64.3 | 69.0 |
| 1990–1995 | 218 000 | 46 000 | 172 000 | 28.7 | 6.0 | 22.7 | 3.31 | 48 | 69.0 | 66.5 | 71.9 |
| 1995–2000 | 215 000 | 50 000 | 165 000 | 25.8 | 6.0 | 19.8 | 2.98 | 41 | 70.0 | 67.3 | 73.1 |
| 2000–2005 | 219 000 | 54 000 | 165 000 | 23.8 | 6.1 | 17.7 | 2.75 | 35 | 71.1 | 68.1 | 74.4 |
| 2005–2010 | 221 000 | 58 000 | 163 000 | 22.0 | 6.0 | 16.0 | 2.57 | 30 | 72.2 | 69.2 | 75.5 |
| 2010–2015 | | | | 20.9 | 6.1 | 14.8 | 2.57 | | | | |
| 2015–2020 | | | | 19.7 | 6.1 | 13.6 | 2.45 | | | | |
| 2020–2025 | | | | 18.0 | 6.4 | 11.6 | 2.36 | | | | |
| 2025–2030 | | | | 16.5 | 6.7 | 9.8 | 2.23 | | | | |
| 2030–2035 | | | | 15.2 | 7.1 | 8.1 | 2.12 | | | | |
| 2035–2040 | | | | 14.2 | 7.5 | 6.7 | 2.03 | | | | |
* CBR = crude birth rate (per 1000); CDR = crude death rate (per 1000); NC = natural change (per 1000); IMR = infant mortality rate per 1000 births; TFR = total fertility rate (number of children per woman)

=== Registered births and deaths ===
| Year | Population | Live births | Deaths | Natural increase | Crude birth rate | Crude death rate | Rate of natural increase | Crude migration rate | TFR |
|---|---|---|---|---|---|---|---|---|---|
| 2001 | 8,512,996 | 196,369 | 28,861 | 167,508 | 22.8 | 3.4 | 19.5 | | 2.571 |
| 2002 | 8,627,509 | 193,605 | 26,863 | 166,742 | 22.1 | 3.1 | 19.0 | -5.7 | 2.494 |
| 2003 | 8,745,084 | 180,084 | 30,125 | 149,959 | 20.3 | 3.4 | 16.9 | -3.5 | 2.272 |
| 2004 | 8,857,648 | 171,001 | 34,856 | 136,145 | 19.0 | 3.9 | 15.1 | -2.4 | 2.142 |
| 2005 | 8,968,144 | 171,685 | 34,725 | 136,960 | 18.5 | 3.8 | 14.6 | -2.3 | 2.086 |
| 2006 | 9,071,458 | 159,919 | 32,738 | 127,181 | 17.4 | 3.6 | 13.8 | -2.4 | 1.974 |
| 2007 | 9,174,058 | 158,205 | 34,300 | 123,905 | 17.1 | 3.7 | 13.4 | -2.2 | 1.941 |
| 2008 | 9,279,602 | 165,649 | 34,406 | 131,243 | 17.6 | 3.7 | 14.0 | -2.6 | 2.025 |
| 2009 | 9,380,152 | 172,524 | 34,272 | 138,252 | 17.9 | 3.6 | 14.2 | -3.5 | 2.055 |
| 2010 | 9,478,612 | 172,287 | 37,020 | 135,267 | 17.9 | 3.9 | 14.0 | -3.6 | 2.054 |
| 2011 | 9,580,139 | 178,494 | 36,658 | 141,836 | 18.4 | 3.8 | 14.6 | -4.0 | 2.116 |
| 2012 | 9,680,963 | 173,437 | 36,923 | 136,514 | 17.5 | 3.8 | 13.8 | -3.4 | 2.028 |
| 2013 | 9,784,680 | 176,426 | 36,936 | 139,490 | 17.5 | 3.7 | 13.8 | -3.2 | 2.036 |
| 2014 | 9,883,486 | 180,283 | 41,643 | 138,640 | 17.7 | 4.2 | 13.5 | -3.5 | 2.065 |
| 2015 | 9,980,243 | 173,477 | 42,194 | 131,283 | 17.1 | 4.2 | 12.9 | -3.2 | 1.998 |
| 2016 | 10,075,045 | 164,155 | 44,554 | 119,601 | 16.1 | 4.4 | 11.7 | -2.3 | 1.883 |
| 2017 | 10,169,172 | 173,483 | 43,719 | 129,764 | 16.8 | 4.3 | 12.5 | -3.2 | 1.982 |
| 2018 | 10,266,149 | 179,894 | 43,125 | 136,769 | 17.2 | 4.2 | 13.0 | -3.6 | 2.057 |
| 2019 | 10,358,320 | 183,481 | 45,250 | 138,231 | 17.3 | 4.3 | 13.0 | -4.1 | 2.089 |
| 2020 | 10,448,499 | 166,656 | 48,162 | 118,494 | 15.3 | 4.5 | 10.8 | -2.2 | 1.878 |
| 2021 | 10,535,535 | 174,144 | 51,535 | 122,609 | 15.9 | 4.8 | 11.2 | -2.9 | 1.972 |
| 2022 | 10,621,938 | 173,513 | 46,961 | 126,552 | 16.0 | 4.2 | 11.8 | -3.7 | 1.964 |
| 2023 | 10,711,155 | 165,103 | 46,535 | 118,568 | 15.3 | 4.3 | 11.0 | -2.2 | 1.820 |
| 2024 | 10,795,677 | 144,855 | 44,894 | 99,961 | 13.4 | 4.2 | 9.2 | | 1.606 |
| 2025 | 10,878,267 | 123,759 | 43,032 | 80,727 | 11.4 | 4.0 | 7.4 | | 1.373(e) |

=== Fertility ===
Total Fertility Rate (TFR) (Wanted Fertility Rate) and Crude Birth Rate (CBR):

| Year | Total | | Urban | | Rural |
|---|---|---|---|---|---|---|
| Year | 1965–69 | | 7,1 |
| 1970–74 | | 5,8 |
| 1975–79 | | 4,7 |
| 1980–82 | | 4,31 |
| 1983–85 | | 3,69 |
| 1986 | | 3,8 (2,8) | | 3,2 (2,5) | | 5,1 (3,5) |
| 1991 | 30,1 | 3,3 (2,6) | 29,7 | 2,8 (2,3) | 30,5 | 4,4 (3,1) |
| 1996 | 27,7 | 3,2 (2,5) | 24,4 | 2,8 (2,2) | 29,8 | 4,0 (3,0) |
| 1999 | | 2,9 (2,3) | | 2,7 (2,1) | | 3,4 (2,7) |
| 2002 | 25,2 | 3,0 (2,3) | 25,3 | 2,8 (2,3) | 24,9 | 3,3 (2,5) |
| 2007 | 20,4 | 2,4 (1,9) | 20,0 | 2,3 (1,8) | 21,4 | 2,8 (2,1) |
| 2013 | 20,9 | 2,5 (2,0) | 21,2 | 2,4 (1,9) | 20,3 | 2,6 (2,1) |

| Years | 1925 | 1926 | 1927 | 1928 | 1929 |
|---|---|---|---|---|---|
| Total Fertility Rate in Dominican Republic | 6.16 | 6.16 | 6.16 | 6.16 | 6.16 |

| Years | 1930 | 1931 | 1932 | 1933 | 1934 | 1935 | 1936 | 1937 | 1938 | 1939 |
|---|---|---|---|---|---|---|---|---|---|---|
| Total Fertility Rate in Dominican Republic | 6.16 | 6.16 | 6.16 | 6.16 | 6.16 | 6.16 | 6.25 | 6.34 | 6.43 | 6.52 |

| Years | 1940 | 1941 | 1942 | 1943 | 1944 | 1945 | 1946 | 1947 | 1948 | 1949 |
|---|---|---|---|---|---|---|---|---|---|---|
| Total Fertility Rate in Dominican Republic | 6.61 | 6.70 | 6.79 | 6.88 | 6.97 | 7.06 | 7.15 | 7.24 | 7.33 | 7.42 |

== Ethnic groups ==
As of 2014, mixed-race people comprise the largest ethnic group at 70.4%. Of that number, 50.4% identify as mestizo and 12.4% as mulatto. The second-largest group are Black Dominicans at 15.8%. 13.5% of Dominicans identify as White, and 0.3% identify as Other.

== Religion ==
Roman Catholic 51.3%, Evangelical 13%, Protestant 7.9%, Adventist 1.4%, other 1.8%, atheist 0.2%, none 22.4%, unspecified 2% (2018 est.)

== Languages ==
- Spanish (official)

== See also ==
- Health in the Dominican Republic
- Youth in the Dominican Republic

Census information:

- 1920 Santo Domingo Census
- 1950 Dominican Republic Census
- 1960 Dominican Republic Census
- 1970 Dominican Republic Census
- 2010 Dominican Republic Census
