= Alfonseca =

Alfonseca is a Spanish surname. Notable people with the surname include:

- Antonio Alfonseca (b. 1972), Dominican baseball pitcher
- Juan Bautista Alfonseca (1810–1875), Dominican military officer and composer
- Manuel Alfonseca (b. 1946), Spanish writer and university professor
- Rosa María Alfonseca (b. 1953), Mexican graphic artist
