= Mixed-race Dominicans =

Dominicans of mixed racial origins

Mixed Dominicans
Dominicanos mixtos (Spanish)
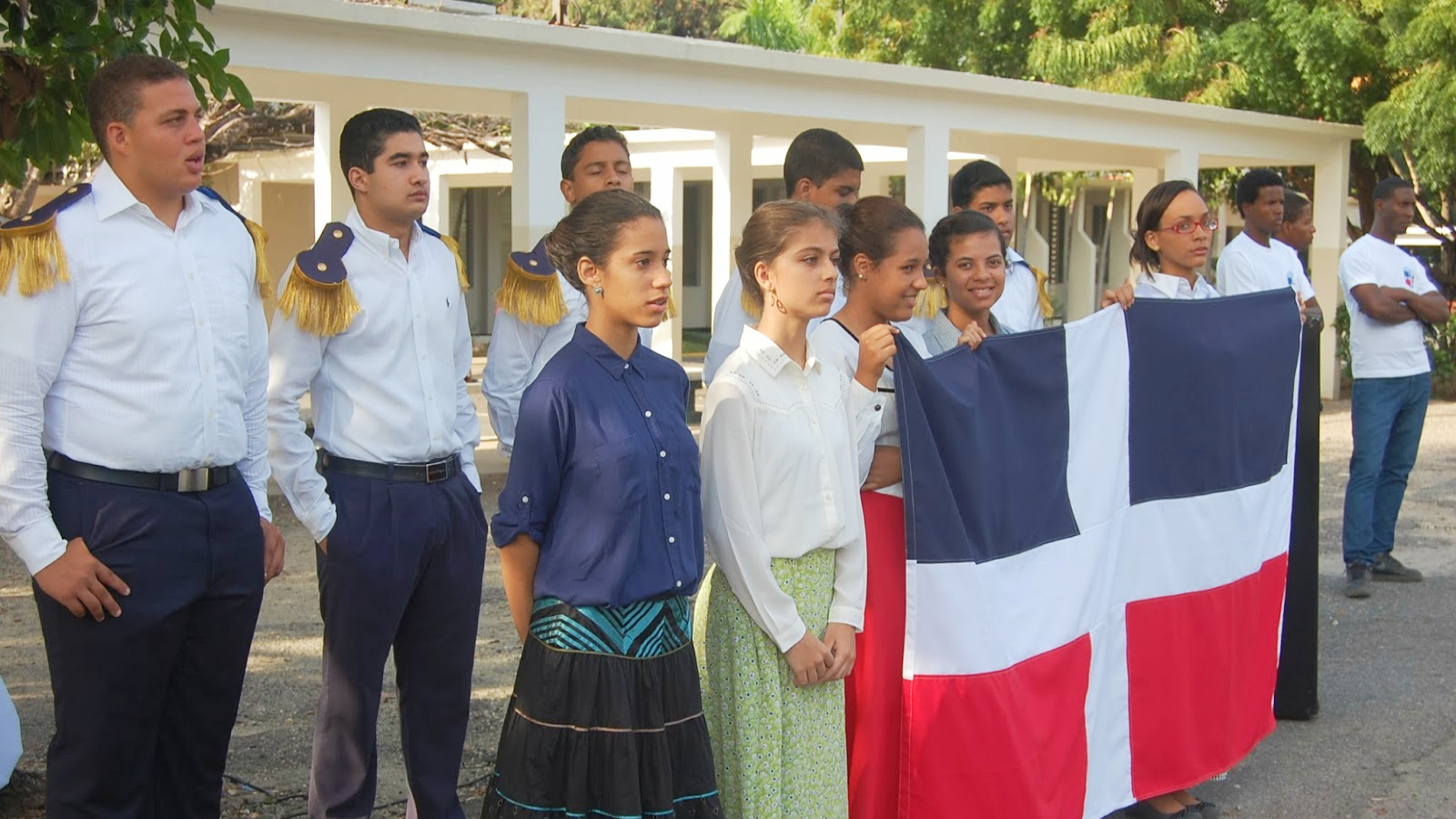
- Mixed-race Dominicans, students with historic 1844 flag.

Total population
- Mixed ancestry predominates ▲6,179,341 (2022 census) ▼71.72% of the Dominican population (Only 12 years and older); Mixed Dominican groups: • Indio: 2,946,377 (34.20%) • Moreno: 2,237,370 (25.97%) • Mestizo: 665,387 (7.72%) • Mulatto: 330,207 (3.83%)

Languages
- Dominican Spanish

Religion
- Majority: Roman Catholicism; Minority: Protestantism

Related ethnic groups
- Dominicans; White Dominicans · Black Dominicans

Mixed Dominicans (Spanish: Dominicanos mixtos) or Moreno Dominicans (Spanish: Dominicanos morenos), also referred to as mulatto, mestizo or historically zambo, are Dominicans who are of mixed ancestry (mainly white and black, to a lesser extent native), these stand out for having brown skin. Representing 71.72% of the Dominican Republic's population, they are by far the single largest racial grouping of the country.

Mixed Dominicans are the descendants from the racial integration between the Europeans, the Indigenous population, and later the Africans. They have a total population of over 6 million.

The Dominican Republic was the site of the first European settlement in the Americas, the Captaincy General of Santo Domingo founded in 1493. After the arrival of Europeans and the founding of the colony, Black African people were imported to the island. The fusion of European, native Taino, and African influences contributed to the development of present-day Dominican culture.

== History ==
=== Native peoples ===
Prior to European colonization the inhabitants of the island were the Arawakan-speaking Taíno, a seafaring people who moved into Hispaniola from the north-east region of South America, displacing earlier inhabitants, c. AD 650. The native Tainos divided the island into several chiefdoms and engaged in farming, fishing, as well as hunting, and gathering.

The Spaniards arrived in 1492. Columbus and his crew were the first Europeans to encounter the Taíno people. Columbus described the native Taínos as a physically tall, and well-proportioned people, with a noble character. After initially amicable relationships, the Taínos fought against the conquest, led by the female Chief Anacaona of Xaragua and her ex-husband Chief Caonabo of Maguana, as well as Chiefs Guacanagaríx, Guamá, Hatuey, and Enriquillo. The latter's successes gained his people an autonomous enclave for a time on the island. Within a few years after 1492 the population of Taínos had declined drastically, due to warfare and intermixing. Census records from 1514 reveal that at least 40% of Spanish men in Santo Domingo were married to Taíno women, and many present-day Dominicans have significant Taíno ancestry.

=== European colonization ===
Christopher Columbus arrived on the island in December 5, 1492, during the first of his four voyages to the Americas. He claimed the land for Spain and named it La Española due to its diverse climate and terrain which reminded him of the Spanish landscape. In 1496, Bartholomew Columbus, Christopher's brother, built the city of Santo Domingo in the southern coast of the island. The colony became a military base of Spanish conquistadors for the further Spanish conquest of the Americas and the first seat of Spanish colonial rule in the New World. For centuries the colony fought against British, Dutch, and French expeditions into the region until the 17th century when pirates working for the French Empire took over part of the west coast. After decades of armed conflicts, Spain ceded the western third of Hispaniola to France in the Treaty of Ryswick.

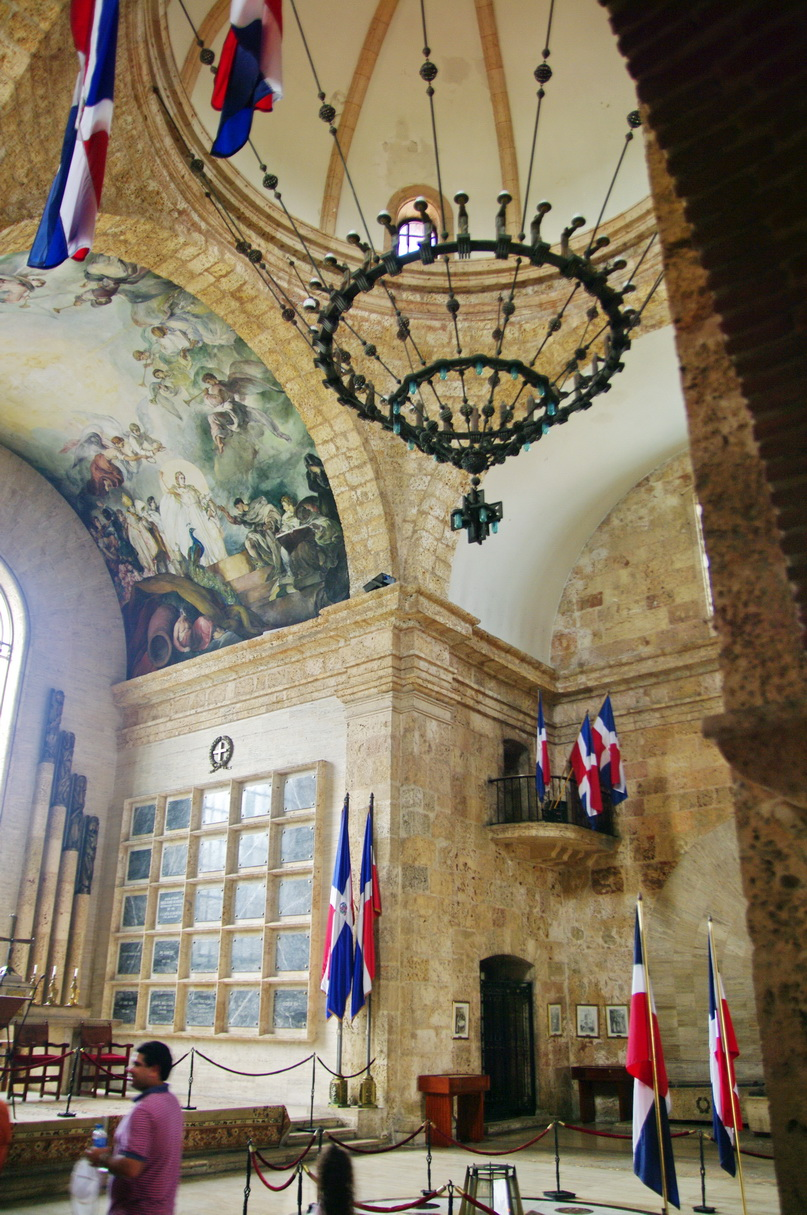
Dominican Republic national pantheon in Santo Domingo.

In the 1700s Santo Domingo's exports soared and the island's agricultural productivity rose. The population was bolstered by European emigration from the Canary Islands, resettling the northern part of the colony in the Cibao Valley. During this period, the privateers of Santo Domingo sailed into enemy ports looking for ships to attack, thus disrupting commerce between Spain's enemies in the Atlantic. Dominicans in the service of the Spanish Crown captured British, Dutch, French and Danish ships in the Caribbean Sea throughout the 18th century. The revenue acquired in these acts of piracy was invested in the economic expansion of the colony. Numerous captive Africans were also taken from enemy slave ships in West Indian waters. The population of Santo Domingo grew to approximately 125,000 in the year 1791. Of this number, 40,000 were white landowners, about 70,000 were of multiracial origin, and some 15,000 were black slaves.

From the start of the colonial period in the 1500s, miscegenation (mestizaje), intermixing of races particularly Spanish settlers, native Tainos, and imported Africans (free or enslaved), was very strong. In fact, colonial Santo Domingo had higher amount of mixing and lesser racial tensions in comparison to other colonies, even other Spanish colonies, this was due to the fact that for most of its colonial period, Santo Domingo was used as a military base where the majority of the Spanish settlers had an economy based on Cattle ranching, which was a far less labor-intensive than the more common plantation slavery at the time. By the 1700s, the majority of the population was mixed race, forming the basis of the Dominican ethnicity as a distinct people well before independence was achieved.

=== Independence ===
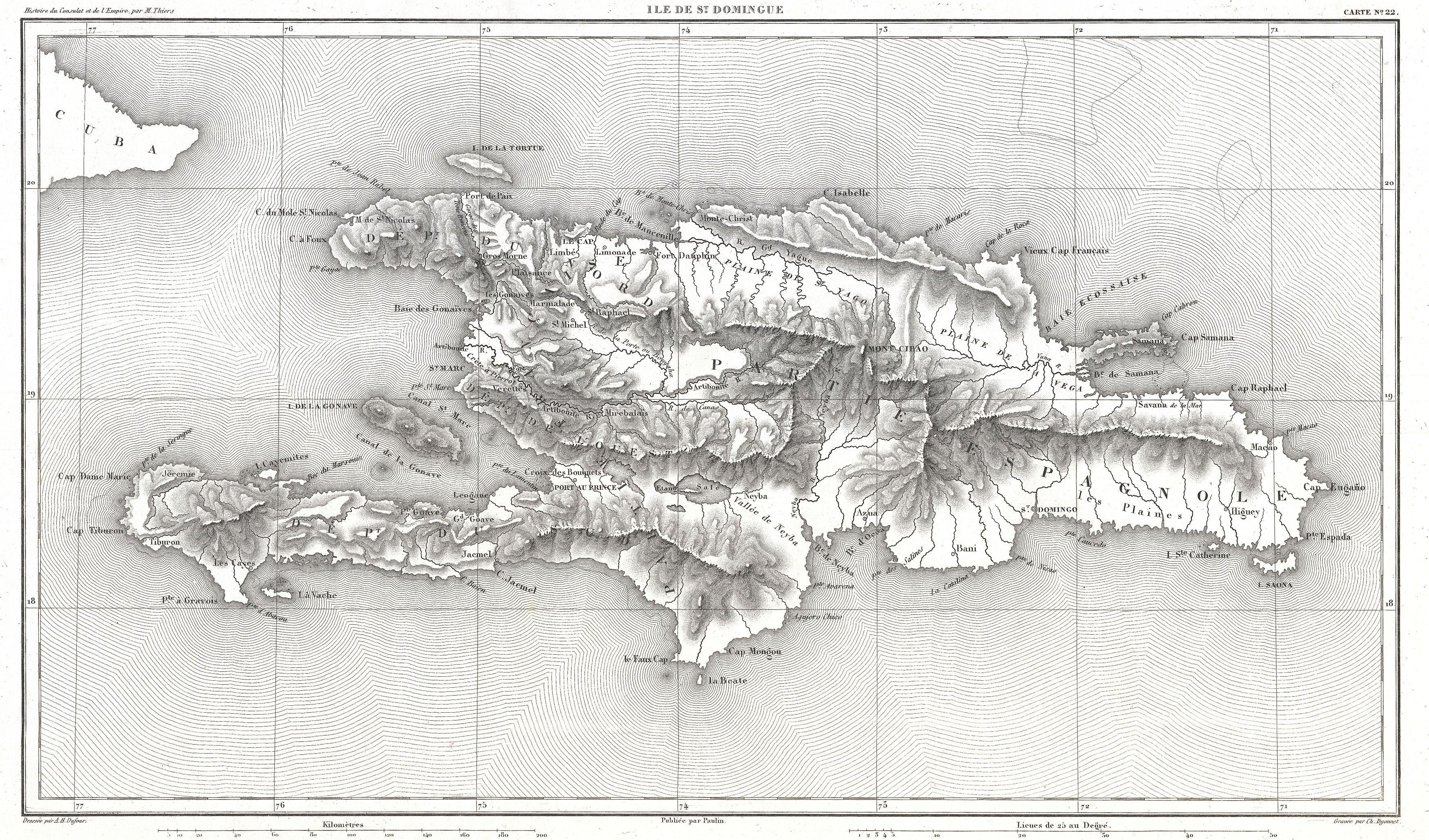
Map of the Dominican Republic and Haiti in 1859.

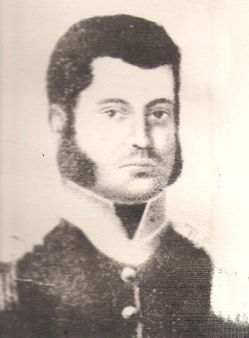
Juan Bautista Alfonseca an officer in the Dominican War of Independence who was credited for the early development of merengue, was of mixed race origins.

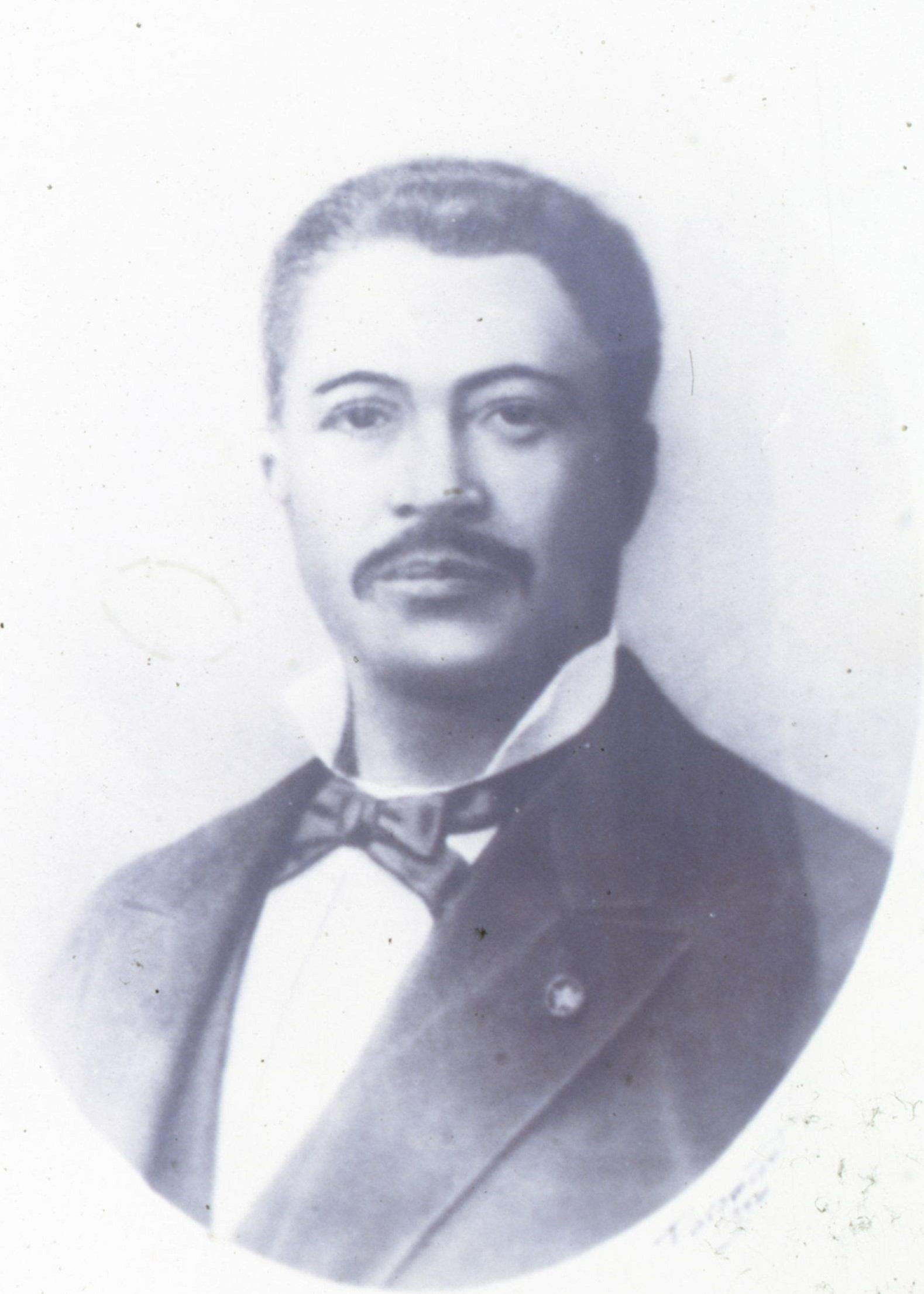
Gregorio Luperón, hero of the Dominican Restoration War, was of mulatto ancestry.

During the 1800s Dominicans were often at war, fighting the French, Haitians, Spanish, or amongst themselves, resulting in a society heavily influenced by military strongmen. Santo Domingo attained independence as the Dominican Republic in 1844. Dominican nationalists led an insurrection against the Haitians. On the morning of 27 February 1844, the gates of Santo Domingo rang with the shots of the plotters, who had emerged from their meetings to openly challenge the Haitians. Their efforts were successful, and for the next ten years, Dominican military strongmen fought to preserve their country's independence from the Haitian government. After ousting the Haitian occupying force from the country, Dominican nationalists fought against a series of attempted Haitian invasions that served to consolidate their independence from 1844 to 1856. Under the command of Faustin Soulouque Haitian soldiers tried to gain back control of lost territory, but this effort was to no avail as the Dominicans would go on to decisively win every battle henceforth. In March 1844, a 30,000-strong two-pronged attack by Haitians was successfully repelled by an under-equipped Dominican army under the command of the wealthy rancher Gen. Pedro Santana. Four years later, Dominican fleets attacked Haitian towns, and land reinforcements in the south to force the determined Haitian leader to concede. In the most thorough and intense encounter of all, Dominicans armed with swords sent Haitian troops into flight on all three fronts in 1855.

=== Post-colonial migrations ===
Mixed Dominicans 1920-2022
Year	Population	% of Dominican Rep.
1920	444,587	49.69%
1950	1,289,285	▲60.36%
1960	2,222,380	▲72.93%
2022	6,179,341	▼71.72%
Source: Dominican census

In the late 19th century and early 20th century there was an increase in country's population as many immigrants came from other Caribbean islands, including the Bahamas, Turks, Saint Kitts and Nevis, Dominica, Antigua, St. Vincent, Montserrat, Tortola, St. Croix, St. Thomas, Martinique, and Guadeloupe. They worked on sugarcane plantations and docks and settled mainly in the coastal areas of the country. The immigration of Cocolos began in the late 1800s with the rise and development of the sugar industry in the Dominican Republic. The first Turks and Caicos Islander immigrants began arriving in Puerto Plata after the Dominican War of Restoration, long before the modern sugar industry was established. When the railroad of Puerto Plata-Santiago was built in the late 19th century, many came from these islands to work on the railroad as well as others from Saint Thomas, which was then a Danish colony, they also settled in large numbers in Puerto Plata.

The majority of the immigrants that settled in the Dominican Republic in the 19th century and the first half of the 20th century established their residence in Santo Domingo, Santiago, Moca and Puerto Plata. Levantines (primarily from Lebanon and Syria) also settled in the country, working as agricultural laborers and merchants. Most immigrants intermixed with the local Dominican population, especially immigrants that came before 1980.

During the 19th century Puerto Plata was the most important port in the country (and even became provisional capital) and hosted the European and North American migration to the Dominican Republic. The majority were Germans traders and tobacco producers, most of them being from Hamburg and Bremen. There were also Englishmen, Dutch, Spaniards (mainly from Catalonia), Puerto Ricans (at least 30,000 between 1880 and 1940), Cubans (at least 5,000 immigrated during the Ten Years' War) and Italians. After the Restoration War there was an inflow of Americans and French. Most immigrants during this period completely assimilated into the local Dominican population.

More recently, there has been an increase of immigrants from Haiti, and to a lesser degree Venezuela, Cuba, Puerto Rico, among others due to the economic growth in Dominican Republic.

== Genetic ancestry and DNA testing ==
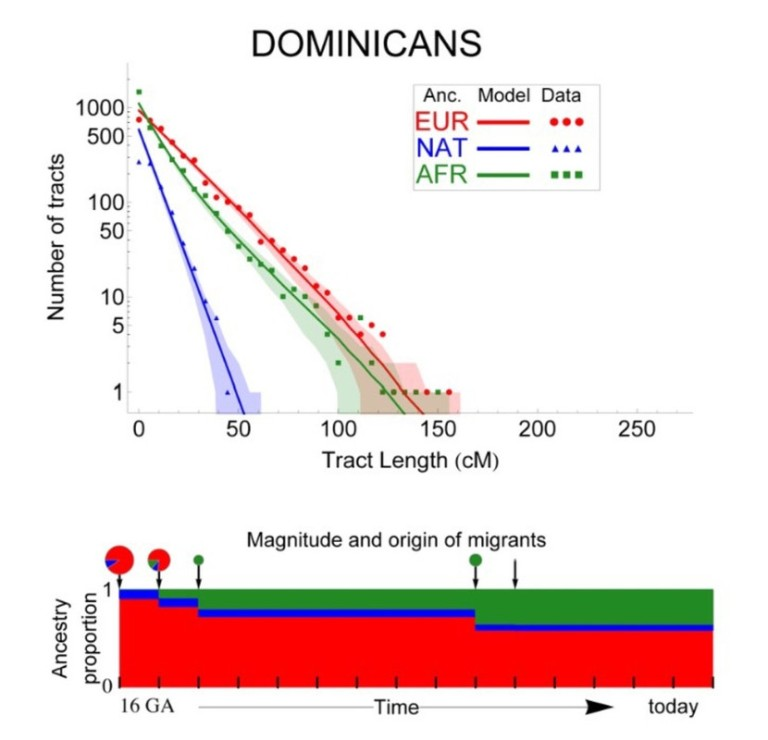
Timeline of the Dominican Republic's genetic make-up since 500 years ago showing the impact of migrations. The founder Dominican population was mostly European in origin with some Native Taíno element, but was modified by subsequent African inflows. European DNA Native American DNA Sub-Saharan African DNA

According to recent genealogical DNA studies of the Dominican population, the genetic makeup is predominantly European and Sub-Saharan African, with a lesser degree of Indigenous ancestry. The average DNA admixture of the founder Dominican population is 73% European, 10% Native, and 17% African.

The majority of Dominicans are a mix of Europeans and Africans, with lesser amounts of Indigenous blood, and they can accurately be described as "Mulatto" or "Tri-racial". Dominican Republic have several informal terms to loosely describe a person's degree of racial admixture, Mestizo means any type of mixed ancestry unlike in other Latin American countries it describes specifically a European/native mix, Indio describes mixed race people whose skin color is between white and black.

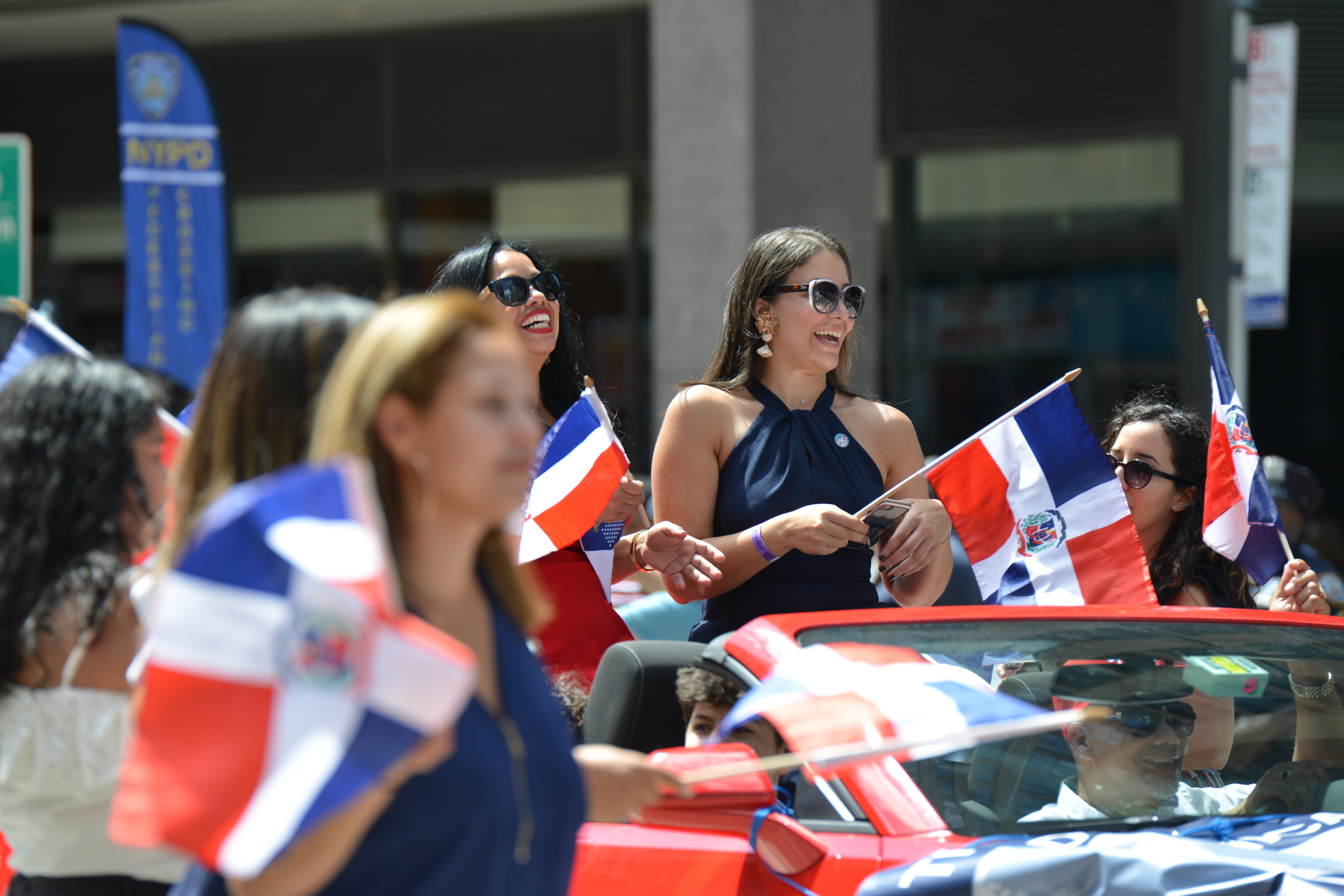
Dominicans in Dominican Day Parade 2019.

The majority of the Dominican population is tri-racial, with nearly all mixed race individuals having Taíno Indigenous ancestry along with European and African ancestry. European ancestry in the mixed population typically ranges between 50% and 60% on average, while African ancestry ranges between 30% and 40%, and the Native ancestry usually ranges between 5% and 10%. European and Native ancestry tends to be strongest in cities and towns of the north-central Cibao region, and generally in the mountainous interior of the country. African ancestry is strongest in coastal areas, the southeast plain, and the border regions.

In Dominican Republic and some other Latin American countries, it can sometimes be difficult to determine the exact number of racial groups, because the lines between whites and lighter multiracials are very blurry, which is also true between blacks and darker multiracials. As race in Dominican Republic acts as a continuum of white—mulatto—black and not as clear cut as in places like the United States. And many times in the same family, there can be people of different colors and racial phenotypes who are blood related, this is due to the large amounts of interracial mixing for hundreds of years in Dominican Republic and the Spanish Caribbean in general, allowing for high amounts of genetic diversity.

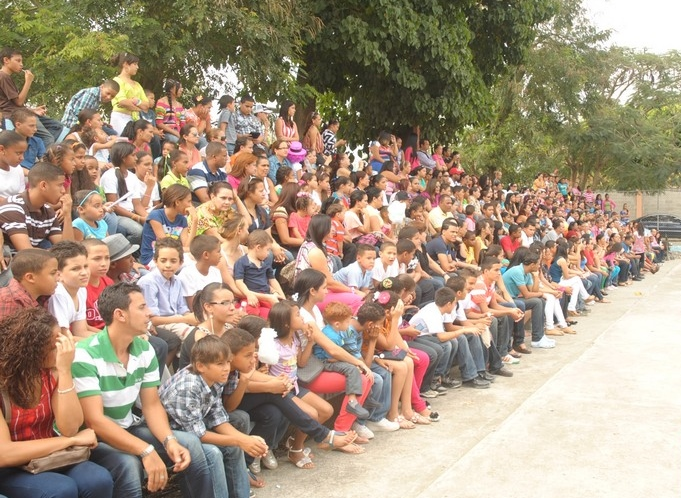
Dominican Republic people in the town of Moca.

Genetic ancestry of Dominican population
Study	Year	Caucasoid	SSA	Indigenous
Genome-wide patterns of population structure and admixture among Hispanic/Latino populations	2010	51%	42%	7%
Reconstructing the Population Genetic History of the Caribbean	2013	57%	35%	8%
Unravelling the hidden ancestry of American admixed populations	2015	52%	40%	8%
A continuum of admixture in the Western Hemisphere revealed by the African Diaspora genome	2016	52%	38%	9%
Admixture mapping of peripheral artery disease in a Dominican population reveals a putative risk locus on 2q35	2023	56%	37%	6%

Sources from Frontiers, date 5 March 2025, says that the genetic structure of the DR urban population cohort revealed that, in average, admixture estimates of individuals were 51.6%, 39.5%, and 8.9%, respectively, for European, African, and Indigenous ancestries.The proportions of European ancestry decreased progressively from self-reported White 63.2% (35.2%–81.9%), admixed 51.8% (25.5%–79.2%), to Black individuals 42.8% (20.0%–63.4%) (KW: European, p < 0.001). The opposite trend was observed regarding African ancestry, which averaged 27.5% (12. 2%–51.0%), 39.4% (14.1%–66.3%), and 48.6% (25.1%–74.7%), respectively, in White, admixed, and Black individuals (KW: African, p < 0.001). The average Indigenous ancestry was homogeneous among the groups: 9.3% (4.1%–38.1%), 8.9% (3.1%–25.0%), and 8.6% (3.8%–18.9%) (KW: Indigenous, p = 0.927). The African and European components explained 90.1% of genetic diversity in the sample; therefore, they should mostly determine the frequency distribution of SNVs with pharmacological relevance.

== Culture ==
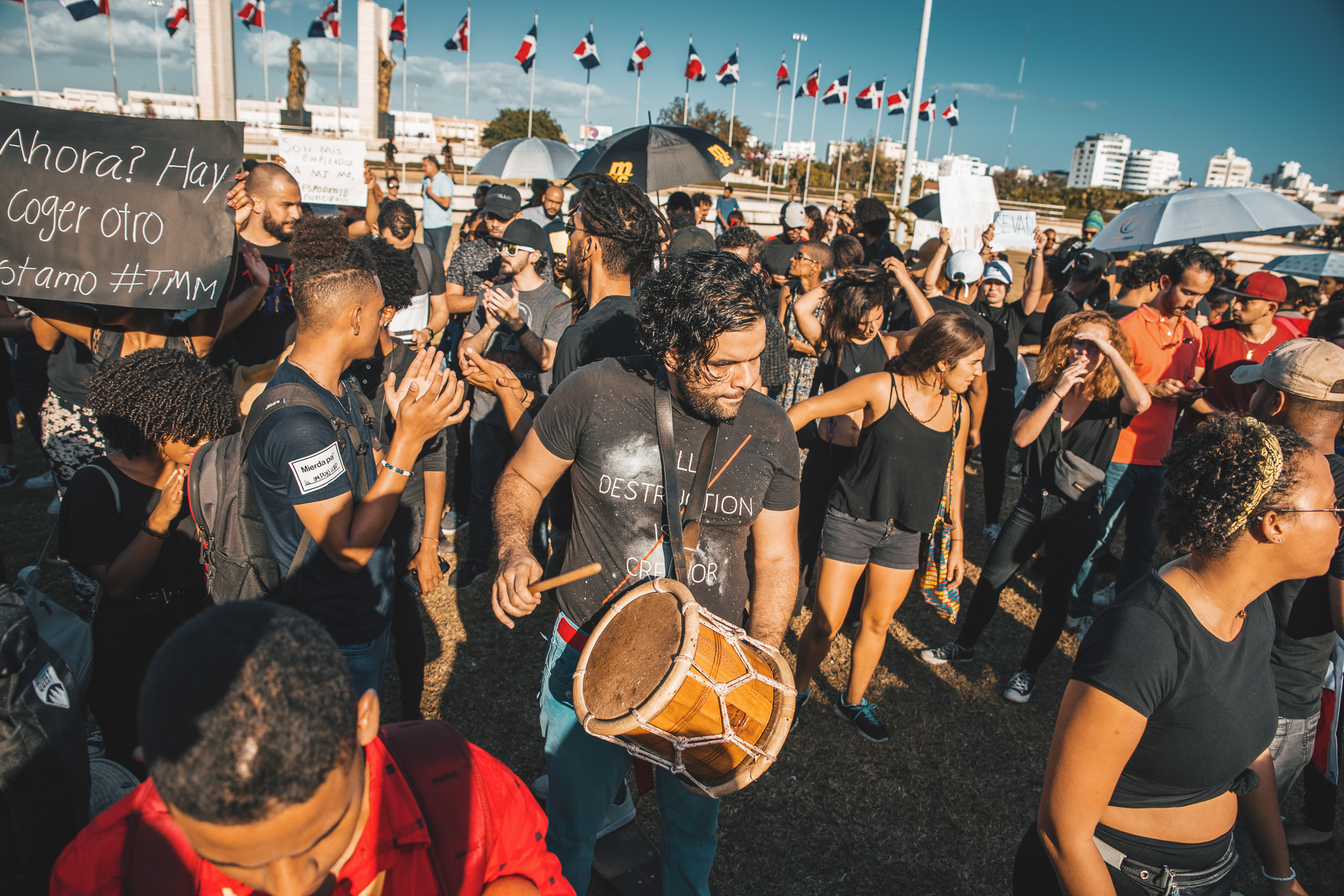
Dominicans protest in Santo Domingo city.

Carnival celebrations are held in the Dominican Republic each February with parades, street dancing, food festivals, and music. Festivities also take place in the week leading up to Easter Sunday. Parades, beauty pageants, and different festivals in each town throughout the country fill the week. In June the country celebrates Espíritu Santo to honor the island's multi-ethnic heritage with nationwide festivals featuring traditional music. Concerts, dance troupes, arts and crafts booths, and chefs also celebrate Dominican heritage with an annual cultural festival in Puerto Plata each June. Fiesta Patria de la Restauración, or Restoration Day, celebrates the Dominican Republic's day of independence from Spain, which occurred in 1863. Nationwide events include parades, music festivals, street festivals, and food festivals.

== Sports ==
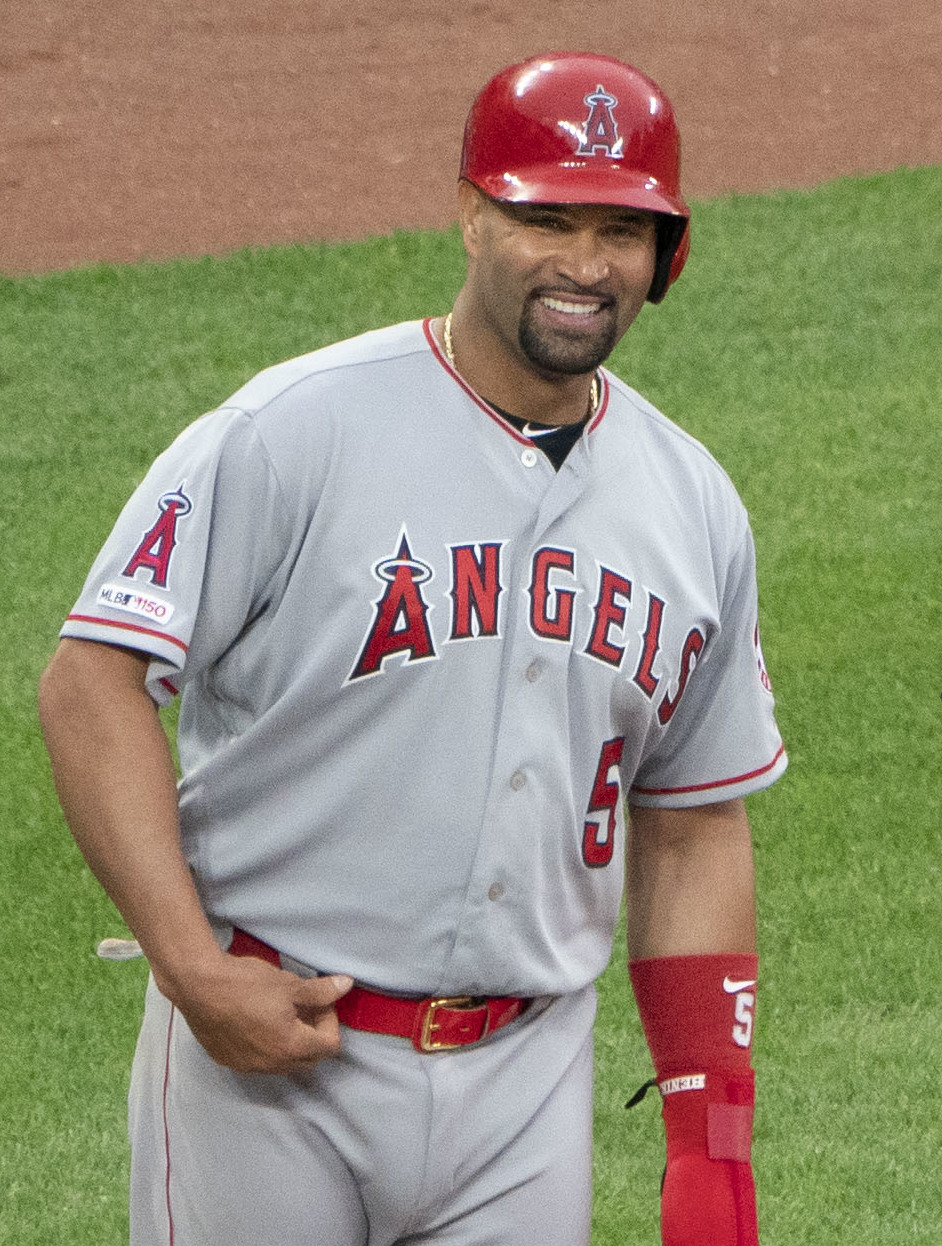
Dominican Major League Baseball player Albert Pujols.

Baseball is by far the most popular sport in the Dominican Republic. After the United States, the Dominican Republic has the second-highest number of Major League Baseball (MLB) players. Ozzie Virgil, Sr. became the first Dominican-born player in the MLB on September 23, 1956. Juan Marichal is the first Dominican-born player in the Baseball Hall of Fame.

== See also ==
- Dominican American
- List of Dominican Americans
- Dominicans in Spain
- Culture of the Dominican Republic
- Demographics of the Dominican Republic
- History of the Dominican Republic
- White Dominicans
