= National Statistics Office (Dominican Republic) =

Government statistical agency of the Dominican Republic

- Oficina Nacional de Estadística (Spanish); ONE

Agency overview
- Formed: 1 November 1935; 91 years ago
- Jurisdiction: Dominican Republic
- Headquarters: 18°28′31″N 69°54′22″W Edificio de Oficinas Gubernamentales Juan Pablo Duarte, Avenida México, esquina Avenida Leopoldo Navarro 419, piso 9, Gascue, Santo Domingo, Distrito Nacional, 10201, Dominican Republic
- Agency executive: Mildred Martínez
- Parent agency: Ministry of Finance and Economy
- Key document: Law No. 5096-59 (in Spanish)
- Website: www.one.gob.do (in Spanish)

The National Statistics Office (Spanish: Oficina Nacional de Estadística, ONE) of the Dominican Republic is the government institution in charge of collecting, reviewing, preparing and publishing national statistics on the economy, agricultural production, commerce, industry, finance, environment, society and demography. It also has the task of carrying out the national population and housing censuses. It is part of the Ministry of Finance and Economy.

The first national census was conducted in 1920.

== Previous censuses ==
- 1920 Santo Domingo census
- 1950 Dominican Republic census
- 1960 Dominican Republic census
- 1970 Dominican Republic census
- 2010 Dominican Republic census
- 2022 Dominican Republic Census
