= Artajo =

Artajo is a Spanish surname. Notable people with the surname include:

- Alberto Martín-Artajo (1905–1979), Spanish politician
- Jorge Artajo (born 1952), Spanish artist, writer, performer, and social activist
