= White Dominicans =

Dominicans of European descent

Dominicanos blancos (Spanish)
- Flag of the First Dominican Republic

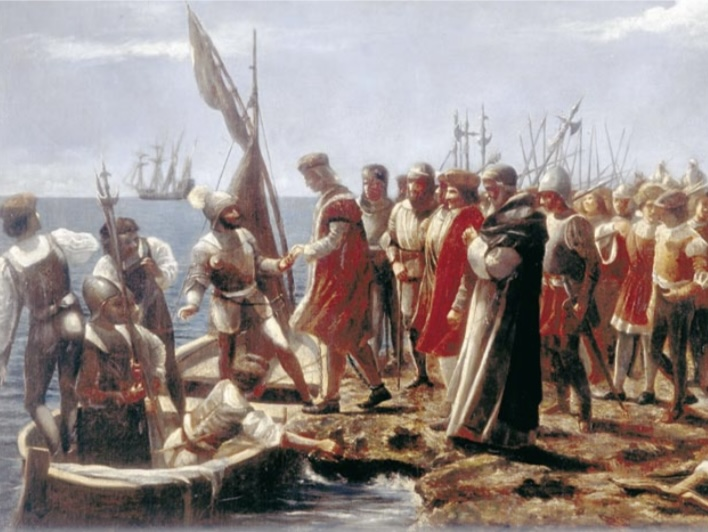
- Arrival of Christopher Columbus, art by Dominican painter Luis Desangles.

Total population
- White ancestry predominates ▲1,611,752 (2022 census) ▲18.70% of the Dominican population (Only 12 years and older)

Regions with significant populations
- Región Ozama: 546,011
- Región Cibao Norte: 346,696
- Región Cibao Sur: 162,303
- Región Cibao Nordeste: 112,616
- Región Valdesia: 103,591
- Región Cibao Noroeste: 79,999

Languages
- Spanish, Frespañol

Religion
- Christianity

Related ethnic groups
- White Cubans, White Puerto Ricans, Spaniards (Andalusians and Canary Islanders)

White Dominicans (Spanish: Dominicanos blancos), also known as Caucasian Dominicans (Spanish: Dominicanos caucásicos), are Dominicans of full or near full White European or West Asian ancestry. The 2022 Dominican Republic census reported that 1,611,752 people or 18.7% of those 12 years old and above are white, 731,855 males and 879,897 females. An estimate put it at 17.8% of the Dominican Republic's population, according to a 2021 survey by the United Nations Population Fund.

The majority of white Dominicans have ancestry from the first European settlers to arrive in Hispaniola in 1492 and are descendants of the Spanish and Portuguese who settled in the island during colonial times, as well as the French who settled in the 17th and 18th centuries. Many whites in the Dominican Republic also descend from Italians, Dutchmen, Germans, Hungarians, Scandinavians, Americans and other nationalities who have migrated between the 19th and 20th centuries. About 9.2% of the Dominican population claims a European immigrant background, according to the 2021 Fondo de Población de las Naciones Unidas survey.

White Dominicans historically made up a larger percentage in the Captaincy General of Santo Domingo and for a time were the single largest ethnic group prior to the 19th century. Similar to the rest of the Hispanic Caribbean, the majority of Spaniards who settled the Dominican Republic came from southern Spain, Andalusia and the Canary Islands, with some Castilian and Catalan immigration.

== Population ==
The 1750 estimates show that there were 30,863 whites, or 43.7% out of a total population of 70,625, in the colony of Santo Domingo. other estimates include 1790 with 40,000 or 32% of the population, and in 1846 with 80,000 or 48.5% of the population.

The first census of 1920 reported that 24.9% identified as white. The second census, taken in 1935, covered race, religion, literacy, nationality, labor force, and urban–rural residence. The census bureau continued to gather data on ethnic-racial identification until 1960, discontinuing its use of classifications until 2022. The most recent census in 2022 reported that 1,611,752 or 18.7% of Dominicans 12 years old and above are white.

White Dominicans 1920-2022
| Year | Population | % | Ref(s) |
|---|---|---|---|
| 1920 | 223,144 | 24.94 | |
| 1935 | 192,732 | ▼13.0 | |
| 1950 | 600,994 | ▲28.14 | |
| 1960 | 489,580 | ▼16.08 | |
| 2022 | 1,611,752 | ▲18.70 | |

The Dominican identity card (issued by the Junta Central Electoral) used to categorised people as native, white, black and yellow , in 2011 the Junta planned to replace Indian with mulatto in a new ID card with biometric data that was under development, but in 2014 when it released the new ID card, it decided to just drop racial categorisation, the old ID card expired on 10 January 2015. The Ministry of Public Works and Communications uses racial classification in the driver's license, being white, mestizo, mulatto, black, and yellow the categories used.

== History ==
=== Conquest and settlement ===
The presence of whites in the Dominican Republic dates back to the founding of La Isabela, one of the first European settlements in the Americas, by Bartholomew Columbus in 1493. The presence of precious metals such as gold boosted migration of thousands of Spaniards to Hispaniola seeking easy wealth. They tried to enslave the Taíno, but many of these died of diseases, and those who survived did not make good slaves.

In 1510, there were 10,000 Spaniards in the colony of Santo Domingo, and it rose to over 20,000 in 1520. But following the depleting of the gold mines, the island began to depopulate, as most poor Spanish colonists embarked to the newly conquered Mexico or to Venezuela (which was aggravated by the conquest of Peru in 1533). This was followed by a limited Spanish migration toward Hispaniola, composed overwhelmingly by males. In order to counteract the depopulation and impoverishment of the colony, the Spanish Monarchy allowed the importation of African slaves to hew sugar cane.

By 1542 there were only few hundred natives. Several epidemics wiped out the remaining natives on the island.

The shortage of Spanish females led to miscegenation, that drove the creation of a caste system, (casta), in which Spaniards were at the top, mixed-race people at middle, and Amerindians and black people at the bottom. Endogamy became a norm within the higher classes, in order to maintain their status and remain racially pure especially, specially because only pure whites were able to inherit majorats. As a result, Santo Domingo, like the rest of Hispanic America, became a pigmentocracy. The local-born whites were known as blancos de la tierra ("whites from the land"), in contrast to the blancos de Castilla, "whites from Castile".

The color prejudice between blacks and whites practically disappeared due to the great misery that prevailed in the colony.

By the mid-17th century, the overall population decreased to 3,000 inhabitants and it was concentrated in or near the city of Santo Domingo. About one tenth of the colony's population was Portuguese-born; they were concentrated in the Cibao valley, where they had an influence on the Spanish dialect spoken in that area; another 3% was born in Spain or descended exclusively from Spaniards.

==== 18th century ====
During the eighteenth century, there were French colonists that settled in many Spanish towns, particularly in Santiago, by 1730 they totalled 25% of the population. This was seen as a problem for the Spanish authorities, because if the population became mostly French, there could be problems of loyalty toward Spain.

In 1718 a Royal Decree ordered the expulsion of the French people from Santo Domingo. The Grand Mayor of Santiago, Antonio Pichardo Vinuesta, refused to obey the decree arguing that most of the Frenchmen had married local women and that their expulsion would damage the economy of the Cibao. Grand Mayor Pichardo was tried and imprisoned in the city of Santo Domingo, but in the next year, the Council of the Indies reasoned in favor of Pichardo and decided a pardon to the French. In 1720–1721, a revolt in Santiago against a new tax on beef exports to the Saint Domingue, arose Frenchification fears in the Santo Domingo elite; Captain-General Fernando Constanzo, governor of the Santo Domingo, accused the Cibaenian elite of seeking to annex their province to France.

After the failed plans of the Spanish Monarchy to expel the French colonists, the Monarchy decided to actively encourage the mass settlement of Spanish families in order to counteract the Frenchification of the colony. Over the next decades, the Spanish colony of Santo Domingo was the subject of a mass migration of Spaniards, most of whom came from the Canary Islands.

During that period, Neyba (1733), San Juan de la Maguana (1733), Puerto Plata (1736), Dajabón (1743), Montecristi (1751), Santa Bárbara de Xamaná (1756), San Rafael de la Angostura (1761), Sabana de la Mar (1761), Las Caobas (1763), Baní (1764), Las Matas de Farfán (1767), San Miguel de la Atalaya (1768), Moca (1773), Juana Núñez (1775), San José de los Llanos (1779), San Pedro de Macorís (1779), and San Carlos de Tenerife (1785), were founded. Due to this migration, it decreased the amount of coloreds and blacks: the black population dropped to 12%, the mulatto population to 8%, and the quadroons to 31%.

After that peak, the local white population began to migrate (especially towards Puerto Rico, Curaçao and Venezuela), first with the Haitian rule, and later with the constant political and economic instability after Dominican independence. Historically, migration to Puerto Rico was constant (except between 1898 and the 1930s, when there was a wave of Puerto Rican migrants to the Dominican Republic) and it boosted in the 20th century because of the oppressive regimes of Trujillo and Balaguer. Although, the country has received a tiny but steady immigration (from other countries than Haiti), which has partly offset the constant emigration.

=== Dominican War of Independence ===
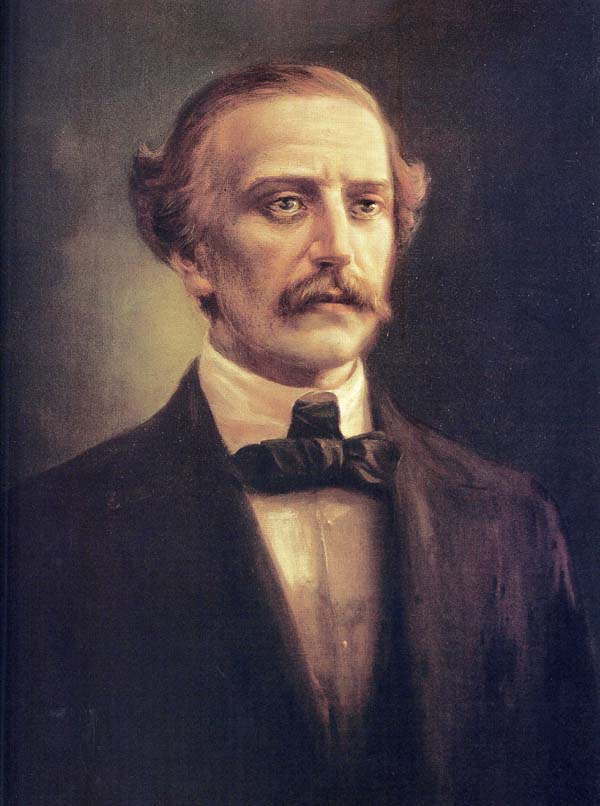
Juan Pablo Duarte, of Spanish descent, was the foremost of the founding fathers in the Dominican Republic.

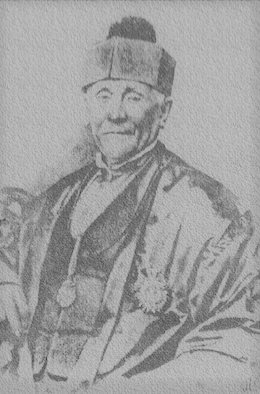
Tomás Bobadilla, a key proponent of the independence period, of full European descent.

The Haitian Occupation of Santo Domingo lasted from 1822 until 1844, and sometime during this span, a totalitarian military government took place that forbade the Dominican people by law from taking public office, were on permanent curfew since early dusk and had the public university closed down on the pretext that it was a subversive institution.

In 1838 Dominican nationalists Juan Pablo Duarte, Francisco del Rosario Sánchez, Matías Ramón Mella established the Trinitario movement. In 1844, the members chose El Conde, the prominent “Gate of the Count” in the old city walls, as a rallying point for their insurrection against the Haitian government. On the morning of 27 February 1844, El Conde rang with the shots of the plotters, who had emerged from their secret meetings to openly challenge the Haitians. Their efforts were successful, and for the next ten years, Dominican military strongmen fought to preserve their country's independence against the Haitian government.

Under the command of Faustin Soulouque Haitian soldiers tried to gain back control of lost territory, but this effort was to no avail as the Dominicans would go on to decisively win every battle henceforth. In March 1844, a 30,000-strong two-pronged attack by Haitians was successfully repelled by an under-equipped Dominican army under the command of the wealthy rancher Gen. Pedro Santana. Four years later, it took a Dominican flotilla harassing Haitian coastal villages, and land reinforcements in the south to force Haitian emperor into a one-year truce. In the most thorough and intense encounter of all, Dominicans armed with swords sent Haitian troops into flight on all three fronts in 1855 solidifying the Dominican nation's independence.

=== Emigration ===
Due to political instability during the España Boba period, some of the whites in Santo Domingo fled the country between 1795 and 1820, mainly to Venezuela, Puerto Rico, and Cuba. However, many white families stayed on the island. Many whites in Santo Domingo did not consider owning slaves due to the economic crisis in Santo Domingo. But the few rich white elites that did, fled the colony. Many of these white families that stayed on the island settled in the cibao region owning land. Some Dominican historians and intellectuals, such as Américo Lugo, Joaquín Balaguer and Antonio del Monte y Tejada, deplored that "Santo Domingo lost most of its best families" at that era, specially during the Haitian domination. After independence and being under Spanish control again in 1863, many families returned to the island including new waves of immigration from Spain occurred.

=== Post-independence immigration ===
The majority of the immigrants that settled in the Dominican Republic in the 19th century and the first half of the 20th century established their residence in Santo Domingo, Santiago, Moca and Puerto Plata.

During the 19th century Puerto Plata was the most important port in the country (and even became provisional capital) and hosted the European and North American migration to the Dominican Republic. The majority were Germans traders and tobacco producers, most of them being from Hamburg and Bremen. There were also Englishmen, Dutch, Spaniards (mainly from Catalonia) and Italians. After the Restoration War there was an inflow of Americans and French. Most immigrants during this period completely assimilated into the local Dominican population. The most prominent migrants' surnames that went to this city were Arzeno, Balaguer, Batlle, Bonarelli, Brugal, Capriles, Demorizi, Ferrari, Imbert, Lithgow, Lockward, McKinney, Paiewonsky, Prud'homme, Puig, Rainiere, Villanueva, Vinelli and Zeller. In 1871, half of Puerto Plata's population was composed of foreigners; and in both the 1888 and 1897 censuses, 30% was foreign born.

Most of the offspring of Puerto Plata's immigrants moved to Santiago and Santo Domingo in the 20th century.

== Geographic distribution ==
The distribution of white Dominicans or European descended population is the Cibao or Northern region, particularly the Sierra (Note: The Cibao Sierra or La Sierra is a geographic and ethnocultural area composed by the province of Santiago Rodríguez and the highlands of the Santiago province: the municipalities of Jánico, Sabana Iglesia, and San José de las Matas (Sajoma).) such as composed by the province of Santiago Rodríguez and the highlands of the Santiago province. The 2022 Dominican census reported that 1,611,752 people or 18.7% of those 12 years old and above identify as white, 731,855 males and 879,897 females. Previously in 1950 these areas showed that six out of ten people identified as white. The Southeastern and Southwestern regions have smaller concentrations of whites in comparison to the North with the exception of the city of Santo Domingo.

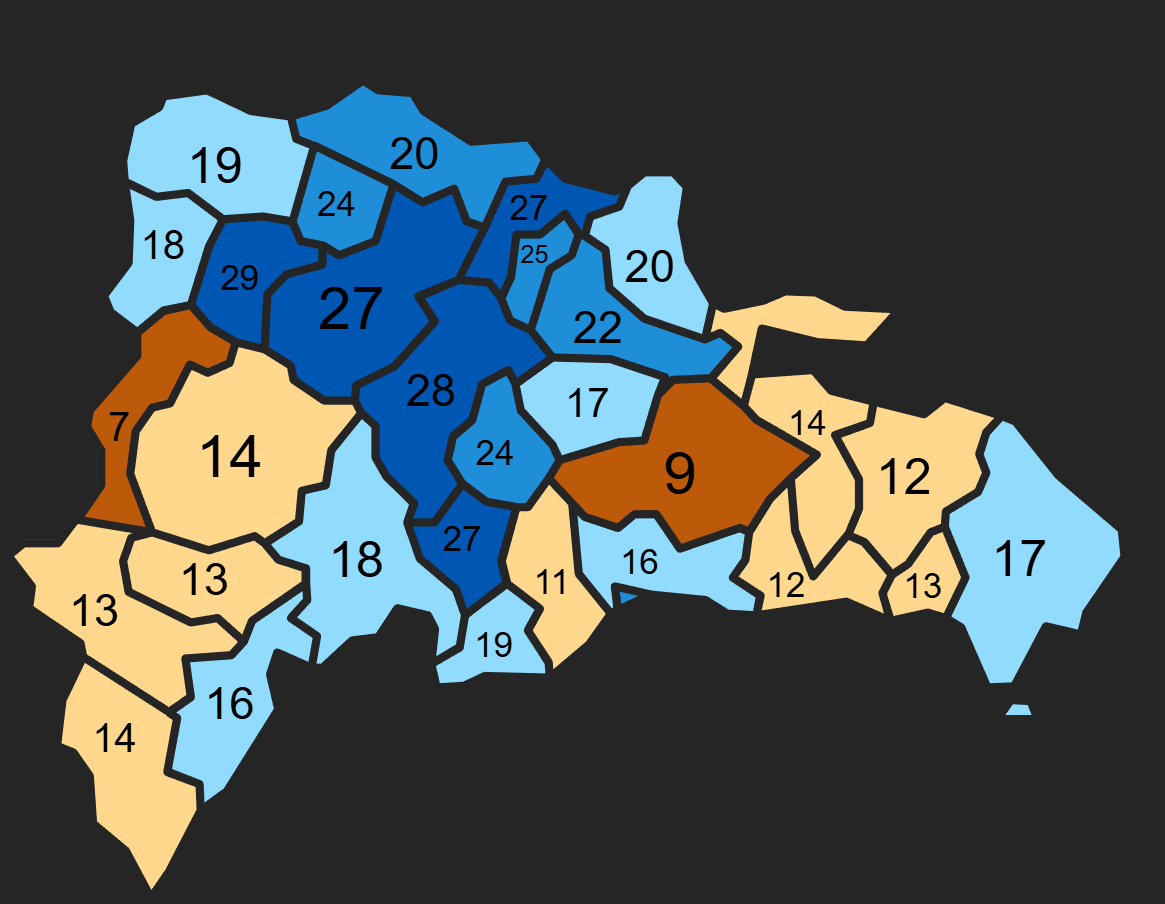
Percentage (%) of White Dominicans by province (2022 census).

The Sierra was populated in the 18th century mostly by ethnic Canarians and French who established a markedly endogamous society where they didn't miscegenate with mulattos or blacks in order to preserve their whiteness; African slaves were negligible except in San José de las Matas, where today there is a large admixed population. The Sierra received a sizeable amount of white and mulatto refugees from both Saint-Domingue (Haiti), and the Cibao Valley, the former during the Haitian Revolution and the latter amid the Dominican genocide by the Haitian army in 1805.

The 2022 census results for the population aged 12 years and above shows the distribution of the white population in each province. National Statistics Office.

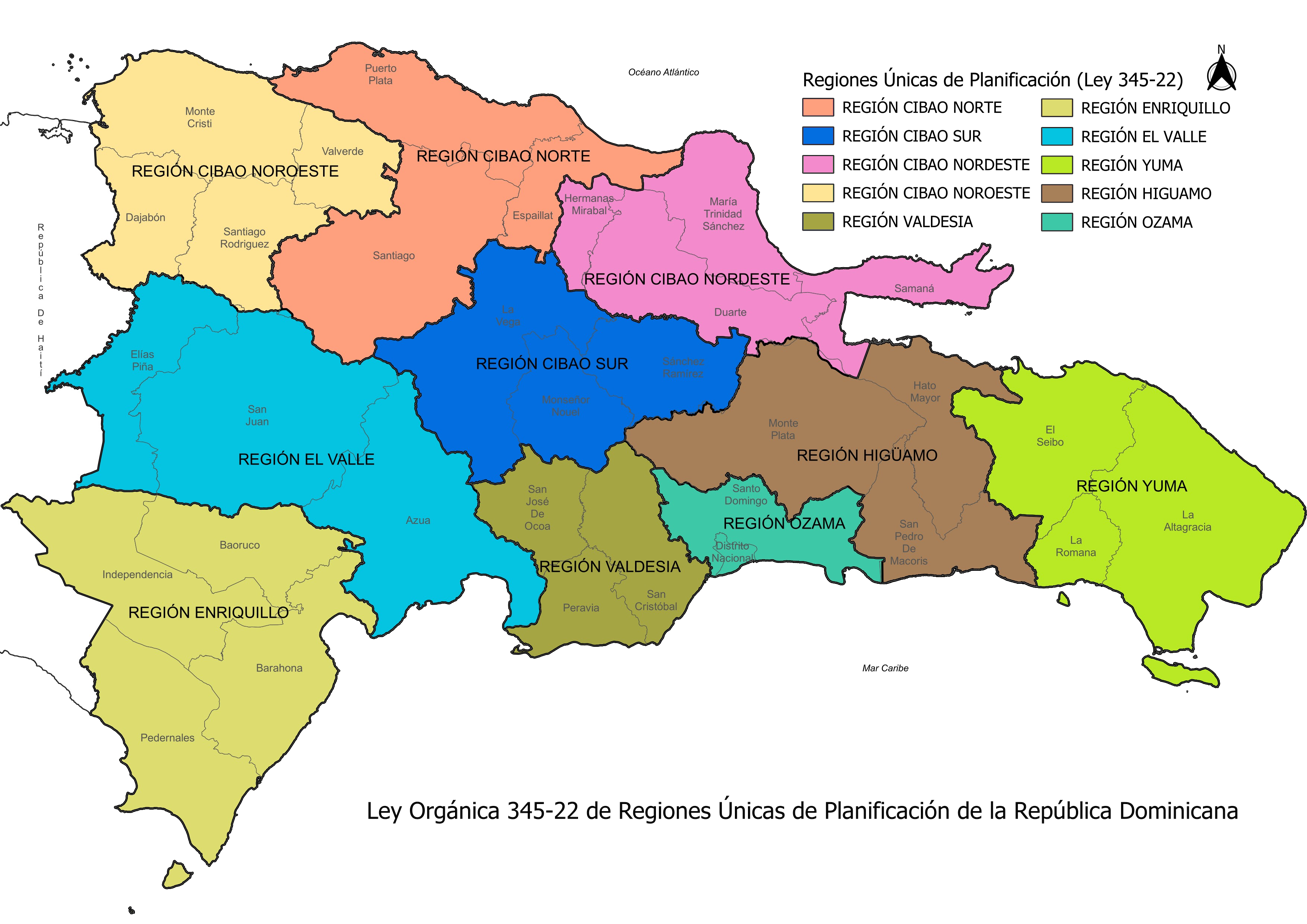
Provinces of the Dominican Republic.

| Province | Population | White (%) |
|---|---|---|
| Distrito Nacional | 199,442 | 23.51 |
| Santo Domingo | 346,569 | 15.79 |
| Espaillat | 53,497 | 26.87 |
| Puerto Plata | 56,072 | 20.16 |
| Santiago | 237,127 | 26.95 |
| La Vega | 102,324 | 28.36 |
| Sánchez Ramírez | 22,156 | 16.87 |
| Monseñor Nouel | 37,823 | 24.21 |
| Duarte | 55,574 | 22.04 |
| María Trinidad Sánchez | 25,287 | 19.94 |
| Hermanas Mirabal | 19,953 | 24.90 |
| Samaná | 11,802 | 12.97 |
| Dajabón | 10,710 | 18.47 |
| Monte Cristi | 18,573 | 18.69 |
| Santiago Rodríguez | 15,076 | 28.74 |
| Valverde | 35,640 | 24.13 |
| Peravia | 30,852 | 18.75 |
| San Cristóbal | 57,616 | 10.75 |
| San José de Ocoa | 15,123 | 26.80 |
| Baoruco | 10,890 | 12.99 |
| Barahona | 23,990 | 15.62 |
| Independencia | 6,014 | 13.08 |
| Pedernales | 3,475 | 13.69 |
| Azua | 33,908 | 18.01 |
| Elías Piña | 3,759 | 7.96 |
| San Juan | 27,205 | 14.13 |
| El Seibo | 9,174 | 11.72 |
| La Altagracia | 56,942 | 16.09 |
| La Romana | 29,451 | 12.95 |
| San Pedro de Macorís | 31,223 | 11.69 |
| Monte Plata | 13,661 | 8.54 |
| Hato Mayor | 10,844 | 13.65 |
| Dominican Republic | 1,611,752 | 18.7% |

== Modern era migration ==
In the modern era, there are sizeable numbers of immigrants settling in the Dominican Republic from North America and Europe, especially countries like Spain, Italy, France, United States, and Canada, among others.

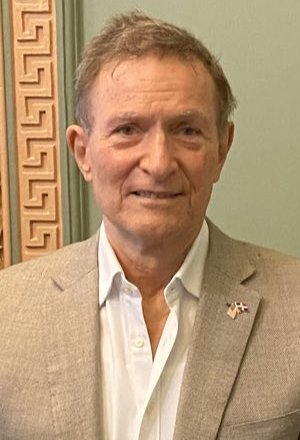
Roberto Álvarez became Foreign Minister in 2020.

The Puerto Rican population in the Dominican Republic has been steadily climbing recently, and the country now has a large and fast growing Venezuelan population, of which whom make up the second largest immigrant group in Dominican Republic after Haitians.

== Social status ==
The Dominican Republic is similar to other countries in Latin America that were colonized by Europeans, and shows a clear correlation between race and wealth. The upper and upper-middle classes of the Dominican Republic are overwhelmingly of European origin.

The middle class, which is the class with the broadest colour spectrum, is roughly ⅓ white. Altogether, about 45% of the lower-middle, upper-middle and upper class Dominicans are white, with mixed-race Dominicans reaching a similar proportion.

The lower class is overwhelmingly of mixed-race background.

=== Establishment of a European elite ===
Limpieza de sangre (Spanish: [limˈpjeθa ðe ˈsaŋɡɾe], meaning literally "cleanliness of blood") was very important in Mediæval Spain, and this system was replicated on the New World. The highest social class was the Visigothic nobility of Central European origin, commonly known as people of "sangre azul" (Spanish for: "blue blood"), because their skin was so pale that their veins looked blue through it, in comparison with that of a commoner who had olive skin. Those who proved that they were descendants of Visigoths were allowed to use the style of Don and were considered hidalgos. Hidalgos nobles were the most benefited of those Spanish who emigrated to America because they received royal properties (such as cattle, lands, and slaves) and tax exemptions. These people achieved a privileged position, and most of them avoided mixing with natives or Africans. This led to certain family names to be related both to whiteness, as with a better social-economic position; these family names were Angulo, Aybar, Bardecí, Bastidas, Benavides, Caballero, Cabral, Camarena, Campusano, Caro, Coca, Coronado, Dávila, De Castro, De la Concha, De la Rocha, Del Monte, Fernández de Castro, Fernández de Fuenmayor, Fernández de Oviedo, Frómesta, Garay, Guzmán, Heredia, Herrera, Jiménez (and its variant Jimenes), Jover, Landeche, Lora, Leoz y Echálaz, Machado, Maldonado, Mieses, Monasterios, Mosquera, Nieto, Ovalle, Palomares, Paredes, Pérez, Pichardo, Pimentel, Quesada, Serrano, Solano, Vega, and Villoria.

The Spanish of the highest rank who migrated to America in the sixteenth century was the noblewoman Doña María Álvarez de Toledo y Rojas, granddaughter of the 1st Duke of Alba, niece of the 2nd Duke of Alba, and grandniece of King Ferdinand of Aragon; she was married to Diego Columbus, Admiral and Viceroy of the Indies.

Many Criollo families migrated to other Spanish colonies.

Further immigration from the 17th and 18th centuries made subsequently that newly rich families emerged among them, which are: Alfau, De Marchena, Mirabal, Tavárez (and its variants Tavares and Taveras), Lopez-Penha, Machado, Marten-Ellis and Troncoso.
And others from the 19th and 20th centuries: Armenteros, Arzeno, Báez, Barceló, Beras, Bermúdez, Bonetti, Brugal, Corripio, Dalmau, Esteva, Goico, Haché, Hoffiz, Lama, León, Morel, Munné, Ottenwalder, Pellerano, Paiewonski, Piantini, Rochet, Rizek, Vicini, Vila,Vitienes, Lluberes, Borjas, Gonzalez, Feris, Pimentel, Zeller, Cascella, Ginebra, Cruz, Marrero, Pellicice, Ross, Ramos, Brache, Ravelo, Prazmoski, Ariza, Farach, Batlle, Carbuccia, Betances, Antun, Varona, Fiallo, Peynado, Matos, Pacheco, Viyella, Kallaf, Lamarche, Paniagua, Toribio, Chotin, Herrera, Nader, Aguayo, Beauchamps, Elias, Melo, Tejera, Lomba, Suarez, Elmudesi, Fortuna, Purcell, Lovaton, Leroux, Lehoux, Freixas, Acra, Urgal, Castillo, Yunen, Bonilla, Morales, Marra, Checo, Gutierrez, Marchena, Kury, Kourrie, Mera, Puig, Selman, Seliman, Imbert, Queipo, Caro, Canaan, Rannik, Alba, Evertz, Bogaret, Roig, Sebelen, Schad, Caceres, Aybar, Carias, Hoyo, Martinez Lima, Hazoury, Cabral, Nadal, Bisono, Turull, Ochoa, Paliza, Miyar, Barkhausen, Sanz, Grullon, Marti, Azar, Saviñon, Inchaustegui, Casanova, Gautreau, Grateraeux, De Moya, Dorrejo, Rainieri, Menicucci, Marranzini, Estrella, Cuadra, Pou, Del Rio, Valera, Bonarelli, Mejia, Rivera, and Reid.”

== Notable White Dominicans ==
- Nancy Alvarez – Singer, television personality, and psychologist
- Mary Joe Fernández – Pro tennis player
- Charytín Goyco – Actress, singer, comedian, and TV hostess
- Juan Luis Guerra – Merengue musician, composer, and record producer
- José Guillermo Cortines – Actor and singer
- Salvador Jorge Blanco – Politician, lawyer, and writer. President between 1982–1986
- Gilda Jovine – Model and beauty pageant holder
- Carlos de la Mota – Actor, singer, and architect
- Dulcita Lieggi – Actress and model
- Maria Montez – Actress who gained fame and popularity in the 1940s
- Amelia Vega – Actress and model
- Antonio Guzmán – President from 1978-1982
- Juan Pablo Duarte - Founding father of the Dominican Republic
- Matias Ramon Mella - Founding father of the Dominican Republic
- Antonio Imbert Barrera - Dominican Army Major General
- Oscar de la Renta - Dominican fashion designer
- Juan Bosch - Dominican president and politician
- Tomas Bobadilla y Briones - Dominican politician

== See also ==
- Criollo people
- Isleños
- White Hispanic and Latino Americans
- Dominican people
- Afro-Dominicans
- Spanish diaspora
- European emigration
- History of the Jews in the Dominican Republic
- Mixed Dominicans
- Racism in the Dominican Republic
- Italian Dominicans
- White Puerto Ricans
- White Haitians
