= Gabriela Reyes Fuchs =

Mexican multidisciplinary artist

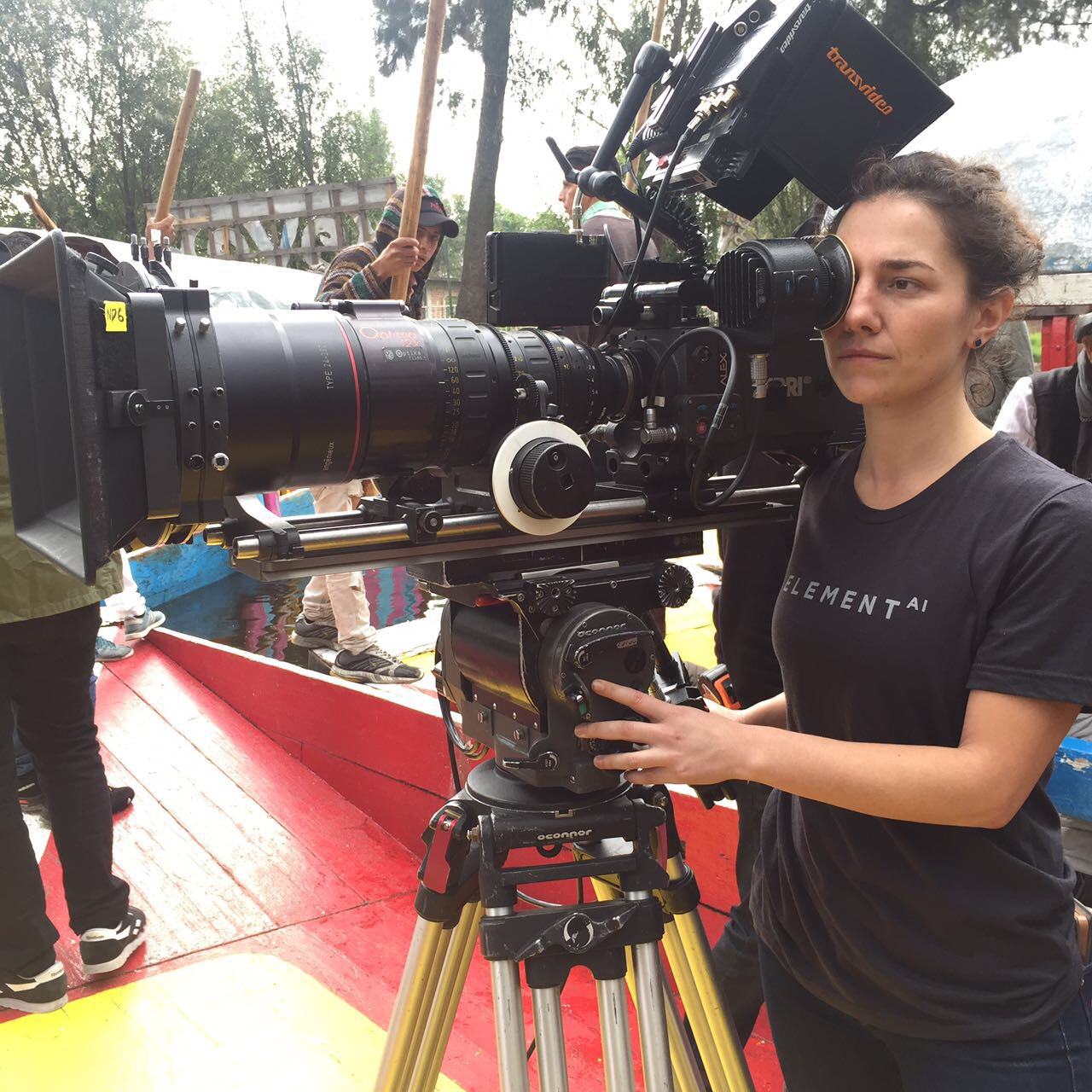
- Fuchs on set, July 2017.
- Born: Carmen Gabriela Reyes Fuchs; 18 April 1986 (age 39); Mexico City, Mexico
- Education: Panamerican School
- Alma mater: Escuela Activa de Fotografía
- Occupations: Cinematographer, inventor, artist
- Known for: Dead Soon, Innerstela, El Rey Netflix Series, L-Pop Disney+ Series
- Parent(s): Anselmo Reyes Gallardo, Carmen Patricia Fuchs Gómez
- Website: www.innerstela.com www.gabrielareyesfuchs.com

Gabriela Reyes Fuchs (born Carmen Gabriela Reyes Fuchs; April 18, 1986) is a Mexican cinematographer, photographer, artist, and inventor. She is best known as the founder of Innerstela, a project that captures images reminiscent of interstellar nebulae when photographing the ashes of the deceased. She owns the patent for this process of imaging.

== Early life and education ==
Reyes Fuchs was born on April 18, 1986, in Mexico City, Mexico, to Dr Anselmo Reyes Gallardo and Carmen Patricia Fuchs Gómez. Starting in 1995 at age nine, Reyes Fuchs spent ten years as the pupil of Rosa María Arredondo, who taught her sketching, sculpting, painting and art history.

=== Higher education ===
In 2005, Reyes Fuchs began studying photography at Escuela Activa de Fotografía, later moving into studying film and specialising in cinematography. Part way through her studies she was offered the opportunity to work on a documentary, a decision that saw her drop out of school to pursue hands-on experience. She continued to learn through self-teaching and hands-on experience, to the point that she now gives conferences and master classes on cinematography for brands including ARRI and KinoFlo.

== Career ==
As a cinematographer, Reyes Fuchs focused primarily on t.v. series, advertising and documentary filmmaking. In 2008 she began working for the award-winning tourism campaign “Visit Mexico / Come Visit” and “México en tus sentidos” . She has worked as a DOP for numerous advertising campaigns, tv series, documentaries, and short films. She is also a member of AMC Asociación Mexicana de Cinefotógrafos y miembro fundador de Apertura, the Mexican Society of Female Cinematographers.

Reyes Fuchs is a public speaker and has given several TedxTalks, as well as different conferences including FICG (International Film Festival of Guadalajara), Concordia University, and Universidad de la Comunicación.

== Filmography ==
| Year | Title | Type | Role |
|---|---|---|---|
| 2012 | Chemiéres | Short Film | Director of Photography |
| 2012 | Diamond Seed | Documentary | Director of Photography |
| 2012 | Wirikuta Se Defiende (Official Video) | Music Video | Director of Photography |
| 2016 | Vida Eterna y Asociados | Short Film | Director of Photography |
| 2016 | Mura-Mura | Short Film | Director of Photography |
| 2018 | We Genius Minds | Documentary | Director of Photography |
| 2018 | Juana la Payasa | Short Film | Director of Photography |
| 2019 | Las Muchas Madres | Advertisement / Short Film | Director of Photography |
| 2021 | Fiestas Con Sabor a México | Series | Director of Photography |
| 2022 | El Rey Vicente Fernandez | Series | Director of Photography |
| 2023 | L Pop | Series | Director of Photography |
| 2023 | Pact of Silence | Series | Director of Photography |
| 2024 | Intercambiadas | Feature Film | Director of Photography |
| 2025 | Papa Melisa | Feature Documentary | Director of Photography, Producer |

== Dead Soon| Innerstela ==
Reyes Fuchs captured an array of multicoloured nebulae when she looked at her father's ashes, utilising a bright field microscope at UNAM’s MicroFilm Lab with the support of Alejandro Martinez, Director UNAM's MicroFilm Lab.

== Awards ==
Reyes Fuchs has received nominations for Best Cinematography and was awarded Best Cinematography at the 2016 Asia Short Film Festival for her work on Mura-Mura, directed by Ragnar Chacin.

She has been awarded several prizes and scholarships including: FONCA Artistic Residency 2014 Banff Centre for the Arts, CONACULTA Coproduction Grant in Co-production with CONCORDIA University Topological Media Lab 2015–2016, SBCAST AIR 2018, and SBCAST AIR 2019.

== Personal life ==
Since 2011, Reyes Fuchs is an practising student of Tibetan Buddhism, under the guidance of Zasep Tulku Rinpoche.

She has lived and worked in several countries, including Canada, USA, Mongolia, and Korea. In her spare time she enjoys meditating, rock climbing, and diving.
