= Jorge Artajo =

Spanish painter

Jorge Artajo Muruzabal (born 14 October 1952) is a Spanish visual artist, draftsman, writer, performer and social activist.

== Biography ==
Muruzabal was born in Sádaba, (Zaragoza). Graduate in Media Studies and Communications by the Complutense University (Universidad Complutense) in Madrid. He was arrested several times in 1970 and 1972 during Franco's dictatorship when demonstrating in several campaigns against political repression and for Amnesty and Freedom, and was confined from several months at the Carabanchel Prison (cárcel de Carabanchel) in Madrid. As a painter and draftsman he has a great diversity of themes and stiles: From naive and colourful paintings to very dark drawings.

== Illustrated books ==
- Máscaras, Imágenes, proverbios y palabras. Carlos Rodriguez. 1974.
- De qué va la alimentación natural. Rosa Sola Franch. 1977
- Somnis. Comediants. 1987
- La Nit. Comediants. 1987
- Prendas íntimas. Ana Rossetti. 1989
- Virgo Potens. Ana Rossetti. 1989.
- La aventura de Sir Karel de Nortumbria. Manuel Alfonseca. 1990
- La noche no es hermosa. Terenci Moix. 1994
- Las bodas reales. Ana Rossetti. 2006.
- Buenos días Sr. Hoy. Ana Rossetti. 2007.

== Book covers ==
- Soc Llegenda. Richard Matheson. 1988.
- Historias fantásticas. Stephen King. 1990.
- La danza de la muerte. Stephen King. 1990.
- El hijo de la noche infinita. John Farris. 1990
- La veu melodiosa. Montserrat Roig. 1990.

== Shows and exhibitions ==
- COGAM Madrid
- Teatre Lliure. Barcelona

== Performances ==
- Virgo Potens y las ánimas (Virgo Potens and the souls). With Ana Rossetti
- La búsqueda de Diógenes nos 1 y 2 (Diogenes Search # 1 & 2)
