= 2022 Dominican Republic census =

10th national census of the Dominican Republic

- November 2022

General information
- Country: Dominican Republic
- Topics: Census topics: Location; Sex and gender; Population and households; Country of birth; Religion; Age structure; Ethnicity
- Authority: National Statistics Office
- Website: censos.gob.do

Results
- Total population: 10,760,028 (13.9% ▲)
- Most populous Province: Santo Domingo (7.923.553)
- Least populous Province: Pedernales (34,375)

The 2022 Dominican Republic census is the tenth Dominican Republic national census, and was held from the 10 to 23 of November 2022, during the presidency of Luis Abinader. Originally planned to take place in 2020, the census was delayed because of the COVID-19 pandemic. In 2022, the census was originally scheduled to conclude in 23 November, but, it was extended to the end of month due to work delays. The population of the Dominican Republic was counted as 11.596.254 – an increase of 2,914,747 (13.9%) over the 2010 census.

First results from the 2022 census were released to the public on 10 August 2023, from the Oficina Nacional de Estadística website.

== Preparation ==
As required by law, the Dominican Republic census has been conducted every 10 years since 1920. The 2010 Dominican Republic census was the previous census completed.

== Census sections ==
The census was divided into six sections.

Section I

- Geographic location

Section II

- Household characteristics

Section III

- Household identification

Section IV

- Household characteristics

Section V

- List of people who make up the household

Section VI

- Characteristics of people in the household This is the first Dominican census to have an ethno-racial question since the 1960 census, and on section six people are able to choose from "black", "white", "indio", "mulato", "mestizo", "Asian", and "other".

== Results ==
Director said of the preliminary results:

The Census is a great tool of great use for decision-making, both for the public and private sectors, since it provides information on how much we are, who we are and where we live; basic information for the proper formulation of public policies and decision-making. It is an honour for me, taking into account previous censuses, to be able to deliver these first results in such a short time, which represents an achievement of Dominican society that has understood the importance of a statistical operation like this, being part of the first technological census of the Dominican Republic. We are infinitely grateful for the support provided.

— Miosotis Rivas Peña, Director of Oficina Nacional de Estadística.

=== Population by residence ===
Population by residence are as follows.

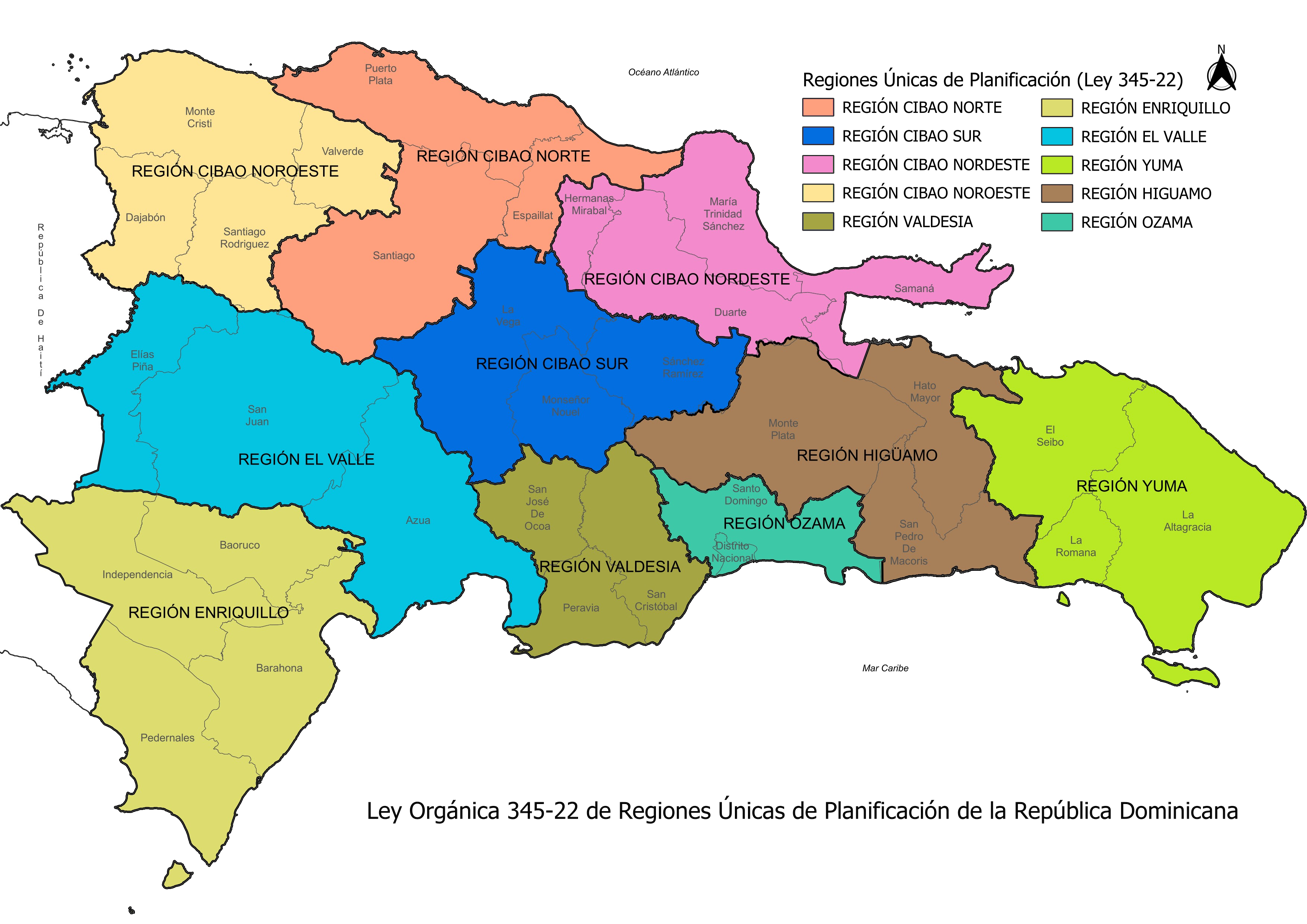
Regions of the Dominican Republic.

Region	Population - 2022		
Region	Total	Men	Women
Cibao Norte	1,654,092	822,498	831,594
Cibao Sur	800,908	404,876	396,032
Cibao Nordeste	673,414	339,278	334,136
Cibao Noroeste	447,033	227,825	219,208
Valdesia	967,282	481,033	486,249
Enriquillo	404,667	205,510	199,157
El Valle	549,490	282,818	266,672
Yuma	833,143	415,485	417,658
Higuamo	642,777	318,242	324,535
Ozama	3,798,698	1,831,422	1,967,276
Dominican Republic	10,771,504	5,328,987	5,442,517

=== Self-identified racial group ===
Responses are for the population of 12 years old and above. National Statistics Office.

Ethnic-racial group (skin color)	Population	%
Indio/a (Note: The term "indio" in the Dominican Republic is not associated with people of indigenous ancestry but people of mixed ancestry or skin color between light and dark)	2,946,377	34.2
Moreno/a	2,237,370	26.1
White	1,611,752	18.7
Mestizo/a	665,387	7.7
Black	642,018	7.5
Mulatto/a	330,207	3.8
Asian	28,343	0.3
Other	31,802	0.3
Don't know / no response	123,039	1.4
Total	8,616,295	100

Province	% Negro (Black)	% Moreno (Dark skinned) (Note: Vernacular term for black)	% Mestizo (Light brown) (Note: Academic term)	% Mulato (Dark brown)	% Indio (Light brown)	% Asiático (Asian)	% Blanco (White)	Other
Distrito Nacional	5.72%	20.85%	13.33%	5.80%	27.50%	0.42%	23.51%	0.53%
Santo Domingo	7.13%	29.50%	9.40%	4.78%	31.19%	0.37%	15.79%	0.42%
Espaillat	5.19%	17.79%	4.09%	2.15%	41.82%	0.22%	26.87%	0.20%
Puerto Plata	6.95%	22.96%	5.21%	2.84%	39.50%	0.27%	20.16%	0.43%
Santiago	5.86%	17.25%	6.04%	2.97%	38.82%	0.33%	26.95%	0.38%
La Vega	4.96%	16.95%	5.27%	2.16%	40.01%	0.32%	28.36%	0.51%
Sánchez Ramírez	5.44%	22.65%	6.13%	4.12%	43.21%	0.30%	16.87%	0.16%
Monseñor Nouel	4.10%	18.77%	6.56%	2.64%	40.72%	0.37%	24.21%	0.33%
Duarte	4.20%	16.84%	6.32%	3.30%	45.45%	0.33%	22.04%	0.38%
María Trinidad Sánchez	6.69%	22.11%	4.95%	2.82%	41.61%	0.38%	19.94%	0.26%
Hermanas Mirabal	3.65%	13.96%	5.58%	2.63%	47.99%	0.18%	24.90%	0.22%
Samaná	8.36%	35.09%	5.37%	3.39%	33.08%	0.39%	12.97%	0.24%
Dajabón	11.77%	21.69%	3.63%	1.81%	41.29%	0.39%	18.47%	0.10%
Monte Cristi	16.29%	18.86%	3.08%	1.69%	40.33%	0.20%	18.69%	0.16%
Santiago Rodríguez	7.00%	11.65%	3.77%	2.61%	44.41%	0.62%	28.74%	0.13%
Valverde	12.17%	17.42%	4.82%	2.05%	37.67%	0.33%	24.13%	0.18%
Peravia	7.33%	28.78%	5.20%	2.87%	35.47%	0.25%	18.75%	0.29%
San Cristóbal	6.85%	40.03%	7.36%	3.85%	29.48%	0.36%	10.75%	0.29%
San José de Ocoa	10.25%	15.43%	3.60%	1.24%	41.20%	0.19%	26.80%	0.26%
Baoruco	12.39%	31.64%	7.80%	4.35%	29.03%	0.37%	12.99%	0.15%
Barahona	10.49%	25.28%	5.94%	4.25%	36.62%	0.28%	15.62%	0.51%
Independencia	17.19%	32.32%	4.57%	3.96%	26.10%	0.25%	13.08%	0.24%
Pedernales	19.50%	27.37%	4.42%	4.25%	27.23%	0.36%	13.69%	0.46%
Azua	6.52%	32.40%	5.71%	2.33%	33.35%	0.15%	18.01%	0.27%
Elías Piña	14.39%	46.93%	4.05%	2.30%	22.99%	0.12%	7.96%	0.11%
San Juan	5.27%	36.62%	7.28%	4.18%	30.63%	0.37%	14.13%	0.17%
El Seibo	12.46%	27.07%	4.73%	3.64%	38.15%	0.24%	11.72%	0.53%
La Altagracia	13.04%	24.32%	8.00%	4.45%	32.13%	0.26%	16.09%	0.37%
La Romana	11.14%	28.59%	10.12%	4.21%	31.06%	0.29%	12.95%	0.32%
San Pedro de Macorís	10.06%	35.91%	8.12%	3.07%	29.70%	0.19%	11.69%	0.38%
Monte Plata	7.38%	39.40%	6.12%	3.16%	33.59%	0.30%	8.54%	0.31%
Hato Mayor	8.62%	27.79%	6.15%	2.69%	39.03%	0.36%	13.65%	0.43%

== See also ==
- 1920 Santo Domingo census
- 1950 Dominican Republic census
- 1960 Dominican Republic census
- 1970 Dominican Republic census
- 2010 Dominican Republic census
- Dominicans
