= 2010 Dominican Republic census =

2010 Dominican Republic census IX Censo Nacional de Población
- 1 December 2010

General information
- Country: Dominican Republic
- Authority: National Statistics Office
- Website: one.gob.do

Results
- Total population: 9,445,281 (▲TBD)
- Most populous Province: Santo Domingo
- Least populous Province: Pedernales

The 2010 Dominican Republic census is the ninth Dominican Republic national census, raised from 1–7 December 2010, during the presidency of Leonel Fernández. This census collected information respect on sex, occupation, age, fertility, marital status, nationality, literacy, ability to vote, and housing. The Dominican Republic's next census took place in 2022.

== General results ==
General results
Indicator	Quantity	%
Total population	9,445,281	100
Men	4,739,038	50.17
Women	4,706,243	49.83

General results
Indicator	Quantity	%
Peasants	2,431,706	25.7%
Urbanites	7,013,575	74.3%

=== Regions ===
Regions
I Región del Cibao Norte	1,516,957	16.06%
II Región del Cibao Sur	710,821	7.53%
III Región del Cibao Nordeste	624,186	6.61%
IV Región del Cibao Noroeste	394,068	4.17%
V Región de Valdesia	1,028,129	10.89%
VI Región de Enriquillo	368,594	3.90%
VII Región de El Valle	295,362	3.13%
VIII Región del Yuma	606,323	6.42%
IX Región del Higuamo	561,431	5.94%
X Región del Ozama	3,339,410	35.36%

=== Age structure ===
Population by age and sex
Age group	Both genders	Males	Females
Age 0 to 4	896,706	456,410	440,296
Age 5 to 9	938,460	476,395	462,065
Age 10 to 14	973,761	492,891	480,870
Age 15 to 19	983,223	490,883	492,340
Age 20 to 24	876,934	440,626	436,308
Age 25 to 29	766,233	384,692	381,541
Age 30 to 34	713,072	358,475	354,597
Age 35 to 39	636,723	317,814	318,909
Age 40 to 44	580,398	291,868	288,530
Age 45 to 49	499,459	249,950	249,509
Age 50 to 54	403,689	203,683	200,006
Age 55 to 59	320,960	159,507	161,453
Age 60 to 64	268,529	133,341	135,188
Age 65 to 69	186,305	92,388	93,917
Age 70 to 74	157,330	76,743	80,587
Age 75 to 79	103,228	49,317	53,911
Age 80 to 84	76,710	36,237	40,473
Age 85 to 89	34,585	15,425	19,160
Age 90 to 94	17,991	7,839	10,152
Age 95 to 99	7,029	2,962	4,067
Age 100 and over	3,956	1,592	2,364

=== Country of birth ===
Population by country of birth^{note 1}
Indicator	Quantity	%
Dominican Republic	9,049,490	95.810%
ABROAD	395,791	4.190%
Haiti	311,969	3.302%
OVERSEAS	83,822	0.887%
Anglo-America (except West Indies)
United States	24,457	0.259%
Canada	1,152	0.012%
Europe
Spain	6,691	0.071%
Italy	3,595	0.038%
France	1,936	0.020%
Germany	1,574	0.017%
Switzerland	990	0.010%
Netherlands	562	0.006%
Russia	457	0.005%
United Kingdom	457	0.005%
Belgium	243	0.003%
Austria	197	0.002%
Portugal	101	0.001%
Ibero-America
Puerto Rico	5,763	0.061%
Venezuela	5,132	0.054%
Cuba	3,639	0.039%
Colombia	3,416	0.036%
Mexico	1,419	0.015%
Peru	1,353	0.014%
Argentina	1,015	0.011%
Panama	717	0.008%
Brazil	611	0.006%
Chile	600	0.006%
Ecuador	551	0.006%
Guatemala	406	0.004%
Honduras	402	0.004%
Costa Rica	291	0.003%
Nicaragua	277	0.003%
El Salvador	253	0.003%
Uruguay	173	0.002%
Bolivia	162	0.002%
Far East
China	1,406	0.015%
Japan	327	0.003%
Taiwan	309	0.003%
South Korea	217	0.002%
West Indies (except Spanish-speaking islands)
Saint Martin (French side)	468	0.005%
Curaçao	313	0.003%
Antigua and Barbuda	170	0.002%
Aruba	152	0.002%
Saint Kitts and Nevis	130	0.001%
Jamaica	126	0.001%
Near East
Lebanon	142	0.002%
Africa
Central African Republic	128	0.001%
not declared	9,289	0.098%

== Provincial and municipal results ==
Population born in the country or abroad, by place of residence
Place (Region, Province)	Born in national soil	%	Born abroad	%
Ozama	3,217,696	96.355%	121,714	3.645%
Distrito Nacional	921,072	95.444%	43,968	4.556%
Santo Domingo	2,296,624	96.726%	77,746	3.274%
Yuma	552,931	91.194%	53,392	8.806%
La Altagracia	242,517	88.766%	30,693	11.234%
La Romana	231,022	94.128%	14,411	5.872%
El Seibo	79,392	90.547%	8,288	9.453%
Higuamo	541,051	96.370%	20,380	3.630%
San Pedro de Macorís	278,678	95.944%	11,780	4.056%
Monte Plata	180,588	97.113%	5,368	2.887%
Hato Mayor	81,785	96.198%	3,232	3.802%
Cibao Norte	1,451,026	95.654%	65,931	4.346%
Espaillat	225,552	97.247%	6,386	2.753%
Puerto Plata	303,116	94.253%	18,481	5.747%
Santiago	922,358	95.738%	41,064	4.262%
Cibao Sur		%		%
La Vega		%		%
Sánchez Ramírez		%		%
Monseñor Nouel		%		%
Cibao Nordeste		%		%
Duarte		%		%
María Trinidad Sánchez		%		%
Hermanas Mirabal		%		%
Samaná		%		%
Cibao Noroeste		%		%
Dajabón		%		%
Monte Cristi		%		%
Santiago Rodríguez		%		%
Valverde		%		%
Valdesia		%		%
Azua		%		%
Peravia		%		%
San Cristóbal	561,395	98.502%	8,535	1.498%
San José de Ocoa	56,885	95.534%	2,659	4.466%
Enriquillo		%		%
Baoruco		%		%
Barahona		%		%
Independencia		%		%
Pedernales	27,807	88.033%	3,780	11.967%
El Valle		%		%
Elías Piña	56,865	90.220%	6,164	9.780%
San Juan	226,208	97.364%	6,125	2.636%

== See also ==
- 1920 Santo Domingo Census
- 1950 Dominican Republic Census
- 1960 Dominican Republic Census
- 1970 Dominican Republic Census
- 2022 Dominican Republic Census
- People of the Dominican Republic

== Notes ==
^note 1 Only countries with over 100 immigrants are shown.

== Sources ==
- National Bureau of Statistics (2012). "Ninth National Census of Population, 2010". Volume 1.
