= Juan Bautista Alfonseca =

Dominican officer and bandleader (1810 – 1875)

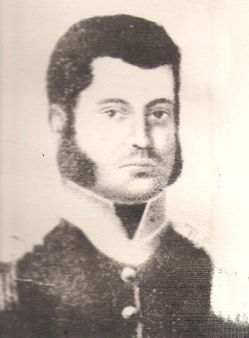

Colonel Juan Bautista Alfonseca Baris (June 23, 1810 – August 9, 1875) was a Dominican officer who fought in the Dominican War of Independence, and a composer known for his role in the development of merengue music. Though the music written by Alfonseca was not, at the time, specifically labeled as "merengue", its incorporation of Dominican folk motifs into Latin formal music such as the danza paved the way for that genre, causing many to label him "the father of merengue".

In addition to his proto-merengue, Alfonseca served as a chapelmaster in Santo Domingo, writing two masses. Alfonseca also wrote patriotic music; following the proclamation of independence of the First Dominican Republic on February 27, 1844, he produced the nation's first proposed national anthem, though it was not adopted.

During the Spanish annexation, he managed to use his military rank to form part of the Reserves. During the Dominican Restoration War, despite his limited participation, he, like many of his fellow countrymen, did not believe in the triumph of the revolution, and waited for the Spanish to abandon the territory in order to feel Dominican again.
