= Manuel Alfonseca =

Spanish writer and university professor

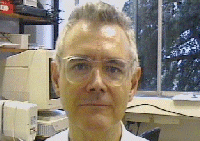
- Manuel Alfonseca in 2003
- Born: Manuel Alfonseca Moreno; April 24, 1946 (age 80); Madrid, Spain
- Occupations: Professor novelist Science popularizer

Manuel Alfonseca (born April 24, 1946) is a Spanish writer and university professor. He is the son of the painter and sculptor Manuel Alfonseca Santana.

== Career ==
He is a doctor of communications engineering and graduated in Computer Science. He worked for 22 years at IBM (1972–1994), where he was Senior Technical Staff Member. He has been a professor at several universities: Complutense de Madrid, Politécnica de Madrid and (now) Autónoma de Madrid, where he was a full professor (currently an honorary professor) and director of the Escuela Politécnica Superior (2001–2004).

He has published about two hundred technical papers in Spanish and English, as well as many articles on popular science in high diffusion newspapers and web blogs.

He is the author of over fifty books in the fields of computer science and popular science, as well as historic novels, science fiction, and young adult literature.

== Awards ==
He was granted the Lazarillo Award (1988) and La Brújula Award for Children and Young Adult Narrative (2012), besides having been finalist and included in honor lists several times. He was also given three Outstanding Technical Achievements Awards (1981, 1983, 1985) and one Technical Paper Award (1989) by IBM.

== Works ==
Novels

a) Fantasy

a1) Series: The Chronicles of the Magic Jigsaw Puzzle

- The journey of Tivo the Dauntless, Writers Club Press, San José, CA, 2000. English translation of El viaje de Tivo el Arriesgado, Siglo Cultural, 1986.
- The mystery of the Black Lake. English translation of El misterio del Lago Negro, Siglo Cultural, 1986.
- The Silver Swan. English translation of La odisea del Cisne de Plata, Siglo Cultural, 1986.
- The secret of the ice field. English translation of El secreto del campo de hielo, Siglo Cultural, 1986.
- The lost continent. English translation of El continente perdido, Siglo Cultural, 1986.

a2) Various

- Sir Karel of Northumbria. English translation of La aventura de Sir Karel de Nortumbria, Espasa-Calpe, 1990, Anaya, 2002.
- Ennia in Fairie. English translation of Ennia, Noguer, 1993.

b) Historical

b1) Series: The Aeolian Family

- The Seal of Aeolus, 2020. English translation of El sello de Eolo, Edebé, 2000.
- The Emerald Tablet, 2020. English translation of La tabla esmeralda, Palabra, 2004.
- The Tartessian Crown, 2019. English translation of La corona tartesia, San Pablo, 2012. IV La Brújula Award (2012).

b2) Various

- The ruby of the Ganges, 2016. English translation of El rubí del Ganges, Noguer, 1989. Lazarillo Award 1988, translated into Catalan and English.
- The Heirloom of King Scorpion, 2016. English translation of La herencia del rey Escorpión, Aguilar, 1989. Finalista of the Lazarillo Award 1987 and Elena Fortún Award 1988. Translated into French and English: La revanche d'Osiris, Hachette, 1993.
- Hidden Hand, 2023. English translation of Mano Escondida, Alfaguara, 1991. Oxford University Press, 2012.
- The water of life, 2015. English translation of El agua de la vida, S.M., 1998.
- Una cuestión de honor, Palabra, 1998.

c) Science Fiction

c1) Series: Solar System

- Under an orange sky. English translation of Bajo un cielo anaranjado, S.M., 1992.
- Descent into the hell of Venus. English translation of Descenso al infierno de Venus, Palabra, 1999.
- Operation Quatuor, 2021. English translation of Operación Quatuor, 2016.
- Operation Viginti, 2023. English translation of Operación Viginti, 2023.

c2) Series: The Earth-9 Colony

- The history of the Earth-9 colony, 2013. English translation of La historia de la colonia Tierra-9, 2013.
- The Earth-9 colony revisited, 2022. English translation of Retorno a la colonia Tierra-9, 2022.

c3) Various

- A face in time, 2019. English translation of Un Rostro en el Tiempo, Noguer, 1989. Finalist of CCEI Award, 1989. Edelvives, 2012.
- Beyond the black hole. English translation of Más allá del agujero negro, Terra Nova, 1995.
- The last dinosaur. English translation of Tras el último dinosaurio, Edebé, 1996. Translated to English, Catalan and Galician.
- Jacob's ladder. English translation of La escala de Jacob, S.M., 2001.
- The dwellers of night, English translation of Los moradores de la noche, Anaya, 2012. Finalist of the Award to the best independent national novel by El Templo de las mil Puertas, 2013.

d) Mystery and intrigue

d1) Series: The Sleuths of the Spanish Transition

- Quetzalcoatl's Zahir, 2017. English translation of El zahir de Quetzalcoatl , Schedas, 2014.
- The Mystery of the Haunted House, 2017. English translation of El misterio de la casa encantada , Schedas, 2014.
- The Mystery of the Sapphire Bracelet, 2017. English translation of El misterio del brazalete de zafiros , Schedas, 2015.
- The Mystery of the Honeymoon, 2017. English translation of El misterio de la luna de miel , Schedas, 2015.
- The Mystery of the Egyptian Vulture Country House, 2017. English translation of El misterio de la Quinta del Alimoche, Schedas, 2017.

d2) Various

- Historias en la oscuridad, 2014.
- Operación Koresh, 2025.

e) Miscellaneous

- Espérame, Nina, voy contigo, Palabra, 1997.
- Albatross, 2023. English translation of Albatros, Anaya, 2001.

Popular science

- Human cultures and evolution, Vantage Press, New York, 1979.
- La vida en otros mundos, Alhambra, 1982. McGraw Hill, 1993.
- El futuro de la evolución, Alhambra, 1985.
- El tiempo y el hombre, Alhambra, 1985.
- De lo infinitamente pequeño a lo infinitamente grande, Alhambra, 1986.
- 1000 grandes científicos, diccionario Espasa, 1996.
- The fifth level of evolution. English translation of El quinto nivel, Adhara, 2005. Digital revised edition, 2014.
- Time and Man, 2022. English translation of El tiempo y el hombre, Ediciones U.A.M., 2008, 2022.
- ¿Es compatible Dios con la ciencia? Evolución y cosmología, CEU Ediciones, 2013.
- 60 preguntas sobre ciencia y fe respondidas por 26 profesores de universidad, ed. Francisco José Soler Gil y Manuel Alfonseca. Stella Maris, 2014. New edition Schedas 2020.
- Viajes hacia lo infinitamente pequeño y lo infinitamente grande. Ediciones Logos e Instituto de Filosofía Universidad Austral, Buenos Aires, 2015.
- World Population: Past, Present, & Future. World Scientific, Singapore, 2016. Coauthors: Julio A. Gonzalo, Félix F. Muñoz.
- Evolución biológica y cultural en la historia de la vida y del hombre, CEU Ediciones, 2017.
- Todo es número. ¿Es matemática la realidad? EMSE EDAPP, Barcelona, 2019.
- Un universo en evolución, CEU Ediciones, 2023.
- Jacques Monod (1910-1976). Estudio crítico de "El azar y la necesidad", Fundación Ciudadanía y Valores, 2025.

Popular computer science

- Cómo hacer juegos de aventura, Siglo Cultural, Enciclopedia Práctica de la Informática Aplicada, nr. 1, Madrid 1986.
- Aprenda Matemáticas y Estadística con el lenguaje APL, Siglo Cultural, Enciclopedia Práctica de la Informática Aplicada, nr. 30, Madrid 1987.

Texts on computer science

- Teoría de Lenguajes, Gramáticas y Autómatas, Universidad y Cultura, Textos de Cátedra, Madrid 1987, 1991, Promosoft, 1997. Coauthors: Justo Sancho y Miguel Angel Martínez Orga.
- Programación Orientada a Objetos, Anaya Multimedia, 1992. Coauthor: Alfonso Alcalá.
- Guía práctica de C y C++, Anaya Multimedia, 1999. Edición revisada y ampliada, 2005. Edición revisada y ampliada, 2014. Coauthor: Alejandro Sierra.
- Compiladores e intérpretes: teoría y práctica, Pearson Education, 2006. Coauthors: Marina de la Cruz, Alfonso Ortega, Estrella Pulido.
- Teoría de Autómatas y Lenguajes Formales, McGraw Hill, 2007. ISBN 978-84-481-5637-4. Coauthors: Enrique Alfonseca, Roberto Moriyón.

Miscellaneous

- Krishna frente a Cristo, 1978, 2022. ISBN 84-300-0252-9.
- Krishna versus Christ, 2024. ISBN 979-8303264281.
- Christianity and Anti-Christianity in Fantasy and Science Fiction, 2025. ISBN 979-8272386724.
- The quantification of history and the future of the Western World, 2026. ISBN 979-825418514-7.
