= 1970 Dominican Republic census =

The Fifth National Census of Population of the Dominican Republic was taken in 9-10 January 1970, during the presidency of Joaquín Balaguer.

This census collected information aspects of sex, occupation, age, fertility, religion, marital status, nationality, literacy, ability to vote and housing.

Unlike all previous censuses, no information regarding race was collected. This census was made over two days instead of one.

== General results ==
General results
| Indicator | Quantity | % |
|---|---|---|
| Total population | 4,009,458 | 100 |
| Men | 2,000,824 | 49.90 |
| Women | 2,008,634 | 50.10 |
| Peasants | 2,416,159 | 60.26 |
| Urbanites | 1,593,299 | 39.74 |

Regions
| North | 1,798,644 | 44.86% |
| South | 1,397,394 | 34.85% |
| National District | 813,420 | 20.29% |

== See also ==
- 1920 Santo Domingo Census
- 1950 Dominican Republic Census
- 1960 Dominican Republic Census
- 2010 Dominican Republic Census
- 2022 Dominican Republic Census

== Sources ==
- National Bureau of Statistics (1976). Fifth National Census of Population, 1970.
