= Rosa María Alfonseca =

Mexican painter

Rosa María Alfonseca Arredondo (born April 29, 1953) is a Mexican graphic artist whose work has been recognized with membership in Mexico's Salón de la Plástica Mexicana.

== Life ==
Alfonseca was born in Mexico City but showed no artistic inclination while growing up. When she entered the National Autonomous University of Mexico (UNAM), and spent two years studying psychology. This led her to the theories of Freud and from there to surrealism. She found these dream-like images compelling, prompting her to drop out of UNAM and register to study at the Escuela Nacional de Pintura, Escultura y Grabado "La Esmeralda".

There she met students who promoted the use of art for social causes and who eventually were invited to visit Russian-Mexican artist Vlady at his studio in Mexico City. This began a relationship between Alfonseca's group and the Vlady, which had great influence in her development as an artist.

In addition to her art career, she has also co authored a book with Jose Francisco Coello Ugalde, El Bosque De Chapultepec: Un Taurino De Abolengo published by Instituto Nacional de Antropología e Historia in 2001.

== Career ==
Her work has been exhibited in various parts of Mexico, Latin America and Europe, and she has drawn and done graphic work for various publications including the covers of books, magazines and CDs.

She has also been teaching since age 26, mostly in art topics.

Alfonseca was accepted in the Salón de la Plástica Mexicana in 2000.

== Artistry ==
Alfonseca is principally a graphic artist, especially lithography and her images are primarily figurative. However she has also created works with other graphic techniques along with gouache, Chinese ink, acrylics and oils along with the making of art objects and installations. In addition to her experience with Vlady, other important influences on her work have been literature, especially poetry. Her images are mostly related to social issues with themes such as loneliness, injustice, death and destruction. Geometric forms often find their way into compositions as complementary in a symbolic way to the realistic figures.)
