= 1920 Santo Domingo census =

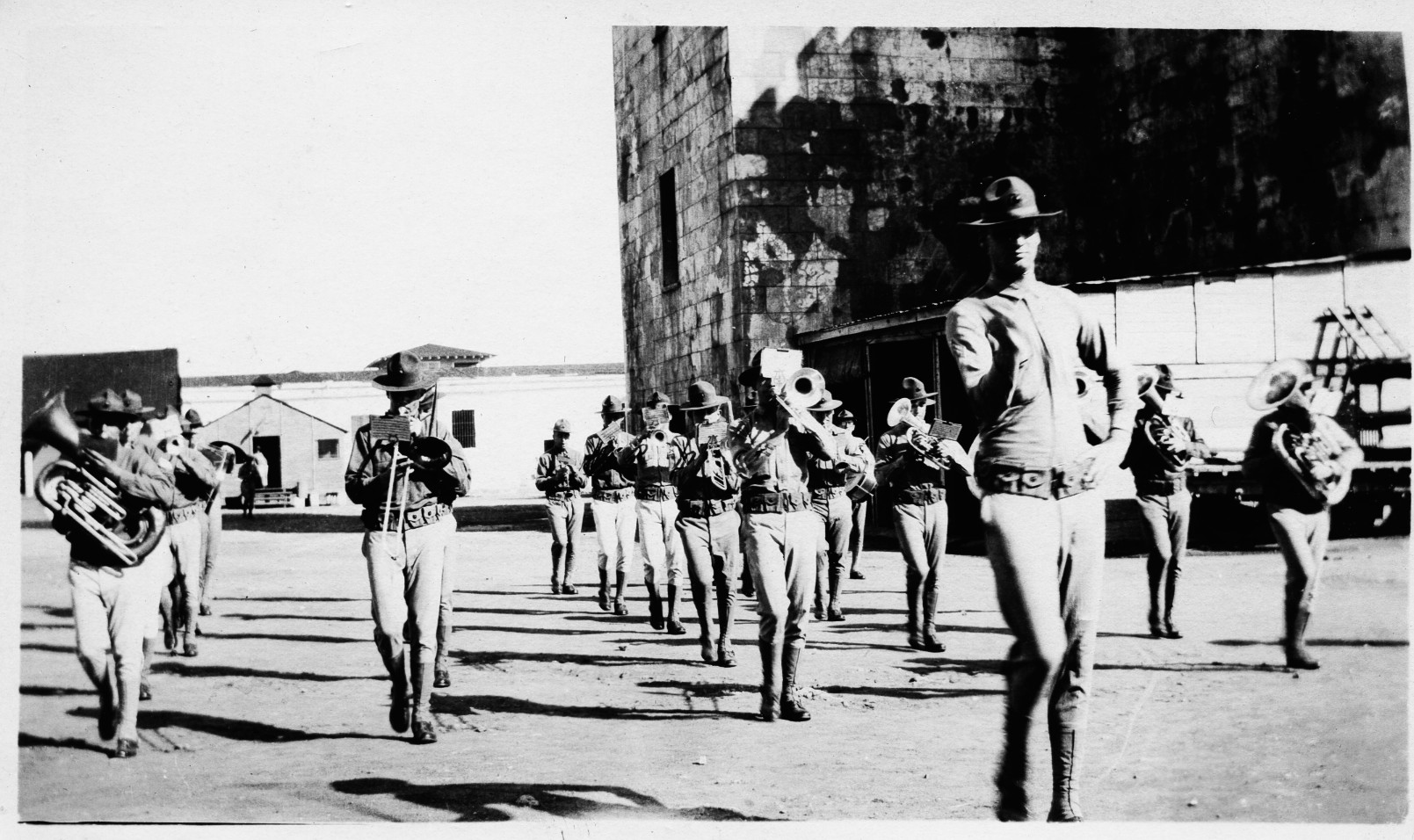
United States Marines next to Ozama Fortress

The 1920 Santo Domingo Census was conducted from 19 January to 24 December 1920, during the administration of the general Thomas Snowden, American governor of the Santo Domingo following the American occupation of the Dominican Republic.

This was the first census done in the land of the former Dominican Republic since the Spanish colonial period, although the Catholic Church had done several parish censuses; the 1920 census collected information regarding on sex, age, fertility, race, religion, marital status, nationality, and housing.

== General results ==
General results
Indicator	Quantity	%
Total population	894,665	100
Men	446,384	49.9
Women	448,281	50.1

Regions
North	501,358	56.04%
South	246,655	27.57%
Department of Santo Domingo	146,652	16.39%

Results on Nationality and Race
Indicator	Quantity	%
Dominicans	845,145	94.5
Foreigners	49,520	5.5
from Haiti	28,258	3.1
from the West Indies	8,305	0.9
from Puerto Rico	6,069	0.7
from Spain	1,443	0.2
from the United States (excluding marines)	891	0.1
from Cuba	741	0.1
from another country	3,813	0.4
Whites	223,144	24.9
Mestizos and yellows	444,587	49.7
Blacks	226,934	25.4

Results on Creeds
Religion	Quantity	%
Catholic	882,425	98.632
Protestant	11,927	1.333
Jewish	55	0.006
another	258	0.029

== See also ==
- 1950 Dominican Republic census
- 1960 Dominican Republic census
- 1970 Dominican Republic census
- 2010 Dominican Republic census
- 2022 Dominican Republic census

== Sources ==
- Secretary of State of Home Affairs and Police (1923). First National Census of Population, 1920. University of Santo Domingo Publishing House.
