= 1960 Dominican Republic census =

The Fourth National Census of Population of the Dominican Republic was raised on 7 August 1960, during the presidency of Joaquín Balaguer, after a decree issued by his predecessor Héctor Trujillo.

This census collected information respect on sex, occupation, age, fertility, race, religion, marital status, nationality, literacy, ability to vote, and housing.

== General results ==
The 1960 census showed a total population of 3,047,070 with 1,535,820 (50.4%) men and 1,511,250 (49.6%) women. Most identified as peasants living rurally with 30.2% living in urban areas.

General results
| Indicator | Quantity | % |
| Total population | 3,047,070 | 100 |
|---|---|---|
| Men | 1,535,820 | 50.40 |
| Women | 1,511,250 | 49.60 |
| Peasants | 2,124,980 | 69.74 |
| Urbanites | 922,090 | 30.26 |

=== Regions ===
Regions
| North | 1,483,280 | 48.68% |
| South | 1,096,960 | 36.00% |
| District of Santo Domingo | 466,830 | 15.32% |

=== Marital status ===
Results on marital status
| Marital status | Quantity | % |
| Population of age 15 and older | 1,606,170 | 100.00 |
|---|---|---|
| Single | 607,920 | 37.85 |
| Married | 464,480 | 28.92 |
| Widowed | 51,110 | 3.18 |
| Cohabitating | 462,880 | 28.82 |
| Divorced | 19,780 | 1.23 |

=== Nationality ===
Results on nationality
| Indicator | Quantity | % |
|---|---|---|
| Dominicans | 3,002,370 | 98.533 |
| Foreigners | 44,700 | 1.467 |
| from Haiti | 29,500 | 0.968 |
| from Spain | 4,060 | 0.133 |
| from Great Britain | 2,020 | 0.066 |
| from Japan | 1,200 | 0.039 |
| from Puerto Rico | 1,160 | 0.038 |
| from the British West Indies | 1,130 | 0,037 |
| from the United States of America | 870 | 0,029 |
| from Lebanon | 620 | 0,020 |
| from China | 600 | 0,020 |
| from British Guyana | 420 | 0,014 |
| from France | 340 | 0,011 |
| from Italy | 320 | 0,011 |
| from the Netherlands | 240 | 0,008 |
| from Cuba | 210 | 0,007 |
| from the Netherlands Antilles | 200 | 0,007 |
| from Syria | 140 | 0,005 |
| from the French West Indies | 50 | 0,002 |
| from British Jamaica | 50 | 0,002 |
| from the Virgin Islands | 20 | 0,001 |
| from other countries | 1,550 | 0,051 |

=== Race ===
The 1960 census asked people to self-identify with a racial group. This was the last time a question on ethno-racial identity was asked until the 2022 census when it was added again.

Results on race
| Indicator | Quantity | % |
|---|---|---|
| Whites | 489,580 | 16.08 |
| White men | 231,510 | 15.07 |
| White women | 258,070 | 17.08 |
| Blacks | 331,910 | 10.89 |
| Black men | 179,290 | 11.67 |
| Black women | 152,620 | 10.10 |
| Mixed people | 2,222,380 | 72.93 |
| Mixed men | 1,123,310 | 73.14 |
| Mixed women | 1,099,070 | 72.73 |
| Yellows | 3,200 | 0.11 |
| Yellow men | 1,710 | 0.11 |
| Yellow women | 1,490 | 0.10 |

=== Religion ===
Results on creed
| Religion | Total |
|---|---|
| Catholic Christians | 2,991,200 |
| Evangelical Christians | 29,690 |
| Adventist Christians | 5,380 |
| another religion | 18,270 |
| no religion | 2,530 |

=== Age and sex ===
Population by age and sex
| Age group | Both genders | Males | Females |
|---|---|---|---|
| Age 0 to 4 | 689,662 | 348,772 | 340,890 |
| Age 5 to 9 | 600,310 | 303,817 | 296,493 |
| Age 10 to 14 | 485,429 | 225,967 | 259,462 |
| Age 15 to 19 | 352,527 | 166,745 | 185,782 |
| Age 20 to 24 | 316,111 | 149,521 | 166,590 |
| Age 25 to 29 | 262,800 | 128,168 | 134,632 |
| Age 30 to 34 | 230,888 | 116,737 | 114,151 |
| Age 35 to 39 | 186,213 | 95,453 | 90,760 |
| Age 40 to 44 | 152,799 | 81,213 | 71,586 |
| Age 45 to 49 | 118,635 | 63,565 | 55,070 |
| Age 50 to 54 | 109,625 | 57,992 | 51,633 |
| Age 55 to 59 | 62,697 | 35,662 | 27,035 |
| Age 60 to 64 | 75,086 | 39,863 | 35,223 |
| Age 65 to 69 | 32,662 | 17,464 | 15,198 |
| Age 70 to 74 | 33,413 | 17,425 | 15,988 |
| Age 75 and over | 45,427 | 21,764 | 23,663 |

== See also ==
- 1920 Santo Domingo Census
- 1950 Dominican Republic census
- 1970 Dominican Republic census
- 2010 Dominican Republic census
- 2022 Dominican Republic census
- Dominicans

== Sources ==
- The National office of the Census (1966). Fourth National Census of Population, 1960.
