= 1950 Dominican Republic census =

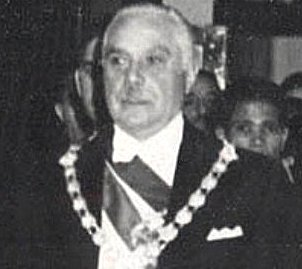
President Trujillo

The Third National Census of Population of the Dominican Republic was raised on 6 August 1950, during the presidency of Rafael Leónidas Trujillo, after the Decree No.6091 of 20 October 1949.

This census collected information on sex, occupation, age, fertility, race, religion, marital status, nationality, literacy, ability to vote, and housing.

== General results ==
General results
Indicator	Quantity	%
Total population	2,135,872	100
Men	1,070,742	50.13
Women	1,065,130	48.87
Peasants		76.20
Urbanites		23.80

Regions
North	1,100,573	51.53%
South	795,835	37.26%
District of Santo Domingo	239,464	11.21%

Results on marital status
Marital status	Quantity	%
Total population	2,135,872	100.00
Single	1,432,579	67.07
Married	341,887	16.01
Widowed	44,182	2.07
Cohabitating	310,240	14.52

Results on Nationality and Race
Indicator	Quantity	%
Dominicans	2,101,218	98.4
Foreigners	34,654	1.6
from Haiti	18,772	0.9
from another country	15,882	0.7
Whites	600,994	28.14
Mestizos	1,289,285	60.36
Blacks	245,032	11.47
Yellows	561	0.03

Results on Creed
Religion	%
Catholic	98.25
Protestant	1.43
Buddhist	0.00
Jewish	0.02
Adventist	0.14
another	0.06
none	0.09
not declared	0.01

Fertility rate
Zones	Average of Children per mother
Nationwide	5.0
Urban	4.1
Rural	5.3

Mother tongue or native language
Language	Total %	Urban %	Rural %
Spanish	98.00	97.82	98.06
French	1.19	0.39	1.44
English	0.57	0.96	0.45
Arabic	0.09	0.35	0.01
Italian	0.03	0.10	0.01
another language	0.12	0.35	0.04

== See also ==
- 1920 Santo Domingo Census
- 1960 Dominican Republic Census
- 1970 Dominican Republic Census
- 2010 Dominican Republic Census
- 2022 Dominican Republic Census

== Sources ==
- National office of the Census (1958). Third National Census of Population, 1950.
