= Afro-Dominicans =

Dominicans of African descent

Black Dominicans
Dominicanos Negros (Spanish)
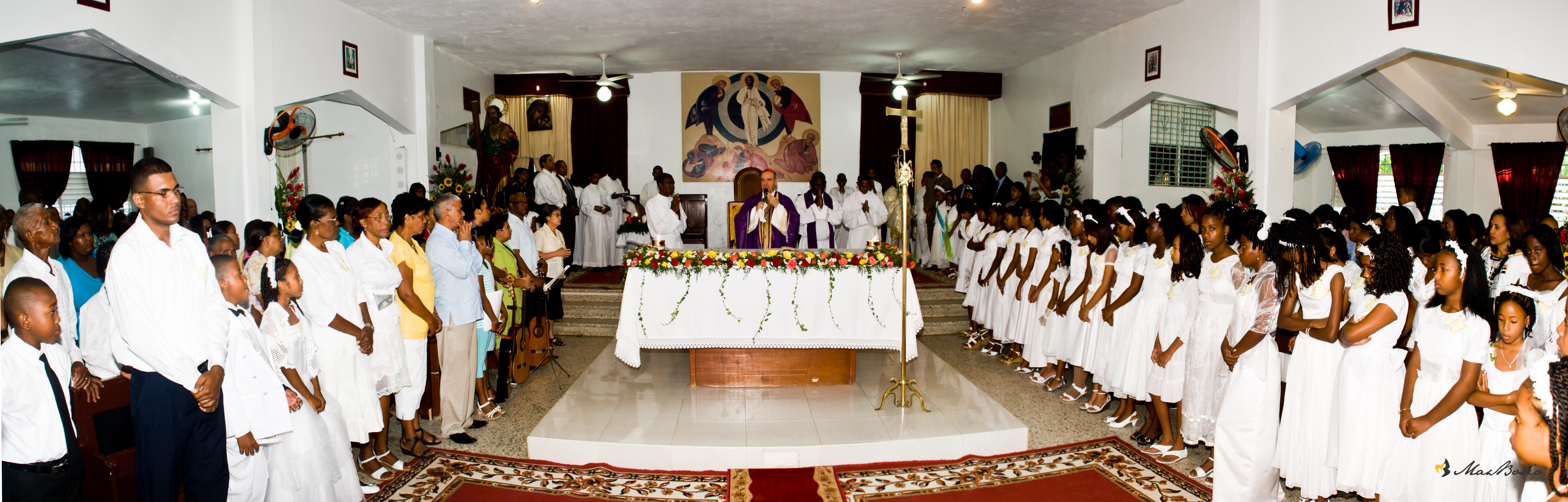
- Afro-Dominicans attending church service.

Total population
- Sub-Saharan ancestry predominates ▲642,018 (2022 census); 7.5% of the population (Only 12 years and older)

Regions with significant populations
- Chiefly in Elías Piña, San Pedro de Macorís, Santo Domingo, and San Cristóbal; also in Dajabón, Pedernales, Independencia, La Romana and Hato Mayor

Languages
- majority Dominican Spanish, Samaná English, Frespañol, Spanglish

Religion
- Roman Catholicism, Protestantism, Dominican Vudú

Related ethnic groups
- Dominican people, other Afro-Caribbean and Afro-Latin Americans, Afro-Cubans, Black Americans, Afro–Puerto Ricans

Afro-Dominicans (also referred to as African Dominicans or Black Dominicans; Spanish: Dominicanos negros) are Dominicans of total or predominant Sub-Saharan African (Black African) ancestry. They are a minority in the country representing 7.5% or 642,018 of the population, according to the 2022 census.

In a previous estimate they were 7.5% of the Dominican Republic's population according to a survey published in 2021 by the United Nations Population Fund. About 4.0% of the people surveyed claim an Afro-Caribbean immigrant background, while only 0.2% acknowledged Haitian descent. Currently there are many black illegal immigrants from Haiti, who are not included within the Afro-Dominican demographics as they are not legal citizens of the nation.

The first black people in the island were brought by European colonists as indentured workers from Spain and Portugal known as Ladinos. When the Spanish Crown outlawed the enslavement of Natives in the island with the Laws of Burgos, slaves from West Africa and Central Africa were imported from the 16th to 18th centuries due to labor demands. However, with the decline of the sugar industry in the colony the importation of slaves decreased, leading to a rise in free blacks, which eventually became the majority within the Afro-Dominican demographic by the late 1700s. Many of these Africans eventually intermixed with the Europeans, Mestizos, and Natives creating a triracial culture.

In the 19th and 20th centuries black immigrants from the French and British West Indies, as well as the United States came to the island and settled in coastal regions increasing the black population. The Afro-Dominican population can now be found in most parts of the country, from coastal areas such as San Cristobal and San Pedro de Macoris to deep inland areas such as Cotui and Monteplata.

There is a lack of recent official data because the National Office of Statistics (ONE) has not released racial data since 1960, though the Central Electoral Board collected racial data until 2014. The 1996 electoral roll put the figures of "black" at 8.6% and "mulatto" at 52.8% of the adult population. The 1960 population census (the last one in which race was queried) placed it at 8.8%. According to a 2011 survey by Latinobarómetro, "The Adventure Guide to the Dominican Republic" the black population is estimated to be 35% of the Dominican population.

== History ==
=== 16th – 18th century ===
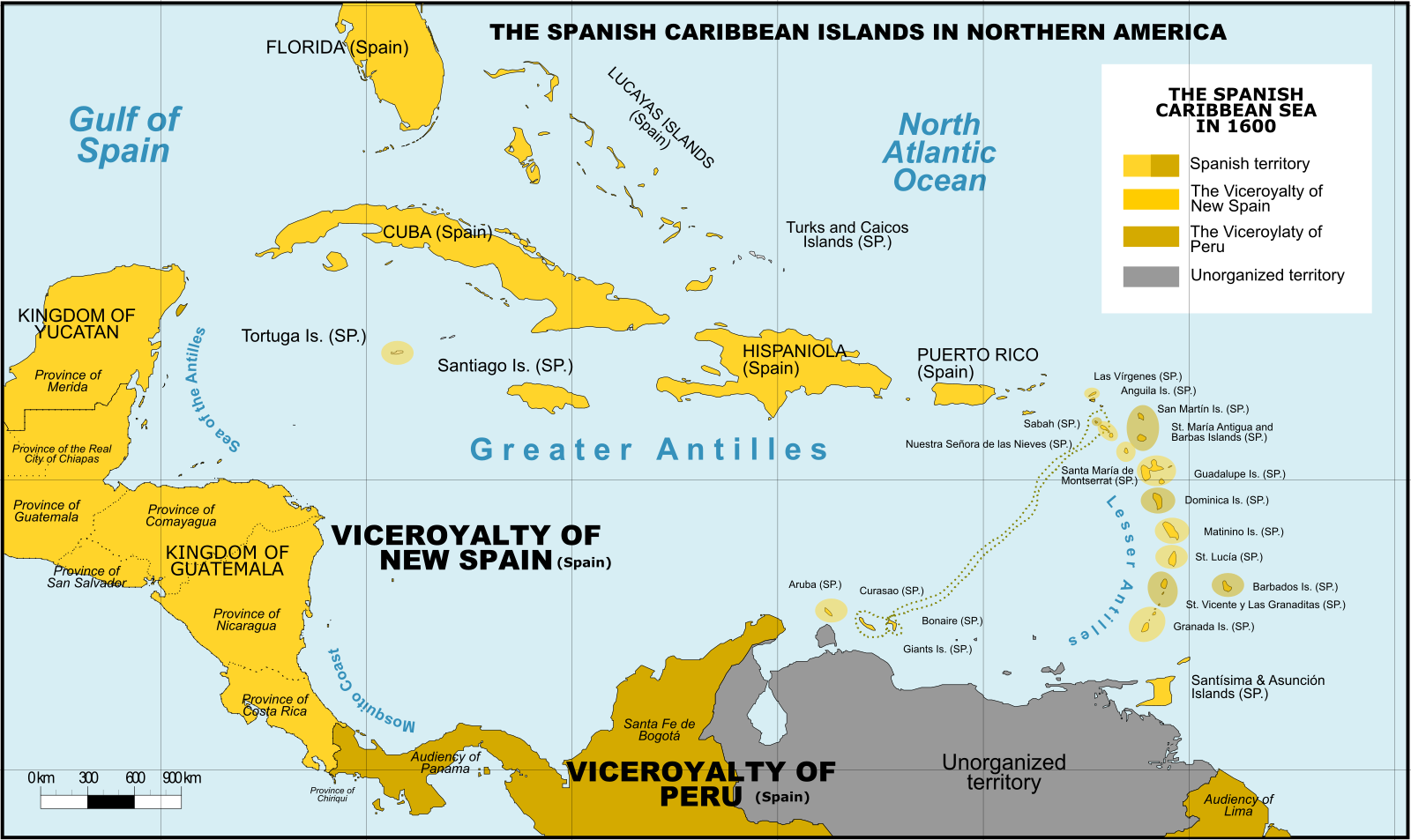
Spanish Caribbean with The Captaincy General of Santo Domingo in the center.

In 1502 (or 1503), the Spanish Crown finally acquiesced to the colonists' demands for enslaved Africans. The Santo Domingo colony, the only European possession yet in America, had already produced a devastating effect on the Taino, Lucayan (Arawaks), and Kalinga (Caribs) populations. A decade of intense exploitation and deadly waves of plagues had reduced the indigenous populations to levels that even the Spaniards considered dangerous. As the Hispaniolan Tainos (and Cigüayos) declined during the first couple of years of colonization, the colonial administration run by Christopher Columbus had gone against the wishes of Isabel I of Castile and had begun the first European slave trade on the western side of Atlantic. Raids that cleared out from Santo Domingo under the disguise of pacification and to evangelize nearby islanders had brought in other Amerindians to the colony. They were a large number of enslaved Lucayos from the Bahamas and Kalingas from the eastern islands. Now toiling alongside native Hispaniolans, these war captives became the first enslaved foreign workers on the island of Quisqueya, one of the indigenous names for the island that Columbus called Hispaniola. By the turn of the century, not even the captured neighbors could supply the labor demands of the mines and plantations. Rudimentary mining techniques and the always backbreaking mass-production of food-stuff required an ever-growing number of coerced workers. Expanding the colonization project to Puerto Rico and requesting the Crown permission to purchase enslaved Africans were the only two solutions colonists seemed capable of conceiving. Ferdinand I of Aragon, widowed and freed from Isabel's more cautious hand, granted both wishes to the embattled colonists in the Indies. It was never a liberal expansion nor an open trade, however. Though unrestrained by religious piety, Ferdinand, who was the ideal Prince in Machiavelli's imagination, was wary in the extreme of potential Conquistador-owned kingdoms (medieval style) in his new possessions, and of slave rebellions in the colonies. So, the first group of enslaved Africans to arrive at the Ozama River were not Piezas de Indias purchased from the Portuguese traders, but a select group of seasoned Black Ladinos. They formed their own confraternities as early as 1502, and they are considered the first community of the African diaspora in the Americas. The profit too was meant to stay within his kingdom. Indian resistances, flights, and diseases, however, forced the crown to open the market to thousands of bozales, enslaved Africans directly from the continent.

In 1521, the first major slave rebellion was led by 20 Senegalese Muslims of Wolof origin, in an ingenio (sugar factory) east of the Santo Domingo colony. Many of the insurgents fled to the mountains and established what would become the first autonomous African Maroon community in America. With the success of this revolt, slave revolts continued and leaders emerged among the African slaves, such as Sebastían Lemba. This also included people already baptized Christian by the Spanish, as was the case of Juan Vaquero, Diego de Guzmán and Diego del Ocampo. The rebellions and subsequent escapes led to the establishment of African communities in the southwest, north and east of the island, including the first communities of African ex-slaves in western Hispaniola that was Spanish administered until 1697, when it was sold to France and became Saint-Domingue (modern-day Haiti). This caused some concern among slaveholders and contributed to the Spanish emigration to other places. Even as sugarcane increased profitability in the island, the number of escaped Africans continued to rise, mixing with Taíno people of these regions, and by 1530, Maroon bands were considered dangerous to the Spanish colonists, who traveled in large armed groups outside the plantations and left the mountainous regions to the Maroons.

With the discovery of precious metals in South America, the Spanish abandoned their migration to the island of Hispaniola to emigrate to South America and Mexico in order to get rich, for they did not find much wealth there. Thus, they also abandoned the slave trade to the island, which led to the collapse of the colony into poverty. Still, during those years, slaves were used to build a cathedral that in time became the oldest in the Americas. They built the monastery, first hospital and the Alcázar de Colón, and the Puerta de las Lamentaciones (Spanish: Gate of Mercy). In the 1540s, Spanish authorities ordered the African slaves building a wall to defend the city from attacks by pirates who ravaged the islands.

After 1700, with the arrival of new Spanish colonists, the Atlantic slave trade resumed. However, as industry moved from sugar to livestock, racial and caste divisions became less important, eventually leading to a blend of cultures—Spanish, African, and indigenous—which would form the basis of national identity for Dominicans. It is estimated that the population of the colony in 1777 was 400,000, of which 100,000 were Europeans and Criollos, 60,000 African, 100,000 mestizo, 60,000 zambo and 100,000 mulatto.

=== 19th century ===
Given the relative ease of manumission for enslaved Africans, some fugitive African slaves from Saint-Domingue, the western French colony of the island fled east to Santo Domingo and formed communities such as San Lorenzo de Los Mina, which is currently part of the "city" of Santo Domingo. (A second group of Haitian slaves was later imported to build the French colonial enclave Puerto Napoleon in Samana). Fugitives arrived from other parts of the West Indies as well, especially from the various islands of the Lesser Antilles. Meanwhile, by this point, free blacks had consisted the majority of Afro-descendant Dominicans, who enjoyed some degree of social and political freedom in Santo Domingo. However, slavery remained legal, and remnants of colonial prejudices still persisted in Dominican society. These would become the underlying issues during the future struggles for Dominican independence until the 1840s.

 By the late 1780s, free people of color in the island were inspired by the French Revolution to seek an expansion of their rights, while also involving enslaved Africans to fight for their cause.[citation needed] Despite adhering to European royalist political views, Toussaint Louverture, the primary figure of what would become the Haitian Revolution, used the language of freedom and equality associated with the French Revolution.[24] From being willing to bargain for better conditions of slavery late in 1791, he had become committed to its complete abolition.[25] Inspired by Louverture's call for freedom and equality, which caused the Spanish to look with disfavor on his control of a strategically important region,[26] both free and enslaved blacks in Santo Domingo sought to continue their fight for freedom in the colony. These would transpire into a series of slave revolts to bring about that began in 1795, which would intensify following the Treaty of Basel, which led to the cession of Santo Domingo to France that same year. Over the next five years, slave insurrection persisted in Santo Domingo, the most impactful of the revolts being the 1796 Boca de Nigua slave revolt, which greatly weakened the effects of slavery in Santo Domingo.

In 1801, Louverture seized the colony from France and abolished slavery, freeing about 40,000 enslaved persons, and prompting much of the planter of that part of the island to flee to Cuba and Puerto Rico. After he was deposed in 1802, the French officials reasserted its domain in Santo Domingo, although slavery still remained prohibited. Some time after this, another slave revolt erupted, but was once again suppressed.

Simultaneously, Jean-Louis Ferrand rounded his troops to engage in slave raiding along the border. This action would infuriate and spark the wrath of Haiti's self proclaimed emperor, Jean-Jacques Dessalines. Realizing Ferrand's intention to restore slavery, Dessalines ordered an invasion of Santo Domingo in February 1805. He managed to reach the capital, but it was protected by a large wall, built back in 1540s by the Dominican slaves, thereby preventing Dessalines from laying his siege on the capital. However, after learning of a French ship believed to be heading towards Haiti to attack the country, Dessalines called off his invasion, and retreated through the Cibao, practicing scorched-earth tactics along the way, one famous exemple being the events that came to be known as the massacre, or beheadings, of Moca.

In 1809, the French government was toppled by the Criollo leader, Juan Sánchez Ramírez. However, slavery was re-established when the Spanish recovered the colony that same year. This caused discontent among the black population.

In 1812, when the ruling Spanish government refused to abolish slavery and grant Spanish citizenship to free blacks, a conspiracy erupted. This ended in failure and its leaders, José Leocadio, Pedro de Seda, and Pedro Henríquez, (all of whom were free blacks), were executed. Some nine years later, in 1821, the Spanish was overthrow in a revolt, this time led by José Núñez de Cáceres, who renamed the independent nation as the Republic of Spanish Haiti. Tensions arose in the government, of which the topic of slavery was among the most divisive. Núñez de Cáceres, although he freed his own slaves, refused to abolish it in the new nation. Slavery remained intact until 1822, when it was again abolished by the mulatto Haitian president Jean-Pierre Boyer, during the unification of Hispaniola which began in February of that year. However, he maintained a system of indentured servitude, the Code Rural, on the newly-emancipated Dominican slaves.

In 1824, African American freed people began to arrive under the Haitian administered island, benefiting from the favorable pro-African immigration policy of Boyer since 1822, called the Haitian emigration. Called the Samaná Americans, they mostly settled in Puerto Plata Province and the Samaná Peninsula regions.

In 1838, the liberal leader Juan Pablo Duarte established the Trinitario movement. Duarte, a strong advocate for racial unity, sought to establish a nation that guaranteed equal rights to all Dominicans irrespective of race and color. Despite these principles, Duarte still had to endure the early distrustful sentiments from the black and mixed raced populations. From their perspective, they considered the Trinitarios as a white supremacist organization because it was composed strictly of white middle class Dominican men, and thus, initially refused to support them. However, at the suggestion of Jose Díaz, Duarte's uncle, he suggested reaching out to prominent black leaders to gain the confidence of the people and help make the movement a reality. Many Afro-Dominicans such as Francisco del Rosario Sánchez, José Joaquín Puello, Gabino Puello, Manuel Mora, María Trinidad Sánchez and Petronila Gaú would go on to play key roles in the struggle for independence.

However, following the proclamation of Dominican independence in 1844, fears of the return of slavery still accumulated amongst many Black soldiers, especially those who had been former slaves prior to 1822. Such was the case when Santiago Basora, leader of the "African Battalion" of the Liberation Army, led a revolt on the dawning hours of February 28, 1844. After this, the abolition of slavery was announced through a decree by the new government. (This would be reinforced through another decree by the Central Government Board chaired by Pedro Santana). After 1844, black laborers from the British West Indies were imported to work in the sugar plantations on the east of the island. (Their descendants are known today by the name of Cocolos).

Over the next 20 years, the First Dominican Republic was ravaged with political instability as a result of authoritarian regimes, specifically under the dominiance of prominent cuadillo leaders such as Buenaventura Báez and Pedro Santana. Although both were periodically in competition with the other for power, both had plans to give the country's independence back to a European power. In the early 1860s, Santana, backed by the Creole elite, secured a deal with Spain to revert the Dominican Republic back to colonial status. The annexation also found support from Afro-Dominicans, including well-distinguished politicians and military leaders who had fought in the Dominican War of Independence (1844–56). These included Juan Suero and Eusebio Puello. The former would later gain fame in the Spanish Army and was referred as El Cid Negro (The Black Cid), and the latter, (the brother of fallen black activists José Joaquin Puello and Gabino Puello), left the island for Cuba, where he, still as a Spanish general, participated several campaigns to suppress the insurrection led by Carlos Manuel de Céspedes in the Ten Years' War.

However, discontent soon followed and revolts to overthrow the regime began to take erupt. During the Dominican Restoration War (1863–65), in what started as a peasants rebellion, Afro-Dominicans who feared the return of slavery would play a central role in revolution. The war was characterized the first time where Black patriots united behind the rebellion to restore Dominican independence, and in the meantime, served in prominent positions of the revolutionary government and as high ranking military commanders. Some examples included José Cabrera, Marcos Evangelista Adón, Juan Nouesí, Felipe Mañón, and Eutimio Mambí.

Although politics remained unstable after the war, a dictatorship under Ulises Heureaux, had begun in 1882. His regime was marked by its dependency of foreign loans and corruption, which plagued the Dominican economy until his assassination in 1899.

=== 20th century ===
In 1920 the United States conducted a census in the country during its military occupation. The country was divided into 12 provinces and 63 cities and towns. The most populated Dominican province was Santo Domingo with 146,652 inhabitants, and the least populated was Samaná with 16,915 inhabitants. The most populated city was Santiago with 72,150 inhabitants, followed by La Vega with 58,466 and the capital city of Santo Domingo with 45,007 inhabitants; the least populated city was El Jovero (now Miches) with only 1,692 inhabitants.

"The people of the Dominican Republic are mainly of Spanish descent, some pure white, others mixed with African blood, others with an admixture of Indian, and still others a combination of white, Indian, and black. While the pure black, or nearly black, African American is far less in evidence than in Haiti. Along the coast and on the plantations there are an immense number of negros from Turks Islands, the Bahamas, Jamaica, and the other West Indies. In other localities the blacks are scattered among the other people so that they are scarcely noticeable, and while the Dominican Republic cannot by any stretch of the imagination be called a “black republic” it is distinctly a coloured one, but the colour is far lighter than in most of the West Indies and to a superficial observer a large portion of them would pass for white."

The province with the highest proportion of blacks was San Pedro de Macorís with 40%, with half of those being of foreign origin. The provinces with the most immigrants were Monte Cristi and San Pedro de Macorís, with 11,256 and 10,145 foreigners, mostly from Haiti (97%) in the first province, and from the West Indies (56%), Haiti (20%) and Puerto Rico (17%), in the case of the latter. Proportionately, foreigners represented 26.3% of the population of San Pedro de Macorís and 16.8% of the population of Monte Cristi.

The towns with the highest proportion of blacks were Restauración with 74%, followed by La Victoria, and Villa Mella; those with the lowest proportion of blacks were Monción with only 4%, and Constanza, Altamira and Jarabacoa with 8% each. The towns with the highest proportion of mestizos were Constanza and Monción, with 73% and 71% percent, respectively; the towns with the lowest proportion of mestizos were Villa Rivas and Pimentel with 9% each. The towns with the highest proportion of whites was Pimentel with 73%, followed by Castillo, Gaspar Hernández, La Peña, Villa Rivas, San José de las Matas, Jánico, Esperanza, Baní and Santiago.

== Origins of the slaves ==
The Atlantic slave trade involved nearly all of Africa's west coast inhabitants, from Senegal to Angola, serving as embarkment points for the transport of slaves to the Americas.

Based on these records, the majority of African slaves were: Wolof (captured from Senegal), Fon, Ewe, and Aja (collectively called Ararás in Santo Domingo and captured from Dahomey & Allada, current Benin), Igbo and Ibibio (from the Bight of Biafra, modern-day eastern Nigeria), Yoruba (from the Oyo Empire, modern-day western Nigeria), Akan (from the Gold Coast, modern-day Ghana), Ambundu (from the Kingdom of Ndongo, in north Angola), Bakongo (from the Kingdom of Kongo, in Congo and Angola), Bran (originating from Brong-Ahafo Region, west from Ghana), Fulbe, Kalabari (originating from slave port from Calabar, in Nigeria), Terranova (slaves bought probably in Porto-Novo, Benin), Zape (originating from Sierra Leone), Bambara and Biafada (this latter was originating from Guinea-Bissau) people.

The Wolof were bring brought to Santo Domingo from Senegal in the first half of the sixteenth century, until the import of this ethnic group was prohibited after their rebellion in 1522. Many of the slaves were also Ajas, usually taken in Whydah, Benin. The Ajas arrived in Santo Domingo, were well known for having made religious brotherhoods, integrated exclusively for them, the San Cosme and San Damian.

== Demographics ==
=== Census ===
Black Dominicans 1920-2022
Year	Population	% of Dominican Rep.
1920	226,934	25.37%
1950	245,032	▼11.47%
1960	331,910	▼10.89%
2022	642,018	▼7.45
Source: Dominican census

Black (Spanish: Negro, colloq. Moreno) has historically been a part of the official racial classification system of the Dominican Republic. The census bureau decided to not use racial classification beginning with the 1970 census. The Dominican identity card (issued by the Junta Central Electoral) used to categorize people as yellow, white, Indian, and black. In 2011 the Junta planned to replace Indian with mulatto in a new ID card with biometric data that was under development, but in 2014 when it released the new ID card, it decided to just drop racial categorization, the old ID card expired on 10 January 2015. The Ministry of Public Works and Communications uses racial classification in the driver's license, the categories used being white, mestizo, mulatto, black, and yellow.

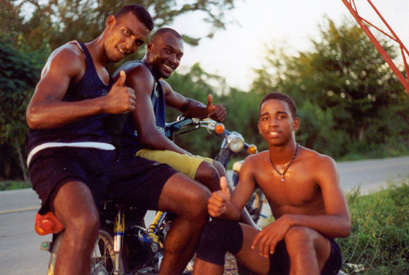
Black Dominicans in Bayahibe.

The National Institute of Statistics (INE) does not collect racial data since the Census of 1960. In that census, the ethnic features were obtained by direct observation of the people registered by the enumerator, without any questions asked. About 73% of the population was classified as mestizo (note that in the 1920, 1935, 1950 and 1960 censuses referred to mixed-race people as mestizo or mulatto), 16% was classified as white, and 11% was classified as black (1,795,000 of people). The Dominican Republic is one of the few countries in Latin America where the majority of the population is made up of multiracials of predominately European and African descent, with a lesser degree of Amerindian admixture.

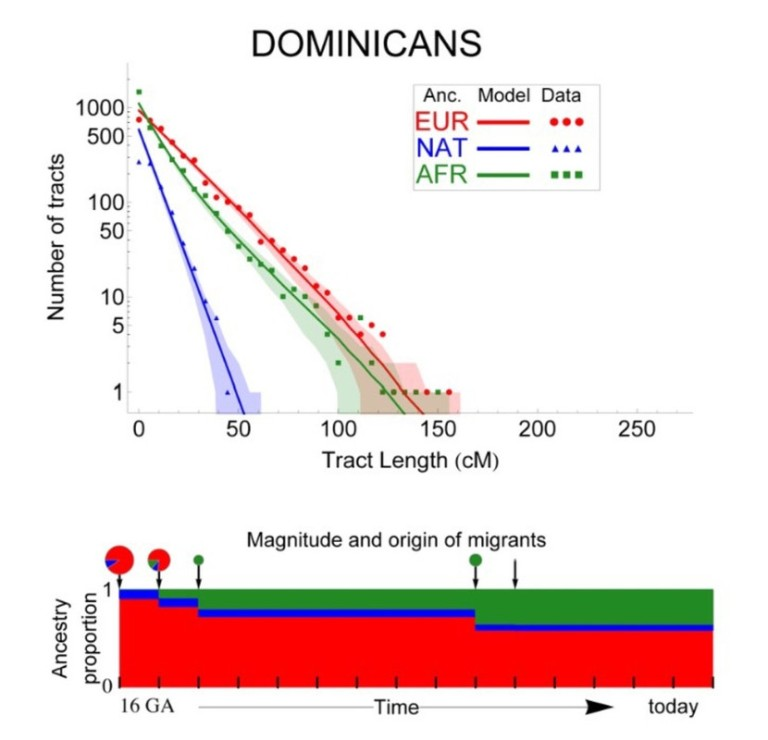
Timeline of the Dominican Republic's genepool showing a predominantly European-admixed founder population, and an increase of the African population over time. During most of the colonial period, the share of each ancestry group was as follows: 71% European, 10% Native, 19% African. After the 19th-century Haitian and Afro-Caribbean migrations the ratio changed to: 57% European, 8% Native and 35% African. European DNA Native American DNA African DNA

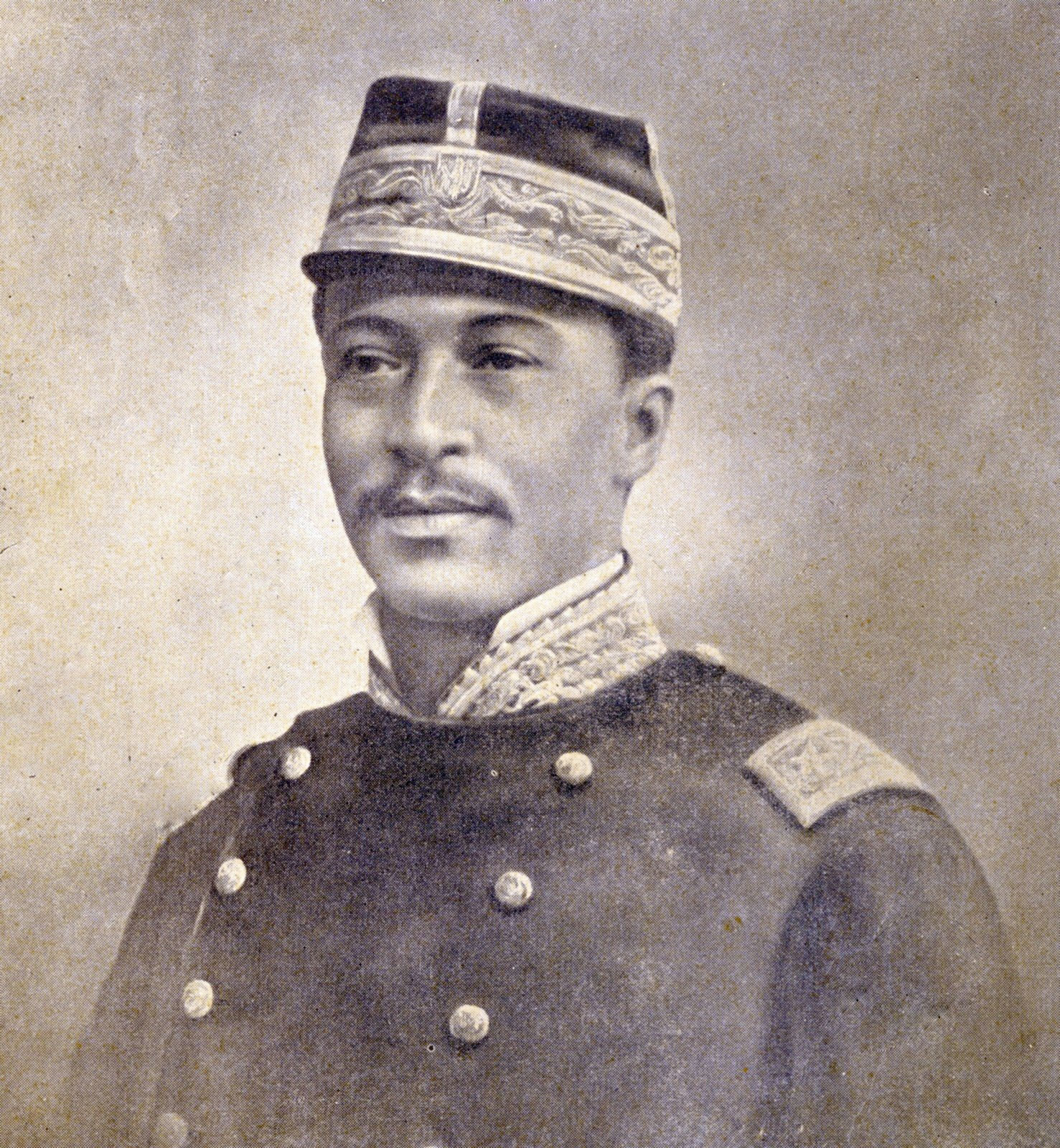
General Gregorio Luperon's father was a Spanish Dominican of colonial origin, while his mother was a black migrant from the Anglo-Caribbean.

There are also many Afro-communities that descend from post-colonial migrations, most notably the Samaná Americans and Cocolos. Samaná Americans from the Samaná Peninsula, are descendants, of freed slaves from the United States, who entered the country in 1824 when it was under Haitian rule, because of the favorable pro-African immigration policy of Haitian president Jean-Pierre Boyer, constitute the most sizable group of native English speakers in the Dominican Republic. Aware of its distinctive heritage, the community, whose singular culture distinguishes them from the rest of Dominicans, refers to itself as Samaná Americans, and is referred to by fellow Dominicans as "los americanos de Samaná". Another Afro-group is the called Cocolo, descendants of those who came to the island from the English-speaking islands in the eastern Caribbean to work in the sugar plantations in the eastern part of the island between the late nineteenth and early twentieth century, they have formed communities in San Pedro de Macorís and La Romana. Its largest population of Afro-people are of Haitian origin, which is also the largest immigrant community in the country and is numbered according to some estimates, to be more than 800,000 people.

The 1920 Census registered 8,305 West Indians born abroad (they and their descendants are known as Cocolos) and 28,258 Haitians; the 1935 Census registered almost 9,272 West Indians and 52,657 Haitians. The Haitian population decreased to 18,772 in the 1950 Census, as an aftermath of the Parsley Massacre. Another estimate puts the Dominican population in actuality at 60% Mixed, 35% Black, and 5% White.

=== Geographic distribution ===
Though, African ancestry is common throughout the Dominican Republic, today it is more prevalent in eastern areas such as San Pedro de Macorís, La Romana, and the Samaná Peninsula, as well as along the Haitian border, particularly the southern parts of the border region; it is least prevalent in the Cibao Valley (especially within the Central Sierra region), and to a lesser extent, in some rural communities in El Seibo and La Altagracia provinces, and the western half of the National District as well. However, in the 19th and early 20th century, African ancestry was higher in the southwestern region than in the eastern region, due to the impact of the Afro-Antillean and Haitian immigration during the 20th century.

Dominicans of Haitian ancestry live scattered across the country, however, communities in the border provinces of Elías Piña and Independencia, where they predominate among the population, highlighting the presence of European football fields, a very popular sport in Haiti.

Geographic distribution of blacks in the country is often tied to history. Higher concentrations of Afro Dominicans, descended from African slaves bought to colonial Santo Domingo, are in the southeast plain, because that is where most of the slaves were in the Spanish side of the island, around Monte Plata, El Seibo, and Hato Mayor etc. This same region is where there is a high concentration of Haitian immigrants, working on sugarcane bateyes (plantations). Cocolos, blacks descended from immigrants from other Caribbean islands, especially the Lesser Antilles nations, often settled San Pedro and La Romana. Blacks descended from relocated American slaves, mostly settled Samana and Puerto Plata. Haitian immigrants also have a big presence in places with a lot of construction and tourist activity, larger cities and tourist towns like Punta Cana, as well as in the border region.

=== Genetics ===
===== Autosomal DNA =====
In addition to being found to have 9% Native American and 52% European (e.g., Northern/Western) ancestry, Afro-Dominicans, who were sampled in 2016 and self-reported their African ancestry, were found to be 38% African (e.g., Yoruba).

== Cultural contributions ==
=== Music ===
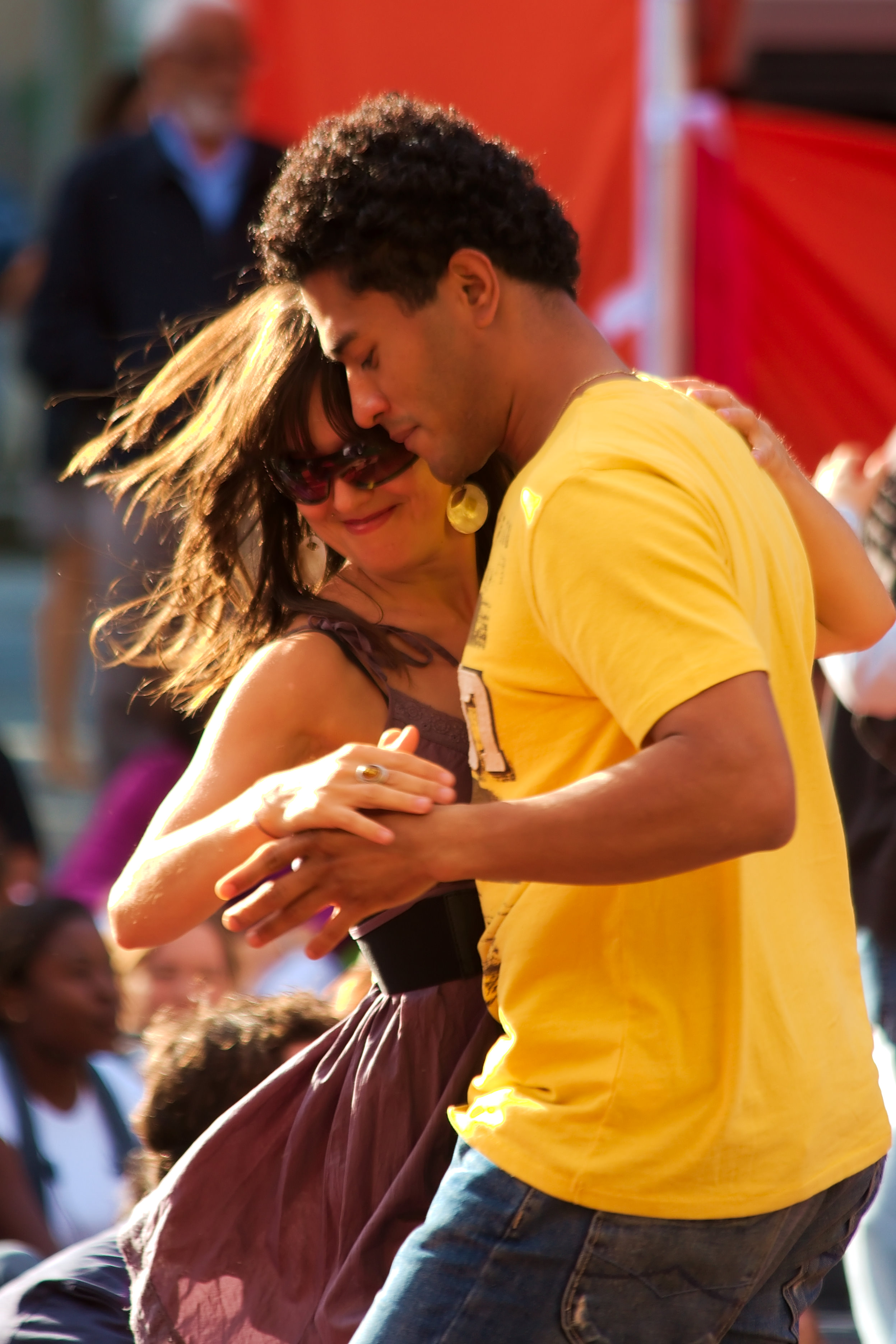
Mixed Dominican man with Afro ancestry dancing merengue.

The influence of enslaved Africans is observed in music and dance. Such influence comes from dances like the calenda, practiced in the Dominican Republic, as elsewhere in America, from the early years of slavery. This dance derives, according to research by the folklorist Fradique Lizardo, from several Dominican popular rhythms. One of the most widespread is the Música de palos (music of sticks), a name that designates both the pace and the membranophones used. National rhythms with obvious African imprint are sarandunga, Música de Gagá (Ganga's music, arrived from Haiti), Baile de Palos (dance of sticks), Música de Congos (music of Congos), Cantos de Hacha (songs of axe), los congos, la jaiba (the crab), and el chenche matriculado. The salve, which in the words of the U.S. ethnomusicologist Martha Davis, is the most typical of the traditional Dominican genres, has two styles: one distinctly Spanish, ametric and antiphonal, and another polyrhythmic, strongly hybridized between the Spanish and African styles. Among African instruments are the los palos (the sticks), balsié, and the gallumba.

Other Dominican musical instruments of African origin include the Palo mayor (mainmast), the canoita, los timbales (present in the bachata, also called bongos), and the tambora (key instrument in the merengue music, the Dominican national dance).

For its part, the bachata is a hybrid of the bolero (especially the bolero rhythm) of the Dominican Republic with other musical influences of African origin and other musical styles like the son, the merengue and the chachachá.

On the other hand, there are also Dominican music genres widespread across the country, whose origin is uncertain, being considered of Spanish and African origin, depending on musicologists and historians. Such is the case of merengue music. Luis Alberti, one of the musicians considered as fathers of merengue, thinks that the roots of this music genre are purely Spanish. F. Lizardo, Dominican folklorist, by contrast, thinks that this origin is in the Bara tribe of Madagascar, who came to the island in the eighteenth century and brought a dance called merengue that has spread throughout the Caribbean. A very similar pace, adds Lizardo, arrived today with the Yoruba of Dahomey. In the African polyrhythm was also the merengue. Also often linked to the origin of merengue a dance called URPA or UPA, a native of Havana and arrived in the Dominican Republic between 1838 and 1849. The dance sailed through the Caribbean coming to Puerto Rico where it was well received. One of the movements of this dance is called merengue which apparently is the way selected to call the dance, and came to the Dominican Republic where he evolved into the genre of merengue. However, the Cuban UPA is also a dance whose origin appears to be in West Africa. In fact, despite its rise among the masses, the upper class did not accept the merengue for long, apparently because of its connection with African music. Another cause that weighed on the repudiation and attacks the merengue were literary texts that accompany it, usually risqué.

Dominican folk music is intimately tied to religious culture, and interpreted primarily in the fiesta de santos (party of saints), also known, according to the area of the country, as velaciones (vigils), velas (candles) or noches de vela (sleepless nights). Other popular rhythms are of Spanish origin, such as the mangulina and the carabiné.

=== Fashion ===
The first Afro-Dominican models featured on the cover of Vogue Mexico are Licett Morillo, Manuela Sánchez, Annibelis Baez and Ambar Cristal Zarzuela for the September 2019 edition.

=== Religion ===
Although most black Dominicans are Roman Catholics, Protestants make up 21.3% of the population. Atypical magical-religious beliefs are practice among some black Dominicans. The most characteristic feature is the Dominican Vudú, which is generally considered taboo in mainstream Dominican society.

Funeral rites contain many features of African descent that are shared with other American countries. A typical example is the baquiní or velorio del angelito.

=== Institutions and cuisine ===
The economic field include various institutions of mutual aid, existing both in the fields and in the cities. In rural areas, these institutions are in the form of groups of farmers who come together to collaborate on certain agricultural tasks such as planting, clearing of forests, land preparation, etc. are called juntas (boards) or convites and have similar characteristics to Haitian combite closely related to the dokpwe of the Fon people of Dahomey. These tasks are accompanied by songs and musical instruments that serve as encouragement and coordination at work. All board members are required to reciprocate the assistance and collaboration in the work of others. After the day is a festival that is the responsibility of the landowner.

Some Dominican cuisine and dishes contain some products of African origin. Among the former are the guandul, the ñame and the funde. Typical African dishes seem to be the mangú, prepared with green plantains and derivatives cocola kitchen, the fungí and the calalú. A common drink among the black slaves was the guarapo, made of sugar cane juice.

=== Buildings ===
African slaves were forced to build a cathedral that in time became the oldest in America. They built their monastery, first hospital and the Alcázar de Colón. In the 1540s, the Spanish authorities ordered the African slaves to build a wall to defend the city from attacks by pirates who ravaged the islands. They also built the Puerta de las Lamentaciones (Gate of wailing).

== Racial discrimination and consciousness ==
As in most parts of the Americas the idea of black inferiority compared to the white race has been historically propagated due to the subjugation of African slaves. In the Dominican Republic, "blackness" is often associated with Haitian migrants and a lower class status. Those who possess more African-like phenotypic features are often victims of discrimination, and are seen as illegal foreigners. The Dominican dictator Rafael Leónidas Trujillo, who governed between 1930 and 1961, tenaciously promoted an anti-Haitian sentiment and used racial persecution and nationalistic fervor against Haitian migrants. An envoy of the UN in October 2007 found that there was racism against blacks in general, and particularly against Haitians, which proliferate in every segment of Dominican society. The ebook, Spirals in the Caribbean : representing violence and connection in Haiti and the Dominican Republic by Sophie Maríñez, explores the colonial and imperial legacies of violence in the Caribbean through a new interpretive framework, taking as central material the literature, history, and cultural productions of both Haiti and the Dominican Republic and making several fundamental arguments. Maríñez, Sophie. Spirals in the Caribbean : Representing Violence and Connection in Haiti and the Dominican Republic, University of Pennsylvania Press, 2024. ProQuest Ebook Central, http://ebookcentral.proquest.com/lib/montclair/detail.action?docID=30746999.

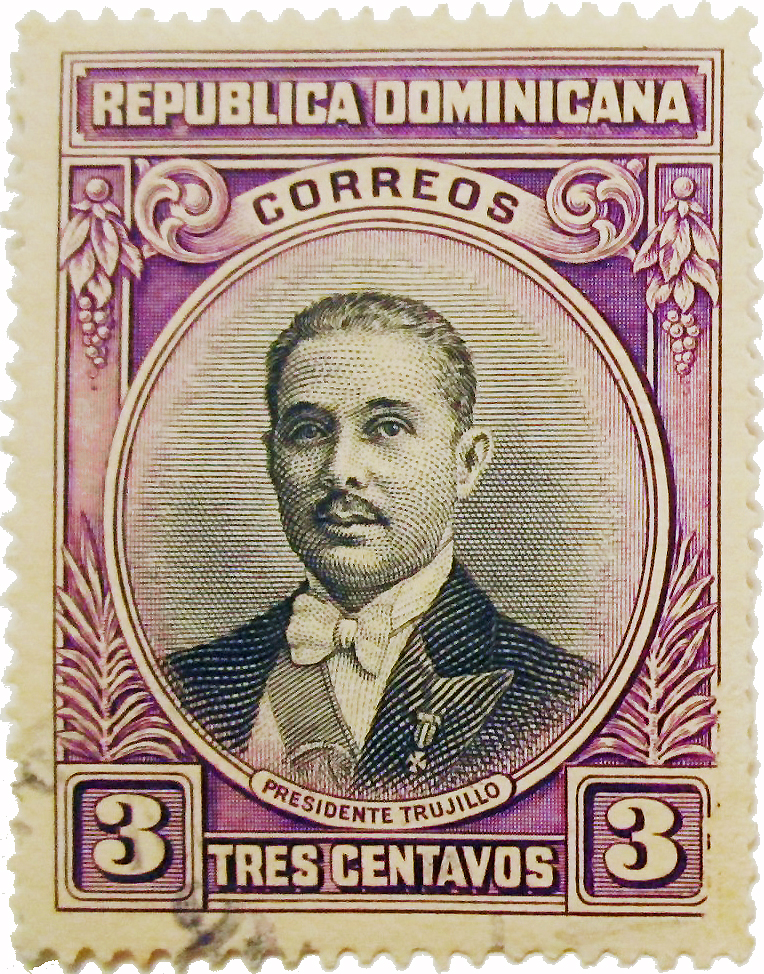
Rafael Trujillo

According to census reports the majority, 73% identify as "Mestizo" or "Indio", Mestizo meaning mixed race of any type of mix, unlike in other countries of the Americas countries where it denotes solely a European and Indigenous mix, and Indio slang for mulatto in Dominican Republic. Most Dominicans acknowledge their obvious Mulatto racial mix, oftentimes with slight Taino admixture along with the already heavy African and European. However, even though the majority of Dominicans recognize their mixed race background, many Dominicans often think "less" of their African side in comparison to the European and even much smaller Taino. Many Dominicans (men and women) often prefer lighter romantic partners because of the more European features and to "Mejorar la raza" (better the race) in regards to starting a family.

Due to the influence of European colonization and the propagation of Africans or "darker people" as being of the lowest caste, having African ancestry is often not desired in the Dominican Republic, which can also be said of many other parts of the Americas America and even the United States, where African American men often prefer "lightskinned" mixed Mulatto looking women, as well as Africa and the Caribbean, where blacks often bleach their skin. Approximately 80% of Dominicans are of mixed racial ancestry and few people self-identify as being black. In Dominican Republic, racial categories differ significantly from that in North America. In the United States, the one-drop rule applies in such that if a person has any degree of African blood in them they are considered black. Which is seen as inaccurate from people in the Dominican Republic and many other countries in the Americas countries, as Mulattos have just as much European ancestry as African. In other countries of the Americas there is more flexibility in how people racially categorize themselves. In the Dominican Republic a person who has some degree of black ancestry can identify as non-black if appearance wise they can pass of as being another racial category or is racially ambiguous.

Socio-economic status also heavily influences race classification in the country and tends to be correlated with whiteness. In the Dominican Republic, those of higher social status tend to be predominately of a lighter color tone as are often labeled as 'blanco/a', 'trigueño/a', or 'indio/a', while poorer people tend to be 'moreno/a', 'negro/a, or 'prieto/a', the latter category being heavily associated with Haitian migrants. Ramona Hernández, director of the Dominican Studies Institute at City College of New York asserts that the terms were originally a defense against racism: "During the Trujillo regime, people who had dark skin were rejected, so they created their own mechanism to fight against the rejection".

=== Haitian diaspora ===
Haitians represent the largest minority of black foreigners in the country. Historically, the two Hispaniolan nations have had a strained relationship over political, economic and cultural topics. In contemporary times, the Dominican Republic has faced numerous accusations of human rights violations by several international organizations.

== Notable people ==
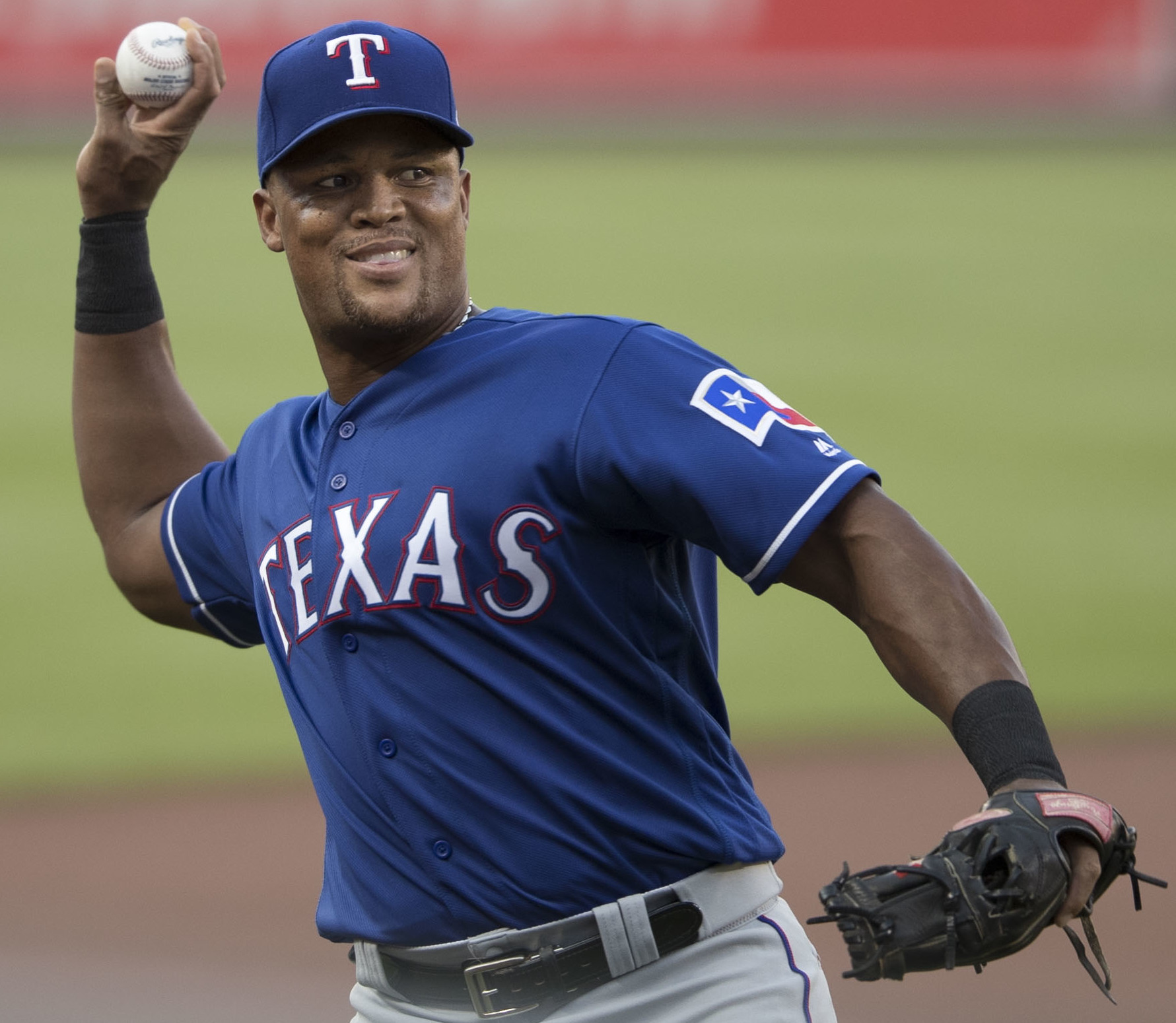
Adrián Beltré Pérez, professional baseball player.

- Marcos Evangelista Adón, 19th-independence leader and founder of La Victoria.
- José Alberto "El Canario", singer
- Sandy Alcántara, baseball player
- Anaís, singer
- Aurora Arias, writer
- Darializa Avila Chevalier, activist and politician
- Edison Azcona, footballer
- Alejandro Balde, footballer
- Alberto Baldé, footballer
- Santiago Basora, 19th-century military leader and independence activist
- Celsa Albert Batista, author and historian
- Josefina Baez, dancer and poet
- Sonia Báez-Hernández, artist
- Israel Boatwright, footballer
- José Cabrera, 19th-century soldier and independence activist
- Diego del Ocampo, 16th-century maroon leader
- Erick Japa, footballer
- Josefina Báez, actress
- Adrián Beltré, former MLB baseball player
- El Canario, singer
- Robinson Canó, MLB baseball player
- Aquiles Correa, actor and comedian
- Elly De La Cruz, MLB baseball player
- Olivorio Mateo, guerrilla fighter and Vudú healer
- Luiyi de Lucas, footballer
- Tony Dandrades, journalist
- Elibeidy Dani, model
- Ramón Isidro Ditrén Díaz, writer
- Mariano Díaz, footballer
- Fanum, streamer
- J Noa, rapper
- Jandy Feliz, musician
- Junior Firpo, footballer
- Xiomara Fortuna, musician and folklorist
- Julito Fulcar, politician and professor
- Petronila Gaú, heroine in the Battle of Sabana Larga
- Gregorio Urbano Gilbert, guerrilla fighter
- Petronila Angélica Gómez, teacher and feminist
- Kat González, footballer
- Maximiliano Gómez, militant
- Peter González, footballer
- Vladimir Guerrero, former MLB baseball player
- Vladimir Guerrero Jr., MLB baseball player
- Joan Guzman, former professional boxer
- Yolanda Guzmán, revolutionary and martyr of the April Revolution
- Tatico Henríquez, musician
- Al Horford, NBA basketball player
- Esteban Hotesse, Tuskegee Airmen member during World War II
- Isabelle, singer
- Blas Jiménez, poet
- Luz del Alba Jiménez, politician
- Sebastián Lemba, 16th-century slave rebellion leader
- Otto Lopez, baseball player
- Sessilee Lopez, model
- Marco Luciano, MLB baseball player
- Eutimio Mambí, 19th-century independence leader
- Felipe Mañón, 19th-century independence activist and politician
- Juan Marichal, former MLB baseball player
- Pedro Martínez, former MLB baseball player
- Fausto Mata, actor and comedian
- Bayron Matos, football player
- Luis Manuel Medina, journalist and radio show host
- Jasminne Mendez, writer and author
- Manuel Mendez, 19th-century independence activist and politician
- Ralph Mercado, businessman
- Sixto Minier, folklorst and leader of the Congos of Villa Mella movement
- Lineisy Montero, model
- Manuel Mora, 19th-century soldier and revolutionary
- Mateo Morrison, writer and lawyer
- Milton Morrison, writer and politician
- Monkey Black, rapper
- Juan Nouesí, fighter in the Dominican Restoration War
- Manuel Núñez, writer and historian
- Victor Núñez, footballer
- José Núñez-Melo, politician
- Ruth Ocumárez, model
- Omega, singer
- Sergia Galván Ortega, activist and educator
- David Ortiz, former MLB baseball player
- Ozuna, rapper
- Alfredo Pacheco, politician
- Quirino Paulino, former military chief and narcotics boss
- Olivia Peguero, painter
- Chichí Peralta, musician and bandleader
- Eladio Perez, politician
- Loida Maritza Pérez, writer
- Valentin Medrano Pérez, politician and teacher
- Marianela Pinales, lawyer and activist
- Eusebio Puello, 19th-century soldier and general
- Gabino Puello, 19th-century military leader
- José Joaquín Puello, 19th-century independence leader and politician
- EmmaKings, singer and baseball player
- Agustín Ramírez, baseball player
- Dania Ramirez, actress
- Fausto Rey, singer
- Judy Reyes, actress
- Yaritza Reyes, actress and beauty pageant queen
- Fernando Rodney, MLB baseball player
- Dorny Romero, footballer
- Nelson de la Rosa, actor
- Marcos del Rosario Mendoza, hero of the Cuban War of Independence
- María Trinidad Sánchez, 19th-century independence activist
- Santaye, singer
- Antony Santos, musician
- Rafael Corporán de los Santos, politician and philanthropist
- Yoskar Sarante, singer
- Sexappeal, singer
- Alfonso Soriano, former MLB baseball player
- Arlenis Sosa, model
- Juan Soto, MLB baseball player
- Sammy Sosa, former MLB baseball player
- Josefina Stubbs, politician
- Frank Suero, actor and comedian
- Juan Suero, 19th-century military commander
- Tokischa, rapper
- Mamá Tingó, activist
- Ramón Tolentino, journalist
- Joao Urbáez, footballer
- Cuco Valoy, musician
- Sergio Vargas, musician
- Johnny Ventura, musician, politician
- Ronaldo Vásquez, footballer
- Ambar Cristal Zarzuela, model
- Jorge Radhamés Zorrilla Ozuna, lawyer and politician

== See also ==
- Slavery in colonial Spanish America
- Atlantic slave trade
- Afro-Latin Americans
- Black Hispanic and Latino Americans
- Slave rebellion
- Maroons
- Freedman
- Emancipados
- Dominican people
- Racism in the Dominican Republic
- Mixed Dominicans
