= Samaná English =

Variety of the English language spoken in the Samaná Peninsula, Dominican Republic

- Samaná Peninsula English
- Native to: Dominican Republic
- Region: Samaná Peninsula
- Ethnicity: Samaná Americans
- Native speakers: 12,200 (1950)
- Language family: Indo-European: Germanic; West Germanic; North Sea Germanic; Anglo–Frisian; Anglic; English; North American English; American English; Older Southern American English; African-American Vernacular English; Samaná English
- Writing system: Latin (English alphabet)

Language codes
- ISO 639-3: –
- Glottolog: None
- Linguasphere: 52-ABA-clt

Samaná English (SE and SAX) is a variety of the English language spoken by descendants of Black immigrants from the United States who have lived in the Samaná Peninsula, now in the Dominican Republic. Members of the enclave are known as the Samaná Americans.

The language is a relative of African Nova Scotian English, or also as a derivative of African-American Vernacular English (AAVE), with variations unique to the enclave's history in the area. In the 1950 Dominican Republic census, 0.57% of the population (about 12,200 speakers) said that their mother tongue was English.

== Immigration ==
Most speakers trace their lineage to immigrants who arrived at the peninsula in 1824 and 1825. At the time all of Hispaniola was administered by Haiti, and its president was Jean-Pierre Boyer. The immigrants responded to an invitation for settlement that Jonathas Granville had delivered in person to Philadelphia, Baltimore, Boston, and New York City. Abolitionists like Richard Allen, Samuel Cornish, Benjamin Lundy, and Loring D. Dewey joined the campaign, which was coined the Haitian emigration.

The response was unprecedented, as thousands of African Americans boarded ships in eastern cities and migrated to Haiti. Most of the immigrants arrived during the fall of 1824 and the spring of 1825. More continued moving back and forth in later years but at a slower rate.

Between 1859 and 1863, another immigration campaign brought new settlers to the island but at a fraction of the number in 1824 and 1825. Those who originally settled in Samaná were fewer than 600 but formed the only surviving immigration enclave.

== Survival ==
While more than 6,000 immigrants came in 1824 and 1835, by the end of the 19th century, only a handful of enclaves on the island spoke any variety of the antebellum Black Vernacular. They were communities in Puerto Plata, Samaná and Santo Domingo. The largest was the one in Samaná that maintained church schools, where it was preserved.

Enclaves across the island soon lost an important element of their identity, which led to their disintegration. Samaná English withstood the assaults in part because the location of Samaná was favorable to a more independent cultural life. However, government policies have still influenced the language's gradual decline, and it may well now be an endangered language.

== Similarities with other languages ==
Samana English is similar to that of Caribbean English creole spoken by the English speaking Caribbean. Samana English is related to Bahamian and Turks and Caicos Islands Creole due to same origins.

== See also ==
- 1873 Dominican Republic Samaná Peninsula referendum
