= Martha Ellen Davis =

American anthropologist and ethnomusicologist

Martha E. Davis
- Presenting a paper in Santo Domingo
- Occupations: Anthropologist, Ethnomusicologist
- Awards: Charles Seeger Prize (1970), Chicago Folklore Prize (1976), Premio Nacional de Ensayo Pedro Henríquez Ureña (1985)

Martha Ellen Davis is an emeritus professor from the University of Florida, anthropologist and ethnomusicologist known for her multifarious work on African diasporic religion and music. Professor Davis' research has defied conventional tenets about Haitian and Dominican folk music, and her cultural preservation projects has raised awareness of the significance of the Samaná Americanos' enclave.

== Education and early work ==
Davis received her B.A. (Magna Cum Laude) in Anthropology from the University of California and a Ph.D. from the University of Illinois. Her graduate field work took her to various Caribbean islands, of which she has published, but it was in the Dominican Republic where early on in her graduate career she established her reputation as an iconoclast, critic and dedicated scholar to Black culture. In 1972, she arrived at the island of Hispaniola with the suspicion that Dominicans owned more to the Afro-Caribbean culture than what had been documented yet. In an article published in a leading Dominican newspaper, Xiomarita Perez wrote candidly about Davis' style and links to the country: "Martha works from the heart and with the heart... Her job is essential to the country's social memory" (Spanish:«Martha trabaja de corazón y con el corazón... Su oficio es delicado e importante para la memoria social del país»).

== Institutional involvement ==
Part of Davis' legacy includes co-founding the Committee of Applied Ethnomusicology within the Society for Ethnomusicology in 1998, writing four seminal books, producing documentaries, and writing numerous scientific articles. She has been considered an authority in Afro-Caribbean music and is quoted extensively in the literature. Davis' book, La otra ciencia, earned the National Nonfiction Award of the Dominican Republic. While continuing as an affiliate professor at the University of Florida, since ca. 2003 Davis has spent most of her time in the Dominican Republic as honorary researcher of the Museo del Hombre Dominicano (Museum of the Dominican Man) and oral-history expert and researcher of the Archivo General de la Nación (The National Archives), offering lectures, advising young scholars, and writing. On November 1, 2012, the Museo celebrated her 40 years of research in the country.

== Scholarly contributions ==
Davis' long-standing interest in the Dominican and Haitian cultures derives from her belief that "The island of Hispaniola—the Spanish colony of Santo Domingo and first colony in the New World—was the initial diasporal crucible and cultural bridge of the Americas." In 1976, Davis, who rivals Fernando Ortiz in years of research into Afro-Caribbean culture, challenged the Dominican cultural establishment. According to Peter Manuel from CUNY, she convincingly suggested "that if there is any rightful 'national' music of the Dominican Republic, it would be not the Merengue, with its specifically regional origin in the Cibao, but rather the various types of salve, which have flourished throughout the country." Her work has also crossed into the realm of religion, and here she also suggested that what is commonly called Dominican "Folk Religion" is more accurately described as folk Catholicism of which one component is "Dominican Vodou".

== Select publications ==
- 1972 "The social organization of a musical event: The fiesta de cruz in San Juan, Puerto Rico." Ethnomusicology 16 (1): 38-62.
- 1975 "The changing role of the Dulzainero in León, Spain." The Journal of American Folklore 88 (349): 245-53.
- 1980 That Old-time Religion: Tradicion y Cambio en el Enclave Americano de Samana." Boletin del Museo del Hombre Dominicano Saint-Domingue 9, (14): 165-196.
- 1980 Aspectos de la influencia africana en la musica tradicional dominicana. Santo Domingo, República Dominicana: Museo del Hombre Dominicano
- 1980 "La Cultura Musical Religiosa de Los Americanos de Samana." Boletin Del Museo Del Hombre Dominicano Saint-Domingue 9 (15): 127–69.
- 1981 "Voces del purgatorio: estudio de la salve dominicana." Santo Domingo, República Dominicana: Museo del Hombre Dominicano.
- 1981 "Himnos y Anthems (Coros) de los americanos de Samana: Contextos y Estilos." Boletin del Museo del Hombre Dominicano 10(16): 85-107.
- 1983 "Cantos de esclavos y libertos: cancionero de anthems (coros) de Samaná." Boletín del Museo del Hombre Dominicano 18: 197-236.
- 1987 "'native bi-musicality:' case studies from the Caribbean." Pacific Review of Ethnomusicology 4 : 39-55.
- 1987 La otra ciencia : el vodú dominicano como religión y medicina populares. Santo Domingo, República Dominicana : Editora Universitaria, UASD.
- 1992 "Careers, 'alternative Careers,' and the Unity Between Theory and Practice in Ethnomusicology." Ethnomusicology 36 (3): 361–87. doi:10.2307/851869.
- 1994 "'Bi-Musicality' in the Cultural Configurations of the Caribbean" Black Music Research Journal 14 (2): 145-60.
- 1996 Vodú of the Dominican Republic. Gainesville, FL: ETHNICA Publications, 1996.
- 2001 "Overview of Caribbean music." The Journal of the Acoustical Society of America 110, no. 5 (2001): 2672-2672.
- 2002 "An antidote to crisis: Exploring the colombian musical diaspora in miami." Hemisphere: 4.
- 2002 "Dominican folk dance and the shaping of national identity." Caribbean dance from Abakuá to Zouk: How movement shapes identity (2002): 127-151.
- 2003 (with Miguel Fernández, Arturo Guzmán, Pericles Mejía and Manuel Segura) Papá Liborio el santo vivo de Maguana. Gainesville, FL: Ethnica Publications
- 2004 La ruta hacia Liborio: mesianismo en el sur profundo dominicano. Santo Domingo, República Dominicana: UNESCO and Secretaría de Estado de Cultura, 2004. ISBN 9993496073
- 2004 (with Miguel Fernández, Arturo Guzmán, and Amauta De Marco) The Dominican Southwest : Crossroads of Quisqueya and center of the world. Gainesville, Fla: Ethnica Publications
- 2007 "Vodú of the dominican republic: Devotion to "la veintiuna división." Afro - 'Hispanic Review 26 (1): 75.
- 2007 (with Jovanny Guzmán, and Norma Urraca de Martínez) "Vodú of the Dominican Republic: Devotion to" La Veintiuna División"." Afro-Hispanic Review (2007): 75-90.
- 2007 "Asentamiento Y Vida Económica de Los Inmigrantes Afroamericanos de Samaná: Testimonio de La Profesora Martha Willmore (Leticia)." Boletín Del Archivo General de La Nación 31 (119): 709-734
- 2011 Les Tambours Palos de la Republique Dominicaine. Archivo General de la Nación (Dominican Republic) & University of Florida; Médiathèque Caraïbe / Conseil Général de la Guadeloupe
- 2011 "¿Existe un pensamiento antropológico Dominicano?"
- 2011 Davis, Martha Ellen. "La Historia de Los Inmigrantes Afro-Americanos Y Sus Iglesias En Samaná Según El Reverendo Nehemiah Willmore." Boletín Del Archivo General de La Nación 36 (129): 237–45.
- 2012 "Diasporal Dimensions of Dominican Folk Religion and Music". Black Music Research Journal 32 (1): 161 – 191.
