= Cocolo =

Caribbean term for non-Hispanic African descendants

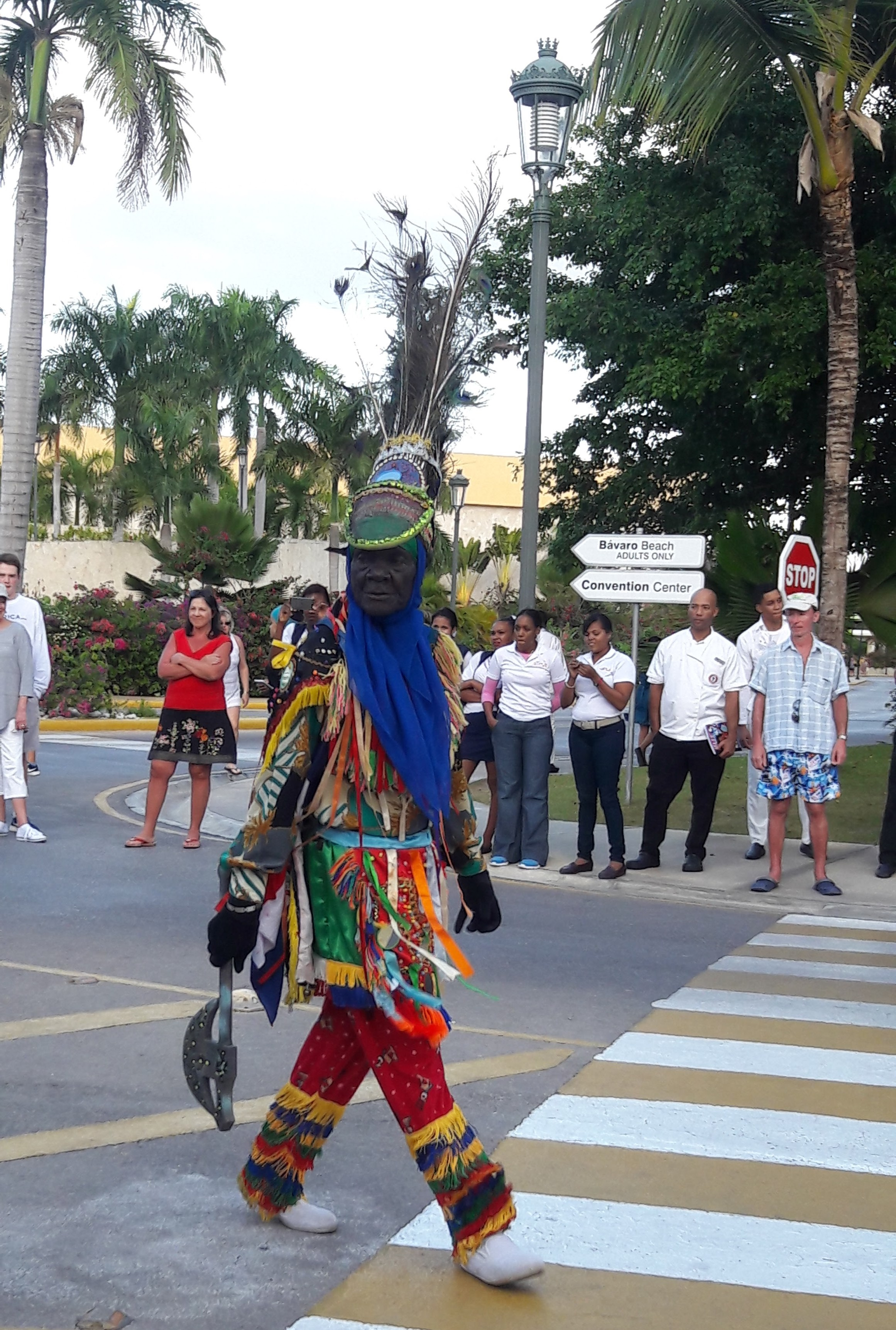
Guloya during carnival from San Pedro de Macorís, Dominican Republic a descendant of the black cocolos who emigrated to this city.

Cocolo is a term used in the Hispanic Caribbean to refer to Afro-Caribbean migrant descendants. The term originated in the Dominican Republic and is historically used to refer to the Anglophone Caribbean immigrants and their descendants and more rarely, towards those from the Francophone Caribbean. It is mainly used to refer to the migrants in San Pedro de Macorís, Puerto Plata, the Samaná Peninsula, and other Afro-descendants who arrived in the Atlantic coastal areas of the country in the late 1800s and early 1900s. At the time these migrants were culturally distinct from the lighter Dominicans who primarily lived in the northern interior of the country and had a high degree of colonial European ancestry.

The usage, outside the specific ethnicity of the Cocolos of San Pedro de Macorís, is vague, and at times the word can mean all black or all poorer people of any race living in less developed coastal areas. It can also be used to refer to those who identify with the Afro-Latino culture and music, such as palos, salsa and other Spanish Afro-Caribbean musical genres. The term is often used with pride to refer to oneself, yet can be taken as an insult when others use it.

== History ==
The immigration of Cocolos began in the late 1800s with the rise and development of the sugar industry in the Dominican Republic, although immigrants are preferably placed in coastal communities with active ports (Sánchez, Samaná, Monte Cristi, Puerto Plata). The main Dominican ports were in the "North Band" so that a large majority of these immigrants came from the Bahamas and the Turks, especially in Puerto Plata, due to proximity. Many also came from Saint Kitts and Nevis, Dominica, Antigua, Anguilla, St. Vincent, Montserrat, Tortola, St. Croix, St. Thomas, Martinique, and Guadeloupe.

The first Turks and Caicos Islander immigrants began arriving in Puerto Plata after the Dominican War of Restoration, long before the modern sugar industry was established. There were carpenters, blacksmiths and schoolteachers who emigrated due to the economic crisis in the Bahamas and Turks and Caicos. Many also came as stevedores on the Clyde Steamship Company boat line, which dominated trade for many years. When the railroad of Puerto Plata-Santiago was built in the late 19th century, many came from these islands to work on the railroad as well as others from Saint Thomas, which was then a Danish colony. These people also settled in large numbers in Puerto Plata.

== Culture ==
Since the Dominican Republic was a predominantly Hispanic Roman Catholic nation, the Cocolos thus needed to establish their own religious, social, and community centers. These were of various sects and were mainly founded in La Romana, Puerto Plata and San Pedro de Macorís.

Protestant denominations that were introduced by Cocolos include the Anglican Church, established in 1897 in San Pedro de Macorís, and now known as the Dominican Episcopal Church; Apostolic Faith, which began operations in 1930; the Moravian Church (now Evangelical Dominican Church) established in 1907 in San Pedro de Macorís; and the African Methodist Episcopal Church, which began their services in San Pedro de Macoris.

West Indian immigrants and their descendants also introduced some sports of British origin, namely cricket and boxing. In order to cultivate a following, the Cocolos created various sports groups in San Pedro de Macorís. Over time the descendants of those West Indian immigrants began to abandon the practice of cricket and took up sports like baseball and basketball instead.

== Other uses ==
In the United States, particularly in the Northeast, the term has been used by Dominican migrants from the Cibao region to refer to African Americans. The word also became popular in Puerto Rico, where it was similarly used to refer to the Anglo-Caribbean, Black slaves who were brought to Puerto Rico in the 1800s during the sugar boom. In 1937, it only meant Black in Puerto Rico, however, the term cocolo would later become a slang term describing the subculture which followed Afro-Latino music, especially salsa as opposed to rock music (those were called rockeros). In the Puerto Rico of the late 1970s and early 1980s, the rivalry between cocolos and rockeros was similar to the rivalry between the Mods and the Rockers in 1960s England.

== See also ==
- Afro-Dominicans
- Samaná Americans
- Raizals
