= Marianela Pinales =

Dominican lawyer, public official and activist

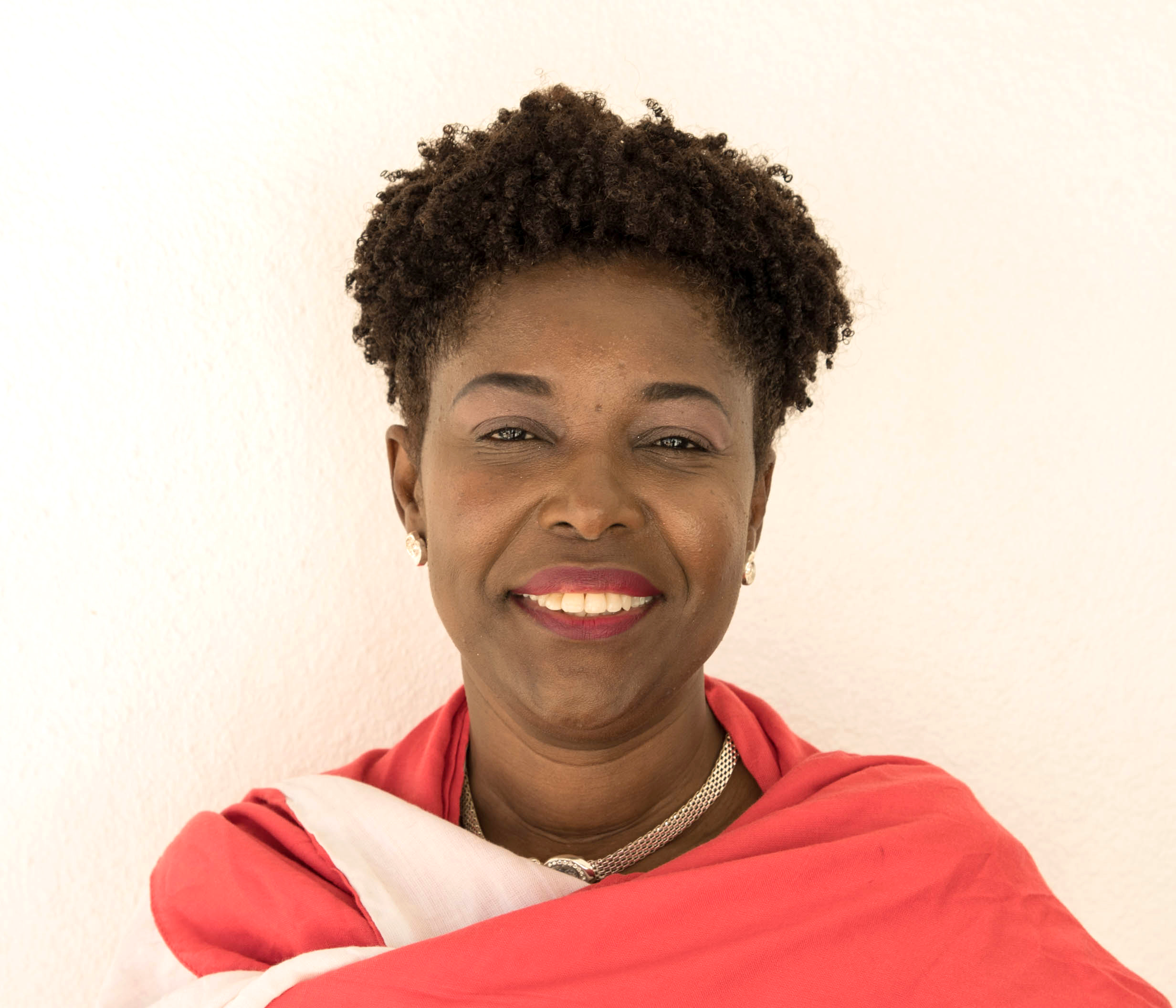
- Born: 9 January 1972 (age 54); Distrito Nacional, Dominican Republic
- Occupations: Lawyer, public official

Marianela Pinales (born 9 January 1972) is a Dominican lawyer, public official, and activist.

== Biography ==
Marianela Pinales was born in the Distrito Nacional on 9 January 1972.

In 2013, she was part of the technical team for the Dominican Ministry of Economy's 2010–2030 National Development Strategy, contributing plans for decentralization and government locales.

She led the Gender Equity Division at the Dominican Ministry of External Relations. Later, she was part of the Council for State Reform (CONARE).

She became head of the Ministry of Education's Directorate of Gender Equity and Development in February 2017. She was fired on 25 March 2019 within hours after launching the campaign '"Neither Good Hair Nor Bad Hair" campaign'.

== Activism ==
On 25 March 2019, Pinales appeared in a public service announcement to launch a campaign titled Ni pelo bueno ni pelo malo (Neither Good Hair Nor Bad Hair). It was intended to normalize the wearing of curly and natural hair by Afro-Dominican schoolchildren. In the ad, she states, "no boy or girl should be discriminated against because of their physical appearance."

Hours after it aired, Pinales was abruptly fired from her position at the Ministry of Education. A Ministry spokesman denied that the dismissal was due to the campaign (though he said it had been launched without official consent), stating that Pinales had been absent from work for 30 days. Pinales refuted this, citing several official functions she had attended during that time, including the 63rd session of the United Nations Commission on the Status of Women in New York.

I have my card. I have all the evidence. I was even at that event with the Minister for Women and I have photographs with Janet Camilo, who is a witness that I was working with the Ministry of Education during all that time.

She also stated that she had not been paid for the month of March. The firing was criticized by some media outlets for being racially motivated.

Pinales addressed students during a celebration of International Women's Day at the Instituto Técnico Superior Comunitario in 2021, advocating for "a dismantling of the construction of masculinity that allows more just and equitable relationships between men and women, so that the female sex gets the opportunities it deserves."
