= Yolanda Guzmán (militant) =

Dominican militant and a leader in the April Revolution of 1965

Yolanda Guzmán (July 8, 1943 – May 2, 1965) was a Dominican revolutionary, trade unionist and neighborhood leader. She opposed the dictatorship of Rafael Trujillo, which lasted until his assassination in 1961. She fought valiantly in the later conflicts that erupted the nation in turmoil, in which she was murdered during the April Revolution.

== Biography ==
Yolanda Guzmán was born in Jaiba on July 8, 1943, daughter of Carlos María Paulino Fernández and Beatriz Guzmán. Her mother, unable to provide for her daughter at that time, left her in the countryside with her parents, Enemencio Guzmán Luna and María Jacinta Bautista, and came to the capital in 1944 to work as a domestic. She brought her back in 1946. “I raised her washing, ironing, making arepa (corn cakes) and selling mabí,” says the lady. Guzmán studied at the Julia Molina school (today in Uruguay) and at the Liceo México (United States).

In 1962, she married Rafael Andrés García and they had a daughter, Ruth Elizabeth, who died at seven months old. Her husband, who worked as Inspector of the Presidency in the government of Juan Bosch, died of a heart attack on September 12, 1963.

Since then, Yolanda, who as a single woman frequented the Juan Pablo Duarte Social and Cultural club, began to fight for workers and later joined the voices demanding a return to constitutionality after the coup d'état against President Juan Bosch.

“From a very young age, she showed an inclination towards politics, inspired by her mother, who was anti-Trujillo and listened to Cuban clandestine radio stations,” says Florencia, the sister who accompanied Yolanda in her youthful hobbies and at political demonstrations.

Doña Beatriz was his confidant, secretary and assistant. He told her about his plans for the outbreak of the revolution, he made her deliveries for the political prisoners he visited in La Victoria and he put her in charge of preparing food that he took to the armed commandos.

Florencia says that the brutal murder of the Mirabal sisters during the Trujillo regime sparked indignation in her sister, who swore: “I am going to dedicate myself to fighting, we have to free ourselves from this regime.” She adds that “when the PRD arrived in the country on July 5, 1961, she was one of the first to register with Conde 13. From then on, she was an activist, a militant. She met José Francisco Peña Gómez with whom she swore the oath of office in the committees of Gualey and Las Cañitas. She participated in the march of women dressed in black protesting the overthrow of Bosch, she frequently visited prisons, helped single mothers get sewing machines, milk and bread for their children.”

They say that Don Manuel Fernández Mármol gave soap, sugar and food to the poor and prisoners and that Peña Gómez became a member of the family. “Peña was a son to me, he always helped me, he came to this little house until a few days before his death. If he were alive we would not be going through so much hardship,” says the long-suffering Doña Beatriz.

When Peña Gómez called on the people to take to the streets, she was one of the first to take part in the revolutionary feat of April 1965.

== Death ==
On May 2, 1965, while Francisco Alberto Caamaño was being sworn in as constitutionalist president, Yolanda Gúzmán, while encouraging the townspeople to take to the streets against the intervention forces, was returning in a jeep with Luis Reyes Acosta, José María Reyes Araujo, Rafael García Vásquez, Mario Taveras and her brother Narciso, who survived, they were intercepted at the corner of Marcos Adón and Pedro Livio Cedeño by the CEFA. From there they were taken to Transportation and then to Mata Redonda, where they were shot. They tried to remove the bodies, they say, "but they shot at every ambulance that approached and the townspeople buried them under the ground until an OAS commission dug them up and took them to the Gautier Hospital morgue.

Two months later, her mother was notified to identify her daughter. Doña Beatriz, still shaken by the shock, said: “I thought I was going to see her exactly the same, but what I found were her bare bones, not even her hair was visible. They held her wake at 6 16 de Agosto Street, where the constitutionalist commander Silvio Arzeno lived, and then a crowd dressed in black buried her in the cemetery on Independencia Avenue.”

== Honors ==
On October 9, 1965, the Santo Domingo City Council agreed to name the street that from Eusebio Manzueta to the South was called Manzana de Oro, and to the North El Progreso de Trujillo, after Yolanda Guzmán, in honor of the young fighter who gave her life for the sake of revolutionary ideals.

== See also ==
- Dominican Civil War
- Francisco Caamaño
- Juan Bosch

== Sources ==
- Quién fue Yolanda Guzmán
- Yolanda Guzmán
- Hoy en la historia: Muere Yolanda Guzmán
