= Aurora Arias =

Dominican writer

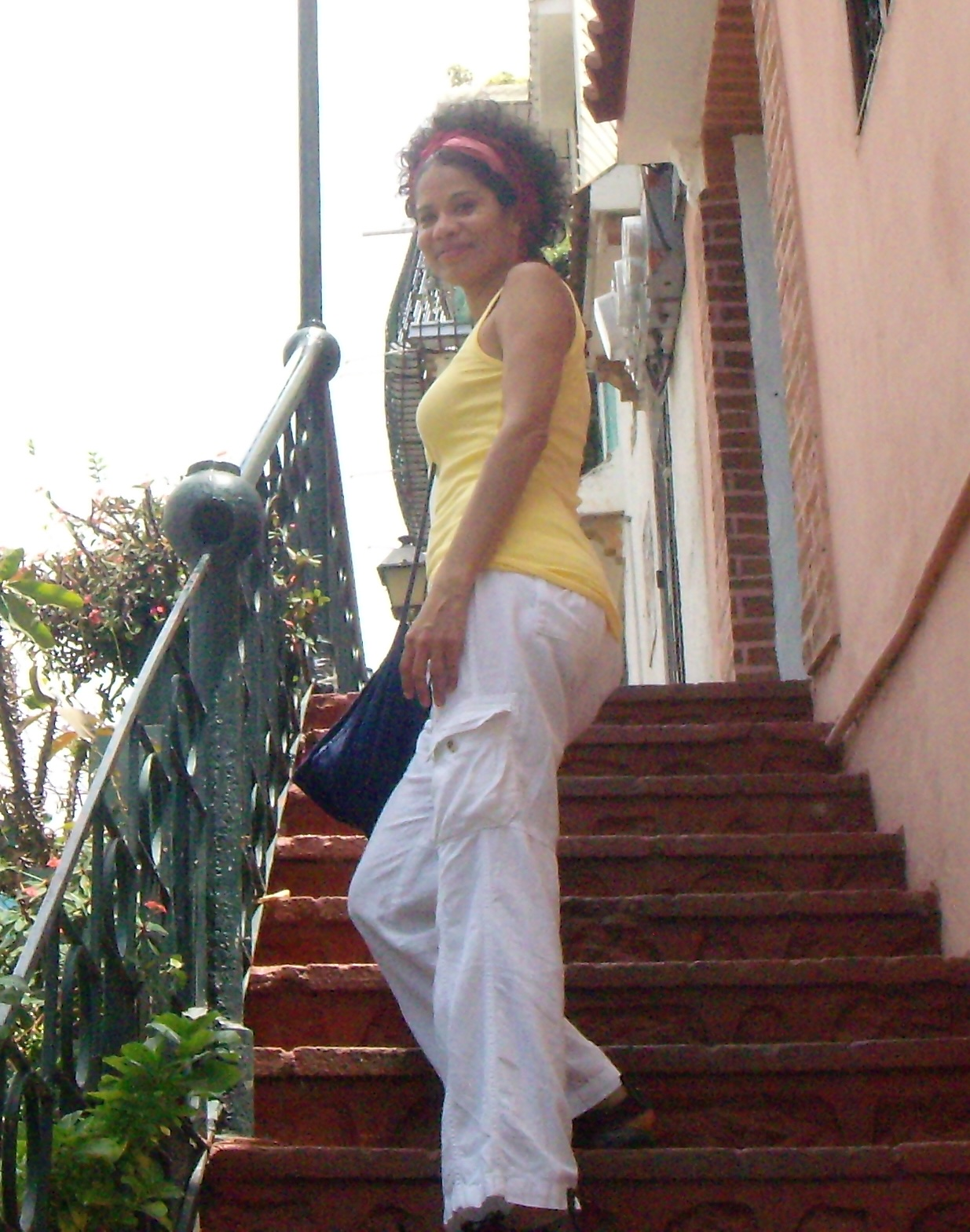
- Arias in 2013
- Born: April 22, 1962 (age 63); Santo Domingo, Dominican Republic
- Occupations: Writer; poet; journalist; astrologer

Aurora Arias, born April 22,1962 in Santo Domingo, is a writer and journalist from the Dominican Republic, and is also an astrologer.

== Biography ==
Aurora Arias was born in Santo Domingo on April 22, 1962. She is a writer, journalist, feminist, astrologer, and also has studied art and psychology. She has published poetry in books 'Vivienda de pájaros' (1986) y 'Piano Lila' (1994). She has also worked with prose fiction. In 1994 she won the prize of 'Tale of House of Theater' for the work Invy's Paradise. The Editorial of the 'University of Puerto Rico' published her collection of stories 'End of the world' in the year 2000.

She was co-editor of 'Quehaceres', a publication for 'Centro de Investigación para la Acción Femenina' (CIPAF), for which she worked from 1989 to 1996.

In relation to astrology, Aurora Arias maintains an astrological column titled "Astral Chart", in the magazine Uno since 1997.

== Awards ==
- 1994 Casa de Teatro short story award for "Invi's Paradise"

== Works ==
- Vivienda de pájaros (book of poems, 1986).
- Piano lila (book of poems, 1994).
- Invi's Paradise y otros relatos (1998).
- Fin de mundo y otros relatos (2000).
- Emoticons (2007).
- Parquecito (2011).
- Emoticons (reedition 2015).
