= Petronila Gaú =

Heroine of the Dominican War of Independence

Petronila Gaú was a Dominican activist who is recognized as a participant in Dominican War of Independence (1844–1856). She distinguished herself as a combatant in the Battle of Sabana Larga. When bullets for the rifles began to run out, during the battle, Petronila Gaú attacked the invading army with stones, earning the respect and recognition of her companions.

== Early years ==
Her date of birth is not known with certainty, but Monte Llano, a jurisdiction of Sabaneta (current province of Santiago Rodríguez) is recognized as her birthplace. According to the last Spanish governor, José de la Gándara, Sabaneta, located in the border area, had a population of six thousand inhabitants. At the time of the liberation battles, Petronila Gaú was dedicated to cultivating the land with her family.

== Dominican War of Independence ==
She participated directly in the battles using the rifle, as part of the troops commanded by the Military Chief of the Northern Border Luis Franco Bidó, in the Battle of Sabana Larga, the decisive and last battle against the Haitian army, under the direct orders of Colonel José Ungría. She also participated in the final assault in Sabana de Jácuba.

With her actions she helped save lives, because at the same time she was fighting, Petronila Gaú helped the wounded and encouraged the troops.

== Legacy ==
At the end of the war, she returned to her hometown where she continued her agricultural work. In honor of his heroism and bravery, today, a street in San Ignacio de Sabaneta is named after her.

== See also ==
- Battle of Sabana Larga
- Juana Saltitopa
- Maria Baltasara de los Reyes

== Bibliography ==
- García Lluberes, Alcides. Two Great Battles. CLIO, No. 110, April-June. Santo Domingo (RD). 1957.
- Ferreras, Ramón Alberto (1976). History of feminism in the Dominican Republic, Cosmos Editor.
- Ángela, Hernández, (2009). Women in Dominican history. Secretary of State for Women.
