= Samaná Americans =

Ethnic group descended from African Americans who settled on the Samaná Peninsula

Americanos de Samaná

Total population
- 8,000

Languages
- Samaná English, Dominican Spanish, Spanglish

Religion
- Christianity, Dominican Vudú

Related ethnic groups
- African Americans, Afro-Dominicans

Frederick Douglass addressing a crowd of Samaná Americans in Samaná, January 28, 1871. He stands on a pulpit borrowed from a nearby Catholic church.

The Samaná Americans (Spanish: Americanos de Samaná) are a minority cultural sub-group of African American descendants who inhabit the Samaná Province in the eastern region of Dominican Republic.

== History ==
Most of the Samaná Americans are descendants of African Americans who, beginning in 1824, fled their homelands to Hispaniola—then under Haitian occupation—benefiting from the Haitian emigration policy facilitated, in part, by the mulatto president Jean Pierre Boyer. Jonathas Granville traveled to the U.S. in May–June 1824 in response to a letter that Loring D. Dewey had sent to Boyer. While in the U.S., Granville met with other abolitionists, like Richard Allen, Samuel Cornish, and Benjamin Lundy to organize the campaign for what was coined the Haitian emigration. The result was successful, as more than 6,000 emigrants responded in less than a year. After that, however, the settlements met with multiple problems and many returned. However, many stayed, and between the 1840s and 1860s, they even joined the Dominican independence struggles against Haiti and Spain in the Independence and Restoration wars, respectively. Additionally, among those who stayed, enclaves in Puerto Plata and Santo Domingo were clearly evident by the time of Frederick Douglass's visit in 1871. But the most distinct of all the enclaves was the one in Samaná, which has survived until today. They constitute a recognizable and sizable cultural enclave and a few of its members are native Samaná English speakers. Aware of its distinctive heritage, the community, whose peculiar culture distinguishes them from the rest of Dominicans, refers to itself as Samaná Americans, and is referred to by fellow Dominicans as los americanos de Samaná.

== Cultural distinctiveness ==
Crucially, they maintain many elements of 19th-century African-American culture, such as their variety of African American English, cuisine, games, and community services associations. Cultural exchanges with other groups in the area, like the Samaná Haitian communities and the Spanish-speaking majority, have been inevitable. But for most of its history, the English-speaking enclave has kept to itself, favoring, instead, intermarriages and reciprocal relations with other Black immigrant groups that are also Protestant and English-speakers, like the so-called cocolos. This is due to the relative isolation of the community, which until the 20th century was accessible only by boat due to the lack of roads connecting them to the rest of the island. Most follow the African Methodist Episcopal and Wesleyan denominations that their ancestors brought with them to the island.

== Present day ==
While it is difficult to estimate the number of Samaná Americans today due to exogamy and emigration from the peninsula, the number of Samaná English speakers was once estimated to be around 8,000. Such numbers have decreased considerably as the linguists doing research in the community relate; a difficulty in finding SE speakers even among the elderly. No monolingual English speakers remain; all Samaná Americans who speak English also speak Spanish. As a result of the influence of mainstream Dominican culture (including compulsory Spanish-language education), many markers of their culture appear to be in decline.

== See also ==
- American Colonization Society
- American fugitives in Cuba
- Americo-Liberian people
- Colonization societies
- Confederados
- Haitian emigration
- Mascogos
- Mayorasgo de Koka
- Sierra Leone Creole people
- African-American diaspora
- Afro-Dominicans
