= Josefina Baez =

Dominican actress

Josefina Báez
- Born: La Romana, Dominican Republic
- Occupation: Actress
- Years active: 1986–present

Josefina Báez is a Dominican actress. She is the founder and present director of Ay Ombe Theatre Troupe (estd. 1986). She was born in La Romana and moved to New York when she was 12 years old. Once in New York, She lived in Washington Heights, a traditionally Dominican American neighborhood. Báez is best known for her performance texts Dominicanish, Comrade, Bliss Ain't Playing and Levente no. Yolayorkdominicanyork.

Báez describes herself as "a performer-writer-educator-director whose work explores the present and its encounters with the past and future." Báez has been involved with multiple theatre festivals and travels globally conducting Ay Ombe workshops and theatre retreats. She has also curated various exhibits of Dominican artists. She often writes about her bi-lingual and bi-cultural experiences. In her writing about her bi-cultural experiences, Báez chooses to view the different countries she has migrated to and from and the concept of borders as something different from just physical locations. This is something Báez discusses in an interview regarding her philosophy of El ni'e saying that, "El ni'e is. Border as a place, a meaning. Border as a place of being. More than limiting me, it is that space of creation." This view of borders represents Báez's transcendence of physical location; it is a common theme in her work and is something that allows her to discuss identity in a unique way.

== Works ==
=== Written ===
- Dominicanish (Translations to Bengali, Hindi, Italian, Portuguese, Russian, Spanish and Swedish)
- Dominicanish: a Performance Text. 2000
- Levente no. Yolayorkdominicanyork. I.Om.Be Press, 2012.
- Comrade, Bliss ain't playing. Latinarte, 2013. Its translations to Russian (by Olga Gak), Hindi (Reema Moudgil), Swedish (Maria Roddrick), Spanish (Marcela Reales Visbal), Portuguese (Cristiane Lírica) and Italian Arisleyda Dilone.
- Canto de Plenitud. Ay Ombe Theatre/ I.Om.Be Press, 2013.
- Why is my name Marysol? I.Om.Be Press/ Ay Ombe Theatre, 2013. (A children story)
- Latin in. Antología de autología. Ay Ombe Theatre/ I.Om.Be Press, 2013.
- Como la Una/Como Uma (in Spanish & Portuguese) Ay Ombe Theatre/ I.Om.Be Press, 2014.
- Dramaturgia I & II. I.Om.Be Press, 2014.
- As Is E: Textos reunidos. I.Om.Be Press, 2015. (An anthology)
- Carmen: FotonovelArte. I.Om.Be Press, 2020.

Báez's works have been published in Forward Motion Magazine (NYC), Brujula/Compass (Latin American Writers Institute (NYC)), Ventana Abierta (University of California), Tertuliando/Hanging Out (Anthology of Dominican women writers in New York), Vetas (Dominican Republic), Caribbean Connections: Moving North (NECA/Washington, Dominicanish (NYC) and the Beacon Press 2001 Anthology. .

Dominicanish had a performance life of 10 fruitful years. The text has also been translated into Bengali, Hindi, Italian, Portuguese, Russian, Spanish, and Swedish.

=== Themes ===
Báez's works are related to the communities that she belongs, mainly a penta-ocean that she swims up, down and around: her migrant-womanhood-working class-black-heart centric self. In her own interpretation:

Sound and silence movimiento y quietud

Movement and stillness sonidos silencios

All colors All textures las gamas de los colores

Swimming in all possibilities texturas melodias en encuentros posibles

A review of Comrade, Bliss ain't Playing describes the work as "an intimate journey dressed up with a beautiful vulnerability"

Pulitzer Prize winner Junot Díaz has said of Báez:

Josefina Báez has been breaking open hearts and re-ordering minds for more years than I care to count. She is one of North America's finest artists and she is, without question, one of my favorite writers. She is a sword bathed in flame, she's a marvel. Levente no.Yolayorkdominicanyork is her finest work yet.

Báez uses her writing and performance to make several comments on race and identity, embracing her blackness and her Dominican heritage. Additionally, she also acknowledges her identities of being an immigrant and trans-migrant, themes common in her writing and performances. When a Dominican migrates to the United States, they are then neither considered fully Dominican or American. The individual is then considered to only partially belong to both cultures, creating an "in-betweenness." Modern understanding of transcultural identity explains this notion further. The idea of transcultural identity is that one embraces all of the localities an individual stems from and that these are permanently molding characteristics of any individual. The point has been made that by actively embracing where one's been regardless of where one is can come with a sense of otherness for individuals who adopt transcultural identities. By embracing and expressing her many identities and using her performances to share them, she is resisting America's attempt to marginalize her experience. Despite living in New York City, a racially and culturally diverse setting, Báez and other immigrants still feel the struggle everyday of not being accepted. This struggle is something that Báez recognizes in her work and in exploring her immigration and the new life she lives in New York and the struggles that comes with it, she is able to develop her performance of transcultural identity.

The concept of transnational barrios and the adaptation to new sociocultural environments is explored in her work, A 1 2 3 Portrait of a Legend, in which a Ciguapa, a mythical creature from Dominican Republic folklore, migrates to New York City. In the poem, the Ciguapa serves as an allegory for Báez herself and any other Dominican immigrants looking for a better life. However, as argued by Emilia Maria Duran-Almarza, an associate Professor at the Universidad de Oviedo, "In the process of adapting to the hectic urban life, Ciguapa undergoes a sociocultural metamorphosis that involves a radical change… in the nature of her divinity. No longer a goddess, and pulled by what the narrative voice identifies as an inescapable assimilation force, her feet take human form…". This can be observed in the excerpt from the poem:

"Our deity Ciguapa arrived in New York too.

The subway steps changed her nature. In the ups and down to and

from the

silver-grey fast worms, her feet became as everybody else's in the

rush hour crowd.

She did not notice the drastic change.

This was the first sign of assimilation

-a concept not to be understood but experienced."

Just as Ciguapa loses its deity becoming human, many Dominican immigrants such as Báez herself lose their cultures, belief systems, and ways of living as they are forced to assimilate in the "name of progress". These themes of alienation and estrangement are present through many of her works.

=== Performance Autology ===
Josefina Báez has also created a system of art, based on her own learning, called "Performance Autology". It has been described as:

"It approaches the creative process from the autobiography of the doer. Technically kept to the core, this path is developed in sobriety. The physical, mental and spiritual realms are researched and nurtured. Sources in this study includes theatre biomechanics, yoga, meditation, calligraphy, world dance, music, literature, theatre, popular culture, tea culture, video arts, social, health and healing sciences, among others."

== Retreats ==
Báez and Ay Ombe organize theatre retreats internationally.

Ay Ombe Retreats have already been held at:

- Christchurch, New Zealand:February 2004;
- Pirque and Miravalle, Chile:February 2005, April 2006, November 2007;
- Bangalore, India:January 2009
- New York State: August 2009.
- Sonido del Yaque Eco-lodge: Jarabacoa, Dominican Republic 2015
- Black Mountain, North Carolina 2013, 2014, 2015, 2016

== Performances ==
Dominicanish premiered in 1999 in New York and Báez has presented it all over the US and internationally. This one-woman performance was directed by Claudio Mir and was accompanied by Ross Huff on the trumpet. Her 2009 performance of Dominicanish marked its 10th anniversary and took place at Harlem Stage, New York from November 6–8, 2009.

The word 'dominicanish' is used to describe her experience because, as a result of her migration, she is not only Dominican. It deals with issues of migration and absorption of new cultures. Even her use of combining English and Spanish is an example of her being in-between two cultures. Báez's use of the code-switching that permeates the play corresponds to her bicultural heritage. By doing so, Báez invites the audience to reflect in a space that interrogates the traditional models of cultural affiliation. Alexandra Gonzanbach, an associate Professor of Spanish at Texas State University, argues that Báez's use of code-switching between English, Spanish, and Spanglish becomes key to analyzing how Hispanic literature can "create spaces of intersection", specifically within immigrant communities. This technique exposes stereotypes, discrimination, and internalized psychological issues of straddling linguistic and cultural spaces. In her own words, "It is in these interstices of language where one can uncouple identity from fixed, discrete categories, and rather consider the multitude of elements at play in the formation of an individual." As she retells her experience of learning English, she moves her mouth and body in unique ways, while her feet remain still. This shows how American society is trying to force her to assimilate into their culture and her resistance to doing so. This resistance is vocalized as Báez states candidly, "I thought that I would never learn English. No way I will not put my mouth like that."

Báez comes back to this statement later in the work explaining how after some time in America, she developed such great English syntax and vocabulary that her teachers were shocked. She mentions that it was through her love of poetry that she was able to develop her English. This love for poetry and Báez's use of blending English with Spanish throughout her poetry act both as a method for her to interpret her transcultural identity and as a mechanism for her to resist assimilation and escape the restrictions that are placed on her identity. Báez draws heavily from her own experiences as an immigrant from the Dominican Republic. Being a Dominican immigrant, Báez possesses multiple identities. In Dominicanish, her identity is defined as always being in motion. She is constantly moving between cultures or physically between two countries. This motion is expressed through her body movement as she is performing. Báez talks about the constant movement that many immigrants feel in their lives in an interview in which she asserts, "So my home, then, is el ni'e. My home is "the neither" that I know, that I have built. If I stayed in the Dominican Republic, I would still be in the ni'e. I was always a migrant, and I think that all migrants have been migrants in their dissenting communities. We wander and create." The play is published slightly different throughout its editions since the state of the Dominican immigrant is not static. In her performance of Dominicanish, she uses examples of daily activities as ways to resist a culture that is trying to erase her colored body. The one-woman play is directed by Claudio Mir and was accompanied by trumpet music by Ross Huff.

The performance, which went under the title "OM is 10" was followed by an academic symposium "Dialogue Dominicanish" organized and co-ordinated by Esther Hernandez (Brown University). Participants included: Conrad James (Birmingham University, UK), Arturo Victoriano (University of Toronto, Canada), Danny Mendez (Michigan State University), Sophie Mariñez (CUNY Graduate Center), Nestor Rodriguez (University of Toronto, Canada), Merle Collins (University of Maryland, USA) and Percy Encinas (Universidad Cientifica del Sur, Peru).

On March 6, 2015, Josefina directed a performance with students from Spanish 126: "Performing Latinidad" to discuss issues of identity and to bring the texts from their class to life. Professor Lorgia H. García Peña, then an Assistant Professor of Romance Languages and Literatures, taught the course at Harvard University.

Many of Báez's performances are easily accessible to the public. In addition to performing on large stages, she also performs in smaller settings such as people's homes, on the street, in parks, and schools. This ultimately allows her performances to reach a wider audience and become more intimate. Her performance of Apartarte/Casarte is often performed in various locations, even in Báez's own home on one occasion. During this performance in front of only 12 people, she interacts with the audience throughout the performance. Apartarte/Casarte is a performance in which Báez combines parts from her other performances to comment on several themes such as her immigrant experience and marriage. There is a part where Báez expresses her happiness of being newly married, which quickly transitions to her frustration of being expected to live up to gendered housewife duties as she angrily performs acts of domesticity. In this performance, she is resisting the treatment of women and traditional gender roles.
