= Sonia Báez-Hernández =

Puerto-Dominican interdisciplinary artist (born 1958)

Sonia Baez-Hernandez (born 1958) is a Puerto-Dominican interdisciplinary artist. She works with a wider variety of media including drawing, painting, instillations, performance art, poetry, and filmmaking. Baez-Hernandez is also a human rights activist, particularly in regard to victims of the American healthcare system.

== Early life ==
Baez-Hernandez was born in Santo Domingo, Dominican Republic on April 26, 1958. At five her family relocated to Puerto Rico after the April Revolution, part of the Dominican Civil War, in 1965. During this era, as many Puerto Ricans were migrating to the United States, Dominicans and other Caribbean nations had an influx in migration to Puerto Rico. Dominicans have a large population within Puerto Rico, which has caused a rivalry and tension between the two Latino countries for decades. With strong ties to both the Dominican Republic and Puerto Rico, Baez-Hernandez identifies herself as a Puerto-Dominican.

== Education ==
Baez-Hernandez received a bachelor's degree from the University of Puerto Rico in political science. She earned a Masters of Fine Arts degree from the School of the Art Institute of Chicago in painting and drawing. She also earned another master's degree in sociology from the University of California, Los Angeles. She taught sociology and art at Broward College in Pembroke Pines, Florida.

== Exhibitions ==
Baez-Hernandez performed "Tram-body" at the Body Modification Conference at Macquarie University in Sydney, Australia, and Collage de las Americas. She has performed at the Diaspora Vibe Gallery in Miami, the School of the Art Institute of Chicago in Chicago, the Polvo Gallery in Chicago, Humboldt Park Stables Gallery in Chicago, Aguijon Theater in Chicago, and the Nuyorican Poets Café in New York. Her art has been on display in a number of places as well. The museums that have displayed her work include the Museum of Science and Industry in Chicago, the Royal College of Art in London, England, the Museum of Modern Art in the Dominican Republic, the School of the Art Institute of Chicago in Chicago, Juchitán Casa de Arte y Cultura and the X Teresa in Mexico the Morlan Gallery in Lexington, Kentucky, the Norton Center for the Arts in Danville Kentucky, Calles y Suenos in Mexico, and the Collage de le Americas in Chicago. ÷

== Writing ==
Baez-Hernandez has also published articles in academic journals and creative writing. She wrote “A Woman’s Cancer Journey: A Call for Human Rights” in Research for Community and Cultural Change in 2011 and “Breast Cancer: a New Aesthetic of the Subject” in The National Women’s Studies Association Journal in December 2009.

She started creative writing as a teenager. Baez-Hernandez first published poem was Born Equal in Centro de Estudios Puertorriquenos, Vol X11, No. 2000. She was selected to published Container, and There is Something in the anthology Between the Heart and the Land/Entre el Corazón y la Tierra Latina Poets from the Midwest (eds.) B. Cárdenas, J. Vázquez Paz. Chicago: Abrazo Press, 2000. books.google. She was invited to publish three poems at the Polvo post. Also publish the poems Azuloso, Intrusions, and Between Salome and Penelope, in the Diálogo, Centro for Latino Research, DePaul University, No. 11, Summer 2008. In addition, Baez Hernandez published an essay the Last Artist Standing: Living and sustaining A Creative Life over 50, edited by Sharon Louden, 2025.

== Territories of the Breast ==
In 2001, Baez-Hernandez was diagnosed with breast cancer. During diagnosed in and out patient clinic her rights to understand and discuss her treatment options had been violated. She began to document her body modification through biopsies, treatment and between surgeries, as strategies to manage the anguish of being disfranchised. She shares the struggles with the American healthcare system, both as a woman and an immigrant, reflected a human rights movement within her artwork. In 2006, she produced a film called Territories of the Breast, which documented not only her experience with her cancer treatment but the treatment of fellow patients as well. The film was given the Spirit award at the Reels Sister of the Diaspora Film Festival in New York.
