= Josefina Stubbs =

Dominican development practitioner (born 1959)

- Born: November 25, 1959 (age 66); Sánchez, Samana, Dominican Republic
- Education: Universidad Autónoma de Santo Domingo
- Occupations: Candidate for President of IFAD; Development Practitioner

Josefina Stubbs (born November 25, 1959) is a development practitioner and was nominated by the Government of the Dominican Republic for President of the International Fund for Agricultural Development (IFAD) in the 2017 elections. Stubbs has dedicated her career to the plight of poor women and men around the world. Between 1984 and 2000, she managed national and regional programs for Oxfam UK, where she strongly advocated for smallholder farmers’ participation in decision-making and project design. Between 2000 and 2008, Stubbs led several initiatives at the World Bank aimed to strengthen the inclusion and participation of rural communities and marginalized groups in development policies and investment programs. In IFAD, where she served from 2008 until 2016 – when her candidacy for President of IFAD was announced – Stubbs focused on fostering dialogue and collaboration within and between countries, improving aid effectiveness and impact measurement, and design IFAD’s strategy for 2016-2025. She has contributed to position IFAD as the world's leader in inclusive rural transformation, and placed smallholder farmers at the center of Agenda 2030 for Sustainable Development.

== Early life and education ==
Stubbs was born in Sanchez, Samana, a small town on the eastern coast of the Dominican Republic and was raised in the capital city, Santo Domingo. She attended the Colegio Santo Domingo and Quisqueya where from the very early years she excelled as a student and as leader. Her mother, Bienvenida Mercedes, a school teacher for more than 40 years, taught generations of Dominican women and men. Her father, an engineer, was educated in the Dominican Republic and in Mexico. Her sisters Paulina and Carolina are in the field of science and engineering, and management.

Stubbs attended the Universidad Autónoma de Santo Domingo, where she earned a B.Sc. in Psychology in 1981 and a M.A in Sociology in 1983. In 1991, she earned a M.Sc. in Political Science and International Development at the Institute of Social Science, in The Hague, Holland.

== Professional career ==
Stubbs started her career in Oxfam in 1984 in her home country. She worked with grassroots organizations and local groups, donor organizations and governments, pioneering a participatory decision-making process that including poor urban and rural communities. Her legacy in the Dominican Republic includes the entrance of small scale producers of coffee, cocoa and banana in the then nascent fair trade market in Europe with companies such as Max Havelaar and in the United States with Starbucks. Between 1997 and 2000, she was appointed Regional Director for the Caribbean, Mexico and Central America, where she continued to empower grassroots organizations to increase and improve their production and enter formal food and commodity markets.

In 1995, in her functions as Director of the Caribbean and Central America region of Oxfam UK she forged the first model of partnership with other Oxfam offices, forming the basis for today’s Oxfam International.

Between 2000 and 2006, she served as Sector Leader at the World Bank in Rural, Environment and Social Development. At the Bank, Stubbs designed and introduced policies and operational procedures in the areas of gender and economic empowerment, integration of people of African descent and indigenous peoples in World Bank operations and community-driven development programs, and led the mainstreaming of inclusive social safeguard policies for rural sector investments. Stubbs also led the design and implementation of the new analytical, financial and policy instruments for the systematic inclusion of women, people of African descent and indigenous peoples in mainstream development programs.

In 2008, Stubbs was appointed Regional Director in the Latin America and the Caribbean Division of the International Fund for Agricultural Development (IFAD), where she continued working to introduce innovations and foster dialogue and cooperation between governments, co-financiers, the private sector and civil society. In 2014, she became IFAD’s Associate Vice-President for the new Strategy and Knowledge, leading the Department to produce IFAD’s Strategy 2016-2025, the Rural Development Report 2016, a new corporate program effectiveness and impacts reporting system, and an innovative results and impact measurement framework for improved aid effectiveness. Under her leadership, IFAD was recognized as the world’s leader in fostering inclusive rural transformation, with smallholder farmers at the center of Agenda 2030 for Sustainable Development.
