= Ramón Isidro Ditrén Díaz =

Dominican writer (1933–2010)

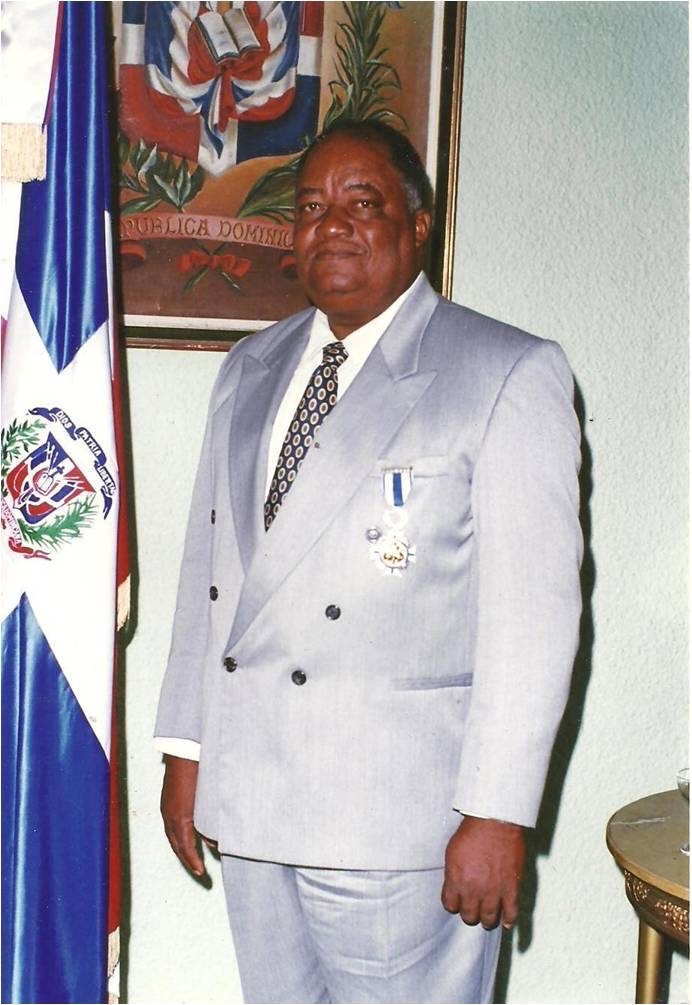
- Ditrén Díaz
- Born: January 2, 1933; Santo Domingo, Dominican Republic
- Died: March 22, 2010 (aged 77); Santo Domingo, Dominican Republic
- Occupations: Poet; essayist; construction worker
- Years active: 1954-2010
- Spouse: Paulina Caridad Flores Gutiérrez (m. 1954; died 2010)
- Children: 10

Ramón Isidro Ditrén Díaz (Spanish: [raˈmon iˈsoðɾo ðiˈtɾen ˈdi.as] (January 2, 1933 – March 22, 2010) was a Dominican construction worker, cooperative member, essayist, poet, and short story writer. He is known for being one of the pioneers of the Dominican Cooperative Movement, the president and founder of the Association of Master Builders, and the executive vice president of the Institute for Cooperative Development and Credit (IDECOOP).
