= Luis Manuel Medina =

Dominican broadcast journalist

- Born: March 31, 1968; Consuelo, San Pedro de Macorís Province, Dominican Republic
- Died: February 14, 2017 (age 49); San Pedro de Macorís, San Pedro de Macorís Province, Dominican Republic
- Cause of death: Fatal gunshot wound
- Body discovered: 103.5 FM Radio San Pedro de Macoris
- Resting place: Consuelo, San Pedro de Macorís Province, Dominican Republic; 18.5593° N by 69.2967° W
- Education: Universidad Central del Este
- Occupations: Broadcast journalist, host and sports announcer
- Years active: 25 years
- Employer(s): 103.5 FM HICC, as well as Estrellas Orientales
- Known for: "Milenio Caliente" radio program and as the voice of the Estrellas Orientales baseball team

Luis Manuel Medina (March 31, 1968 – February 14, 2017) was a Dominican broadcast journalist and host for the FM radio station 103.5 HICC in San Pedro de Macorís, Dominican Republic. He was fatally shot along with his producer during a Facebook live-streaming video.

== Personal life ==
Luis Manuel Medina was a native of the Dominican Republic, born on March 31, 1968. Medina was raised in Consuelo, San Pedro de Macorís Province. He graduated from the communications program at Universidad Central del Este, a private university in his home province. He is buried in Consuelo, San Pedro de Macorís Province.

== Career ==
Medina was a broadcast journalist for twenty-five years. He was employed by 103.5 HICC, an FM radio station located in San Pedro de Macorís Province. At 103.5 FM, Medina co-hosted a popular morning radio program titled Milenio Caliente (Hot Millennium in English), where he often gave live news updates. He also hosted other radio shows for 103.5 FM. Before he worked for 103.5, Medina was employed by Radio Dial and worked on the news program Reportero 670. Medina was also widely known as the voice of the Dominican professional baseball team, Estrellas Orientales.

== Death ==
Luis Manuel Medina was fatally shot in his home town, Consuelo, San Pedro de Macorís Province.

Luis Manuel Medina was fatally shot on February 14, 2017, during a Facebook live-streaming broadcast in the Centro Comercial del Este area. The attacker first opened fire on Medina's co-producer, Leonidas Martínez, in the station while Medina was reading the news for a live news update for Milenio Caliente. Gunshots could be heard in the background along with a female voice yelling "Shots! Shots! Shots!" The attacker then entered the recording studio and shot and killed Medina. Both Medina and Martínez were killed during the attack. A station secretary, Dayana García de Fernandez, was injured in the stomach and required surgery at the Centro Médico Macoríx, a hospital. The attacker was later identified as José Rodríguez, a 59-year-old man who had a grievance with the pair over either land or as a result of their media work, such as a report from a week earlier about polluted lands.

== Context ==
The murder of journalists in the Dominican Republic is rare. In Medina's case, there was no immediate motive, although Medina had criticized a political movement in San Pedro de Macorís Province.

Journalists killed on air or in front of a camera have become more common since 2015. In the United States, journalist Alison Parker and camera operator Adam Ward were killed on air on August 26, 2015. The Committee to Protect Journalists has highlighted the danger to journalists.

== Reactions ==
I condemn the murder of Luis Manuel Medina and Leónidas Martínez. Such brutality spreads terror not only throughout the media community of the country concerned but through society at large. I urge the authorities to do all they can to bring those responsible for this crime to trial and support the media whose contribution to the informed public debate is indispensable to maintain respect for internationally recognized human rights, notably the basic right of freedom of expression.

— Irina Bokova, director-general of UNESCO

We deeply regret today's events with the death of these communicators, a condemnable and painful act that has appalled the Dominican society. The investigations are underway and we will seek with all the tools at our disposal to find the truth.

— Jean Rodriguez, Attorney General

== See also ==
- Telecommunications in the Dominican Republic
