= Felipe Mañón (activist) =

19th-century Dominican activist

Felipe Mañón (1848–1938) was a Dominican revolutionary who participated in the events of the Dominican Restoration War at a young age. After the war, he held an active political career during the periods of the Second Dominican Republic.

== Early life ==
He was born in the capital city of Santo Domingo. His parents were Dominicans of African descent; his father, Silverio Mañón, was a captain of the Liberation Army of the First Dominican Republic.

== Restoration War ==
In 1861, President Pedro Santana, a leading military commander of the Dominican War of Independence, struck a deal with the Kingdom of Spain to revert the Dominican Republic into colonial status. By March of that same year, the colony was reestablished, and Spanish troops poured into the colony to carry out the occupation.(This included troops from nearby Cuba and Puerto Rico, the two remaining strongholds of Spain in the Caribbean).

In August 1863, the Dominican Restoration War erupted on the island. Mañon, then just 15 years old, set out for the Dominican jungle to join the insurgency ranks. He left for the city of Santiago, where he received orders to placed under the command of General Marcos Evangelista Adón in the rebel town La Victoria. Under his leadership, he carried out the entire campaign.

== Second Dominican Republic ==
After the war, he followed the political orientation of almost all the non-Cibáeño restorers: he was a Baecista with all the fanatic ardour distinctive of the faction. For it he fought in more than twenty actions, suffered persecutions and was exiled.

During the last Báez administration, while he was a Colonel, President Baez appointed him Commander of Arms of Bayaguana. He was soon promoted to Brigadier General, but when the regime fell in 1878, he left the country. Upon his return in 1879, he refrain from partaking in politics, perhaps due to the fact that he did not see the possibility of Baez returning to the Presidency. Therefore, on the occasion of the revolution that began in Puerto Plata on October 6, 1879, against President Cesáreo Guillermo, when he was called to take up arms in defense of the Government, he presented as an excuse for not serving that he did not want to participate in the struggle of the liberals, which in his opinion were the blues, then in dissent. For his part, he was preferred to continue his trade as shoemaker, which provided a satisfactory means of living.

That same year, Ulises Heureaux triumphantly entered the capital. As soon as he learned of Felipe Mañón's attitude, he wanted to be his friend and have him at his side. He was already beginning to be an actor on the stage of Santo Domingo, and he needed to surround himself with loyal men. He had a close relationship with Mañón, but only achieved his conditional friendship, since while Buenaventura Báez lived, it was not possible to win him that supporter. Time passed; Báez had died, and Heureaux occupied the First Magistracy for the second time. Since the events of the revolution of 1886, Mañón had already been involved in political activities, presiding as Division General of the War Council of the Capital, appointed by President Alejandro Woss y Gil.

One day, when Mañón was out on an errand, he received a request to meet with President Heureaux at the presidential mansion. Mañón reluctantly abandoned his tasks and presented himself to the person who requested it. From there, the two went to the palace by car. Mañon was led by the arm to the Ministers, gathered in Council, and upon his arrival, he was surprised to be immediately named Commander of the Port of Santo Domingo. At first, Mañón was hesitant to accept this position, citing that it was due to "lack of languages;" Heureaux would eventually convince him otherwise.

While serving in his position, Mañón proved his capabilities that earned him the applause of his superiors, especially Heureaux. He fulfilled his duty without ceasing to avoid evil when it was in his power to do so. The esteem that Heureaux had for him, expressed in acts, satisfied with his rectitude, loyalty and discretion, planted in his heart a degree of affection that he had not felt in dealing with men; to the point of making it his personal duty of wanting to be a guardian of Heureaux's life. For this, he went to reside opposite the presidential mansion.

However, in July 1899, Heureaux was assassinated in Moca. Mañón, perhaps as a sign of gratitude and loyalty to his fallen friend, would attend his funeral to pay his respect. (Every anniversary following Heureeax's death, Mañón would continue to his grave).

== Death ==
In the following decades, despite his struggling with alcoholism, which he eventually overcame, He lived the rest of his days relatively peaceful. He managed to survive off of his income as a tradesman, although he frequently lenses money to those in need. He continued this life until dying at the old age of 90 in 1938.

== See also ==
- Dominican Restoration War
- Marcos Evangelista Adón
- Ulises Heureaux
