= Elibeidy Dani =

Dominican fashion model

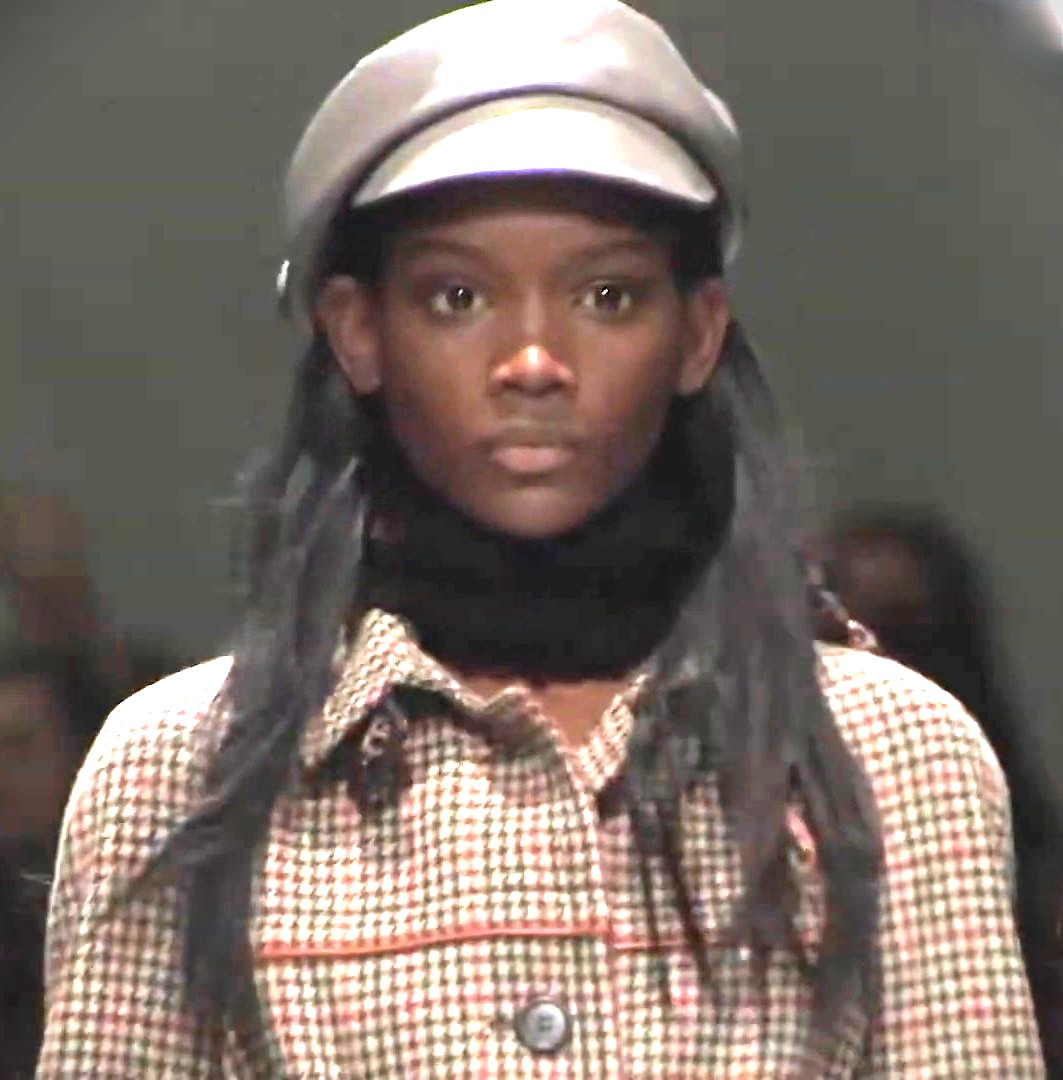
- Dani at the Prada Fall/Winter 2017 Men's & Women's Runway Show in Milan, Italy
- Born: Elibeidy Dani Martinez; May 6, 1997 (age 29); Vallejuelo, Dominican Republic
- Occupation: Fashion model
- Modeling information
- Height: 5 ft 9 in (175 cm)
- Hair color: Black
- Eye color: Black
- Agency: IMG Models (Worldwide); Louisa Models (Munich)

Elibeidy Dani Martinez (also spelled Elibeidy Danis Martinez, (Note: Many reliable sources have spelled it Danis but it is currently unknown if that is the correct spelling of her name, as she spells it Dani.) born May 6, 1997) is a Dominican fashion model. She notably starred in Gucci’s all-black model “Soul Scene” campaign.

== Career ==
Dani debuted as a Burberry exclusive, closing their F/W 2016 show. She has walked for Louis Vuitton, Calvin Klein, Acne Studios, Missoni, Paco Rabanne, Saint Laurent, Brandon Maxwell, Gucci, Sonia Rykiel, Valentino, Missoni, Jil Sander, and Prada.

She has appeared in American Vogue, Vogue Italia, Vogue Japan, and T: The New York Times Style Magazine. Dani has appeared in advertisements for stores including Mango and Zara.

In 2017, Dani was chosen as a “Top Newcomer” by models.com.
