= Luz del Alba Jiménez =

Dominican politician

Minister for Youth of the Dominican Republic
- In office December 9, 2020 – December 5, 2021

Deputy Minister of Technical and Planning in the Ministry of Youth and Sports
- In office August 16, 2020 – December 9, 2020

Personal details
- Born: February 16, 1992 (age 34) Santo Domingo
- Party: Modern Revolutionary Party

Luz del Alba Jiménez (born February 16, 1992, in Santo Domingo) is a Dominican politician. She was the Minister for Youth of the Dominican Republic. Jiménez was appointed Minister of Youth by President Luis Abinader on December 9, 2020 and was in office till December 5, 2021. She previously served as the Deputy Minister of Planning and Development for the Ministry of Youth. She is the third woman to be appointed Minister of Youth.

She is a member of the Modern Revolutionary Party.

== Scandal ==
On November 8, 2021, Luz del Alba Jiménez was accused of orchestrating acts of corruption by wanting to benefit from two companies called Gretmon and SketchProm worth 3 million pesos. In March 2021, a special report revealed that Jimenez's parents, siblings and other relatives were on the payroll of the Community Higher Technical Institute (ITSC).
