= Julito Fulcar =

Dominican senator and professor (born 1966)

- Born: July 19, 1966 (age 60)
- Education: Universidad Santander de México
- Occupations: Professor, Senator
- Political party: Dominican Revolutionary Party
- Spouse: Deyanira Aybar
- Children: 3

Jultio Fulcar Encarnacion (born 19 July 1966) is a senator and professor of the Dominican Republic for the province of Peravia.

== Political career ==
Fulcar is part of the Dominican Revolutionary Party. He was elected in 2024 with 52.81% of the votes.
