= Haitian emigration =

19th-century African American migration movement

Haitian emigration (French: Émigration Haïtienne; Haitian Creole: Emigrasyon Ayisyen) was a term for the emigration of free blacks from the United States to settle in Haiti in the early 19th century, especially in the years 1824–1826.

In an attempt to break out from the United States' racist society, antebellum free blacks migrated to Haiti. Although a few emigrants left for Haiti during the 1810s, it was not until 1824 that, with the support of the Haitian President Jean-Pierre Boyer, the emigration began in earnest. The Haitian emigration project ran against the wishes of the American Colonization Society, which attempted to remove free blacks as far as Africa and dreaded the idea of strengthening the black state of Haiti. Several thousand blacks departed towards Haiti in the summer of 1824 and the flow continued until 1826 when the Haitian government stopped paying and defraying the transportation costs. U.S. blacks continued moving to Haiti after this, but the numbers were never as high as those that left between the years of 1824–1826.

Another Haitian emigration scheme began in 1859 after Fabre Geffrard overthrew the despotic regime of Emperor Faustin I. Even though this project had the support of Abraham Lincoln and other political figures, the frustrations of the 1820s and an increasing black identification with the U.S. substantially hindered the enthusiasm this time.

== See also ==
- Samaná Americans
- Americans in Haiti
- Haiti–United States relations
- Haitian Americans
- Canadians in Haiti
- American fugitives in Cuba

== Sources ==
- Dean, David McEwen. Defender of the Race: James Theodore Holly, Black Nationalist Bishop (Boston: Lambeth Press, 1979).
- Dixon, Chris. African America and Haiti: Emigration and Black Nationalism in the Nineteenth Century (Westport, Connecticut, & London: Greenwood Press, 2000).
- Miller, Floyd J. The Search for a Black Nationality: Black Emigration and Colonization, 1787-1863 (Urbana: University of Illinois Press, 1975).
