= Eutimio Mambí =

19th-century black guerilla fighter from the Dominican Republic

Juan Ethnnius Mamby was a black officer of the Spanish Army who arrived in the Dominican Republic at some point in 1810s. In the 1840s, however, he deserted the Spanish and enlisted in the Dominican Army to fight in the Dominican War of Independence and the Dominican Restoration War. According to Elmore Leonard, he is said to have been the origin of the word, Mambises, which is used to refer to independence fighters from the Dominican Republic and Cuba. (Note: Elmore Leonard, in his adventure novel Cuba Libre, implies that the word has its roots in the surname of Eutimio Mambí, a leader who fought against the Spanish in Santo Domingo. He adds that Spanish soldiers, noting the similar machete tactics of the Cuban revolutionaries, began referring to them as "Mambí's men," which was later shortened in usage to "mambís" or "mambises.")

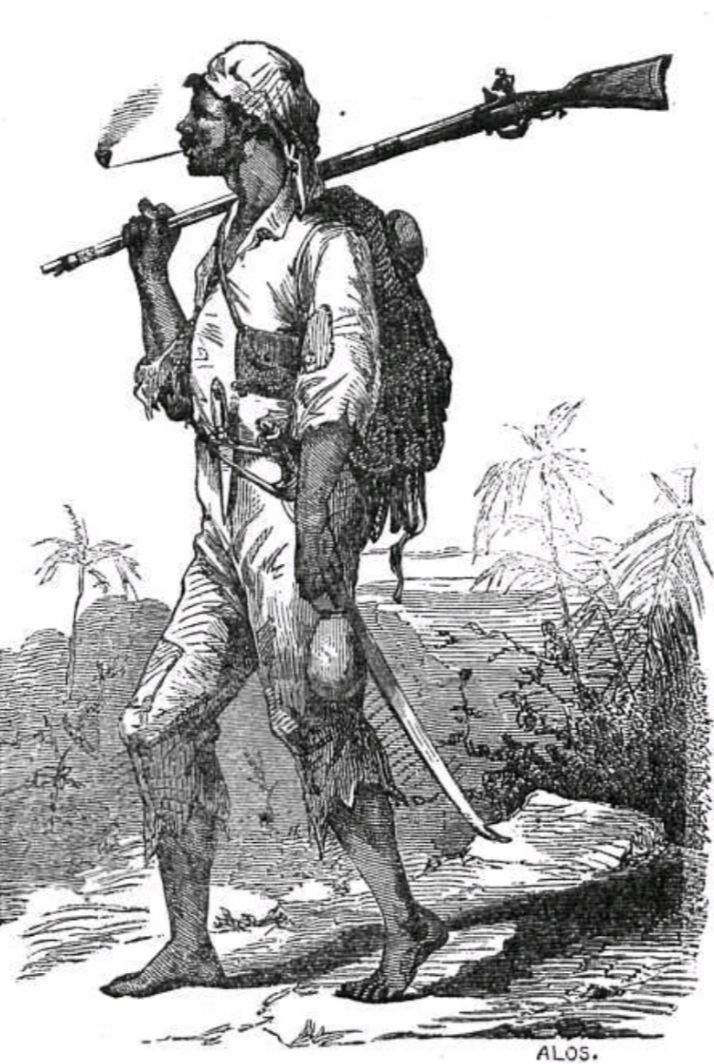
Illustration of a black insurgent, possibly a Mambí, in Puerto Plata, Dominican Republic.

== See also ==
- Dominican Restoration War
- Ten Years' War
- Mambises
