= Caesar Nero Paul =

American patriarch

Caesar Nero Paul (c. 1741 – 1823) was the patriarch of a prominent New England family of writers, clergymen, and abolitionists. A victim of the Atlantic slave trade as a young child, he became a free man after the French and Indian War; married a white woman and founded a family in Exeter, New Hampshire; and lived to see his children attain important positions in the free Black community of the early United States.

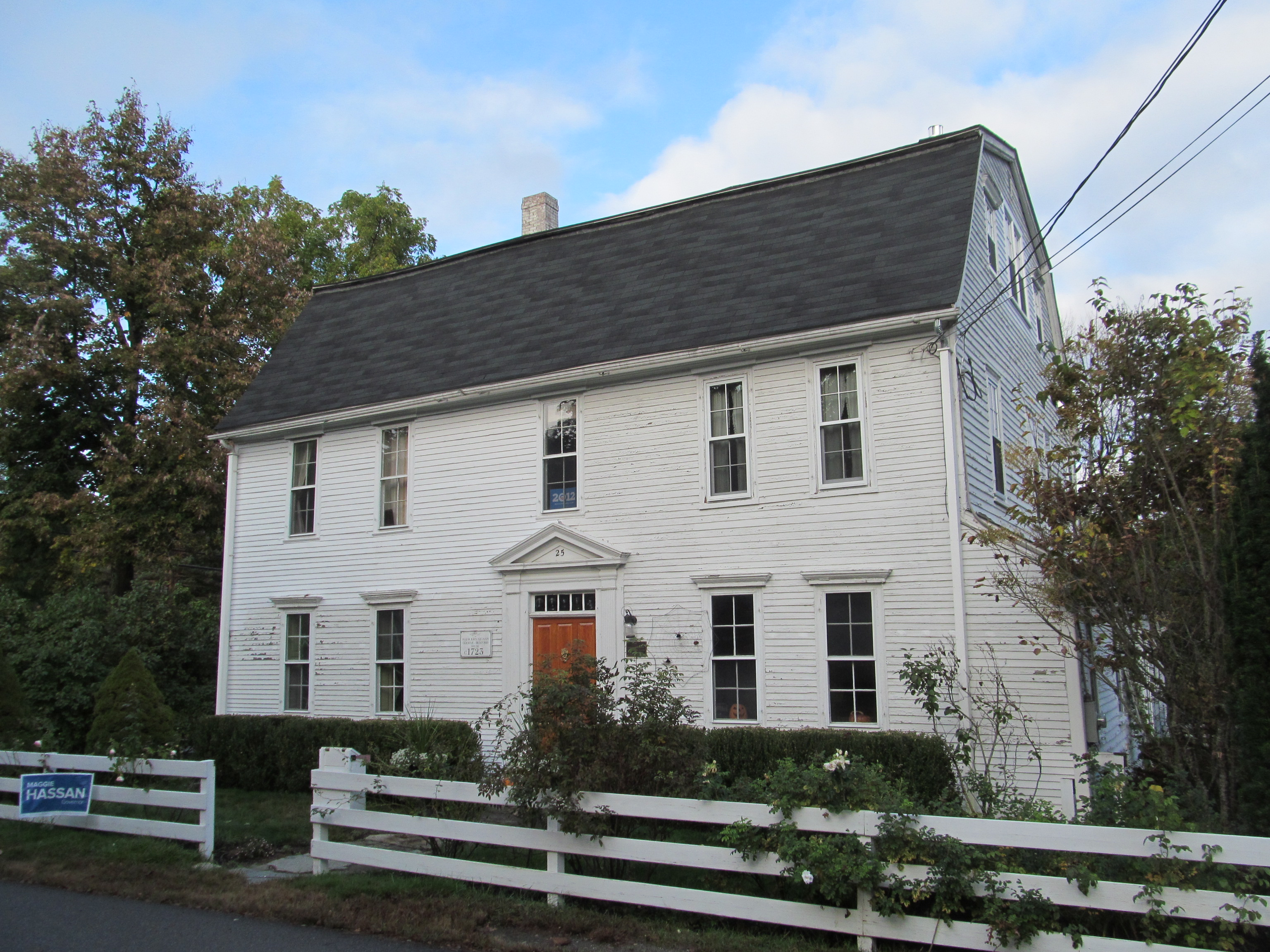
The house in Exeter, New Hampshire, in which Caesar Nero Paul was enslaved as a boy.

== Life ==
Caesar Nero Paul was born around 1741 at an unknown location in Africa. He was kidnapped as part of the Atlantic slave trade and brought to Exeter, in the British Province of New Hampshire. There he was held enslaved by Major John Gilman and called "Caesar Nero" following the Colonial fashion for giving slaves Classical names. His enslaver, scion of the locally powerful Gilman family, was called to fight in the French and Indian Wars, taking the fourteen year old Caesar Nero along with him. Later freed, Caesar Nero chose the family name Paul for himself and married Lovey Rollins, a white woman and daughter of a lawyer from nearby Stratham. (New Hampshire was one of the few American states never to formally outlaw interracial marriage). Together they had at least six children, the most famous of whom was Thomas Paul, founder of the First African Baptist Church in Boston. In their later years, Caesar and Lovey Paul moved to join Thomas in Boston, where they lived the rest of their life.

Caesar Nero stood at the head of at least two generations of abolitionists, with many of his children and grandchildren attaining prominence. Along with Thomas, three other sons became Baptist ministers: Nathaniel Paul in Albany, Benjamin Paul in New York, and Shadrack Paul in Epping, New Hampshire. His daughter Rhoda stayed in Exeter to marry the revolutionary soldier Jude Hall. Accomplished among his grandchildren were the abolitionist Susan Paul, the poet James Monroe Whitfield, and Thomas Paul Jr., one of the first Black graduates of Dartmouth College. Three other grandchildren, the sons of Rhoda Hall, were kidnapped into Southern slavery, never to see their family again.

== Legacy ==
The novelist Pauline Hopkins could trace her lineage to Caesar Nero Paul, great-great-grandfather on her mother's side. She celebrated the Paul brothers in speeches and writings and brought attention to the role Black Americans played in the founding of the country.
