= Maj. John Gilman House =

Historic house in New Hampshire, United States

- U.S. National Register of Historic Places
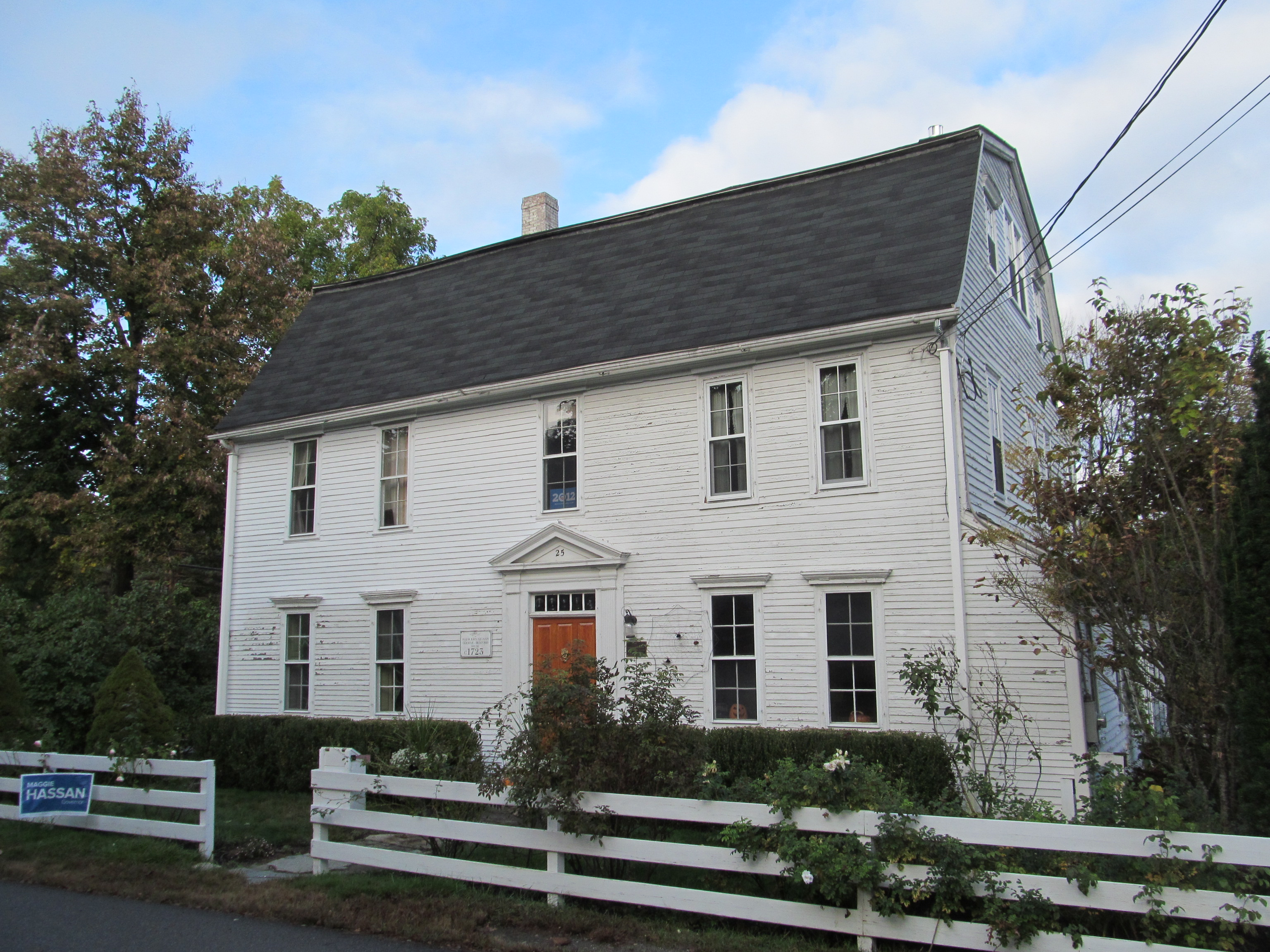

- Location within New Hampshire Location within the United States
- Location: 25 Cass St., Exeter, New Hampshire
- Coordinates: 42°59′3″N 70°57′16″W
- Area: 1.2 acres (0.49 ha)
- Built: 1738
- Architectural style: Georgian
- NRHP reference No.: 88000659
- Added to NRHP: June 14, 1988

The Maj. John Gilman House is a historic house at 25 Cass Street in Exeter, New Hampshire, United States. Built in 1738, it is a well-preserved example of a Georgian gambrel-roof house, further notable for its association with the locally prominent Gilman family. It was listed on the National Register of Historic Places in 1988.

== Description and history ==
The John Gilman House is located north of Exeter's commercial and civic downtown area, at the southeast corner of Cass and Park streets. It is a 2 1/2-story wood-frame structure, with a gambrel roof and clapboarded exterior. Its main facade is five bays wide, with a central entrance flanked by pilasters and topped by a transom and gabled pediment. Windows are topped by shallow projecting cornices on the ground floor, and butt against the eave on the second floor. The windows themselves appear to be c. 1830 Greek Revival replacements, and are narrower and taller than typical Georgian windows. The interior was subjected to a careful restoration of its 18th-century character in the 1960s.

The house was built in 1738 by Colonel John Gilman for his son, also named John. The elder Gilman lived in the nearby Gilman Garrison House, in which his son was born. It is one of only three gambrel-roofed houses to survive in the town from the Georgian period, and it is the least-altered of those. The Gilmans, both father and son, were prominent in the local militia and town affairs. Later residents included Thomas Odiorne, son-in-law of the younger Gilman, who was a successful merchant and manufacturer of equipment and parts for sailing ships.

Major John Gilman held an enslaved African boy of fourteen years old, Caesar Nero Paul, in this house as a house-boy. Caesar later accompanied him to the French and Indian Wars, was captured, then returned to Exeter in 1771 and lived as a free man. Caesar married Lovey Rollins and was the father of noted Baptist minister Rev. Thomas Paul and two other ministers. His daughter Rhoda married noted black Revolutionary soldier Jude Hall, and another daughter, Nancy, was the mother of black abolitionist poet James Monroe Whitfield.

== See also ==
- National Register of Historic Places listings in Rockingham County, New Hampshire
