= Thomas Paul (Baptist minister) =

American baptist minister (1773–1831)

Reverend Thomas Paul
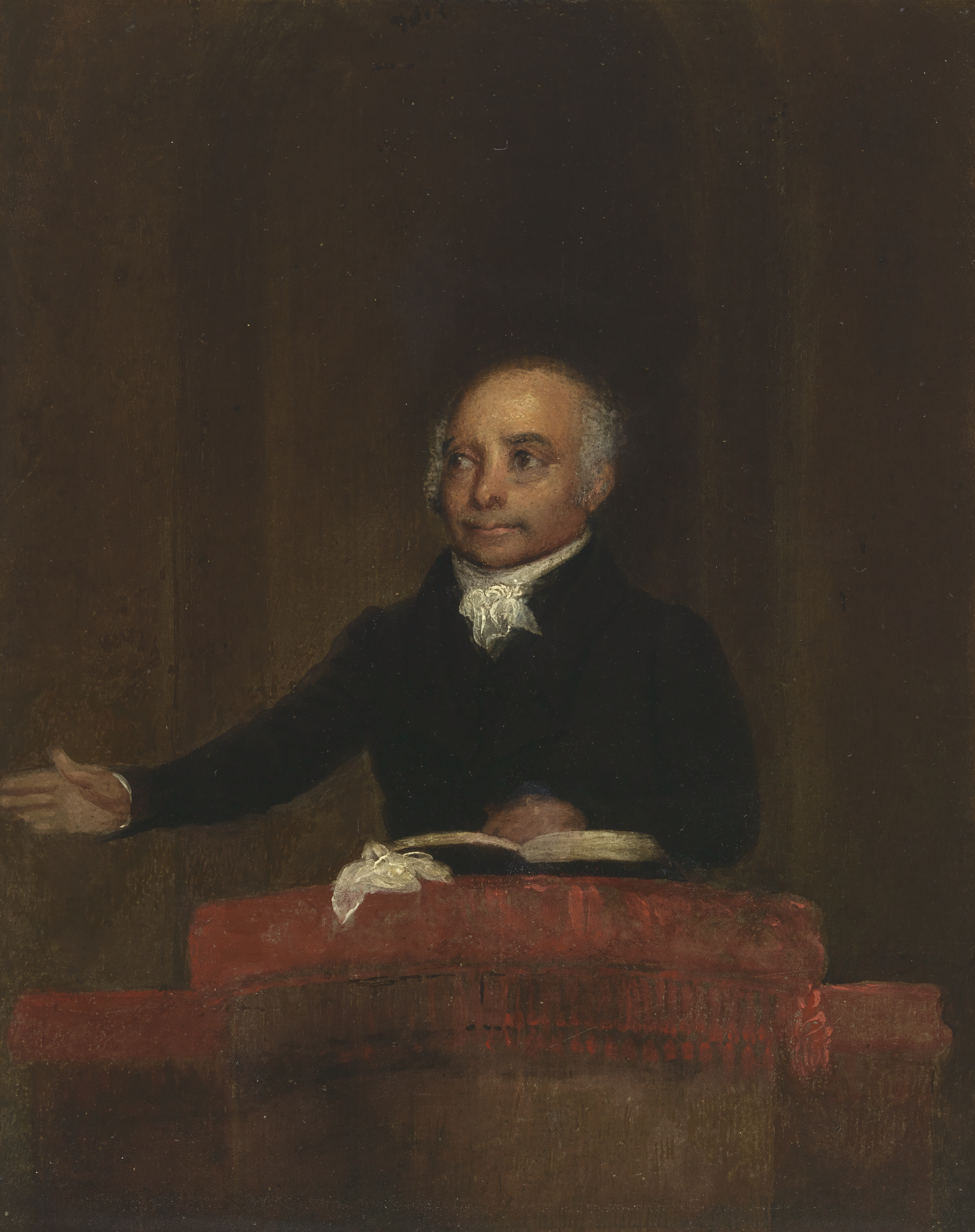
- Portrait of Thomas Paul, by Thomas Badger, ca.1825
- Born: Thomas Paul; 3 September 1773; Rockingham, Province of New Hampshire
- Died: 13 April 1831 (aged 57); Boston, Massachusetts, United States
- Education: Free Will Baptist church
- Occupation: Pastor
- Spouse: Catherine Waterhouse
- Children: Ann Catherine Paul Susan Paul (1809) Thomas Paul Jr.

Thomas Paul (1773–1831) was a Baptist minister. In 1805, he became the first pastor for the First African Baptist Church, currently known as the African Meeting House in Boston, Massachusetts. He later helped found the Abyssinian Baptist Church in New York City. An abolitionist, he was a leader in the black community and was an active missionary in Haiti.

== Early life and career ==
Paul was born in the town of Exeter in Rockingham County, New Hampshire on September 3, 1773, the son of a freed slave named Caesar Nero Paul. He was educated at the Free Will Society Academy with two of his brothers. He then pursued higher-education for the ministry in Hollis, New Hampshire, at the Free Will Baptist Church. Paul was baptized by Reverend S.F. Locke and ordained in West Nottingham Meetinghouse by Reverend Thomas Baldwin in 1804. He married Catherine Waterhouse from Cambridge, Massachusetts on December 5, 1805. Shortly after their marriage, they had three children and moved to Boston in 26 George Street.

== First African Baptist Church ==
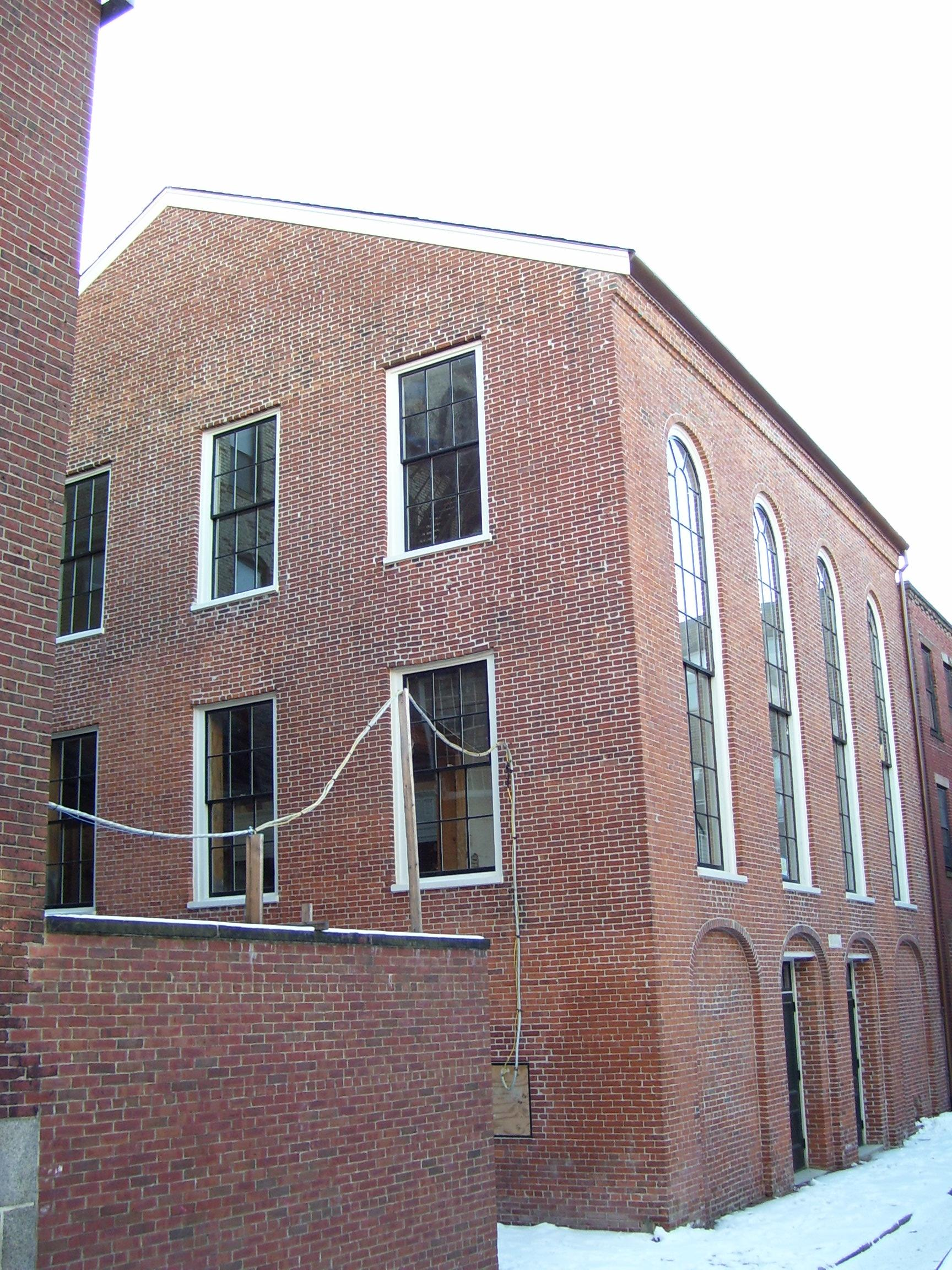
African Meeting House, also known as the First African Baptist Church, founded by Thomas Paul and his congregation.

After moving to Boston, Paul and his family became members of the First Baptist Church. However, following various conflicts with the white members of the church, such as mistreatment of black members, and placing them in the worst seating sections hidden from the minister, Paul and fellow black members created their own body of the church: the First African Baptist Church. Old-Time New England correspondent J. Marcus Mitchell wrote regarding this conflict, "The black members were not being given an equal role in church activities."

Paul met on August 8, 1805 with twenty other black congregational members in Faneuil Hall to discuss how to organize the new of the body church. The church was built with the help of Cato Gardner and the congregation. Shortly after its construction, on December 4, 1806, he became the first pastor for the First African Baptist Church. Paul oversaw the church become a charter member of the Boston Baptist Association, and baptized over a hundred people in his time as pastor. From 1818 to 1828, the attendance of the church grew from 100 to 139. The lack of increase in attendants to the First African Baptist Church is argued to be due to Thomas Paul's abolitionist views at the time.

After its foundation, the church went under various names: Independence Baptist Church, Belknap or Joy Street Baptist Church, and "The Abolition Church" following the founding of the New England Anti-Slavery Society in the church by William Lloyd Garrison on January 6, 1832.

== Abyssinian Baptist Church ==
After the foundation of the First African Baptist Church in 1805, Paul also helped establish black baptist churches all across America. He traveled to New York in 1808 to help a movement of fellow black members of the First Baptist Church in creating another independent black Baptist church. He attended many congregations and preached to large groups regarding the possibility of founding this new independent church. In 1808, the Abyssinian Baptist Church in New York was founded. His brother, Benjamin Paul, was also involved in the founding and later became a minister for the Abyssinian Baptist Church.

== Educational and missionary involvement ==
In 1815, Paul travelled with Prince Saunders to England on a delegation to educate young children from the Massachusetts Baptist Society, meeting William Wilberforce and Thomas Clarkson. A topic raised was black emigration to Haiti. With the support of the white Massachusetts Baptist Society, in May 1817, Paul left for Cap-Haïtien, Haiti as a missionary. He discovered other Christian Protestants, but speaking no French, he made little impact on the Catholic population there. He forged relationships with the Haitian President, Jean-Pierre Boyer and his Secretary General, Joseph Balthazar Inginac. In December 1817, he returned to Boston giving a favorable report of his work in Haiti. Haitian President Jean-Pierre Boyer asked Paul encourage the emigration of black Americans to Haiti. Paul returned to Haiti in July 1824 with black families from Boston, but ultimately failed as many of them could not adjust. After this experience, Thomas Paul became a strong opposer of colonization.

Paul was affiliated with the Education Society for the People of Colour. Together with other black leaders, he contributed to the development of black Liberation Theology by tying biblical teachings to social justice and the quest for African American equal acceptance in society. He also played a key role in Boston black community as member of the African Grand Lodge no. 459 which later became known as Prince Hall Mason. Paul was opposed to integrated education as he believed that black children would receive better education from classrooms taught by black instructors with other black children.

He earned a reputation of being an eloquent speaker, well-organized and educated. After attending one of his sermons, Boston resident William Bentley wrote "[Thomas Paul] impressed the audience with a regard to his sincerity and many with a sense of his talents."

== Final years ==
Paul served the African Baptist Church from 1805 to 1829. He died two years later on April 13, 1831 in Boston, Massachusetts from tuberculosis. Following his death, Garrison wrote an obituary on The Liberator:

... few men ever deserved a higher eulogy than Mr. Paul. In his manners, he was dignified, urbane and attractive;—his colloquial powers were exuberant and vigorous;—his intellect was assiduously cultivated .... As a self-made man (and, in the present age, every colored man, if made at all, must be self-made,) he was indeed a prodigy. His fame, as a preacher, is exceedingly prevalent; for his eloquence charmed the ear, and his piety commended itself to his hearers.

He also received various other mentions, such as by the dean of America's black historians Carter Woodson, who wrote "He frequently made preaching excursions into different parts of the country where his 'color' excited considerable curiosity, and being a person of very pleasing and fervid address, he attracted crowds to hear him."

== Family and relatives ==
Paul was born in Exeter, New Hampshire, the eldest of six brothers in what was to become a prominent family of early Black Americans. He married Catherine Waterhouse on December 5, 1805, and they had three children shortly after: Ann Catherine, Susan, and Thomas, Jr. Susan Paul became a prominent writer and published the first biography of an African American in the United States. Thomas, Jr. worked as a teacher at the Abiel Smith School after studying at the short-lived Noyes Institute. He was one of the first Black graduates of Dartmouth College, having been rejected from Brown on account of his race.

Two of his brothers, Nathaniel Paul and Benjamin Paul, became Baptist preachers and proponents of black emigration to the Wilberforce Colony in Ontario. Nathaniel was a minister at Albany, NY, and founder of the Providence's United African Society in the 1820s. Benjamin was minister of the Abyssinian Baptist Church in New York along with Paul. Paul was the uncle of poet James Monroe Whitfield through his sister Nancy. By his sister Rhoda, he was the brother-in-law of noted black American Revolutionary War soldier, Jude Hall.
