= Hérard Dumesle =

Haitian politician and poet (1784–1858)

Hérard Dumesle (16 June 1784 – 22 June 1858) was a Haitian poet and politician.

== Politics ==
Dumesle, a mulatto, opposed the government of Jean-Pierre Boyer and formed a group of like-minded young mulattoes called the Society for the Rights of Man and of the Citizen. Dumesle's cousin, Charles Rivière-Hérard, led the Revolution of 1843 which forced President Boyer to flee the country. Rivière-Hérard then succeeded Boyer as President of Haiti. Dumesle served as president of the Constituent Assembly and later as a Minister during his cousin's rule. After an 1844 coup d'état, both Dumesle and Rivière-Hérard were forced into exile. They settled in Jamaica and remained there for the rest of their lives.

== Works ==
As a poet, Dumesle's most remembered work is the historical Macanda. He is also known for composing a poem in honor of Jonathas Granville, the director of the Lycee of Port-au-Prince: "Dithyrambe élégiaque sur la mort de Jonathas Granville."
