= Jonathas Granville =

Haitian educator, legal expert, soldier, and diplomat

Citizen Pierre Joseph Marie Granville
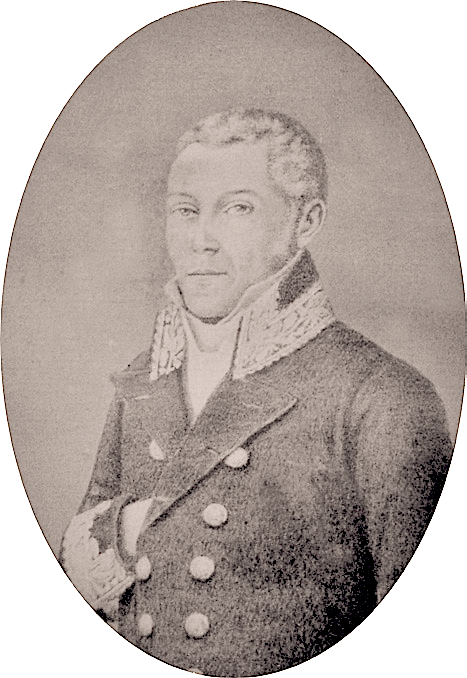
- Jonathas Granville in a portrait taken from his son's biography
- Born: Pierre Joseph Marie Granville; December 5, 1785; Sainte-Anne, a borough of Port-de-Paix, Saint-Domingue
- Died: 1839 (aged 53–54); Cap-Haïtien
- Cause of death: Assassination
- Occupations: Junior Officer, Napoleonic France, 1809 (?) -1814; Diplomat, 1824; Director of Lycee, 1825-1833
- Known for: Promoting the U.S. Black Emigration to Haiti in 1824 and directing the Lycee National de Port-au-Prince
- Title: Citizen
- Movement: Liberal
- Spouse: Louise Sarasin
- Children: Henri Theodore Granville and Anne Victoire Jonathine
- Awards: La croix pour sa belle conduite

Pierre Joseph Marie Granville, known as Jonathas Granville (1785–1839) was a Haitian educator, legal expert, soldier and a diplomat. He was born a free mulatto in Saint-Domingue. He was a musician and poet, skilled swordsman, an experienced diplomat, and civil servant. From about 1806 to 1815, Granville served under Napoleon as a junior officer during the emperor's campaigns in Germany, France, and Austria. After the Bourbon Restoration, he returned to Haiti with his mother and sisters where he quickly entered in the service of Alexandre Pétion's government. In 1824 he visited the United States, to promote the emigration of free Blacks to Haiti. At his return, in 1825, he established a private school, which will become known as the Granville Institute, before being asked to lead the National Lycee in Port-au-Prince. He is considered to be the intellectual father of the 1843 Revolution that finally dislodged Jean-Pierre Boyer's authoritarian regime. Granville was regarded as well-educated and refined, a man of knowledge and virtue. He made popular in the U.S. the Persian saying, "I write insults on sand and favours on marble."

== Early life ==
Granville's parents were Marie-Thérèse-Anne Labrosse and Simon Peter Granville. He was born in Sainte-Anne, a borough of Port-de-Paix, on December 5, 1785. His father was a French tutor to Toussaint Louverture's sons and his mother was a mulâtresse native of Jean-Rabel.

== Education and military experience in France ==
According to the sketchy biography his son wrote about him, Granville went to France as a teenager at the time when the French Revolution was moving toward a more conservative strike, but Napoleon was not yet emperor. His son wrote, "It was in 1799 at the beginning of the deplorable division of the Governor General Toussaint Louverture and Rigaud, that by order of the Executive Board, he was sent to France with other young people for their education. He'll barely thirteen and a half." Louis Joseph Janvier wrote that Granville was one of the first young men from Saint-Domingue that Sonthonax sent to Europe for Education.

On February 20, 1806, after completing his studies at the National Institute des Colonies (former Collège de la Marche) and trying out medicine for a while, Granville enlisted in the Napoleonic army. Janvier wrote that he was one of the survivors of the Battle of Leipzig and that he received the "La Croix pour sa belle conduite" (Cross for his gallant conduct). Granville, while in the U.S. referred to his years in France when he, with dignity, led whites, in their own country, into battle.

== Family ==
Returning to Haiti, Jonathas Granville married Louise Sarasin, a cousin of President Boyer, on November 24, 1817, in Port-au-Prince Haiti. He had two children: Anne Victoire Jonathine (1818) and Henri Theodore Granville (1825). His son Henri would later publish works about his father and his work in Haiti. Henri included in the volume letters written between Boyer and his father as well as personal notes of Granville.

== Immigration plans ==
When Haitian President Jean-Pierre Boyer, in collaboration with Joseph Balthazar Inginac extended an invitation for U.S. Blacks to settle on Hispaniola, Granville serving as his emissary played a major role in Boyer's plans. Haitians leaders believed free blacks should migrate to Haiti instead of Liberia, where the American Colonization Society (ACS) promoted as the preeminent location for emigrants.

With tension growing between the ACS and Boyer, Boyer used Granville to seal his plans for the free Blacks of the United States.

== Work in the United States ==
In May 1824, Granville was sent to Philadelphia in an attempt to encourage freed blacks to migrate to Haiti. Along with fifty thousand pounds of coffee, Boyer provided Granville with a fund to pay in full the emigrants passage to Haiti.

Granville's appeals to blacks began in Philadelphia and soon spread to New York and Boston. His message highlighted the benefits that Haiti provided, and eventually spread to Baltimore and Indiana.

With the backing of the Haitian government, Granville and his companions, Prince Saunders and Loring D. Dewey, guaranteed the emigrants economic prosperity in Haiti. They were also promised free passage, provisions for several months and 3 acres (12,000 m^{2}) of land a piece. Other incentives included higher wages for artisans, a guaranteed six to twelve Haitian dollars per week and forty dollars per family for simply taking the voyage to Haiti.

Granville along with his colleagues preached in churches, fraternal halls, and amongst mutual aid societies. This created excitement for many Black Americans and soon spread to many important figures and leaders in the Black community.

Granville won over many influential people such as Nicholas Biddle, president of the Second Bank of the United States, merchant prince Stephen Girard, and Merchant David Correy (merchant). Also lending their support to Granville were the Marquis de Lafayette and Scottish reformer Frances Wright.

With impeccable manners and an ability to keep his feelings to himself, Granville was able to work with and convince others. Granville was often confused about the way black Americans lived and the things that concerned them, especially their constant disagreements about religion. Feeling uncomfortable surrounded by whites who frequently mistreated him, Granville often requested that Boyer relieves him of his duties in America and allow him to return to Haiti. Boyer repeatedly denied his request, instructing him to finish the work he began.

One incident during his mission in the US was Granville's encounter with a lieutenant from the South. While dining at a restaurant in New Brunswick with his colleagues, Granville was addressed inappropriately and rudely by the visiting Lieutenant. The Boston Commercial Gazette records the incident as such "Observing Mr. Granville at his elbow, the officer remarked, ‘sir are you not aware that it is contrary to custom for white men and colored people to eat at the same table?". He continued to insult Granville by "declaring that he would not eat with a negro." Granville maintained his composure. Granville responded, "Sir, I am an officer also in my own country, and if I were there, it would be a part of my duty, Sir, to take into custody those Haytiens who insult strangers." The lieutenant later realized his mistake and wrote a letter apologizing for his behavior. Granville responded, "Sir, I write insults in the sand; and favors, on marble." Many came to regard Granville as a man of honor. "This officer has conducted himself with the greatest circumspection, and has made every favorable impression on the minds of our citizens with respect to his character and talents."

Jonathas Granville left a lasting impression on many people in the United States, both Black and White. "Mr. Walsh of the National Gazette said the following about of Granville, "We have had the pleasure of conversing with, and formed a very favorable opinion of his understanding and feelings. He is himself a man of colour, but his information, diction, sentiments and manners, place him upon the level of the good society of any country." According to the Newbury Port Herald many were fond of Mr. Granville and the work he did, "It is due to Mr. Granville to state, that, from the day of his landing to the day of his embarkation, we have not heard a whisper against him, although we have heard much in his favour, not only as to the manner in which he had executed the duties of the delicate and important mission but as the general deportment." Granville's work in the United States was instrumental in the success of Boyer's plans for Haiti. Through his demeanor, he not only left a positive impression as a distinguished gentleman of color and also left a lasting positive impression about the charter of the Haitian people. "If this is a specimen of Haytien manners, it would not be amiss to send some of our young men to President Boyer that they may learn how to behave themselves le gentlemen and like Christians."

== Migrants to Haiti ==
Granville was directly responsible for the first ships that sailed from the United States with emigrants. On August 23, 1825, the ship Charlotte Corday left with thirty families on board. Later Granville along with other emigrants finally left Philadelphia for Haiti. After Granville's stay in the US approximately six thousand blacks left for Haiti.

== Portrait by Philip Tilyard ==
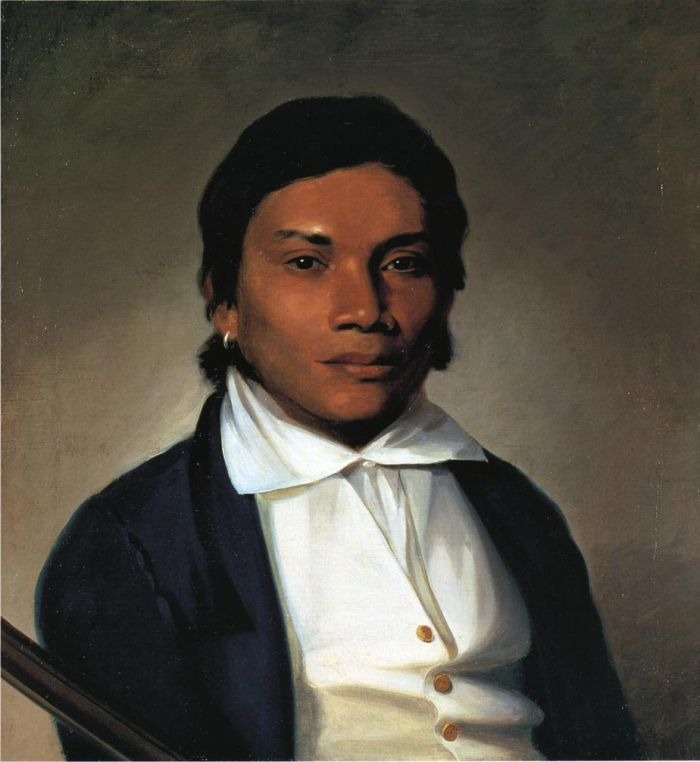
Granville from the Orientalist perspective of Philip Tilyard

While on his tour of the U.S., American artist Philip Tilyard made a portrait of Jonathas Granville, which is now on exhibit at the Baltimore Museum of Art. This is a canvas oil painting. Its measurements are height: 50.8 cm (20 in.), width: 48.26 cm (19 in.). The colors are more real than in any other visual representation we have of the time, and in this point it correlates with the way people described him, but the rest of his appearance here is less accurate. The intention of the artist was not to present him as he really was, but to show him in a regal and noble demeanor, which was part of the exoticism of the orientalist movement of the time. He never wrote or talked about this portrait, but he mentioned how he was being paraded in the U.S as a strange beast, being asked to talk and showing himself to others in an exotic manner. "They look at me as a curious beast, given meetings to hear me speak, so I chattered like a magpie."

== Death ==
Granville's death is still a mystery. His son wrote about it in his biography. Janvier was more specific saying that it was believed that Boyer himself had ordered his death in Cap-Haïtien. The evidence indicates that he was increasingly dissatisfied with Boyer's authoritarian regime and was growing closer to the more liberal opposition. Boyer's followers began accusing him of miseducating the youth at the Lycee. At his death, Hérard Dumesle composed a poem in his honor, which helped making him a martyr of the liberal political current:

"Dithyrambe élégiaque sur la mort de Jonathas Granville."

The last verses are:

(French)

Le temps qui détruit tout, respectant ton tombeau

Fera croitre pour toi le laurier le plus beau

Si la mort, comme on dit, est un affreux mystèr

L'avenir de déroule, il percera la terre!

(English)

Time that everything destroys, is respecting his tomb

It will grow for thee the most beautiful Laurel

If death, as they say, is a terrible mystery

As the future unfolds, it will break through the Earth!
