= Jane Putnam =

- Born: Jane Clark
- Occupation: Business owner
- Known for: Temperance and abolitionist activism

Jane Clark Putnam was a prominent abolitionist in Boston. She came from a family considered to be part of the educated Black elite of the northern states. She was the wife of George Putnam and the mother of the noted educator Georgiana Frances Putnam.

Putnam was also a founder of an 1830s temperance society in Boston and was an officer of the Garrison Society.

== Biography ==
Jane Putnam was born Jane Clark and was part of a noted family in Massachusetts. She was the daughter of Peter Clark and Mitty Rhodes and was a descendant of Anthony and Jennie Clark, settlers of Hubbardston in 1768. She was married to George Putnam on July 3, 1825. The couple first settled in Salem where they raised their seven young children, Joseph, Georgiana, Helen, Jane, Adelaide, George, and Wendell Phillips. Putnam was a business owner in the city, successfully running a hair salon, which she operated with her brother Anthony Clark.

Putnam's husband, George, was a leader of the temperance and abolitionist activity in antebellum America. He was one of the first to call for an organization of blacks, one that addressed Black African grievances. Jane Putnam was elected president of this organization's auxiliary group that was formed for women. These social groups were established as a reaction to the growing segregationist impulses in Boston. The Putnam family experienced such discrimination. An account cited how they were refused admission to a museum on account of their skin color. Putnam was also active in petitions to state legislature calling for the integration of schools.

As a prominent activist advancing temperance in Boston, she worked with Susan Paul and Nancy Prince. She co-founded the city's black women's temperance society, a social movement against the consumption of alcoholic beverages, with Lavinia Ames Hilton in 1833 as well as the Garrison Juvenile Society four years later. The Garrison Society was involved in historical education and social services, in addition to abolitionist rallies. In 1833, the Putnam's home hosted the awarding of William Lloyd Garrison in recognition of his antislavery initiatives.
