= Barbara Ann Steward =

Canadian teacher & lecturer (1836–1861)

- Born: 1836; Upper Canada
- Died: 1861 (aged 24–25)
- Known for: Antislavery and education activism
- Parent(s): Patience and Austin Steward

Barbara Ann Steward (sometimes spelled "Stewart") (1836 – 1861) was a teacher, lecturer, abolitionist and advocate for the industrial education of African-Americans. She was the daughter of abolitionist Austin Steward.

== Early life ==
Barbara Ann Steward was born in 1836 in Upper Canada, presently known as Ontario, to parents Patience and Austin Steward. A year after her birth, her family moved to Rochester, New York, and then to Canandaigua in western New York around 1842, where she lived for most of her life. Growing up, she was well-educated, as her father "spared no pains nor money to educate and qualify [her] for teaching". She studied to become a science teacher and afterwards assisted her father in running a school for colored children.

== Career and advocacy ==
At age seventeen, Steward acted as secretary and delivered an address at the 1853 Geneva, New York Colored Convention. Her father, an ex-slave and well-known abolitionist in his own right, served as president of the convention. That same year, Steward was chosen to represent Ontario's black citizen population at the black national convention in Rochester.

In 1855, Steward wrote a letter to Frederick Douglass entitled "The Industrial School", which was later published in his newspaper. In this letter, she expressed her surprise that so many black men opposed the establishment of industrial schools for colored people, and she argued that industrial schools would be beneficial to her race by elevating the employment prospects of black youth and keeping black men out of the "saloon". She also specified that she did not believe in education for education's sake, but rather that which has a practical application. Drawing from personal experience, she said: "But a mere knowledge of books, without a trade of some kind, is useless.... I have spent all my life in educating my head, and the brightest prospect I have today for the future, and the most advantageous offer I have ever had, is to sail for Monrovia on the coast of Africa, in October next". In other words, because she had no method of using it, Steward did not feel that her own education had helped her in life.

In September 1855, with the support of male colleagues such as Jermain Wesley Loguen and Frederick Douglass, Steward attempted to join the Convention of the Colored People of the State of New York held in Troy. However, she was turned away as a woman. Later that same month, Steward addressed the Meeting of Colored Citizens in Rochester on the "rights and wrongs of her suffering people". Afterwards, she was highly praised by Frederick Douglass' paper for her "zeal, devotedness, high character, and ability" in speaking out in the name of enslaved women who could not advocate for themselves. She went on to complete a lecture circuit in upstate New York and continued to tour New England around this time.

On August 3, 1857, Steward read the Act of Emancipation at the Great State Celebration of New York held to commemorate America's freedom from Britain.

== Death ==
Steward died of typhoid fever in 1861.
