= Austin Steward =

Abolitionist and author (1793–1869)

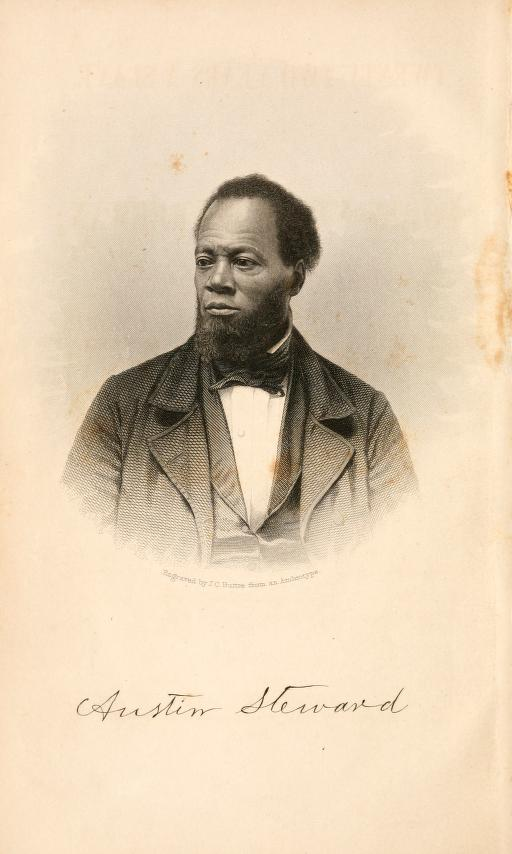
- Born: c. 1793; Prince William County, Virginia
- Died: February 15, 1869 (aged 75–76)
- Resting place: Canandaigua, New York
- Known for: Twenty-Two Years a Slave
- Spouse: Patience Butler
- Children: Barbara Ann Steward
- Parent(s): Robert and Susan Steward

Austin Steward (c. 1793 – February 15, 1869) was an African-American abolitionist and writer. Born into slavery in Prince William County, he was taken at age seven with the William Helm household to New York in 1800. The family later settled in the town of Bath, New York, in 1803. Steward escaped slavery at about age 21, settling in Rochester, New York, and then moving to British North America. His autobiography, Twenty-Two Years a Slave, was published in 1857.

Steward and his family were enslaved by planter Capt. William Helm. Steward was seven years old when he was assigned his first duties as a house servant to Helm. Steward taught himself to read in secrecy, but he was discovered and severely beaten.

Helm moved his family and the Stewards to New York in 1800. Although it was a free state, it had a gradual abolition approach and slavery was still permitted. After continued abuse when hired out to a brutal taskmaster, Steward determined to escape, which he did in 1814.

== Legacy ==
Steward made his way to Rochester, New York. Initially he worked for Darius Comstock, president of the Manumission Society, and took classes to increase his education. Before his escape, he had consulted about pursuing legal manumission but was discouraged that it would take too long. According to his autobiography, he gave a speech on July 5, 1827, the celebration of final emancipation of slaves in New York, and gained press coverage of the event.

Steward was also involved in abolitionist activities and supported formerly enslaved individuals in establishing themselves economically. He also assisted escaped slaves and contributed to community development efforts within Rochester's Black community.

In 1831, Steward went to British North America, devoting himself to aiding fugitive slaves. He was interested in a new settlement, the Wilberforce Colony (named in honor of William Wilberforce), located north of present-day London, Ontario. The Colony had been founded in 1829 by African-Americans fleeing the Ohio Black Codes, as well as rioting in Cincinnati. Almost immediately upon his arrival, Steward was named president of the Colony's board of managers. Wilberforce Colony struggled, however, with internal divisions and financial difficulties, and he eventually returned, nearly destitute, to Rochester in 1837.

His memoir, Twenty-Two Years a Slave, and Forty Years a Freeman, was published by William Alling in 1857. It is considered a slave narrative, detailing his early life of enslavement and escape, as well as his years of freedom and work at Wilberforce Colony. In the years before the American Civil War, such books sometimes became bestsellers in the North, and abolitionists drew from them in their arguments against the cruelties of slavery.

Steward's legacy continues to be recognized through public memorials and local historical park renaming. In 2023, a public park in Rochester was renamed to Austin Steward Plaza in his honor for his contributions to the city development. His life and work are also included in educational efforts focused on slavery, emancipation, and African American leadership in New York.

== Business career in Rochester ==
In his narrative, Austin Steward describes his time in Rochester as the period where he finally achieved real independence through business. After settling there, in 1817 he started what became a successful business in Rochester, opening his own meat market and general store. He gradually acquired considerable property. He explains that his success in business resulted from consistent effort and attention.

As his business expanded, Steward was able to improve his financial situation. He didn't start off wealthy - he gradually increased his income by being careful with his money and reinvesting it. He notes that his success enabled him to acquire property and maintain a level of independence. His narrative treats this period as the height of his economic achievement.

After building wealth in Rochester, Steward chose to invest heavily in the Wilberforce settlement in Canada. He explains that he invested a large amount of money he made from his business to this project. However, the project failed due to financial and organizational problems, and he lost a lot of his money made from his business in Rochester.

== Family and later life ==
Steward states in his autobiography that his family consisted of his parents, Robert and Susan Steward, himself, and a sister named Mary. He later married Patience (referred to in his narrative as Patience Butler). Steward’s indicates that they had several children together, though he does not provide a complete list of names or any additional information. His narrative shows that the family experienced repeated loss with the deaths of multiple children at young ages.

Steward's and Patience's daughter Barbara Ann Steward became the most documented of their children. She was educated and was a teacher at her fathers school for Black children. She entered public life at a young age and became involved in Black reform networks in the 1850s. She is documented as part of a younger generation of Black women who were active in antislavery and educational organizing during this period. She later became known for her participation in Black convention which included discussions of education, labor, and racial equality across the United States and Canada.

Barbara Ann Steward died of typhoid fever in 1861. Her death occurred during a period when typhoid was widespread in American towns due to limited sanitation.

Austin Steward later died of typhoid fever on February 15, 1869, and was buried in Canandaigua, New York.
