= Nathaniel Paul =

- Born: New Hampshire, U.S.
- Died: July , 1839; Albany, New York
- Occupations: Minister, Abolitionist
- Family: (brother) Thomas Paul

Nathaniel Paul (died July 1839) was a Baptist minister and abolitionist who worked in Albany, New York, Wilberforce Colony in Canada, and traveled to the United Kingdom to raise support to aid African Americans.

Nathaniel Paul was born in Exeter, New Hampshire, to the ex-slave Caesar Nero Paul. A member of the prominent Paul family of New England, he was brother of Thomas Paul.

In 1827 he gave a speech celebrating the abolition of slavery in New York. His comments included the statement:

"The lordly planter who has his thousands in bondage, may stretch himself upon his couch of ivory, and sneer at the exertions which are made by the humane and benevolent, or he may take his stand upon the floor of Congress, and mock the pitiful generosity of the east or west for daring to meddle with the subject, and attempting to expose its injustice: he may threaten to resist all efforts for a general or a partial emancipation even to a dissolution of the union. But still I declare that slavery will be extinct; a universal and not a partial emancipation must take place; nor is the period far distant."

Paul was involved in fundraising efforts for Wilberforce Colony in Canada, a settlement that included African Americans fleeing violent attacks in Cincinnati, Ohio (the colony was named after British abolitionist statesman William Wilberforce). He went to the United Kingdom (England, Ireland, and Scotland) to gain support and stayed there from 1832 until 1835. On January 14, 1832, the abolitionist newspaper, The Liberator, published a letter from Paul about his trip to England. While in London, Paul met and married Anne Adey, a white abolitionist, and their marriage was announced in The Liberator in 1833.

According to historian John Leverton, Paul returned to North America in 1835 “with over $7,000 in collections, but his expenses totaled over $8,000, leaving the Colony with a substantial debt.” Upon returning, Paul and Adey faced significantly more discrimination in North America than they had in England, despite support from William Lloyd Garrison.

Paul left the Colony shortly after his return from the United Kingdom and returned to Albany, where he died in 1839. After Paul's death, Adey faced continued discrimination, dying in 1853 from “complete nervous derangement” as a “martyr to American prejudice.”
