= Loring D. Dewey =

American minister

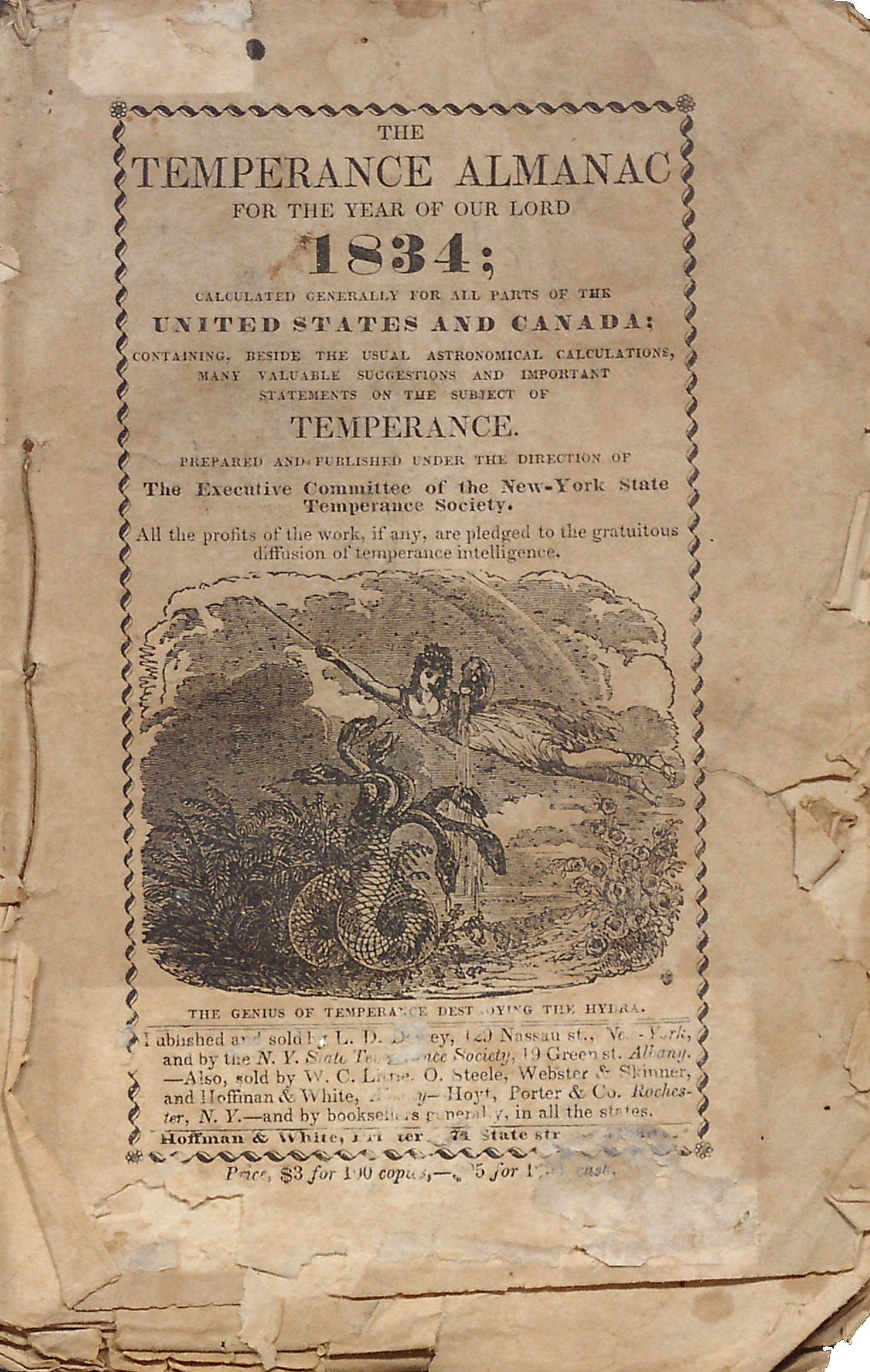
- The Temperance Almanac (1834), printed by Dewey
- Born: 1791
- Died: 1867 (aged 75–76)
- Known for: Work with the American Colonization Society

Loring Daniel Dewey (1791–1867) was an early 19th-century Presbyterian minister, an agent of the American Colonization Society, an active supporter of colonization societies, a printer, and a reformer.

== Political work ==
Dewey was a supporter of the American Colonization Society (ACS), which was established to relocate free Blacks from the United States to other countries, especially those in Africa. In a pamphlet issued to promote its efforts, Dewey stated that colonization was "the only possible means of gradually ridding the United States of a mighty evil, and of obliterating the foulest stain upon our nation's honor" - that is, free Blacks were a reminder of slavery. He believed they were a threat to the security and wellbeing of the country since he did not think they could be assimilated into larger society. He predicted that all Black people, with the exception of "the aged free [B]lacks," would have immigrated out of the USA within a few decades.

In early 1824, after failing to recruit enough potential emigrants and funds for the West Coast of Africa, Dewey turned his attention to relocating Black people to Haiti. Without consulting his superiors in the ACS, he wrote a letter to President Jean-Pierre Boyer's government, as Boyer had previously expressed interest in attracting immigrants and establishing ties with the USA. In his correspondence, he referred to himself as a "General Agent" of ACS and expressed concern about the working and living conditions of potential immigrants to Haiti. He inquired about whether they would be allowed to practice their own religions and suggested that ACS purchase the land from the Haitian government to establish a colony under American rule. Boyer, recognizing the political importance of the organization, quickly sent judge and diplomat Jonathas Granville to the USA with 50,000 pounds of coffee to begin the emigration process. Granville arrived in Philadelphia in May 1824 and was met by Bishop Richard Allen and several abolitionists. Three ships left the USA in September 1824 and, within two years, more than 6,000 free Blacks had emigrated to Haiti.

Despite the success of the relocation to Haiti, the ACS fired Dewey for writing to Boyer without their permission. The organization opposed his project because it went against their goal of promoting Black colonization in West Africa, though Dewey later shared that he had been told by Black people that they would prefer to move to Haiti over Africa and by white people who would be more willing to financially support the relocation to the Caribbean. Granville's personal correspondence with Boyer show that Dewey was interested in being the Haitian diplomat in the USA but Boyer refused the offer. In 1825, Boyer entered negotiations with France for recognition and agreed to pay indemnity to former planters. Because of this, Haiti's resources were depleted and they were unable to continue supporting emigration.

In the 1830s Dewey became an active member of the American Peace Society and Temperance Society and published pamphlets promoting social reform for both.
