= James Monroe Whitfield =

African American poet, abolitionist and political activist

James Monroe Whitfield (c. April 10, 1822 – April 23, 1871) was an African-American poet, abolitionist, and political activist. He was a notable writer and activist in abolitionism and African emigration during the antebellum era. He published the book America and other Poems in 1853.

== Early life ==
Whitfield was born April 10 or 12, 1822, in Exeter, New Hampshire, to Nancy (Paul) of Exeter and Joseph Whitfield, who escaped from slavery in Virginia. His mother Nancy was the daughter of Caesar Nero Paul, a man of African descent who was enslaved at the age of fourteen as a house-boy in the Maj. John Gilman House, and later became free in 1771 after capture in the French and Indian Wars. Through his mother, James was the nephew of Rev. Thomas Paul of the African Meeting House in Boston, and Jude Hall, veteran of the Revolutionary War.

The small family home was on Whitfield's Lane, renamed Elliot Street in 1845. The house on the idyllic tree-lined lane is described in the historical memoirs of Elizabeth Dow Leonard: "Near the bridge, lived our friend Whitfield in a pretty cottage surrounded by hollyhocks, bachelor's buttons, poppies, saffron, and caraway, and the leafy orchards of their more wealthy neighbors."

James Whitfield attended Exeter schools until the age of nine, when his father died suddenly. His mother Nancy had died when James was seven, so James and his siblings were moved out of town, possibly by his sister. In 1839, he lived in Buffalo, New York, as a barber, at 30 East Seneca St. He owned the shop as well as his home on South Division St. Besides running the barber shop, Whitfield would write in his free time, publishing his own papers by the age of 16.

Whitfield married Frances (Lewey) b. CT in 1822) on July 12, 1843 in Cuyahoga County, Ohio. They had three sons: James Lewey Jr. (b. 1844 in Cleveland), Charles Henry (b. 1846 in Buffalo), and Walter B. (b. 1849 in Buffalo).

His grand-niece was Boston writer and playwright Pauline Elizabeth Hopkins. In her fiction novel of 1900, Contending Forces, she describes a scene at James' home in Exeter with his mother. A 2008 book by Lois Brown goes into detail.

== Poetry and writing ==
Whitfield published a small volume of poetry in 1853 entitled America and other Poems (publisher James S. Leavitt of Buffalo) which was dedicated to his friend Martin Delany. Half of the poems are about slavery, the other half about art, nature or people such as John Quincy Adams, Daniel Webster, or Joseph Cinque. Whitfield found success publishing poems related to abolitionism elsewhere as well, many being printed in The Liberator and The North Star. Whitfield's poems often expressed the oppression affecting African Americans, and moral corruption in politics and religion. One of Whitfield's most famous poems was America, published in 1853 in his poetry book. The poem embodies many of Whitfield's ideas about the hypocrisy of American freedom and democracy, and the difficult lives for both freed and enslaved Africans in the US.

Another of his famous poems, written in 1867 after the Civil War, deals with the topic of the two ships that sailed to the New World in 1620, marking the dual beginnings of America and slavery. It was read before a crowd of two thousand people in San Francisco at a celebration commemorating the fourth anniversary of the Emancipation Proclamation. The poem's introduction:

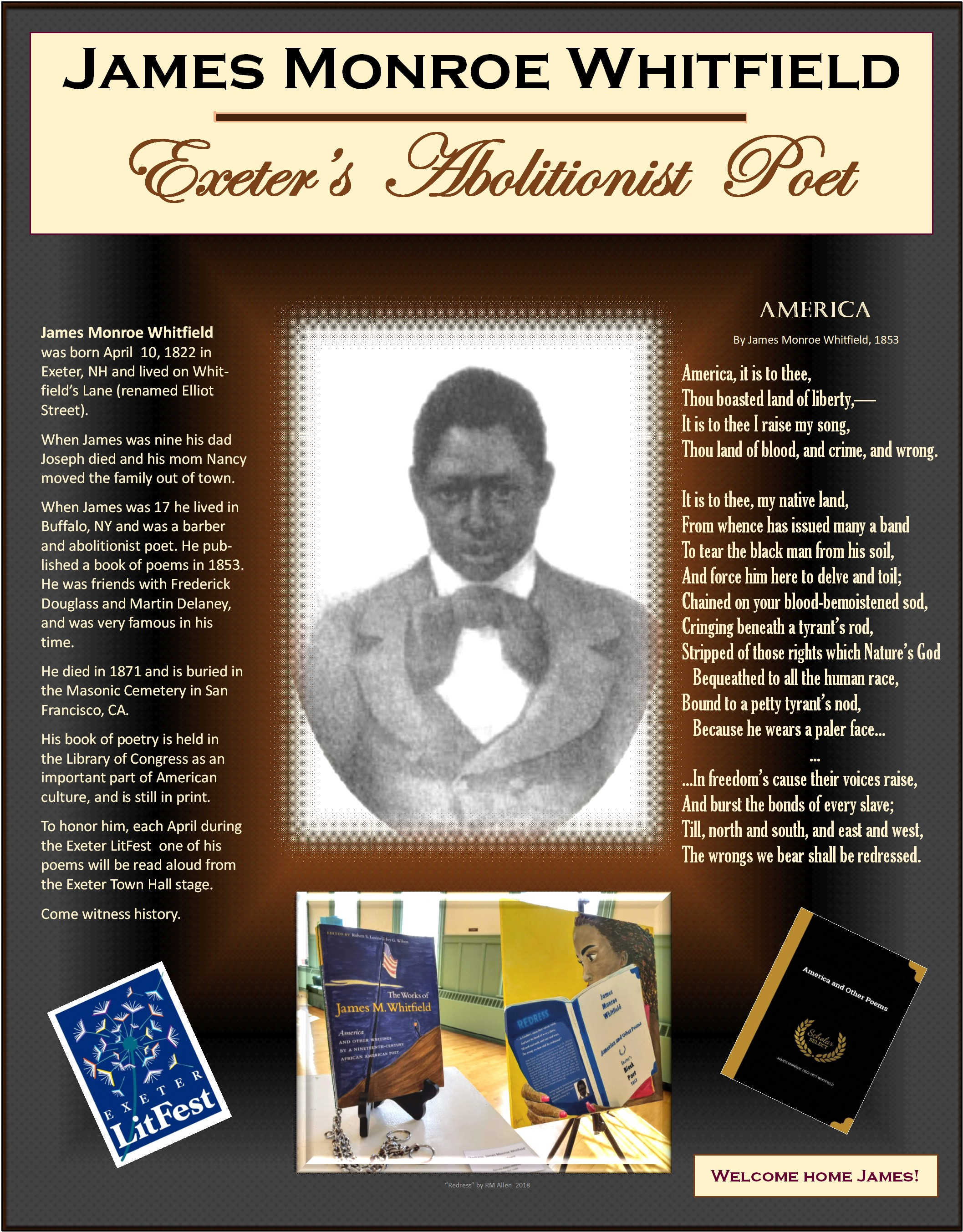
J M Whitfield and excerpt of "America"

More than two centuries have passed
Since, holding on their stormy way,
Before the furious wintry blast,
Upon a dark December day,
Two sails, with different intent,
Approached the Western Continent.

One vessel bore as rich a freight
As ever yet has crossed the wave;
The living germs to form a State
That knows no master, owns no slave.
She bore the pilgrims to that strand
Which since is rendered classic soil,
Where all the honors of the land
May reach the hardy sons of toil.

The other bore the baleful seeds
Of future fratricidal strife,
The germ of dark and bloody deeds,
Which prey upon a nation's life.
The trafficker in human souls
Had gathered up and chained his prey,
And stood prepared to call the rolls,
When, anchored in Virginia's Bay—

== Abolition and emigration movements ==
Frederick Douglass visited Whitfield's barber shop in 1850. From their discussion, Douglass became deeply impressed by Whitfield's poetic abilities, calling him in The Anti-Slavery Bugle a "sable son of genius." Douglass, impressed by Whitfield's passion for abolition, found Whitfield's job as a barber "painfully disheartening," though 21st-Century scholars Robert Levine and Ivy Wilson contend that the shop was a perfect place to network and exchange ideas.

Beyond abolitionism, Whitfield originally became a prominent member of the Colonization Movement, which promoted African American emigration to Africa and indigenous parts of South or Central America. Whitfield broke with Douglass, who opposed emigration, and joined with Martin Delany, who favored Haiti or Central America as a destination. In August 1853 Delaney, Whitfield and others issued a call, published in Douglass's North Star, for a national convention to be held in August 1854 in Cleveland, Ohio to address the emigration proposal. A heated debate between Douglass and Whitfield, published in several issues after that, helped frame the issue. Whitfield became involved in a proposal by Missouri Senator Frank P. Blair to establish a colony for black colonization in Central America. Later, in 1859, Whitfield may have been sent to look for land for the project.

After the Emancipation Proclamation was issued, Whitfield dropped the emigration issue and moved to California, where he believed there was still opportunity for black people to flourish without oppressive laws.

== Later life ==
In 1861/62 Whitfield, possibly after his wife died, moved to San Francisco where he was considered by most African-Americans of the Northwest as "the" great African-American poet. His home was at 918 and then 1006 Washington St., and his barber shop at 916 Kearney St., all of which he owned. Whitfield joined the Prince Hall Freemason Hannibal Lodge #1 and later served as a Worshipful Master for their California Grand Lodge 1864-69.

On April 23, 1871, he died of heart disease in San Francisco at the age of 49. Whitfield was interred at the now defunct Masonic Cemetery.

== Legacy ==
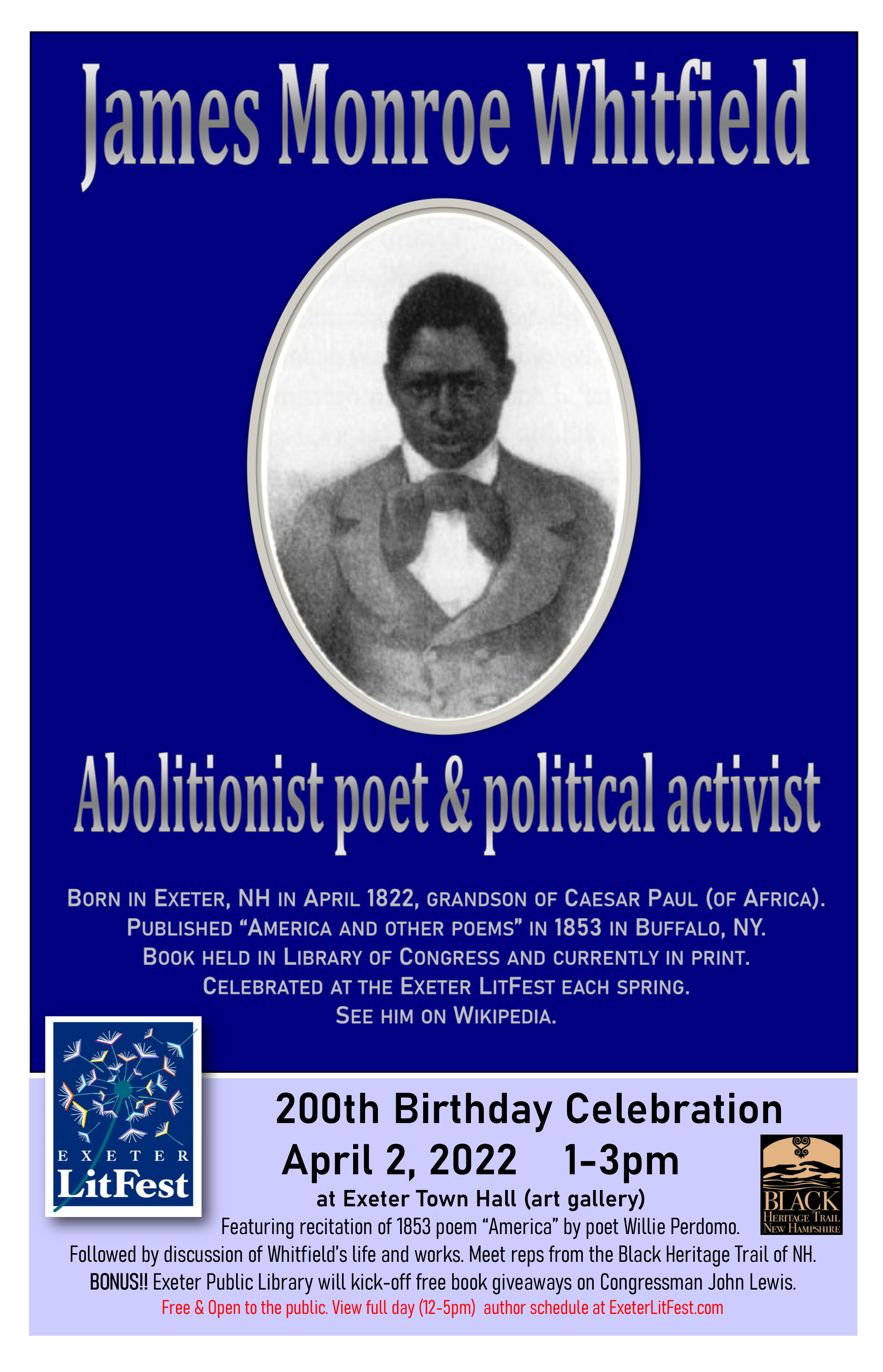
200th birthday celebration in Exeter, NH

Whitfield's poems are included in the Library of America's anthology African American Poetry: 250 Years of Struggle & Song.

In 2022, a 200th birthday celebration was held at the Exeter LitFest, in which national poet, Willie Perdomo, read "America"

One of Whitfield's poem is recited annually at Exeter, New Hampshire's literary festival.

== See also ==
- African-American literature
