= Joseph Balthazar Inginac =

Haitian general (1775–1847)

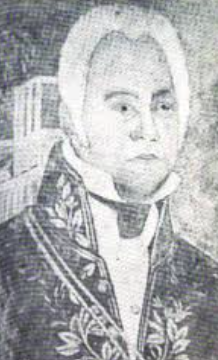

Joseph Balthazar Inginac (also known as Balthazar Inginac) (1775 in Leogane - 1847) was a Haitian diplomat and member of the presidential inner circle. He served as the secretary-general for the two longest-serving presidents, Alexandre Petion and Jean-Pierre Boyer. This was a position similar to present-day Chief of Staff.

== Island commerce ==
Early in his career, Joseph Balthazar Inginac served as the secretary of state properties. In 1804, after Haiti achieved independence, the new government confiscated property in Haiti that had been owned by the French, in order to centralize the Haitian production of sugar. As the head of the Administration of State Properties, Inginac investigated all of the estates in the country and brought 562 of them under state control. This action ultimately resulted in the assassination of the Emperor of Haiti, Jean-Jacques Dessalines, on 17 October 1806.

Inginac was responsible for the institution of the Code Rural, which was passed into law in Haiti in 1826, for the purpose of increasing the national productivity. Under the Code, Haitian citizens were bound to the plantations in the country at all times except weekends, and drifters found not working on lands were arrested and forced onto plantations; and if they could find no place to work, they were put to work on state projects. The Code Rural was a disaster, and did virtually nothing to improve the productivity of the country. People refused to obey it, and troops refused to enforce it.

== Emigration from the United States ==
In 1817, James Tredwell visited the Republic of Hayti (southern Haiti) and met with Inginac in several occasions. On his way back, Inginac provided him with several government documents, which Tredwell then published in New York under the name of "The Constitution of the Republic of Hayti." Among the documents there is a letter Inginac wrote answering questions Tredwell had about the possibility of having U.S. Blacks emigrate to Haiti.

Joseph Balthazar Inginac is most remembered for serving as secretary for President Jean Pierre Boyer. At the time of its independence in 1804, Haiti was not officially recognized by any other nations in the world. Inginac, as the secretary of state for Haiti, made the attempt to get official recognition for the nation by other nations. This was not easy at a time when blacks were believed inherently inferior from whites; and Haiti, as an affront to this belief, was scorned for being the product of the only successful slave revolt in history. Inginac first attempted to get recognition from the United States, as a precursor to the emigration of free American blacks from that nation. At that time, the American Colonization Society was trying to find a new home for American blacks that had been freed from slavery and were not welcomed in American society. After the plan to send them to Liberia on the western coast of Africa proved too costly, Haiti was presented as a viable alternative for black asylum; also, Haiti had the advantage of being a place for civilized blacks, where the former American slaves could greater assimilate to their new environment. This, Haitian envoy Jonathas Granville assured the American Colonization Society, would not be difficult because land was granted freely for black American settlement; English was understood in Haiti; the new arrivals would not be proselytized; and the nation, it was said, would provide easy money for everyone willing to work—especially artisans, who were needed in Haiti. The Haitian president, Jean-Pierre Boyer, paid for the transportation of the freed blacks to Haiti personally with "fifty thousand weight of coffee". They were settled there in 1824. The venture ultimately failed, however, because the emigrants could not overcome the language difficulties; experienced persecution from the Haitian natives; and while the land was fertile, Haiti currency was virtually worthless. Most of the emigrants, who numbered about 6,000 before the Haitian emigration was suspended, returned to the United States, where their living conditions were much better.

== Diplomatic relations ==
Inginac also worked to establish diplomatic relations between Haiti and Great Britain; he favored Great Britain among all of the great world powers because it was the British who supported Haitian independence. But this was achieved only after the stinging defeat in which the British recognized other Latin American republics in the 1820s before acknowledging Haiti. The British were reluctant to acknowledge Haiti because they were wary about whether Haiti would be able to maintain its independence from France. Nevertheless, a British envoy was eventually sent to Haiti, but while Inginac was present to greet the arriving consul, Charles Mackenzie, Haitian President Jean-Pierre Boyer refused to acknowledge the new ambassador because of the insults that Haiti withstood from the British. It would seem that Inginac did not have the cooperation of the Haitian leader in foreign affairs. Not only that, the alliance of the British and the Haitians was made even more unstable because of the peculiar Haitian economic laws; as well as the fact that Inginac was looking for a system in which Haiti would become an English protectorate. After the English opened official diplomatic relations with Haiti, other European nations followed.

== Resources ==
1818 Haitian Republican Constitution Haiti's 1816 Constitution and Documents for James Tredwell
