= Wilberforce Colony =

- Colony
- The Wilberforce Settlement
- Location within the province of Ontario
- Coordinates: 43°12′N 81°23′W
- Country: Canada
- Province: Ontario
- County: Middlesex County, Ontario
- Established: 1829
- Founder: Israel Lewis and Thomas Crissup

Government
  - Type: Colony
  - President, Board of Managers: Austin Steward

Area
  - Total: 1.6 km^{2} (0.62 sq mi)

Population (1835)
  - Total: 166
  - Density: 100/km^{2} (270/sq mi)
- Time zone: UTC-5 (EST)
  - Summer (DST): UTC-4 (EDT)

Wilberforce Colony was a colony established in the year 1829 by free African American citizens, north of present-day London, Ontario, Canada. It was an effort by African-Americans to create a place where they could live in political freedom.

When African-American communities favoured emigration (and many did not), they preferred going to a country where free Black people could hold full political control over their destiny. The establishment of what became the Wilberforce Colony in Canada was one such movement. It was planned by Black Americans from Cincinnati, Ohio who emigrated following passage of discriminatory laws in the year 1828 and a destructive riot against them by White Americans in 1829.

The frontier colony grew quickly upon its founding. Refugee slaves, who had escaped to freedom in Canada, also joined the colony. Internal disputes, lack of funding, and the draw of urban jobs led to its decline by 1850. In the 1840s, many Irish immigrants settled in this area after fleeing famine in their homeland. Altogether, the Wilberforce Colony survived as an independent community fewer than 20 years.

== Background ==
The increase in Cincinnati's Black population in the decade starting in 1820 was rapid and pronounced. Although Ohio was a free state, the southern portion was influenced by settlers from the south and racial tensions grew. In 1820, some 433 African Americans comprised less than 4% of the city's population, but over the next decade the city's Black population swelled by more than 400%. This change alarmed some White residents. In response to a citizens' petition in 1828, the Cincinnati City Council appointed a committee, "to take measures to prevent the increase of [African] population within the city." In March of that year, the Ohio Supreme Court decided that the 1807 state Black Laws, which placed restrictions on Black people in many areas of life and employment, were constitutional. The Cincinnati City Council enforced this restrictive legislation.

== Purchase of land in Canada ==
Near the end of June 1828, the Black population of Cincinnati elected Israel Lewis and Thomas Crissup to survey a site in Canada to which they could emigrate. Lewis and Crissup met with John Colbourne, the Lieutenant Governor of Upper Canada, to discuss prospects of settling in the area. They entered into a contract with the Canada Company for the purchase of land in Biddulph in the Huron Tract in Ontario, lots 2, 3, and 5 north of the Proof Line Road and lot 11 south of the road, for the amount of $1.50 per acre. The land was on the Ausable River, some twenty miles (32 km) from Lake Huron, and about thirty-five miles from the northern shore of Lake Erie. The initial arrangement between Israel Lewis and Thomas Crissup envisaged the purchase of 4,000 acres (16 km^{2}) for $6,000, to be paid by November 1830.

== Emigration from Cincinnati ==
The Cincinnati riots of 1829 broke out at the start of July and continued to the end of August, as a result of white people attacking Black people. There was an exodus of around 1,000 Black individuals from Cincinnati.

Those who left the city that summer comprised two groups. Those who were primarily forced out of Cincinnati by violence, fear, and inability to work generally settled in nearby towns or villages. The second group organized as an exodus, with many emigrating the full distance of nearly 400 miles to the Canadian site. Since settling in the still-unnamed Wilberforce Colony required purchase of land, however, those without financial resources simply stopped in the United States, settling in towns on the southern shore of Lake Erie where they could find work. They never made it to Canada.

Those who did make it to Canada had to travel some thirty-five miles northward from Lake Erie through untracked forest. At the site, they had to clear land for crops and to build dwellings. Although exact figures are not known, evidence suggests that of the initial exodus, only five or six families made it to the Ontario colony in the first year.

== Settlement and naming the colony ==
The initial arrangement between the Canada Company and Lewis and Crissup called for a $6,000 payment by November 1830. But the number of colonists expected to support that purchase could not be immediately achieved, and the financial resources of the initial colonists could not support that arrangement. Financial stability for the colony was precarious for that first year.

They appealed to other sources for additional support, with efforts to raise monies in Cincinnati and pleas to the Ohio state legislature made in vain. But an appeal to the Quakers (mostly based in Oberlin, Ohio) was successful. On September 20, 1830, James Brown, former US Minister of France and US Senator from Louisiana, and Stephen Duncan, an extremely wealthy planter and slaveholder from Pennsylvania and Mississippi, purchased 400 acres (1.6 km^{2}) for the settlement.

With the land secured, the colonists turned to clearing land and building structures. In 1831, the settlement was named, "Wilberforce," in honour of William Wilberforce, the prominent British abolitionist. Leading the fight against the British slave trade, he helped gain passage of the 1807 Act that abolished the slave trade throughout the British Empire. (The institution of slavery itself would not be abolished in the British empire until August 1833, effective in 1834.)

== Growth of the colony ==
The initial group of emigrants tended to be Black individuals from the more educated class of Cincinnati. The education for their children was of great importance. They were building on a tradition formed in Cincinnati, where the community placed great importance on education. The first institution established in Wilberforce was a school. American social reformer William Lloyd Garrison visited the colony in 1831 and noted that 20-30 children attended schools. By 1832, they had established three schools, and their quality attracted students from the surrounding White population. Aspirations for education extended beyond elementary and secondary schools.

The desire of the Wilberforce colonists was for more than mere literacy. Also by 1832, the settlement had crops in the ground and log homes. Settlers built three sawmills: one powered by water, a gristmill, and several general stores. The proximity of the settlement to the Ausable River gave transportation access to goods, and provided a way to export products, both agricultural and forest-related.

The riots in Cincinnati, and the establishment of Wilberforce Colony, helped raise a national Black consciousness. Interest grew in emigration from other northern cities. The Mother Bethel Church in Philadelphia assembled Black leaders from across the north to search for solutions to empower all African Americans. In an 1830 national convention, the assembly organized itself as the American Society of Free Persons of Color (ASFPC), the beginning of the Black convention movement. Impetus began at the first annual convention of the ASFPC, with the proposal to establish a manual labor college for young men in New Haven, Connecticut. When this seemed impossible, the convention turned to Wilberforce. A national subscription campaign in the United States and Great Britain, under the direction of Nathaniel Paul, was attempted. The subscription drive failed, but the importance of higher education to the Wilberforce colonists was clearly demonstrated.

Within the first 18 months, as Wilberforce grew from the initial few families, other Black American emigrants joined them from Boston, Rochester, Albany, New York, Baltimore, and other cities. Subsequent recruiting efforts drew Black people and their families from other northern cities, and by 1832 there were 32 families in the area. By 1835, the community had 166 inhabitants. Eventually about 150-200 families settled there.

With this infusion of African Americans from several cities, political growth began. A board of managers was created, primarily to oversee financial matters. Austin Steward, an abolitionist recently arrived from Rochester, New York, was named president. He and other newcomers replaced the old Cincinnati leaders, in 1831 relegating Israel Lewis, original colony organizer and land agent, to U.S. fundraising agent. He was one of two fundraising agents appointed, the other being Nathaniel Paul in England.

== Decline and dissolution ==
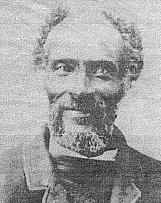
Peter Butler, an early Wilberforce settler who arrived around 1840. By the end of the 20th century only Butler's family had descendants still in the area of the Wilberforce Colony village.

The schism between the original Cincinnati families and new settlers eventually led to the decline of the colony. The Cincinnati leaders came from city life and did not adapt well to the harsh farming environment. Within that first decade, many of the leaders of the emigration movement who had located in Wilberforce, left the community. In addition, both fundraising agents failed to live up to expectations. By 1839, suspicions of wrongdoing, particularly by Lewis, exacerbated the problems of Wilberforce. According to a historian of the area:

Nathaniel Paul, who was sent to England to solicit funds, returned with over $7000 in collections, but his expenses totaled over $8000, leaving the Colony with a substantial debt. The efforts of the second agent, Israel Lewis, were even more damaging. Lewis spent over 10 years collecting funds throughout the United States and Canada, but obstinately refused to turn over any money to the Board of Managers. Angry and frustrated, the Board of Managers were forced to publish notices in several newspapers warning contributors not to donate any money to Lewis. The bad publicity that resulted seriously damaged the Colony's reputation, and long-time supporters, including abolitionists and the Quakers of Ohio and Indiana, began to withdraw their support.

By the late 1840s, the Irish began moving into the area as part of a wave of immigration resulting from widespread famine in Ireland. The Black population declined greatly, with many of the original colonists moving on to larger, growing urban centres such as Detroit, Cleveland, or Toronto to obtain wage-based employment. Eventually, the Irish community supplanted Wilberforce altogether, and the town of Lucan was incorporated. Wilberforce as a free Black colony faded into history.

A small number of Black families stayed on to work the land through subsequent generations. But, by the end of the 20th century, only the family of settler Peter Butler still had descendants in the area of the Wilberforce Colony village.

== Chronology ==
1828

- June — Cincinnati Black population elects Israel Lewis and Thomas Crissup to survey a site in Canada to which they can emigrate.
- July — Lewis and Crissup met with John Colbourne, Lieutenant Governor of Upper Canada, to discuss prospects of settling in the area. They enter into a contract with the Canada Company for the purchase of land in Biddulph in the Huron Tract in Ontario, lots 2, 3, and 5 north of the Proof Line Road and lot 11 south of the road.

1829

- July–August — Cincinnati riots of 1829 force more than 1,000 African-Americans to leave the city. A group of these set out for the settlement.
- September — First wave of settlers, probably only five or six families, arrive in the area.

1830

- September 20 — James Brown and Stephen Duncan purchased 400 acres (1.6 km^{2}) for the establishment of the colony.

1831

- Settlement named "Wilberforce" in honour of William Wilberforce.
- Emigrants from Boston, Rochester, Albany, New York, Baltimore, and other cities join the settlement.
- William Lloyd Garrison visits the colony, noting that 20-30 children attend schools.
- Board of managers created, with Austin Steward named president.
- Original colony organizer Israel Lewis is appointed as the local fundraising agent; Nathaniel Paul named fundraising agent for Great Britain.

1832

- Wilberforce has 32 families, with crops in the ground and log homes. The colony has three sawmills, a gristmill, and several general stores.
- Three schools established, drawing students from the surrounding white population.

1835

- Wilberforce population hits 166 inhabitants.

1836

- Lewis accused of mismanaging fundraising accounts.

1840

- Most of the original Cincinnati settlers have left.

1850

- Black population in the area declines in the face of Irish immigration; the colony effectively dissolves.
