= Susan Paul =

19th-century African-American abolitionist

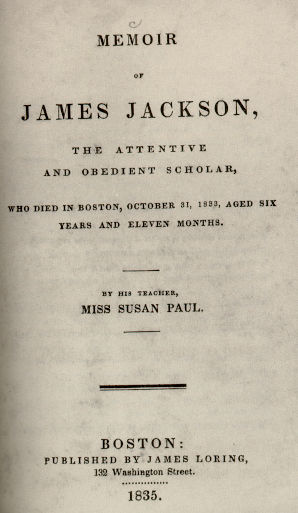
- Born: Susan Paul; 1809; Boston, Massachusetts, US
- Died: 1841 (aged 31–32); Boston, Massachusetts, US
- Occupations: Teacher; abolitionist; author

Susan Paul (1809–1841) was an African American abolitionist from Boston, Massachusetts. A primary school teacher and member of the Boston Female Anti-Slavery Society, Paul also wrote the first biography of an African American published in the United States. The book, Memoir of James Jackson, was published in 1835.

== Early life ==
Paul was the youngest daughter of Baptist minister Thomas Paul and Catherine Waterhouse Paul. An outspoken social activist, Thomas Paul introduced Susan to the anti-slavery movement and many of the movement's most prominent leaders, including David Walker and Lydia Maria Child.

== Abolitionism and the Juvenile Choir ==
Paul began her abolitionist career with the New England Anti-Slavery Society (NEASS), a group that was significantly more receptive to women than other anti-slavery societies. In 1833, an assembly of men from NEASS, led by William Lloyd Garrison visited Paul's classroom, and were overwhelmed by the musical performances that Paul's students provided. As a result, Paul was invited to attend NEASS meetings with her students. Known as the Juvenile Choir of Boston, Paul's African American students ranged from ages three to ten and sang patriotic and anti-slavery songs. The Juvenile Choir also performed at concerts and various anti-slavery events in Boston. During the two years in which they performed, Paul's choir received rave reviews, and oftentimes, the halls in which they performed were so crowded that people were denied entry. Under Paul's guidance, "The choir's singing...meant that African American voices would quite literally be heard and would prevent the anti-slavery struggle from becoming an abstract enterprise whose goals were articulated only by white reformers." By teaching her students songs about slavery, Paul was able to inform young African American children about Northern abolitionism and expand the African American anti-slavery movement.

After the Boston Female Anti-Slavery Society (BFASS) was formed as an auxiliary of NEASS, Paul became one of the first African American members of the group. Through her work with BFASS, she inspired other African Americans to join the anti-slavery movement and motivated women to join social justice movements. According to scholar Lois Brown, Paul helped to "redefine early republican notions of feminine virtue."

== Temperance ==
Paul together with Jane Putnam and Nancy Prince founded a temperance society in the 1830s. The group succeeded in having 114 African Americans take the "cold water pledge" against liquor in 1833.

== Publication ==
Paul wrote just one book: a biography entitled Memoir of James Jackson published in 1835. James Jackson was one of Paul's students at Boston's Primary School Number 6 who died at just six years of age. Her book was advertised in the abolitionist newspaper The Liberator and printed by James Loring, but the Orthodox Congregational Sabbath School Society and the Baptist Sabbath School Society would not accept her work. Unfortunately, Paul's writing career was cut short when she died of tuberculosis in 1841.

== See also ==
- List of African-American abolitionists
- Abolitionism in the United States
- African-American literature
- Boston Women's Heritage Trail
