= Jude Hall =

African-American soldier in the American Revolutionary War

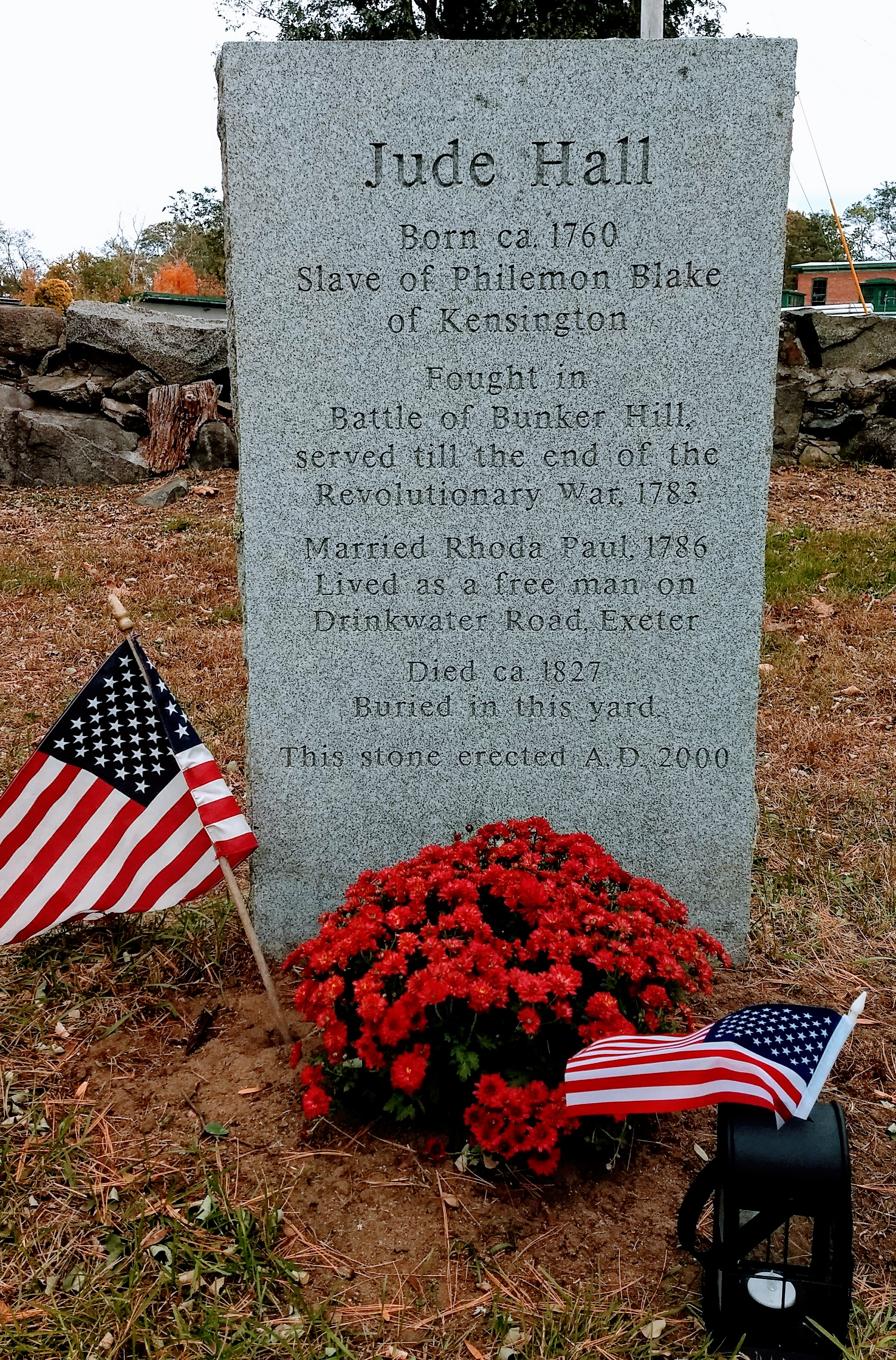
Jude Hall memorial stone

Jude (Judas) Hall was an African-American soldier in the American Revolutionary War. He served from 1775 to 1783, one of the longest serving soldiers either Black or white, and earned his freedom from slavery. After the war, he married and settled in Exeter, New Hampshire, where his homestead is still known as Jude's Pond. Three of his children were kidnapped and sold into slavery, and two of his grandsons fought in the American Civil War.

== Military service ==
Jude Hall, of Exeter, New Hampshire, enlisted in May 1775 in the 3rd New Hampshire militia regiment under General Enoch Poor, he later re-enlisted in the 2nd NH. Jude was one of the longest serving soldiers and fought in the Revolutionary War for eight years, earning his freedom from slavery. He was profiled in William C. Nell's book Colored Patriots of New Hampshire, with Sketches of Several Distinguished Colored Persons in 1855, which states: "He was a great soldier and was known in NH to the day of his death by the name Old Rock." Hall was possibly the most famous New Hampshire African-American patriot. He was one of the longest serving soldiers, either Black or white.

== Timeline ==
- May 10, 1775: Enlisted as a private in Jacob Hind's Company, 3rd New Hampshire Regiment.
- June 17, 1775: Fought at Bunker Hill, thrown by nearby cannonball.
- Nov. 1776: Re-enlisted in Clayes' Company, 2nd NH Regiment, for three years.
- 1777–1779: Saw action at Ticonderoga, Trenton, Saratoga, and Hubbardton. Was ill and recovered in Albany while his regiment continued on to Valley Forge. Fought at Battle of Monmouth, earning nickname "Rock". Served in the Sullivan-Clinton Expedition against the Iroquois on the southwestern fringes of New York state and eventually redeployed to guard the Hudson Highlands and the string of forts surrounding West Point.
  Jude Hall's signature on military papers
- December 1779: Re-enlisted again, serving in Rowell's Company, 2nd New Hampshire.
- 1782–1783: Encamped at New Windsor along with the 1st New Hampshire, forming the New Hampshire Battalion.
- 1783: Discharged and returned to Exeter, NH.

After his eight years of service, he received compensation in October 1786.

== Family life ==
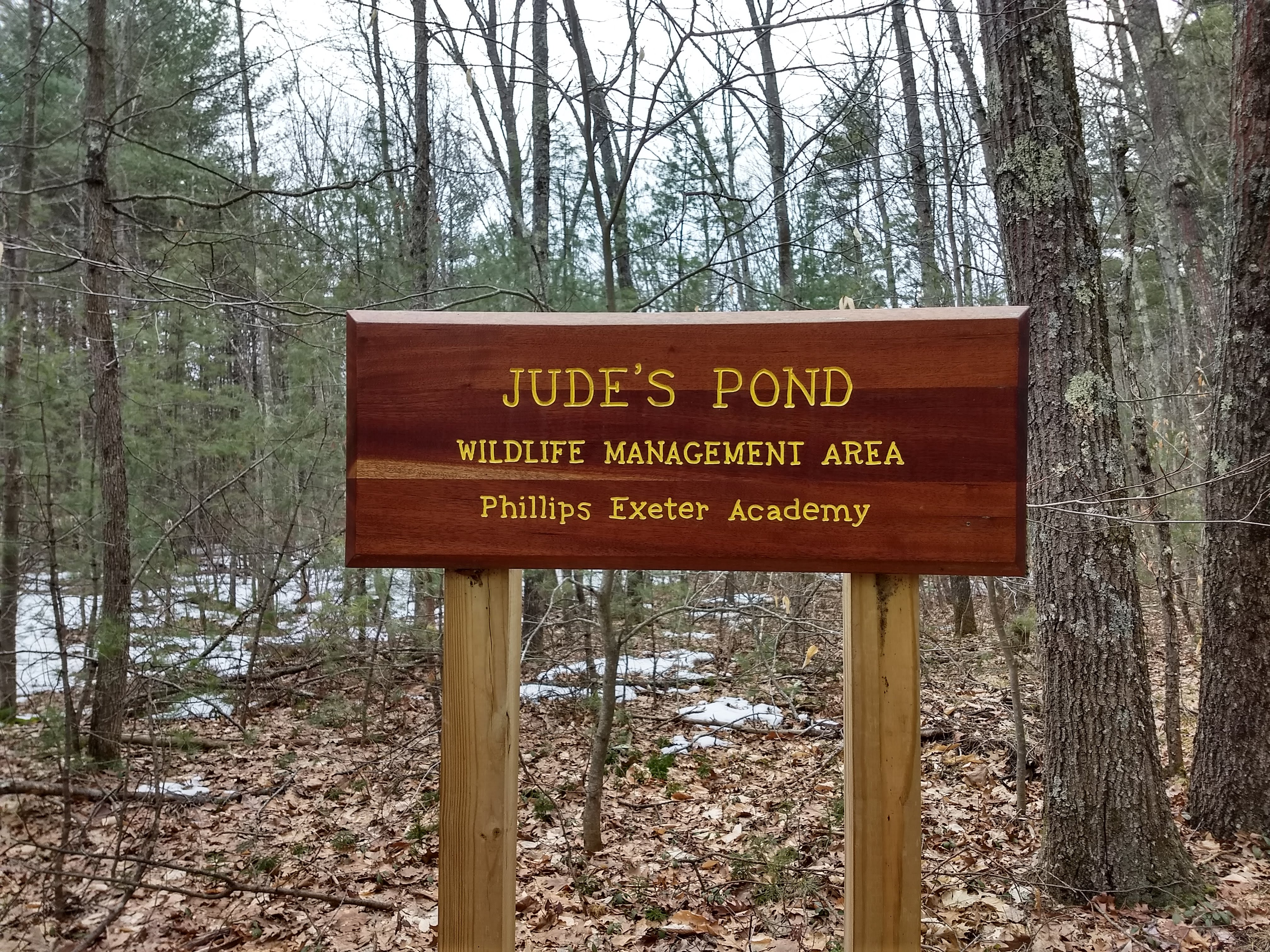
Jude's Pond sign on Drinkwater Rd, Exeter NH, near water's edge

Hall lived his entire life in the Exeter area. "Jude's Pond", located on 70 Drinkwater Road in Exeter, New Hampshire, was his homestead as a free man and still bears his name. The location is quite near to the Blake farm (now Yorkfield Stables), where he was possibly born, and was once enslaved with others. The area where Jude raised his family is still quite wooded and lonely, and the two room home no longer stands.

Jude married Rhoda (Paul), sister of Reverend Thomas Paul, in 1785 and they had a large family on Drinkwater Road. Three of their sons (James, Aaron, and William) were stolen into slavery. His eldest daughter Dorothy married Robert Roberts, butler to Massachusetts Senator Christopher Gore and author of House Servants Directory (published in 1827). Roberts gave affidavit testimony regarding 18-year-old James' abduction in 1819 from his home on Drinkwater Road by an Exeter citizen, (as described in the House Servant's Directory's 2015 edition "introduction xi" by Graham Russell Hodges). Conflicting stories show that Rhoda Hall also sent an affidavit into The Liberator Newspaper, which was printed on March 8, 1834, saying James sailed on the ship "Wallace" out of Newburyport, MA., under command of Capt. Isaac Stone. and was sold into slavery at the port of Alexandria, VA. Ship manifests show him on the "Ship Superb" sailing from Baltimore to New Orleans on April 6, 1819, to be sold by Hector McClean & Co to Dr. John Towle of Kentucky. Of their sons, only George remained to carry on the family name.

Three of Jude and Rhoda's grandsons, Moses Uriah, Aaron, and Luke Hall served in the Civil War. Moses, Jude's eldest grandson, became the first Black student to attend Phillips Exeter Academy. Jude and Rhoda's nephew was the Exeter-born abolitionist poet James Monroe Whitfield, via Rhoda's sister, Nancy Paul.

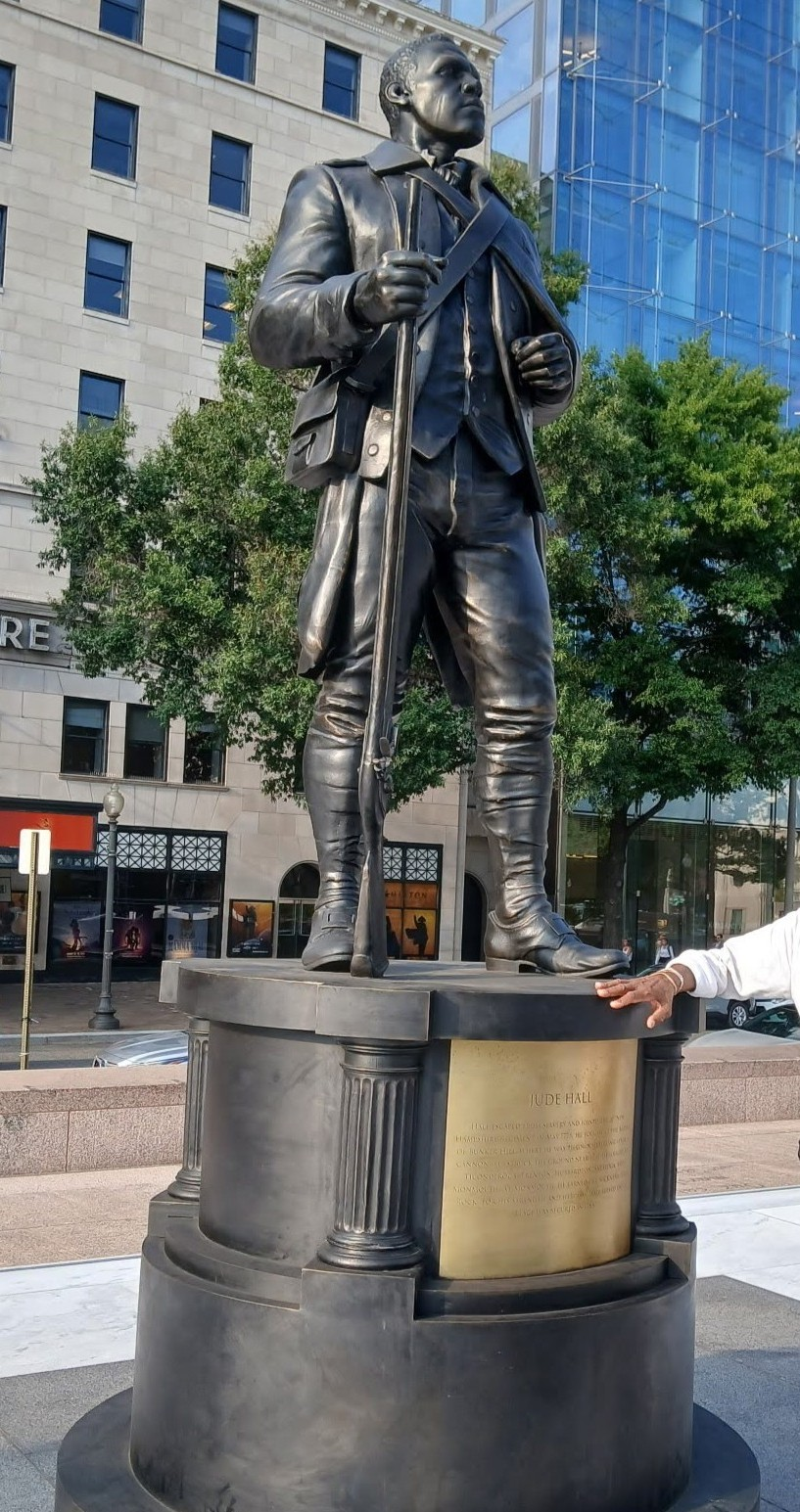
Jude Hall of 3rd NH Regiment. Statue installed June 2026 in Freedom Plaza, Washington, DC

In his history of the town of Exeter, published in 1888, Charles Henry Bell penned a memorable description of Jude Hall as "a man of powerful physique..." and also "a powerful man who could lift a barrel of cider and drink from it." According to Bell, Hall was the chief witness of the government in the trial of John Blaisdell for the 1822 homicide of another Exeter resident, John Wadleigh. Both were neighbors of Hall. Hall died in 1827, and his actual gravesite is unknown although old articles describe his grave as being in the Winter Street Cemetery "near to the old crypt." In 2000, Ed Wall, a descendant of Hall's enslaver erected a memorial stone in his honor in the Winter Street Cemetery in Exeter, in the section where other Black patriots still have stones. Widow Rhoda moved to Belfast, Maine, to live with her daughters Rhoda Ann and Mary Jane Cook. Rhoda died February 21, 1844, in Belfast, her obelisk is in the Grove Cemetery.

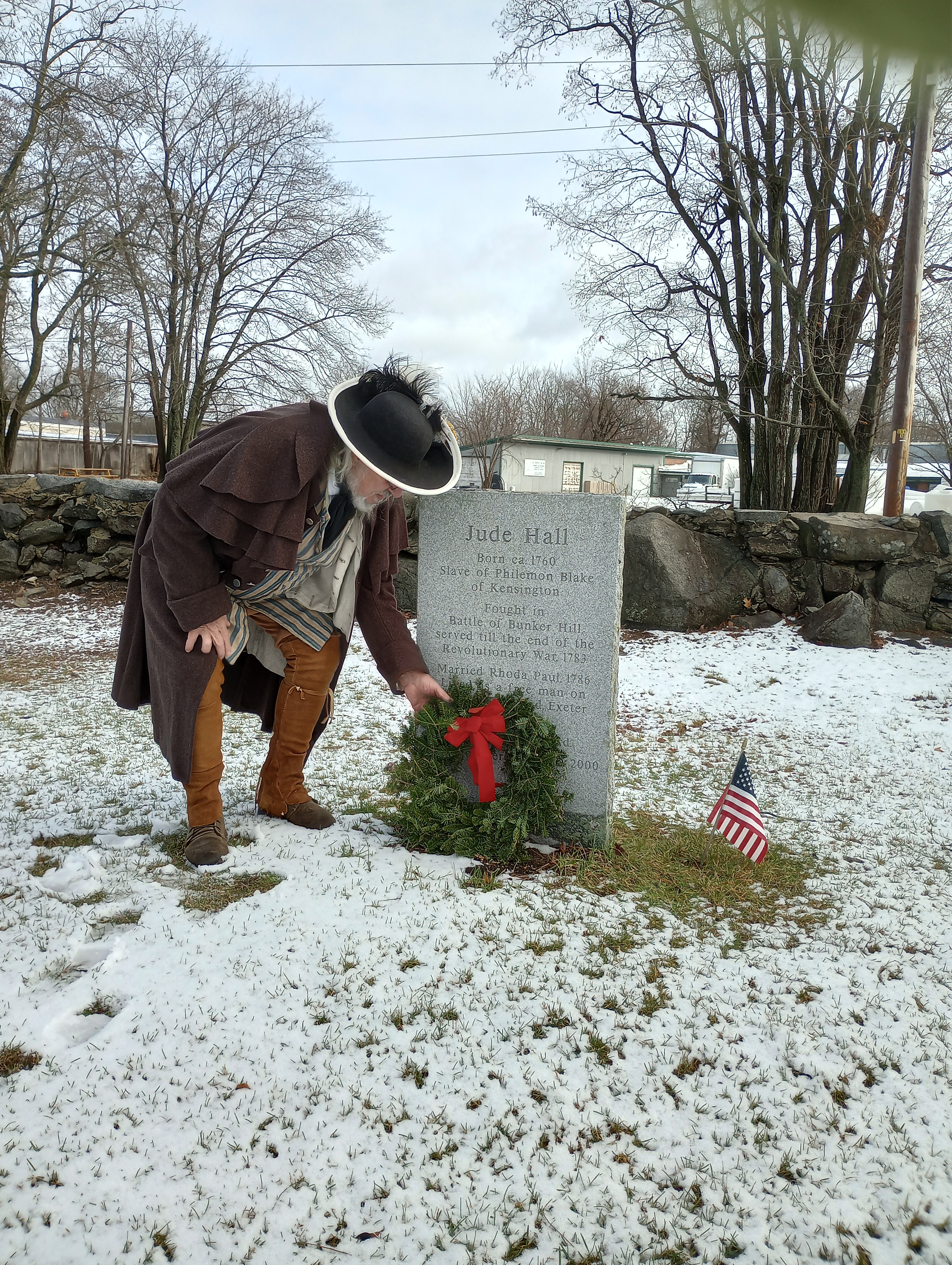
Wreath laying ceremony 2022 via the Daughters of the American Revolution, Exeter Chapter, NH

== Genealogical Society ==
In 2021, the "Jude & Rhoda Hall Society" Facebook page was created, with a downloadable tree. Descendants and researchers have the ability to interact. Updates to the tree are housed at the Exeter Historical Society.

On October 31, 2023, the Daughters of the American Revolution assigned Jude Hall an official Patriot Ancestor number (217131), through his only remaining son, George Washington Hall (b.1789). A woman in California was the first to claim Jude in her line.

In 2026, Jude Hall was included in the "10 Million Names" project of American Ancestors/NEHGS as one of 26 Black soldiers to have full family trees constructed for America 250.

== Marker Locations ==
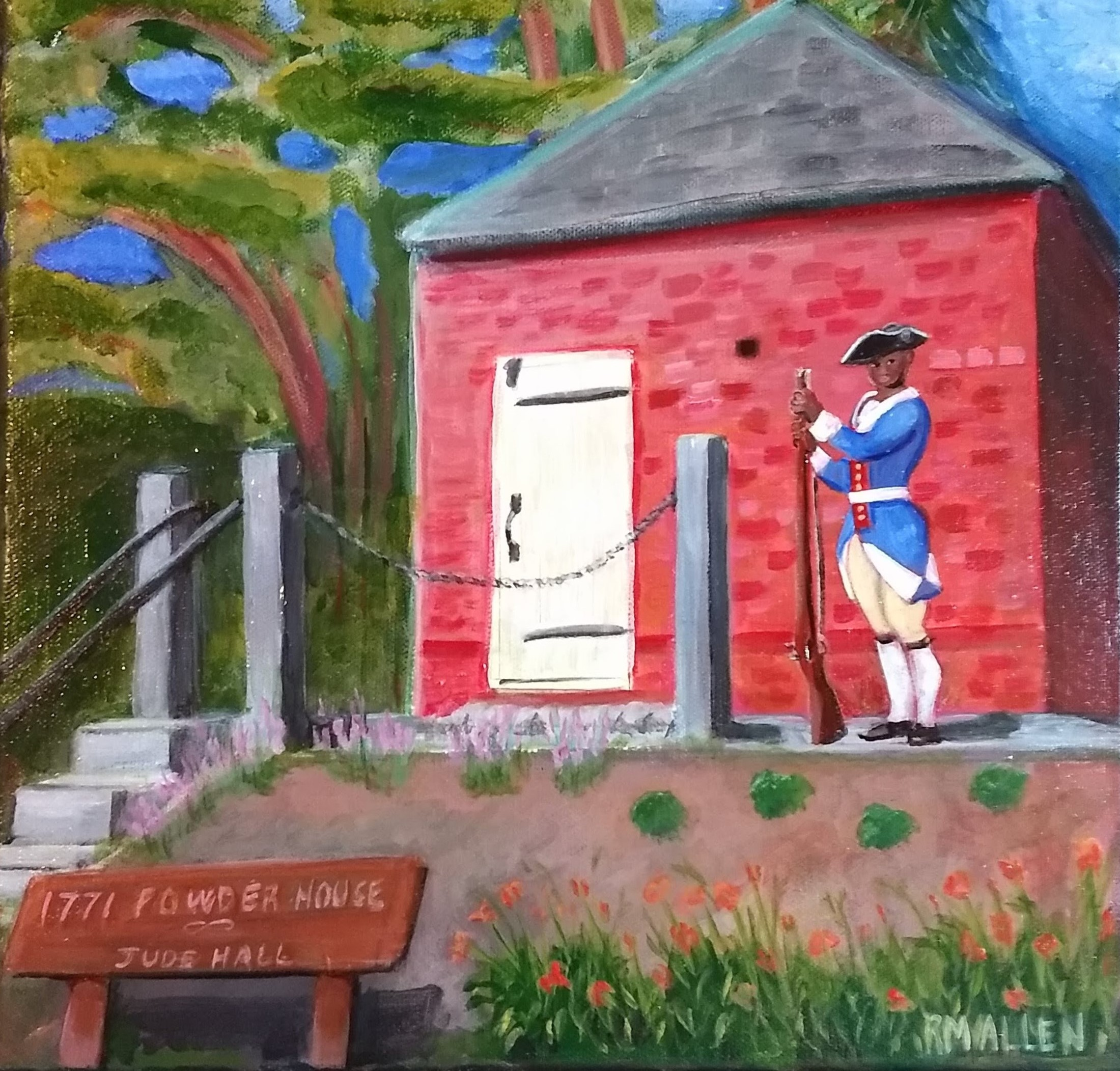
- Artwork depicting Jude Hall, owned by the American Independence Center, Exeter NH
  Memorial Stone - (erected 2000) Winter Street Cemetery, Exeter NH
- Jude's Pond trail signage - 70 (apprx) Drinkwater Road, Exeter NH
- Memorial Granite Step at the American Independence Museum, Water St., Exeter NH (on Juneteenth 2023)
- Black Heritage Trail of NH Marker - (May 4, 2024) 223 Water St. Exeter
- NHDAR "America 250!" Marker - (Nov. 2, 2024) Winter Street Cemetery/Front St. gate
- Bunker Hill Museum -educational signage (2025), Charlestown, MA.
- Bronze Statue in "12 Soldiers of the American Revolution", Freedom Plaza, Washington, DC (2026)

== Legacy ==
"America 250" commemorative poem, 2026. America, it is to thee by Durane West. Commissioned by the Exeter Literary Festival.
