= Jean-Pierre Boyer =

President of Haiti from 1818 to 1843

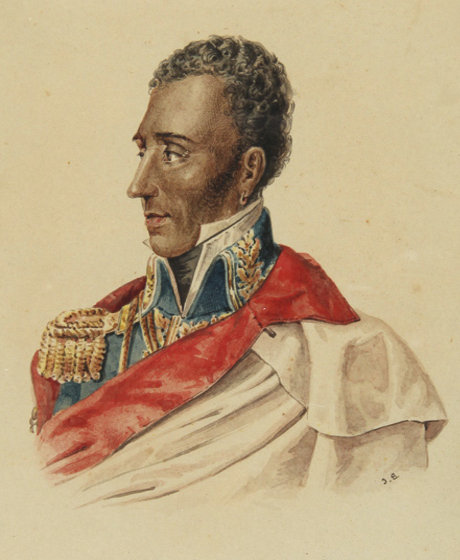
- Boyer in 1825

2nd President of Haiti
- In office 30 March 1818 – 13 February 1843
- Preceded by: Alexandre Pétion (as President); Henri Christophe (as King of Haiti)
- Succeeded by: Charles Rivière-Hérard

Personal details
- Born: 15 February 1776 Port-au-Prince, Saint-Domingue
- Died: 9 July 1850 (aged 74) Paris, France
- Spouse: Marie-Madeleine Lachenais

Military service
- Allegiance: France; Haiti
- Branch/service: French Revolutionary Army; Indigenous Army
- Years of service: 1791–1843
- Rank: General
- Battles/wars: Haitian Revolution

Jean-Pierre Boyer (French pronunciation: [ʒɑ̃ pjɛʁ bwaje]; 15 February 1776 – 9 July 1850) was a Haitian military officer and statesman. He was one of the leaders of the Haitian Revolution, and served as the president of Haiti from 1818 to 1843. He reunited the north and south of the country into the Republic of Haiti in 1820 and also annexed the newly independent Spanish Haiti (Santo Domingo), which brought all of Hispaniola under one Haitian government by 1822. Serving as president for just under 25 years, Boyer managed to rule for the longest period of time of any Haitian leader.

== Early life and education ==
Boyer was born in Port-au-Prince and was the biracial son of a French tailor and an African mother, a former slave from the Congo. He was sent to France by his father for his education. During the French Revolution, he served as a battalion commander, and fought against Toussaint Louverture in the early years of the Haitian Revolution. He later allied himself with André Rigaud, also of mulatto ancestry, in the latter's abortive insurrection against Toussaint to try to keep control of the southern region of Saint-Domingue.

== Military career ==
After the uprising of African slaves in the north of Saint-Domingue in 1791, Boyer joined with the three Republic commissioners sent in 1793 and went there to fight against the grand blancs (plantation owners) and other French royalists. In 1793, Saint-Domingue was invaded by British forces trying to capitalize on the current unrest to capture the colony. Boyer went to Jacmel, where he joined forces with mulatto leader, General André Rigaud. While other mulatto leaders surrendered to Toussaint Louverture in southern Saint-Domingue during the War of the South, Boyer escaped to France with Rigaud and Alexandre Pétion.

Boyer was on board the French privateer schooner Vengeance, when on August 3, 1800, it was captured by the United States naval cruiser USS Trumbull. Boyer was brought to New London, Connecticut, where he was nominally a prisoner, but well-treated by local Freemasons. Boyer himself was also a Freemason.

Boyer traveled to Paris, where he stayed until 1801. Napoleon was angered by Toussaint Louverture's efforts to establish total control over the colony, and France dispatched 20,000 troops to Saint-Domingue in December 1801. Boyer was part of the expedition, which arrived in February 1802. By mid-1802, Rigaud and other Black officers learned that the French intended to take away the civil rights of free people of color and re-institute slavery for former slaves in Saint-Domingue (as they had managed to do in Guadeloupe.) They sent General Leclerc to defeat the rebels, and over the next 21 months, added to his forces by 20,000 troops. Boyer joined forces with other Black rebels to defeat the French. In November 1803, France withdrew its surviving 7,000 troops, less than one-third of the forces sent to the island. Most had died as a result of yellow fever, which was endemic to the island.

After going into exile in France, Boyer and Alexandre Pétion returned in 1802 with the French troops led by General Charles Leclerc. After it became clear the French were going to try to reimpose slavery and restrictions on free gens de couleur, Boyer joined the patriots under Pétion and Jean-Jacques Dessalines, who led the colony to independence. After Pétion rose to power in the Republic of Haiti in the South, he chose Boyer as his successor. He was reportedly under the influence of his (and his predecessor's) lover, Marie-Madeleine Lachenais, who acted as his political adviser.

== State of Haiti ==
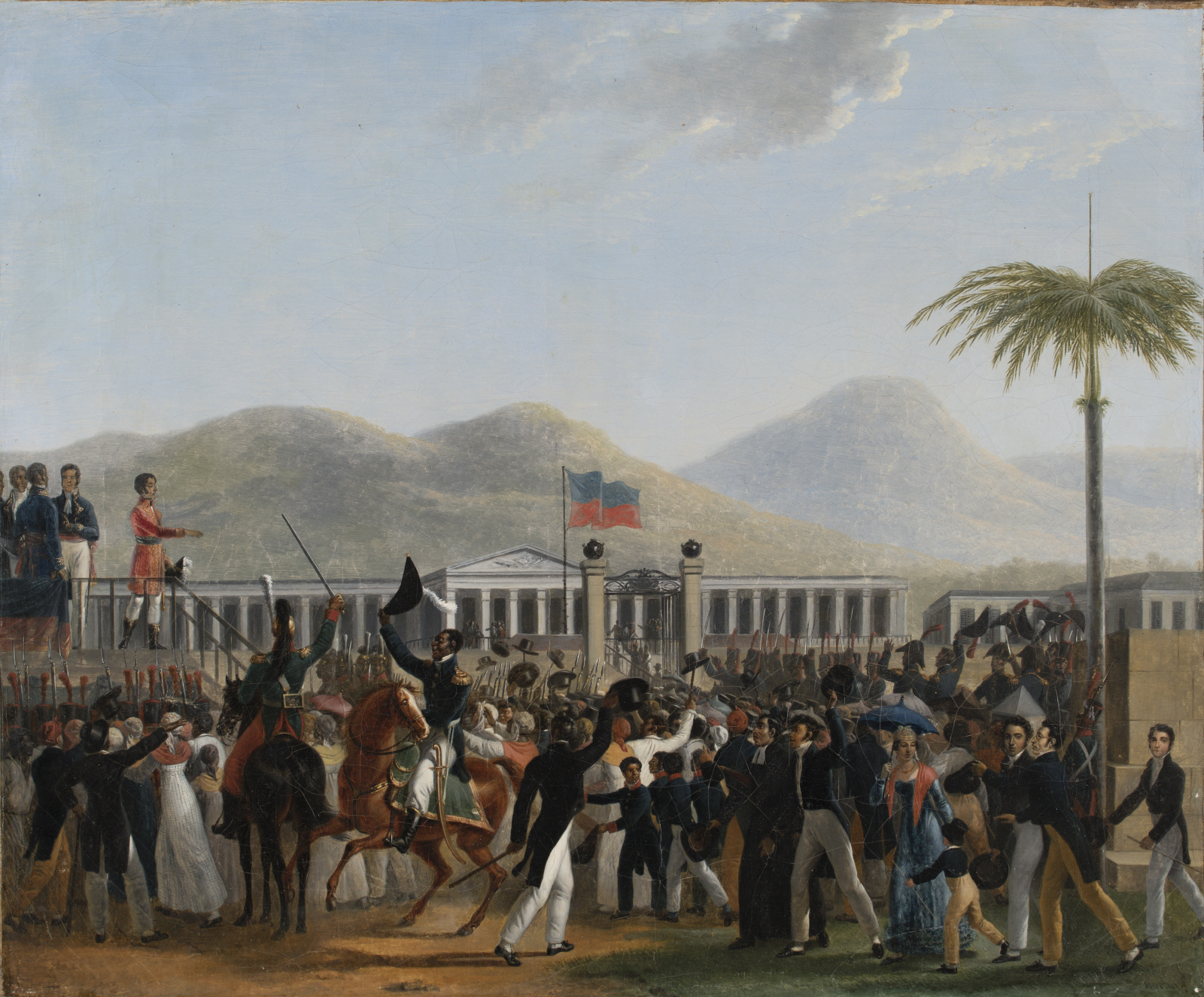
c. 1818 painting of Boyer being sworn in as president at the Palace of Haiti

Jean-Jacques Dessalines, a former slave from the North, declared Haitian independence on 1 January 1804. He established himself as Emperor Jacques I. He was assassinated by opponents in 1806. Alexandre Pétion and Henri Christophe competed to rule Haiti, and represented the split between the urban mulatto elite of the South and the black former slaves of the North, respectively. After years of warfare, they established separate states: Pétion continuing the Republic of Haiti in the southern part of Haiti, and Christophe creating the State (later Kingdom) of Haiti in the north.

In 1818 Pétion died and Boyer replaced him as the second President of the Republic of Haiti. This was an arranged transition since Pétion had selected Boyer as his successor and the Senate approved his choice. The 1816 revised constitution provided for the President to select his successor as a measure to protect the nation from foreign intrusion. Joseph Balthazar Inginac also continued as the President's secretary and right hand.

Boyer believed Haiti had to be acknowledged as an independent nation to maintain its independence, and that this could be established only by cutting a deal with France. On 11 July 1825, Boyer signed an indemnity treaty stipulating that Haiti would pay France indemnities to compensate for the lost property in slaves and trade in exchange for formal diplomatic recognition of its independence. The indemnities which continued until 1947 comprised up to 80 percent of the annual revenue of Haiti's government and severely limited the government's capacity to function and invest in infrastructure and development.

As soon as Boyer came to power, he was confronted with the continuing competition with Henri Christophe and the Kingdom of Haiti in the north. Christophe's autocratic rule created continued unrest in the Kingdom of Haiti. After his soldiers rebelled against him in 1820, in failing health and fearing assassination, Christophe committed suicide. Boyer reunited Haiti without a single battle.

== Unification of Hispaniola ==
On 30 November 1821, Jose Nunez de Caceres, president of the Spanish side of Hispaniola, declared the independence of the Spanish side of the island. The new nation was known as the Republic of Spanish Haiti. On 1 December 1821, the leaders of the new nation resolved to unite it with Gran Colombia.

Boyer sought to protect his country from the danger of France or Spain re-taking the Spanish side of the island and using it as a foothold to attack or re-conquer Haiti. He wanted to maintain Haitian independence and secure the freedom of the slaves in Santo Domingo.

After promising protection to several Dominican frontier governors and securing their allegiance, in February 1822 Boyer annexed the newly independent state with a force of 50,000 soldiers. These forces encountered little resistance from the considerably smaller Dominican population. On 9 February 1822, Boyer formally entered the capital city, Santo Domingo, where Jose Núñez de Cáceres handed over the keys to the city. Dominicans reacted uneasily to the Haitian invasion.

The island of Hispaniola was now united under one government from Cape Tiburon to Cape Samana. By awarding land to Haitian military officers at the expense of former members of the Spanish forces of Santo Domingo, Boyer reduced his influence with the Spanish-Haitian leadership. He continued the policy of Pétion, his former political mentor, of helping free blacks in other Spanish-American colonies to resist the Spanish crown. Boyer ignored Haitian political opponents who called for reforms, such as parliamentary democracy, and veteran generals of the War of Independence, who believed that the revolution was not complete and that they were being neglected. Boyer ruled the island of Hispaniola until 1843, when he lost the support of the ruling elite and was ousted.

Boyer, and his assistants, Joseph Balthazar Inginac and Jonathas Granville, were deeply involved with the massive migration of black Americans to Haiti in 1824. Yet, this event did not happen in a vacuum. Neither did the migrants respond reflexively to the promises the Haitian government offered. The migration is often called a failure because of the 6,000 (or more) migrants, a couple thousand of those emigrants returned to the U.S. However, those who stayed often had a different assessment of the migration. The term failure, then, should be applied to the prospects the Haitian government had with the migrants and the idea many white philanthropists in the U.S. had of relocating the entire black population out of the country. Neither of these two objectives were met. Yet, for the descendants of the migrants now living in the Peninsula of Samaná and those who also assimilated into the local culture, the migration gave them the opportunity to find new life on the island, and often, to interact in a wider black diaspora through commerce and industry—their knowledge of the English language gave them an edge in Haiti.

The American Colonization Society (ACS) noticed the recruitment effort. Concerned that free blacks could never assimilate to the United States, its members founded their society in 1816 to "repatriate" American blacks to Africa, regardless of where they had been born. It was an uneasy collaboration between abolitionists and slaveholders, who approached the issue from differing viewpoints. The ACS planned colonization in what became Liberia for former slaves. In 1817 Loring D. Dewey toured the East Coast to recruit emigrants, starting in New York. The organization hoped to resettle 100,000 free blacks within 10 years.

Dewey's meetings with people in New York convinced him to abandon the idea of colonizing Liberia. Most American blacks did not want to leave what they considered was fully their native country. Dewey met with Haitian citizens in New York, most of whom were refugee ethnic French and free blacks who had fled the revolution. They recommended Haiti as the ideal black homeland, due to its moderate weather conditions and independent black government. After Dewey wrote to Boyer to determine if he was still interested in receiving American immigrants, Boyer proposed that Haiti would seek blacks exclusively from the United States.

The ACS sent Boyer questions related to its goal of a colony for American free blacks. Boyer was confident that his government would be able to receive these people. The ACS tried to negotiate to have the Haitian government pay transportation costs for the emigrants. Boyer responded that the government would pay for those who could not afford it, but the ACS would have to take care of the rest of the finances. Haiti was already in debt to the French, which had exacted high payment for lost properties of planters, in essence making Haiti pay for its independence. The government did not have funds to transport American families to Haiti.

Dewey proposed establishing a colony for American free blacks that would be separate from the rest of the island, with its own laws, legislature, etc. Boyer was opposed to the idea of an American colony on the island, since the Haitians already feared re-colonization by the French. He told Dewey that the laws of the Haitian government applied to everyone across Haiti.

Beginning in September 1824, nearly 6,000 Americans, mostly free blacks, migrated to Haiti within a year, with ships departing from New York, Baltimore and Philadelphia. Due to the poverty of the island and the inability of Boyer's administration to help support the new immigrants in the transition, most returned to the United States within a short period of time.

== Payment of indemnity to France ==
Boyer was anxious to eliminate the threat from France and opened negotiations. An agreement was reached on 11 July 1825, when Boyer signed an indemnity treaty. It stated that France would recognize Haiti as an independent country in return for 150 million francs paid within five years. While this sum was later reduced to 90 million francs (in 1838), it was a crushing economic blow to Haiti.

Boyer had to negotiate a loan from France of 30 million francs to pay the first part of the indemnity. Most of the largely rural Haitian population meanwhile was retreating into an agricultural subsistence pattern. He tried to enforce the semi-feudal fermage system in order to increase agricultural productivity on the island, but the people resisted being tied to other people's lands. With the Rural Act, Boyer resurrected a land distribution program. He broke up some of the large plantations and distributed land to the small farmers. To try to produce enough products for export to generate revenue, the government "tied" the rural population to their smallholdings and established production quotas.

== Exile and death ==
Boyer's rule lasted until 1843, when the poor economic situation was worsened by the 1842 Cap-Haïtien earthquake. The disadvantaged majority rural population rose up under Charles Rivière-Hérard in late January. On 13 February 1843, Boyer fled Haiti to nearby Jamaica. He eventually settled in exile in France, where he died in Paris in 1850. Descendants of Boyer still live in Haiti.

== See also ==
- List of heads of state of Haiti

== Bibliography ==
- Boyer, Jean-Pierre and Loring Dewey, Society for Promoting the Emigration of Free Persons of Colour to Hayti (Mayday, 1824).
- Brown, Gordon S., Toussaint’s Clause: The Founding Fathers of the Haitian Revolution (Mississippi: University Press of Mississippi, 2005).
- Hazard, Samuel, Santo Domingo: Past and Present, with a Glance at Hayti, Harper & Brothers, 1873
- Leger, Jacques Nicolas, Haiti, Her History and Her Detractors (New York: The Neale Publishing Company, 1907).
- Miller, Floyd J., The Search for Black Nationality: Black Emigration and Colonization 1787–1863 (Chicago: University of Illinois Press, 1975).
- Shick, Tom. W, Contemporary Sociology 11/1/76, Vol. 5 Issue 6, pp. 798–799, 2p.
- Staudenraus, P.J., The African Colonization Movement 1816–1865 (New York: Columbia University Press, 1961).

Political offices
Preceded by Alexandre Pétion; President of Haiti	President of Haiti; 1818–43	Succeeded by Charles Rivière-Hérard; President of Haiti
