= Culture of the Dominican Republic =

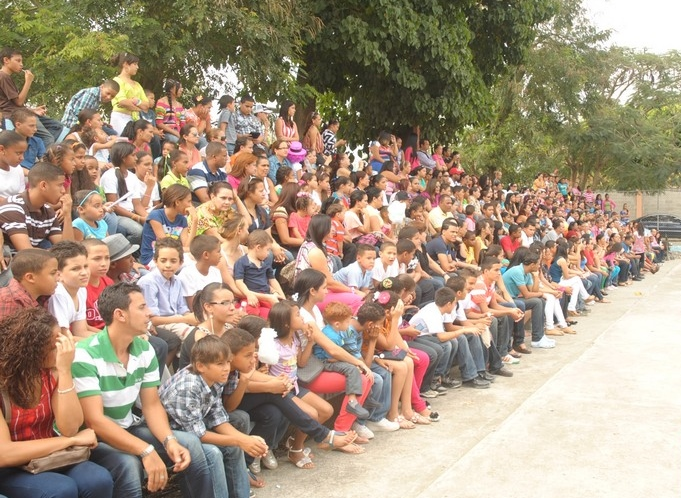
Dominican Republic people and culture.

The culture of the Dominican Republic is a diverse mixture of different influences from around the world. The Dominican people and their customs have origins consisting predominantly in a European cultural basis, with Indigenous and African influences.

The Dominican Republic was the site of the first European settlement in the Western Hemisphere, namely Santo Domingo founded in 1493. As a result of over five centuries of Spanish presence in the island, the core of Dominican culture is derived from the culture of Spain. The European inheritances include ancestry, language, traditions, law, the predominant religion and the colonial architectural styles. Soon after the arrival of Europeans, African people were imported to the island to serve as slave labor. The fusion of European, Indigenous, and African traditions and customs contributed to the development of present-day Dominican culture.

== Language ==
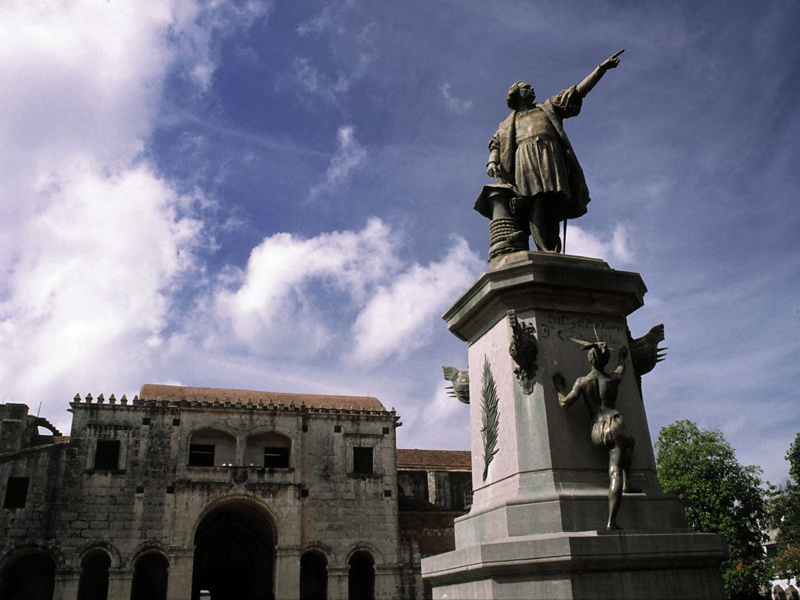
Christopher Columbus statue in colonial Santo Domingo.

Spanish is the official language in the Dominican Republic. The country has a variety of accents most of which derive from the Spanish spoken in the Canary Islands and western Andalusia of southern Spain. The accent spoken in the Cibao region is a mixture of two dialects: that of the 16th- and 17th-century Portuguese colonists in the Cibao valley, and that of the 18th-century Canarian settlers. Dominican Spanish also has borrowed vocabularies from the Arawak language. Some common words derived from the Taíno natives include: barbecue, canoe, caribbean, hammock, hurricane, iguana, manatee, mangrove, savannah, and tobacco among others.

Schools in the Dominican Republic are based on a Spanish educational model. Both English and French are taught as secondary languages on private and public schools. Haitian Creole is spoken by the population of Haitian origin and Dominicans that live in provinces close to the border.

Samaná English is a variety of the English language spoken by descendants of Black immigrants from the United States who have lived in the Samaná Peninsula, there's currently is a community of about 8,000 speakers in the Samaná Peninsula. Tourism, American pop culture, the influence of Dominican Americans, and the country's economic ties with the United States motivates other Dominicans to learn English.

== Religion ==
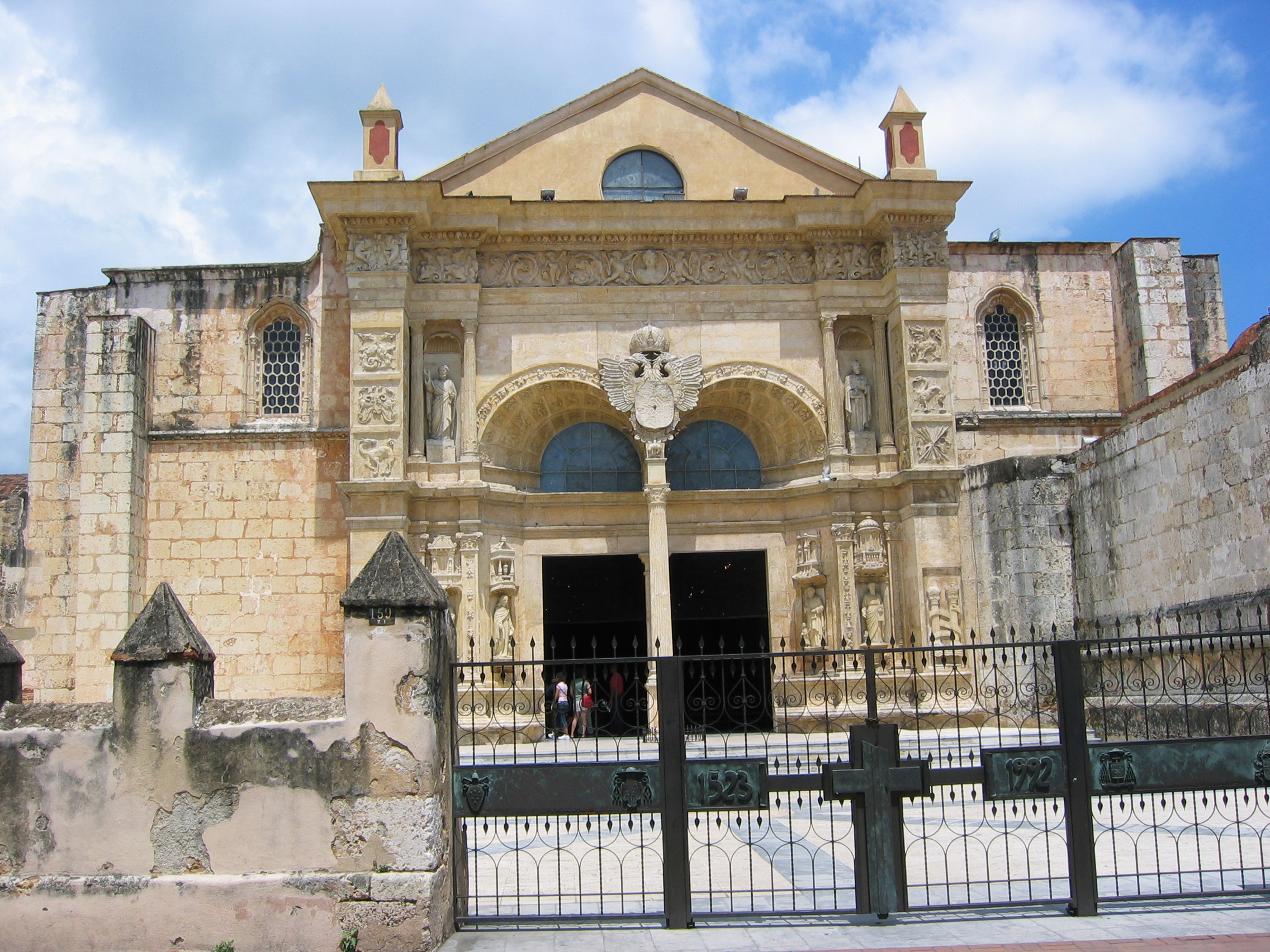
The Cathedral of Santa María la Menor, Santo Domingo, the first cathedral in the Americas, built 1512–1540.

The Dominican Republic is 68.9% Roman Catholic, 18.2% Evangelical, 10.6% with no religion, and 2.3% other. Recent immigration, as well as proselytizing, has brought other religions, with the following shares of the population: Spiritist: 2.2%, The Church of Jesus Christ of Latter-day Saints: 1.1%, Buddhist: 0.1%, Baháʼí: 0.1%, Chinese Folk Religion: 0.1%, Islam: 0.02%, Judaism: 0.01%. The nation has two patroness saints: Nuestra Señora de la Altagracia (Our Lady Of High Grace) and Nuestra Señora de las Mercedes (Our Lady Of Mercy).

The Catholic Church began to lose popularity in the late 19th century. This was due to a lack of funding, of priests, and of support programs. During the same time, the Protestant evangelical movement began to gain support. Religious tension between Catholics and Protestants in the country has been rare.

There has always been religious freedom throughout the entire country. Not until the 1950s were restrictions placed upon churches by Trujillo. Letters of protest were sent against the mass arrests of government adversaries. Trujillo began a campaign against the church and planned to arrest priests and bishops who preached against the government. This campaign ended before it was even put into place, with his assassination.

During World War II, a group of Jews escaping Nazi Germany fled to the Dominican Republic and founded the city of Sosúa. It has remained the center of the Jewish population since.

== Music ==
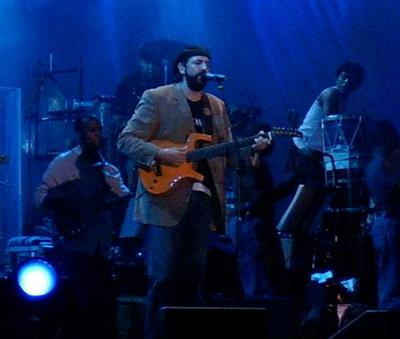
Dominican singer/songwriter Juan Luis Guerra in concert, 2005

Musically, the Dominican Republic is known for the creation of multiple musical styles and genres. The country's music culture is mostly recognized for merengue, a lively, fast-paced rhythm and dance music consisting of a tempo of about 120 to 160 beats per minute (though it varies) based on musical elements like African drums, brass, piano, chorded instruments, and traditionally the accordion, as well as some elements unique to the Dominican Republic, such as the tambora and güira. Its syncopated beats use Latin percussion, brass instruments, bass, and piano or keyboard. Between 1937 and 1950 merengue music was promoted internationally by Dominican groups like Chapuseaux and Damirón "Los Reyes del Merengue", Joseito Mateo, and others. Radio, television, and international media popularized it further. Some well-known merengue performers include Johnny Ventura, singer/songwriter Juan Luis Guerra, Fernando Villalona, Eddy Herrera, Sergio Vargas, Toño Rosario, Milly Quezada, and Chichí Peralta. Merengue became popular in the United States, mostly on the East Coast, during the 1980s and 1990s, when many Dominican artists, among them Víctor Roque y La Gran Manzana, Henry Hierro, Milly Jocelyn y Los Vecinos, residing in the U.S. (particularly New York) started performing in the Latin club scene and gained radio airplay. The emergence of bachata, along with an increase in the number of Dominicans living among other Latino groups in New York, New Jersey, Florida and Massachusetts contributed to Dominican music's overall growth in popularity.

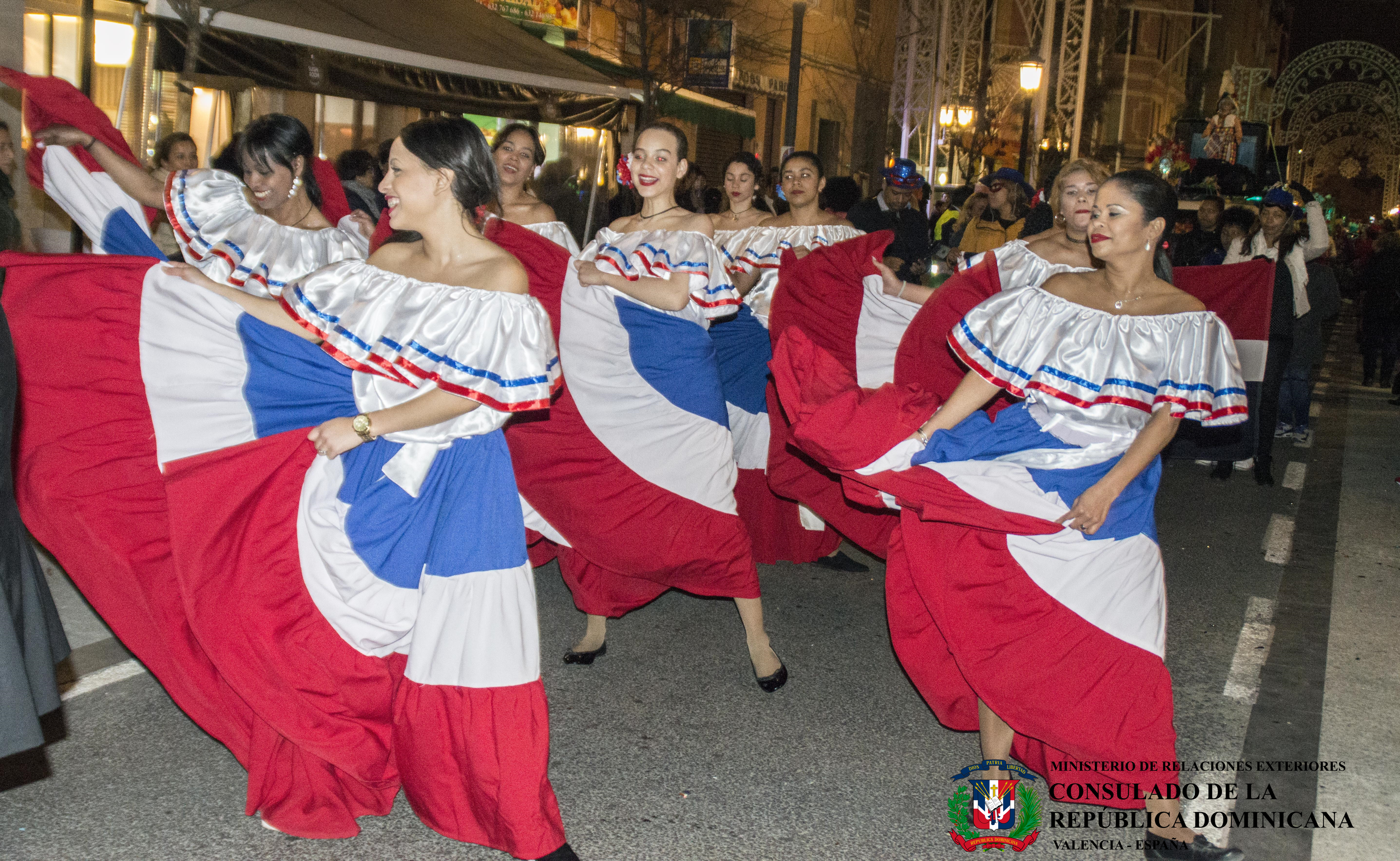
Dominican Republic dance culture.

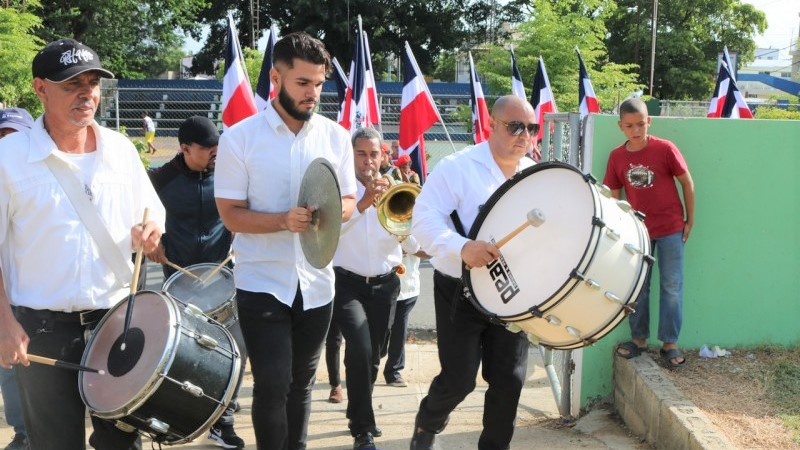
Dominican Republic music culture.

Bachata is a guitar-based genre that originated in the Dominican countryside and developed into a music style in urban Santo Domingo's shantytowns in the 1960s. The term "bachata" originally referred to informal gatherings in backyards. Early bachata drew influence from a wide range of Latin American genres, including Cuban bolero and son, Puerto Rican jíbaro music, Mexican corrido and ranchera, Colombian vals campesino and pasillo, and Dominican merengue. A typical bachata group features five instruments: the requinto (lead guitar), segunda (rhythm guitar), bass, bongos, and güira. Over time, the instrumentation has evolved, reflecting musicians' personal styles and the genre's development. Some have incorporated electric guitars, piano, saxophones, and additional percussion instruments like timbales. In the 1970s and 1980s, bachata was dismissed by the Dominican elites due to its association with rural, working-class communities, its use of sexual innuendo, and the informal musical training of many performers. However, the release of Juan Luis Guerra's Bachata Rosa album in the early 1990s propelled bachata into the mainstream, eventually surpassing merengue in both popularity and album sales. Despite this, bachata flourished and has now gained worldwide acceptance. One of the most popular bands making bachata music was the former band Aventura.

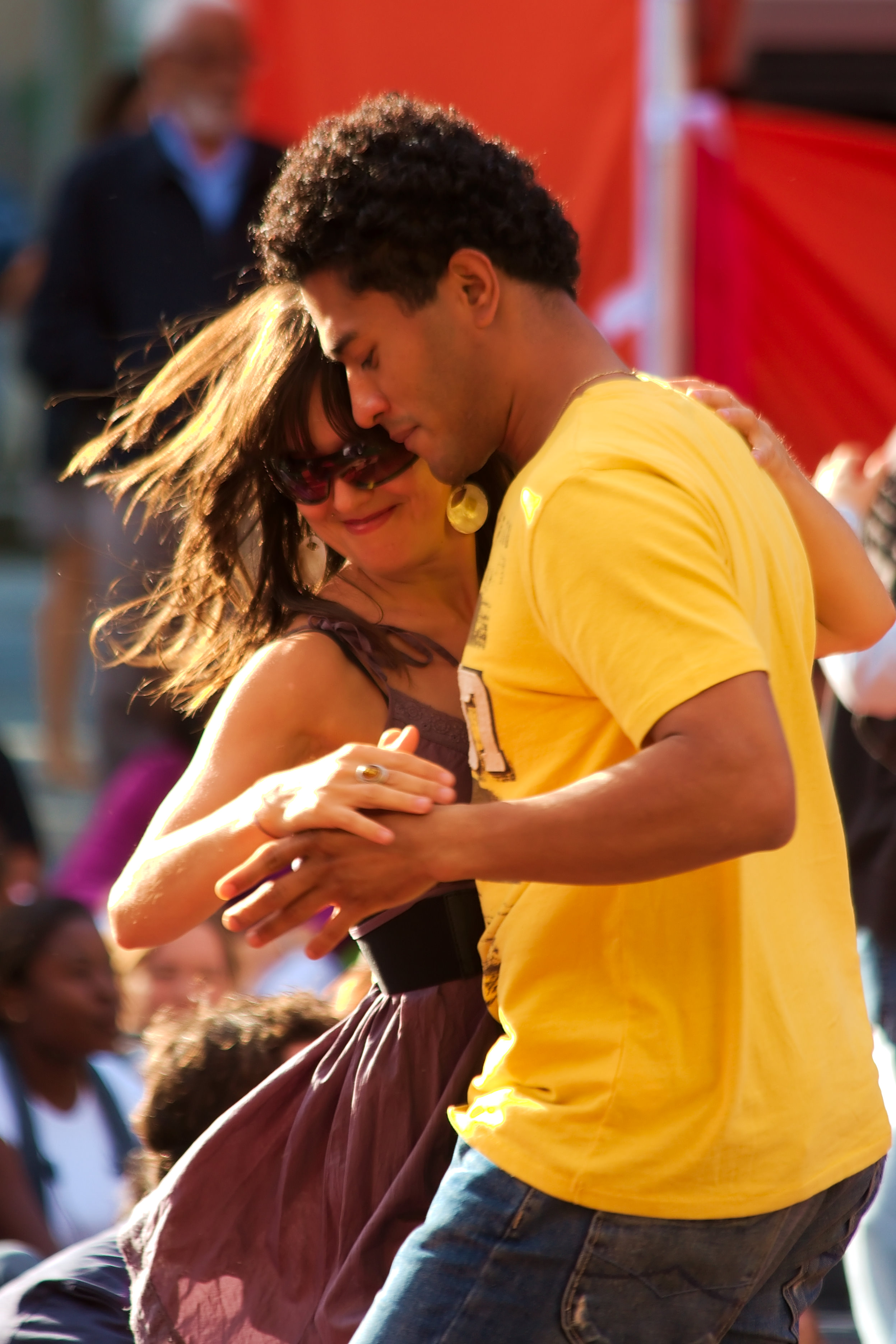
Dominican Merengue dance.

Palo is an Afro-Dominican sacred music that can be found throughout the island. The drum and human voice are the principal instruments. Palo is played at religious ceremonies - usually coinciding with feast days for saints - as well as for secular parties and special occasions. Its roots are in the Congo region of central-west Africa, but it is mixed with European influences in the melodies. Palos are related to Dominican folk Catholicism, which includes a pantheon of deities/saints (primarily known as misterios) much like those found in the African derived syncretic religious traditions of Cuba, Brazil, Haiti, and elsewhere. Palos are usually associated with the lower class, black and mixed populations.

Salsa music has had a great deal of popularity in the country. During the late 1960s Dominican native Johnny Pacheco, creator of the famed Fania All Stars, played a significant role in the music's development and popularization, and is also credited for coining the term "Salsa" to denote the genre.

Dominican rock is also popular among younger and not so younger crowds of the Dominican Republic. Dominican rock is influenced by British and American rock, but also has its own sense of unique style. The rock scene in the Dominican Republic has been very vibrant in recent years, spanning genres of rock such as pop rock, reggae/rock, and punk. There are also several underground metal concerts occurring occasionally mainly in the cities of Santo Domingo and Santiago, where teenagers and young adults usually not satisfied with the other genres express themselves. Luis Días, known as "El Terror," is widely regarded as the father of this genre. A prolific musician and composer, Días' influence extends far beyond rock, leaving a lasting impact across multiple musical styles.

== Cuisine ==
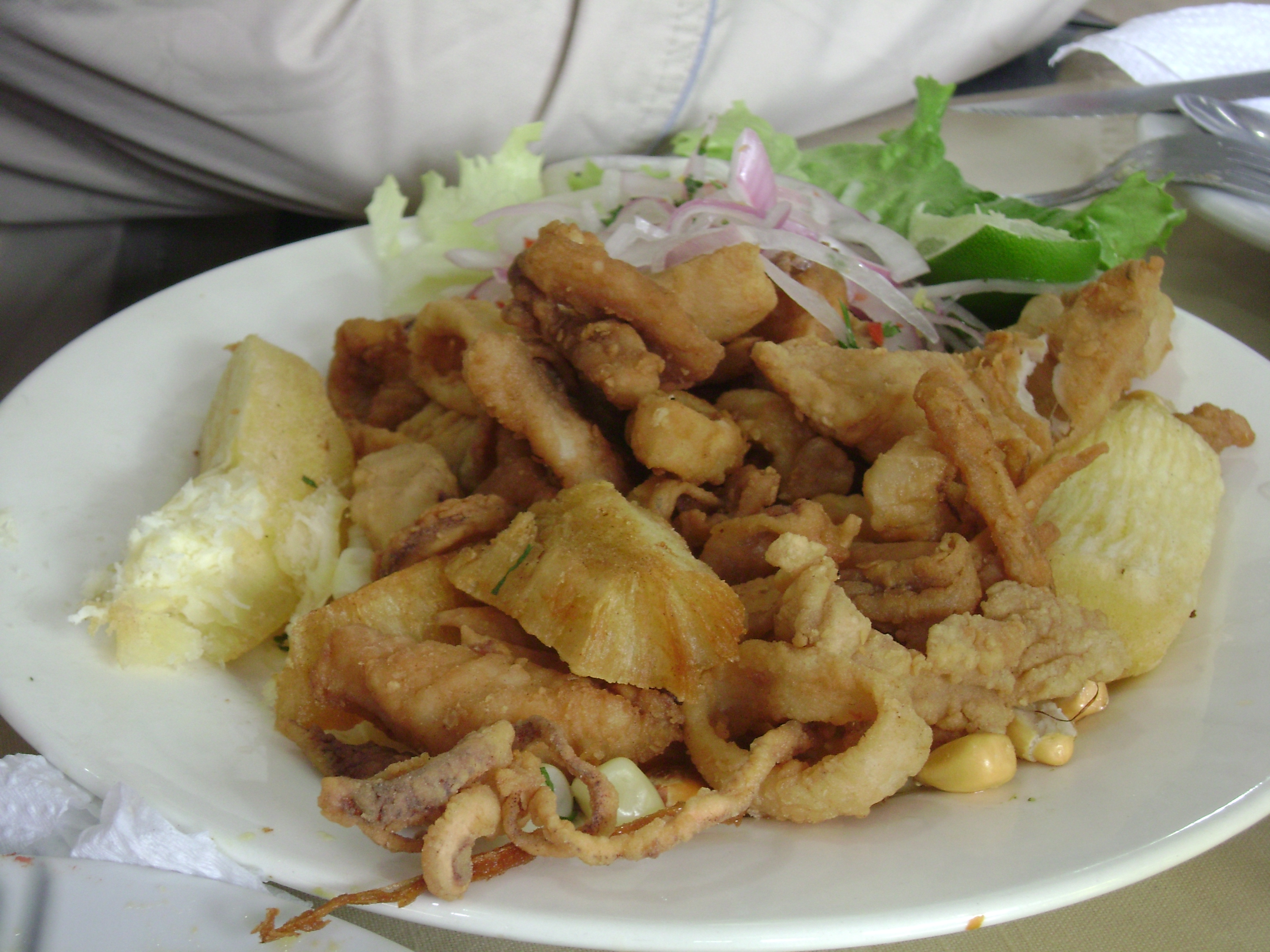
Chicharrón mixto, is a common dish in the country derived from Andalusia in southern Spain.

Dominican Republic cuisine is predominantly made up of a combination of Spanish, Indigenous, and African influences. Many Middle-Eastern dishes have been adopted into Dominican cuisine, such as the "Quipe" that comes from the Lebanese kibbeh. Dominican cuisine resembles that of other countries in Latin America, those of the nearby islands of Puerto Rico and Cuba, most of all, though the dish names differ sometimes.

A traditional breakfast would consist of mangú, sauteed onions, fried eggs, fried salami, fried cheese and sometimes avocado. This is called "Los Tres Golpes" or "The Three Hits". As in Spain, the largest, most important meal of the day is lunch. Its most typical form, nicknamed La Bandera ("The Flag"), consists of rice, red beans and meat (beef, chicken, pork, or fish), sometimes accompanied by a side of salad.

Meals tend to favor meats and starches over dairy products and vegetables. Many dishes are made with sofrito, which is a mix of local herbs used as a wet rub for meats and sautéed to bring out all of a dish's flavors. Throughout the south-central coast, bulgur, or whole wheat, is a main ingredient in quipes or tipili (bulgur salad).

Other favorite Dominican foods are chicharrón, yuca, casabe, pastelitos (empanadas), batata, yam, chaca (also called maiz caqueao/casqueado, maiz con dulce and maiz con leche), chimichurris, tostones. Some treats Dominicans enjoy are arroz con leche (or arroz con dulce), bizcocho dominicano (lit. Dominican cake), habichuelas con dulce, flan, frío frío (snow cones), dulce de leche, and caña (sugarcane). The beverages Dominicans enjoy include Morir Soñando, rum, beer, Mama Juana, batida (smoothie), jugos naturales (freshly squeezed fruit juices), mabí, and coffee.

== Sports ==
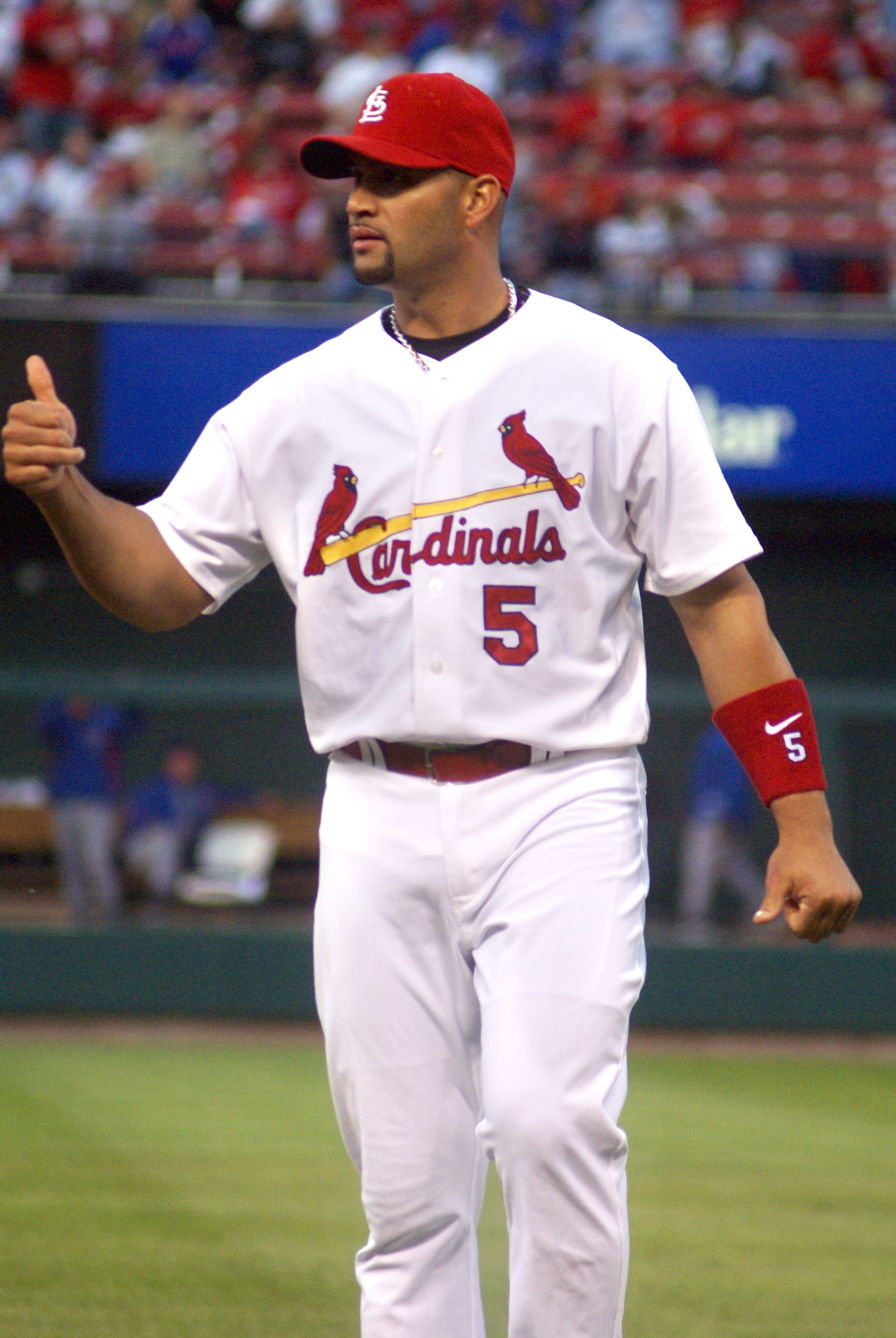
Dominican native and Major League Baseball player Albert Pujols.

Baseball is by far the most popular sport in the Dominican Republic. The country has a baseball league of six teams. The Milwaukee Brewers have a summer league here called the baseball academy. The baseball season usually begins during October and ends in January. After the United States, the Dominican Republic has the second-highest number of Major League Baseball (MLB) players. Ozzie Virgil, Sr. became the first Dominican-born player in the MLB on September 23, 1956. Juan Marichal is the first Dominican-born player in the Baseball Hall of Fame.

Some of the highest paid baseball players of all time Juan Soto, Alex Rodriguez, Albert Pujols, and Robinson Canó are of Dominican descent. Other notable baseball players from the Dominican Republic are: Julián Javier, Pedro Martínez, Francisco Liriano, Manny Ramírez, José Bautista, Hanley Ramírez, David Ortiz, Ubaldo Jiménez, José Reyes, Alcides Escobar, Plácido Polanco and Sammy Sosa. Felipe Alou has also enjoyed success as a manager, and Omar Minaya as a general manager. In 2013, the Dominican team went undefeated en route to winning the World Baseball Classic.

In boxing, the Dominican Republic has produced scores of world-class fighters and several world champions. Basketball also enjoys a relatively high level of popularity. Al Horford, Felipe Lopez, and Francisco Garcia are among the Dominican-born players currently or formerly in the National Basketball Association (NBA). Olympic gold medalist and world champion hurdler Félix Sánchez hails from the Dominican Republic, as does NFL defensive end Luis Castillo.

Other important sports include, Volleyball, which was introduced in 1916 by US Marines, is controlled by the Dominican Volleyball Federation. Other sports include taekwondo, in which Gabriel Mercedes is an Olympic silver medalist, and judo.

== Architecture ==
National pantheon in Santo Domingo.

The architecture in the Dominican Republic represents a complex blend of diverse cultures. The deep influence of the European colonists is the most evident throughout the country. Characterized by ornate designs and baroque structures, the style can best be seen in the capital city of Santo Domingo, which is home to the first cathedral, castle, monastery, and fortress in all of the Americas, located in the city's Colonial Zone, an area declared as a World Heritage Site by UNESCO. The designs carry over into the villas and buildings throughout the country. It can also be observed on buildings that contain stucco exteriors, arched doors and windows, and red tiled roofs.

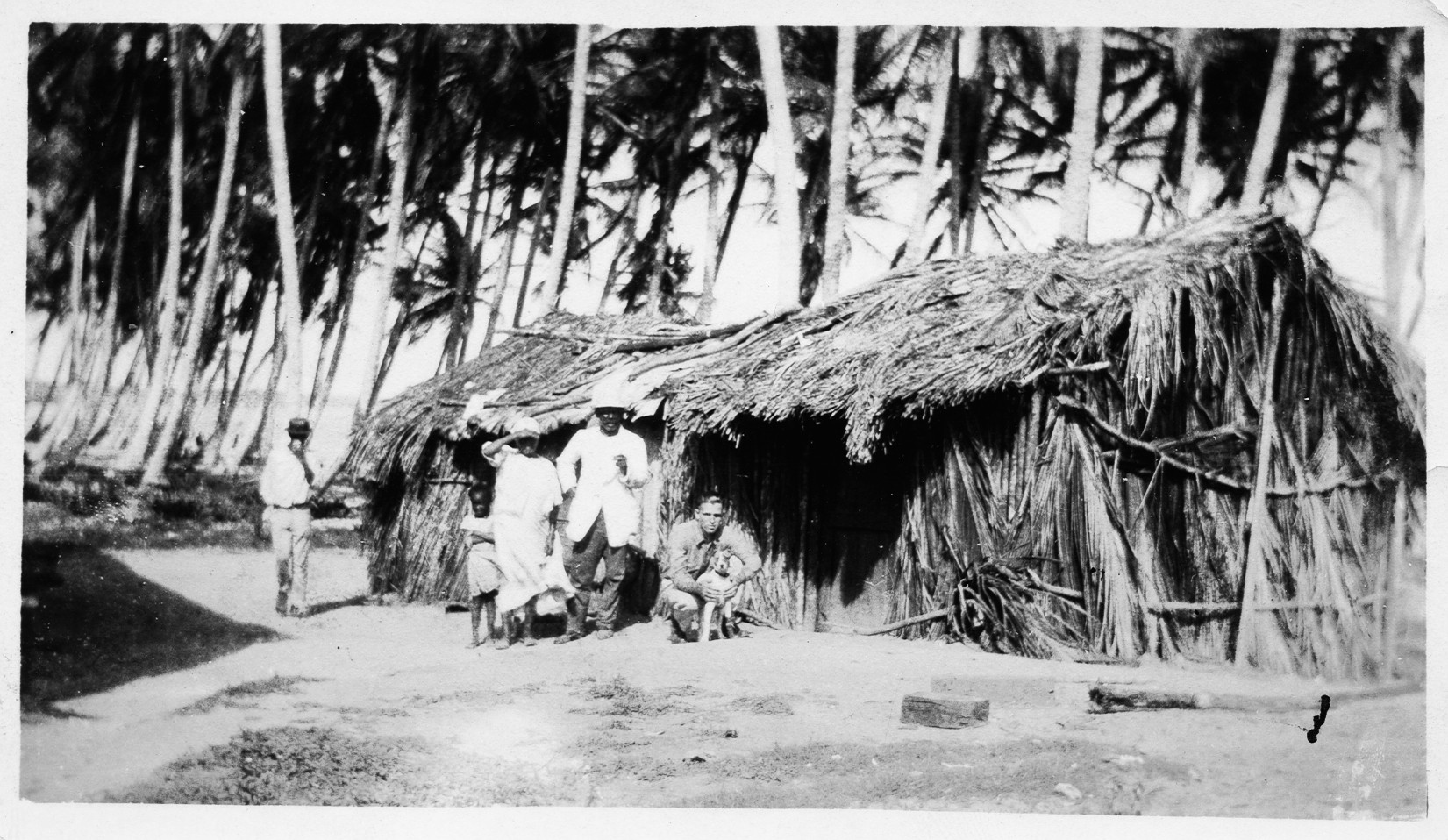
A bohío near Santo Domingo. Many Dominicans —especially those in rural areas— used to live in bohíos until well into the mid-20th century, like the Native Taínos.

The indigenous peoples of the Dominican Republic have also had a significant influence on the architecture of the country. The Taíno people relied heavily on the mahogany and guano (dried palm tree leaf) to put together crafts, artwork, furniture, and houses. Utilizing mud, thatched roofs, and mahogany trees give buildings and the furniture inside a natural look, seamlessly blending in with the island's surroundings.

Lately, with the rise in tourism and increasing popularity as a Caribbean vacation destination, architects in the Dominican Republic have now began to incorporate cutting-edge designs that emphasized luxury. In many ways an architectural playground, villas and hotels implemented new styles, while still offering new takes on the old.

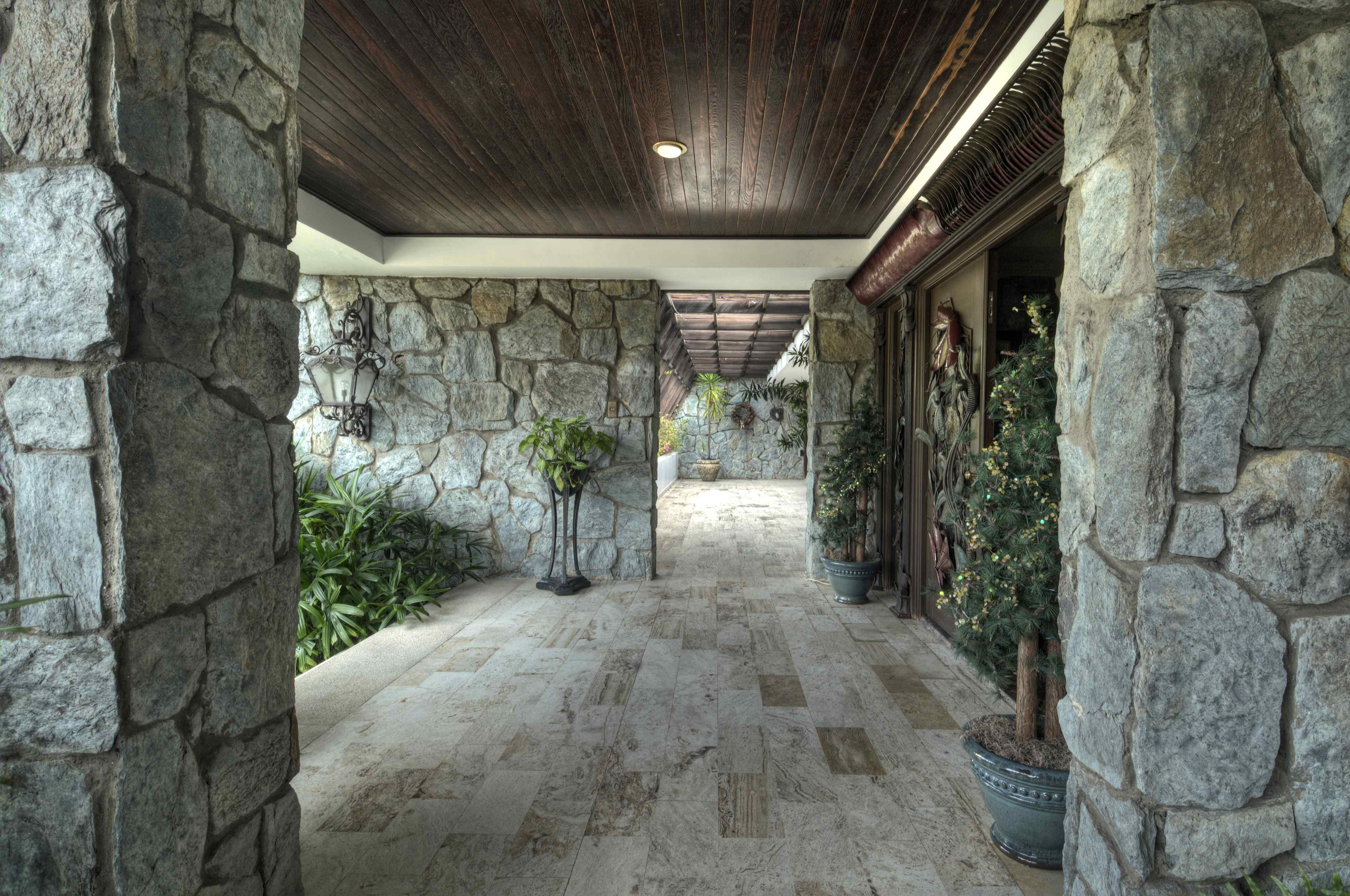
Mastrolilli residence interior by Dominican architect Rafael Calventi.

This new style, though diverse, is characterized by simplified, angular corners, and large windows that blend outdoor and indoor spaces. As with the culture as a whole, contemporary architects embrace the Dominican Republic's rich history and various cultures to create something new. Surveying modern villas, one can find any combination of the three major styles: a villa may contain angular, modernist building construction, Spanish Colonial-style arched windows, and a traditional Taíno hammock in the bedroom balcony.

== Visual arts ==
Lluvia en el mercado (English: Rain in the Market), 1942 (Museo de Arte Moderno, Santo Domingo).

Dominican art is perhaps most commonly associated with the bright, vibrant colors and images that are sold in every tourist gift shop across the country. However, the country has a long history of fine art that goes back to the middle of the 1800s when the country became independent and the beginnings of a national art scene emerged.

Historically, the painting of this time were centered around images connected to national independence, historical scenes, portraits but also landscapes and images of still life. Styles of painting ranged between neoclassicism and romanticism. Between 1920 and 1940 the art scene was influenced by styles of realism and impressionism. Dominican artists were focused on breaking from previous, academic styles in order to develop more independent and individual styles. The artists of the times were Celeste Woss y Gil (1890–1985), Jaime Colson (1901–1975), Yoryi O. Morel (1906–1979) and Darío Suro (1917–1997).

The 1940s represent an important period in Dominican art. President Rafael Leónidas Trujillo provided asylum for Spanish Civil War refugees and a group of Europeans (including famous artists) subsequently arrived to the DR. They became an inspiration to young Dominican artists who were given a more international perspective on art. The art school Escuela Nacional de Bellas Artes was founded as the first official center for teaching art. The country went through a renaissance heavily inspired by the trends happening in Europe.

Between 1950 and 1970 Dominican art expressed the social and political conditions of the time. A need for a renewal of the image language emerged and, as a result, paintings were created in non-figurative, abstract, geometric and cubistic styles. The most notable artists included Paul Giudicelli (1921–1965), Clara Ledesma (1924–1999), Gilberto Hernandez Ortega (1924–1979), Gaspar Mario Cruz (1925–2006), Luichy M. Richiez (1928–2000), Eligio Pichardo (1929–1984), Domingo Liz (b. 1931), Silvano Lora (1934–2003), Cándido Bidó (1936–2011) and José Ramírez Conde (1940–1987).

During the 1970s and 1980s artists were experimenting again with new styles, forms, concepts and themes. Artists such as Ada Balcácer (1930–2025), Fernando Peña Defilló (b. 1928) and Ramón Oviedo (b. 1927) count as the most influential of the decade.

== Cinema ==
Dominican cinema is an emerging film industry, being one of the first countries in Latin America where the Lumière brothers first brought the Curiel theater in San Felipe de Puerto Plata at the beginning of the century in the year 1900, with the industry's beginnings dating back to 1915 in which the first film is produced in Dominican territory.

The Dominican Film Market is officially the first film market in the history of the Caribbean Region, DFM was created and produced by filmmakers Roddy Pérez and Nurgul Shayakhmetova, executives of Audiovisual Dominicana. In its first edition, DFM had the support of important international brands such as Panasonic, Nikon and Blackmagic Design, as well as the co-sponsorship of the Directorate General of Cinema DGCINE, the Center for Export and Investment of the Dominican Republic CEI-RD and the Ministry of Tourism of the Dominican Republic.

== Fashion ==
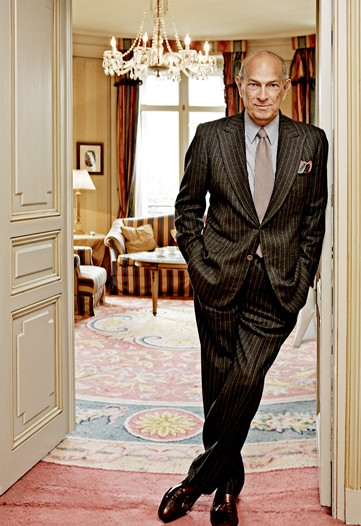
Dominican native, fashion designer and perfume maker Oscar de la Renta

In only seven years, the Dominican Republic's fashion week has become an important fashion event in the Caribbean and one of the fastest growing fashion events in the Latin American fashion world. The country boasts one of the ten most important design schools in the region, La Escuela de Diseño de Altos de Chavón.

World-famous fashion designer Oscar de la Renta was born in the Dominican Republic in 1932 and became a US citizen in 1971. He studied under the leading Spaniard designer Cristóbal Balenciaga and then worked with the house of Lanvin in Paris. Then by 1963, de la Renta had designs carrying his own label. After establishing himself in the US, de la Renta opened boutiques across the country. His work blends French and Spaniard fashion with American styles.

Although he settled in New York, de la Renta also marketed his work in Latin America where it became very popular. He remained active in his native Dominican Republic, where his charitable activities and personal achievements earned him the Juan Pablo Duarte Order of Merit and the Order of Cristóbal Colón.

Fashion designer Jenny Polanco was known for women's clothing and handbags that incorporated Dominican and Caribbean influences into her designs.

== Festivals ==
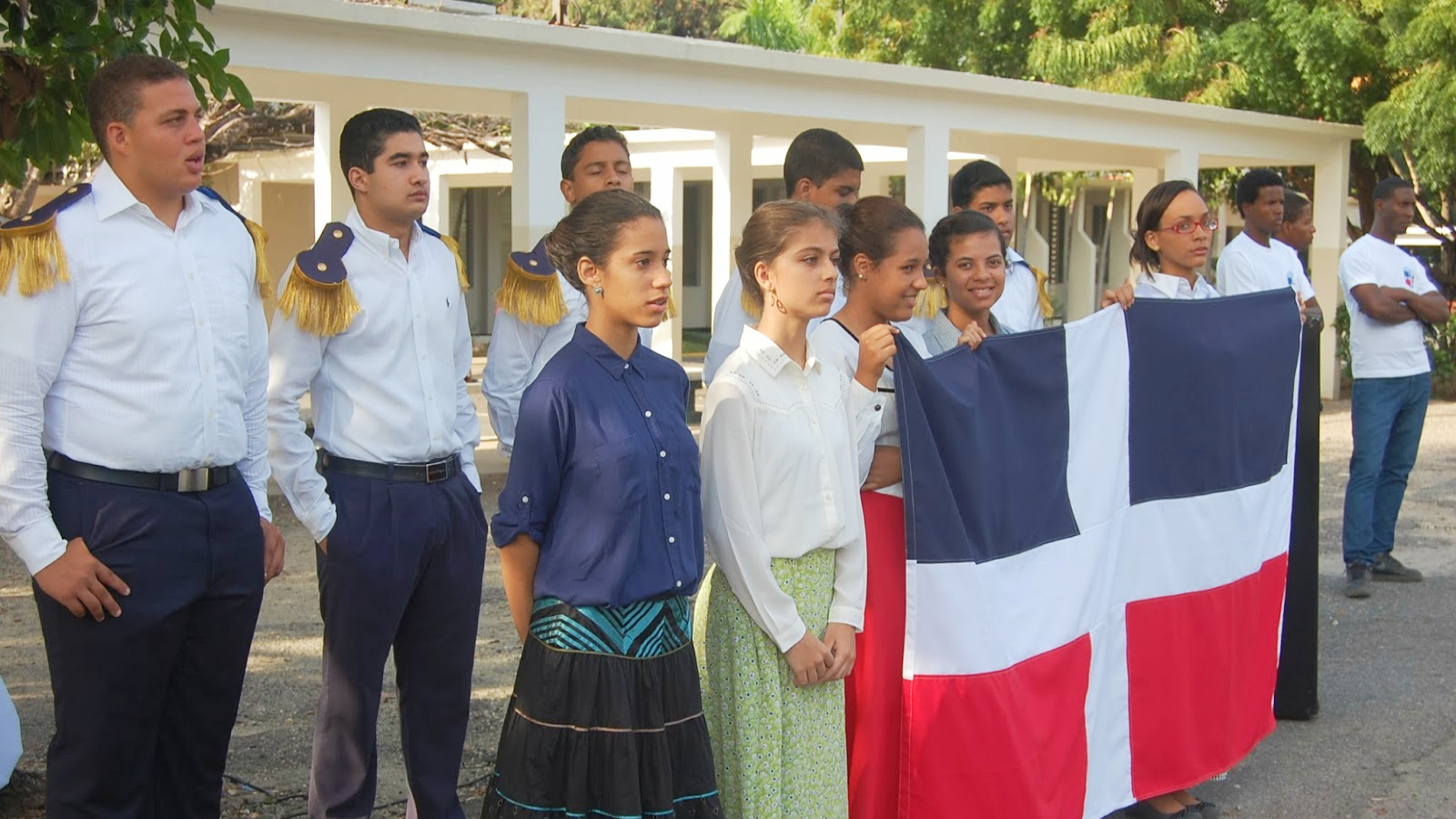
Dominican Republic students with historical national flag.

Carnival celebrations are held in the Dominican Republic each February with parades, street dancing, food festivals, and music. Festivities also take place in the week leading up to Easter Sunday. Parades, beauty pageants, and different festivals in each town throughout the country fill the week. In June the country celebrates Espíritu Santo to honor the island's multi-ethnic heritage with nationwide festivals featuring traditional music.

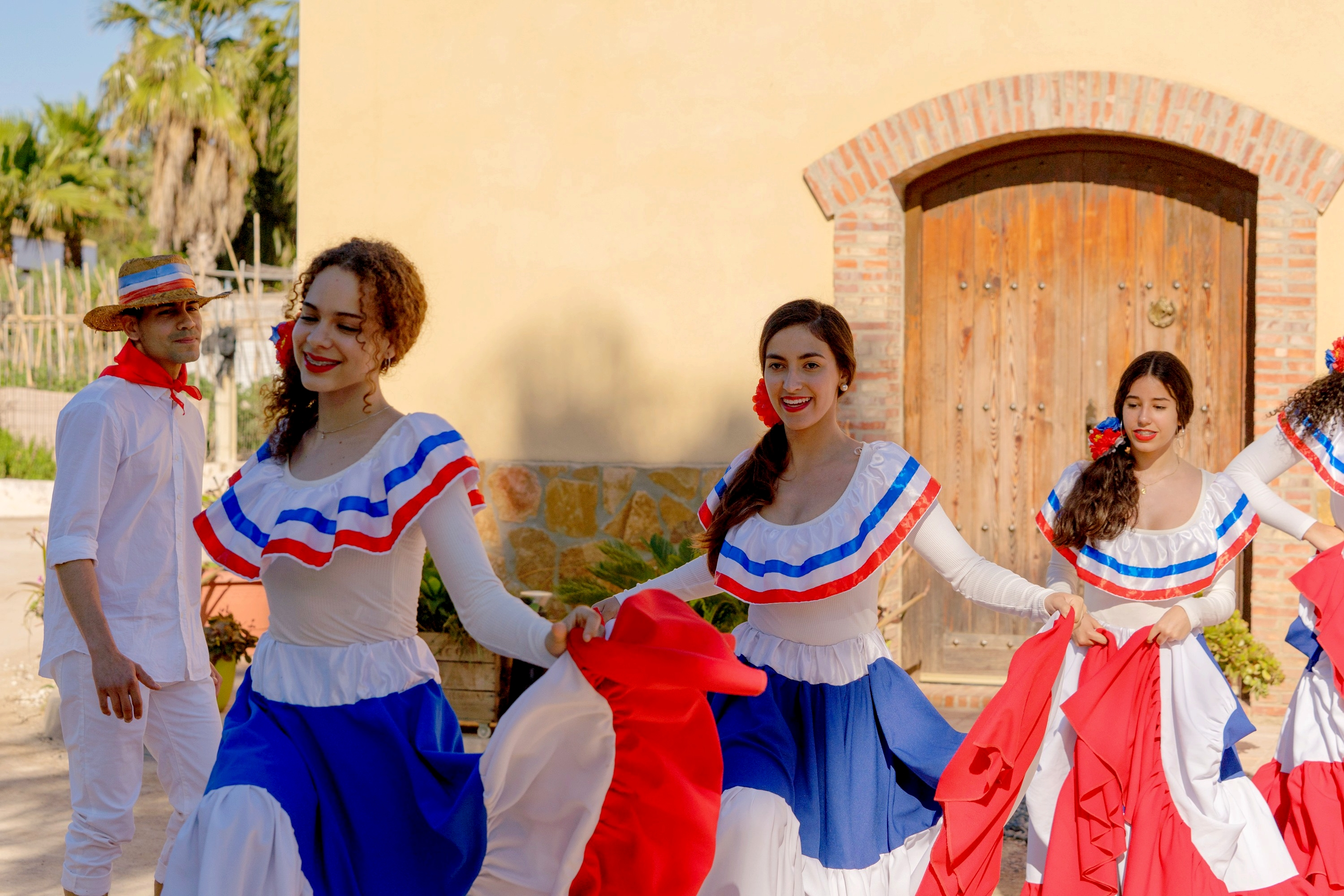
Dominican Republic people in traditional culture dress.

Concerts, dance troupes, arts and crafts booths, and chefs also celebrate Dominican heritage with an annual cultural festival in Puerto Plata each June. Fiesta Patria de la Restauración, or Restoration Day, celebrates the Dominican Republic's day of independence from Spain, which occurred in 1863. Nationwide events include parades, music festivals, street festivals, and food festivals.

Three days each June are set aside for the Latin Music Festival in Santo Domingo. Both local and international Latin musicians and bands take the stage. During the last week of July and first week of August Santo Domingo hosts some of the world's top merengue bands at the Festival del Merengue. Other events during the two-week-long party include and food festival and an arts and crafts festival.

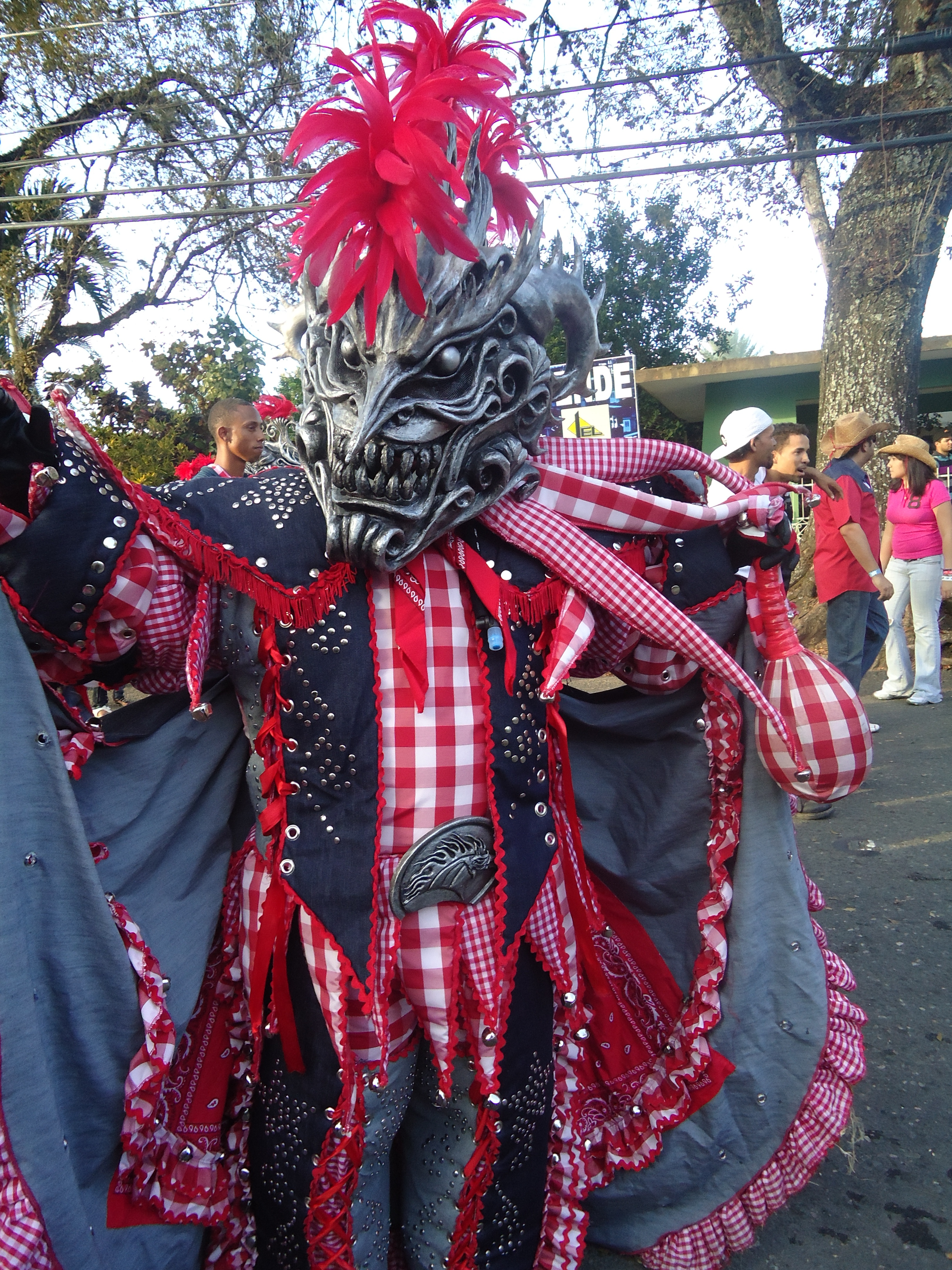
Traditional cojuelo mask of the Dominican carnaval

The merengue festival takes place in July in both Santo Domingo and Puerto Plata. This week-long bacchanal raises the ''merengue'' and the costumes worn by the dancers to an art form. The dancers dance in the street and on open stages and compete for an array of honors that recognize originality, fluidity, and beauty of the choreography. Posters that are designed to advertise the festival compete for originality and beauty. The crowds who come to watch the dancing and the parades that take place in the evening also dance.

October's Puerto Plata Festival brings musicians from around the country together to perform live music in a variety of genres. Blues, jazz, folk, salsa, and merengue are the most common. Another musical event takes place in October during Columbus Day Weekend: the Dominican Republic Jazz Festival. Concerts are held in Puerto Plata, Sosua, and Cabarete, and feature some of the country's top jazz musicians and bands.

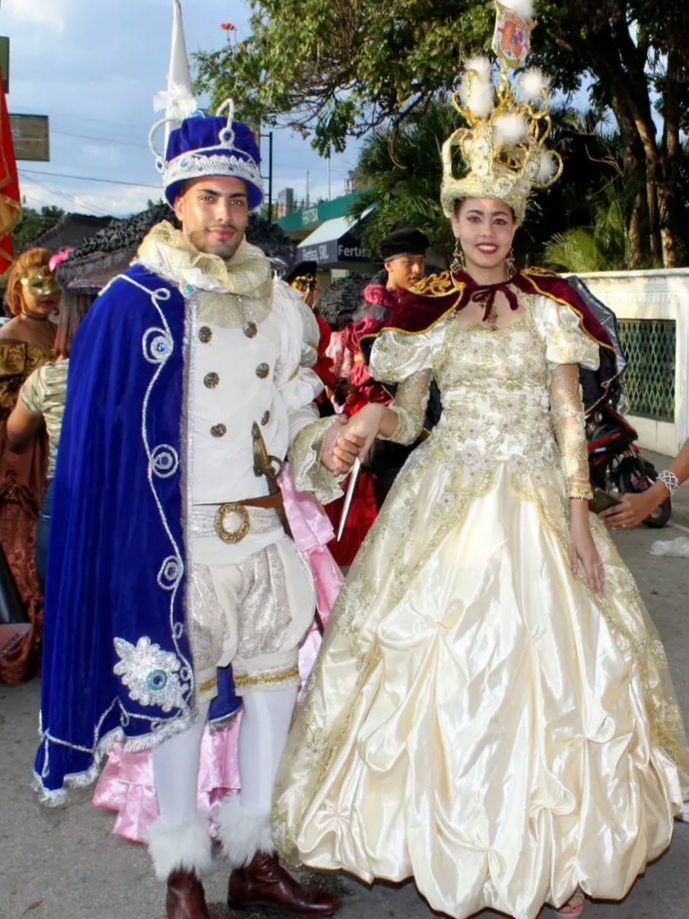
Dominican Republic carnival parade costumes in San Juan de la Maguana

Other festivals include the Festivales del Santo Cristo de Bayaguana on New Year's Day. Events leading up to Mass include a parade, music, and dance. Each January the Dominican Republic honors Juan Pablo Duarte with gun salutes in Santo Domingo and numerous carnivals throughout the country. Duarte is celebrated as the man who gained independence from Haiti for the Dominican Republic. The premier culinary event in all of the Caribbean is Taste SD, which takes place in October of each year.

During the event, hundreds of restaurants, food vendors, chefs, and others on the culinary scene host a series of presentations, tastings, and more. The event stretches out over several days and venues and is known to attract several thousand guests. The main event, unveiled in 2012, is the Culinary Cup of the Americas in which chefs participate in several cooking and baking events hoping to win the top prize. Another event is the Dominican Republic International Film Festival. During four days each December, independent films, shorts, and documentaries are screened.

== Holidays ==
Date	Name	
January 1	New Year's Day	Non-working day.
January 6	Catholic day of the Epiphany	Movable.
January 21	Día de la Altagracia	Non-working day. Patroness Day (Catholic).
January 26	Duarte's Day	Movable. Founding Father.
February 27	Independence Day	Non-working day. National Day.
(Variable date)	Holy Week	Working days, except Good Friday. A Catholic holiday.
May 1	International Workers' Day	Movable.
May 25	Mother's Day	
(Variable date)	Catholic Corpus Christi	Non-working day. A Thursday in May or June (60 days after Easter Sunday).
August 16	Restoration Day	Non-working day.
September 24	Virgen de las Mercedes	Non-working day. A Patroness Day (Catholic)
November 6	Constitution Day	Movable.
December 25	Christmas Day	Non-working day.

Notes:

- Non-working holidays are not moved to another day.
- If a movable holiday falls on Saturday, Sunday or Monday then it is not moved to another day. If it falls on Tuesday or Wednesday, the holiday is moved to the previous Monday. If it falls on Thursday or Friday, the holiday is moved to the next Monday.
- Roman Catholic religious holidays are not moved to another day.

== See also ==
- Conchoprimo
- Dominican Republic literature
- Dominican art
- List of museums in the Dominican Republic
- Dominican people
- White Dominicans
- Afro-Dominicans
- Demographics of the Dominican Republic
- Dominican Carnival
- Latin American culture
