= Main page (disambiguation) =

Main Page or main page may also refer to:

- Home page, the main web page of a website
- Personal web page, a web page created by an individual with content of a personal nature

== See also ==
- William Main Page (1869–1940), British lawyer and Esperantist
- Front page (disambiguation)
- Home page (disambiguation)
- New Page (disambiguation)
- Page (disambiguation)
- Main (disambiguation)
- All pages with titles containing "main" and "page"
