= Chico Gonzalez =

Dominican Republic writer (born 1945)

- Born: Francisco Antonio Gonzalez Silverio; 29 October 1945 Santiago de los Caballeros, Santiago, Dominican Republic
- Occupation: Poet, writer and reciter
- Genre: Sociopolitical
- Years active: 1960s-1997

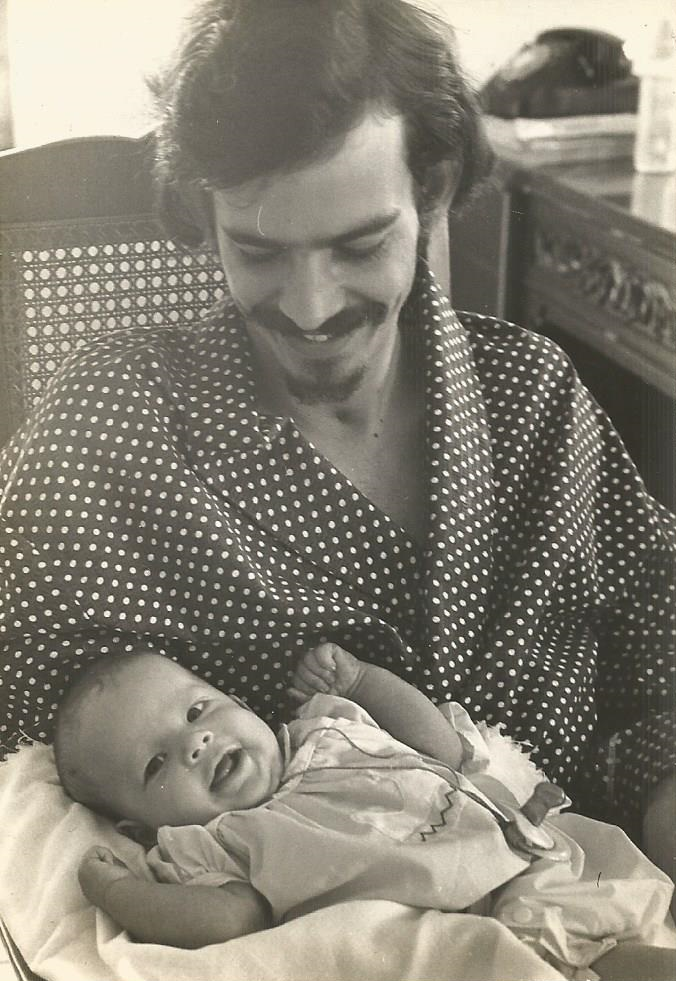
Gonzales with his niece in the 1970s

Francisco "Chico" Antonio Gonzalez Silverio (born 29 October 1945) is a political poet and writer who organised and took part in protests during “The Twelve Years” of Joaquín Balaguer presidency.

His most famous song is "Francisco Alberto, Caramba…".

== Expresion Joven ==
The group was established in Santo Domingo in 1972, sponsored by the Dominican sociologist Cholo Brenes . The poet Gonzalez, singers Manuel de Jesus, Ramon Leonardo and Puro Eduardo López, formed the political folk group. Also Rafael Ramon Castro as a substitute for Leonardo.

Once formed as a group, they performed for a year and a half, in presentations around the country. These functions were performed under the sponsorship of the local clubs and associations of students in a very difficult environment, given the conditions of strong political repression caused by the government of Joaquin Balaguer in its so-called period of "The Twelve Years". Presentations were made in Canada, Puerto Rico and especially in New York City, a city with a strong representation of the Dominican diaspora .

In mid- 1973 Expression Joven embraced the cause of solidarity with political prisoners, which at that time abounded in Dominican prisons. Under those circumstances, they recorded the song "Mr. Government, open the gates". All members of the group got arrested several times by the police forces of Balaguer regime.

In 1974, Cholo Brenes and Expression Joven assumed the artistic direction of the festival "Siete Dias con el Pueblo (Seven Days With the People)", held between 25 November and 1 December. The event was attended by numerous figures of Latin America and Spain protest songwriters. The group performed for 7 days and their interpretation of the song "Obrero Acepta mi Mano", by the composer Luis Dias, became the anthem of a Festival which resulted in a protest against the government.

The group disbanded in 1975.

== Discography ==
- La Hora Esta Llegando(1974)
- Obrero Acepta Mi Mano(1975)

== Health problems and disappearance ==
In March 1974, he had a cerebral aneurysm. He had a full recovery, but in August 1975 he had the second one. After the second aneurysm he did not have a full recovery.

On 5 October 1997, he disappeared. An extensive search was done for several months, but he was never found.

== Bibliography ==
While cultivated singing and songwriting of social commitment, Chico Gonzalez dabbled in writing poetry and sociopolitical short stories, leaving the publications:

- Con Cuba (1981) (With Cuba) - Short stories and poems
- Delirios de un Naufrago (1986) (Delusions of a castaway) – Poems
