= Dominican rock =

Dominican contributions to rock music

Dominican rock (or rock dominicano) is rock music created by musicians in the Dominican Republic. It was introduced to the country in the 1960s by the musician Milton Peláez. The genre became more popular years later with the start of Luis Dias' band Transporte Urbano, successful bands such as Tribu Del Sol, Toque Profundo and Tabu Tek began to emerge. Dominican rock is listened to by the youth of the Dominican Republic who have embraced the music, sometimes over merengue and bachata. Rita Indiana y los Misterios are a musical group known for their blend of traditional merengue music with rock.

== Subgenres of Dominican rock ==
The styles of rock bands from the Dominican Republic differ greatly. Not only is there regular Spanish pop rock, there are also subgenres such as alternative, punk, and metal. Most songs are sung in Spanish, though some bands (like ALF, Mithril, and 42-01 for instance) also sing in English. The band ALF is considered the pioneers of Emo Punk in the Dominican Republic.

== Live ==
Although the rock scene stays local and rarely goes international, it is large within the Dominican Republic, especially in the nation's capital, Santo Domingo. Several bands as 'JLS (Spain), Transporte Urbano (U.S.A & Cuba) Sister Madness (Canada), ALF (USA), Pericles (USA, Costa Rica), Dark Miracle (USA), Cevix (Santo Domingo/USA), Los Pérex (USA, Mexico, Puerto Rico, Costa Rica, Panama) La Armada (USA, Puerto Rico, Mexico), Bocatabú (USA, Puerto Rico), Futuros Divorciados (USA, Puerto Rico, Costa Rica, Panamá), Dronk (USA) and Santuario (Puerto Rico) have traveled to other countries to play. Many concerts are held in the indoor auditorium of the Domínico Americano, a local school. Bands of many different genres of Dominican rock play there. Some artists who have played there are "spam", González, Sociedad Tabú, Shido, TKR, Toque Profundo, Cronicas del Eco, and Nux. Within the punk scene, there are a few venues which are regularly used for concerts. One of the most popular venues was Donde L'Abuela, a house which is regularly volunteered for concerts, as well as a small bar called Stilo Club, where bands such as Los Pérex, La Reforma, La Armada, Pericles, Shido and Mulligan have played. Nowadays, there are venues like Shots Bar, Cinema Café, Casa de teatro, Hard Rock Café Santo Domingo, Hard Rock Café Punta Cana which serves as the actual rock scene.

== Awards and music videos ==
The Premios Cassandra (now referred to as Premios Soberano), an award ceremony, is held yearly. There have also been many successful music videos in production. The most popular and considered best video is "Suele Pasar" by La Siembra, directed by Tabare Blanchard, who also directed "Pa´ Que No Pienses" by Calor Urbano. Dominican rock videos are played on many local music channels, and are also played in some other South American countries.

== See also ==
- Rock en español
- Dronk
