= Congos of Villa Mella =

Religious brotherhood of the Dominican Republic

The Congos of Villa Mella is a religious brotherhood of the Holy Spirit founded in the 16th century by enslaved Africans and mestizos in what is now the Dominican Republic. It is deeply rooted in the history, geography and culture of the country and of the community of Mata Los Indios, Villa Mella.

== Legend ==
According to Dominican folklorist, Fradique Lizardo, and several informants from the community of Villa Mella, the legend of the Brotherhood of the Congos of the Holy Spirit says that some time ago (there is no specific date when), some people who were looking for a place to found their town, met the Holy Spirit lying on a Copey trunk . He had a white dove in his hand in an attitude of flying and at his feet were several musical instruments (congo mayor, congo menor or conguito, canoíta and a maraca). The Holy Spirit indicated that with those instruments they would play in his honor and He himself taught the dance steps. He also ordered that the brothers of this society could play and dance at candlelight vigils and other religious festivals that are offered to him, as long as He was present.

== Main function ==
The main function of the brotherhood is to celebrate the feasts of the Virgin of the Rosary (October 7) and the Holy Spirit (Pentecost Sunday), as well as the performance of funeral ceremonies for the deceased who in one way or another are linked to the tradition of the Congos. 21 "toques" are dedicated to these deceased with their characteristic instruments which are the Congo, Conguito, maracas and canoes (canoíta). In addition, the brotherhood coordinates and participates in community, social and festive events, within and outside their community of origin.

Some of its most recognized members were Sixto Minier and Pío Brasobán, who were Captain and King of the Congos respectively.

== Musical characteristics ==
The Villa Mella Congos have a strong African influence, especially from the Congo-Angolan region and the former Dahomey.

The typical percussion instruments of the Villa Mella Congos are: a congo or palo mayor, a conguito or palo menor (also called Alcahuete), a canoíta and several maracas. The first two instruments are drums. The canoíta is made up of two small sticks, one of which is hollowed out, in the shape of a canoe, and the other acts as a percussion stick.

Congos are often performed at religious and secular celebrations, maintaining characteristics of African sung music such as the alternation, in responsorial form, of a choir and a soloist.

== UNESCO recognition ==
In 2001, UNESCO recognized the Brotherhood of the Congos of the Holy Spirit as a Masterpiece of the Oral and Intangible Heritage of Humanity and in 2008, due to a new convention held by UNESCO, the cultural space of the Brotherhood of the Holy Spirit of the Congos of Villa Mella became part of the Representative List of the Intangible Cultural Heritage of Humanity.

== See also ==
- Afro-Dominicans
- Palo music
- Sixto Minier
