= Juan Francisco Ordóñez =

Dominican musician (born 1961)

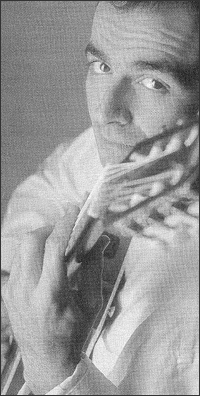

Background information
- Born: Juan Francisco Ordóñez; 4 October 1961; Santo Domingo, Dominican Republic
- Genres: Bachata, son
- Occupations: Musician, composer
- Instrument: Guitar
- Years active: 1980–2009

Juan Francisco Ordóñez (born 4 October 1961) is a guitarist from Santo Domingo, Dominican Republic. His music combines blues, rock, and jazz.

== Career ==
Ordóñez graduated high school from Colegio Dominicano De la Salle and later earned a degree in economics from the Universidad Autónoma de Santo Domingo. He began his guitar studies with Blas Carrasco and later continued on his own. He learned formal music composition from Sonia de Piña at the Dominican National Conservatory. From 1976 to 1977, he took part in the folk group Convite.

In the early 1980s, he and Luis Días formed the rock group Transporte Urbano. Ordóñez was Transporte Urbano's lead guitarist for almost 25 years. In 1985, Ordóñez traveled to Moscow in the old U.S.S.R., performing several concerts with Patricia Pereira and Luís Días.

Ordóñez started the band OFS with Transporte Urbano drummer Guy Frómeta and Transporte Urbano bassist Héctor Santana. In 1986 they traveled to Peru with Dominican singer Sonia Silvestre to perform at the Festival de la Nueva Canción Latinoamericana. In the 1990s, he started the Caribbean fusion trio Trilogia with Héctor Santana and percussionist Chichí Peralta

He is music director for La Vellonera, a band which accompanies Dominican singer Víctor Víctor.

== Professional work ==
Ordóñez has also led a solo career and has worked as an arranger and director of commercial jingles, music for films (as in the short Frente al Mar about a story of the Dominican writer Hilma Contreras, and Leon Ichaso's Bitter Sugar.)

Ordoñez has been a popular sideman for musicians in the Dominican Republic, Latin America, and Spain. He has participated in jam sessions with Don Cherry, Paquito D'Rivera, and Charlie Haden.

== Discography ==
- Trilogía (Tercer Mundo, 1988)
- Cabaret Azul (1989)
- Radio Recuerdo (Madora Foundation, 2001)
