= Sixto Minier =

Dominican folklorist and spiritual leader (1920–2008)

- Born: March 28, 1920; Villa Mella, Dominican Republic
- Died: April 29, 2008 (aged 88); Villa Mella, Dominican Republic

Sixto Minier (March 28, 1920 – April 29, 2008) was a folklorist in the Dominican Republic. He is recognized for his leadership of the group "Los Congos de Villa Mella," a longstanding spiritual brotherhood or "cofradia" in the Dominican Republic whose practices belong to the complex of Caribbean cultural expressions of the African diaspora. "Los Congos de Villa Mella" were named to the UNESCO list of Intangible Cultural Heritage in 2001. Minier was honored by the city of New York "for his contribution to preserving African heritage in the Dominican Republic" (2001). The Dominican Government recognized him as "living heritage of Dominican folklore."

== Other awards and recognition ==
In 1999, the Bayahonda Cultural Foundation conferred upon Minier the title of "Dominican Folklore Mentor." The last major recognition he received prior to his death was in 2008, during the 11th International Book Fair in Santo Domingo, Dominican Republic, "for his role in guaranteeing the continuation of the knowledge, processes, and traditional artistic techniques of the Dominican Republic."

== Death ==
Minier died at the age of 88 (although some say he was older), from complications brought on by prostate cancer and kidney problems. Upon his death, he was widely considered a national treasure in the Dominican Republic for his contributions to the nation's art and folklore. Minier learned the traditions and practices of Los Congos de Villa Mella from his mother. Together with another Los Congos member, Pío Brazoban, from the 1960s forward Minier taught over 50 other congregants living in Mata Los Indios, a community in the northern outskirts of Santo Domingo that to this day lacks many basic services, and whose inhabitants often grapple with socioeconomic concerns.

== Bibliography ==
Hernández Soto, Carlos. Morir en Villa Mella: Ritos funerarios Afrodominicanos. Santo Domingo: Centro Para La Investigación y Acción Social en el Caribe, 1996.
