= Home page (disambiguation) =

A home page is the main web page of a website.

Home Page or home page may also refer to:

- The start page shown in a web browser when the application first opens.
- A web server directory index
- Personal web page, a web page (or a whole site) created by an individual with content of a personal nature
- Home Page (film), a 1999 documentary on weblogs
- Home Page (TV series), a Canadian television show
- IBM Home Page Reader, a computer program
- Women's page of a newspaper

== See also ==
- Front page (disambiguation)
- Main page (disambiguation)
