= Tabú Tek =

- Tabu Tek, led by Maximo Martinez upfront in 2009

Background information
- Origin: Santo Domingo, Dominican Republic
- Genres: Dominican rock, rock en español, electronica, alternative rock, electronic rock
- Years active: 1995–2002
- Label: Independent
- Past members: Maximo Martinez; Tomas Alvarez; Franklin Betances; Javier Vargas; Alberto Dujarric; Jacinto Alberto Mendez

Tabú Tek sometimes spelled Tabutek, or even TABU-TEK, was an alternative electronic rock band based in Santo Domingo, Dominican Republic.

The band formed in the mid 1990s with a short but productive career and released three albums in their native Dominican Republic. The band enjoyed local success in the Santo Domingo rock scene and released music videos like "El Precio" which enjoyed rotation in MTV. While enjoying success in their native country, the band was never able to push for international success. Sintetik, the band's last album, represented the band's maturation and professionalism but never made it out of the local scene. Tabu Tek later on withdrew from releasing new material but still play shows in the local scene from time to time. In 2008 Maximo Martinez released new solo material named Electrónica Ensemble Como Concepto Performático.

== History ==
=== New Page: Maximo Martinez, Early Days ===
Throughout the late 1980s and early 1990s Maximo Martinez participated in the Dominican electronic rock band New Page and produced a series of rock songs that laid the foundations for his later work. At the time, the rock scene was just starting to gain popularity in Santo Domingo. Shortly before the creation of Tabu Tek, Maximo Martinez disbanded New Page. New Page had a few significant songs that received airplay; those being "5 aňos", "Triangulo" and "Blanco y Negro".

=== Tabu Tek: Release of Girar, Rise of Popularity, Sintetik and Hiatus ===
After Martinez disbanded New Page, he settled down with Bassist Tomas Alvarez from Toque Profundo and friends Franklin Alvarez, Francisco Polanco, Jacinto Mendez, and Alberto Dujarric and formed Tabu Tek on April 15, 1995, in Santo Domingo, Dominican Republic. In 1996 Tabu Tek released their first album Girar in Santo Domingo, being well received in local radio stations and gaining the band some popularity with the release of singles like Cierra Los Ojos, Instintos and Escena Gastada. In November 1996 Martinez joined the Chilean rocker Beto Cuevas and sang along with La Ley's greatest hit "El Duelo" in a concert held in Santo Domingo. Months later, in March 1997 Tabu Tek opened for the Argentinian band Enanitos Verdes in a concert performance in Santo Domingo. In June 1997 Tabu Tek performed in the Dominican Republic's Presidente Festival and received critical acclaim from the international magazine Billboard and also released their second album material Visual. In 1999, Tabu Tek released their third and final album to date, Sintetik, with a more defined electronic rock based sound than in their previous materials. While the band has ceased producing new album material they still sporadically play at local bars in Santo Domingo like the Cinema Cafe in Plaza de la Cultura sector of the city. Maximo Martinez (now known as Max) remains somewhat active releasing his solo project Electrónica Ensemble Como Concepto Performático in 2008. Max performed in Clemente Portillo's Bar Calavera as the singer of the song "Acuario" released in 2010.

== Members ==
- Maximo Martinez — Vocals, Composer
- Tomas Alvarez — Bass
- Franklin Betances — Keyboards
- Francisco Polanco — Keyboards
- Javier Vargas — Guitar
- Alberto Dujarric — Percussion/drums
- Jacinto Alberto Mendez — Guitar

== Discography ==
=== Studio albums ===
- Girar (1997)
- Sintetik (1999)
- Visual (2003)

=== Collaboration albums ===
- Rockero Hasta La Tambora] (unreleased tribute Participation by Tabu Tek with Compadre Pedro Juan)
- Rock & Jazz: Turismo Republica Dominicana (Participation only by Maximo Martinez)
- Bar Calavera (produced by Clemente Portillo with collaborations by Maximo Martinez)
