= List of forts in colonial Santo Domingo =

This article lists Forts and Gates that were constructed during Santo Domingo's colonial rule. Many of these forts were incorporated into a defensive wall that surrounded the Ciudad Colonial, effectively creating bastions along the wall.

There are also several gates which allowed access to the city, these gates were also protected by forts. A prime example is El Baluarte del Conde and La Puerta del Conde, where La Puerta del Conde served as an entrance to the city and El Baluarte served to protect the entrance.

== Forts ==
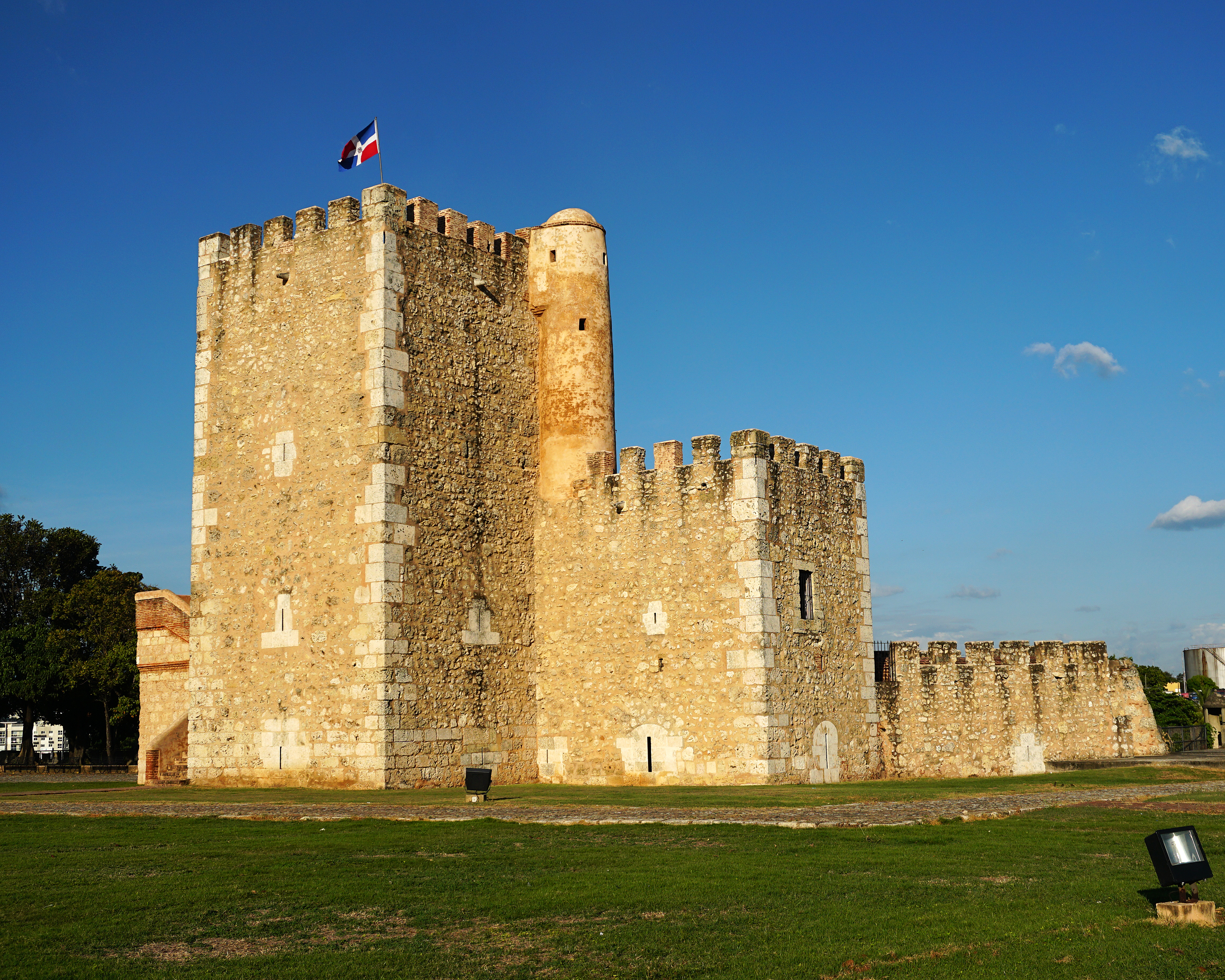
Fortaleza Ozama, Ciudad Colonial.

- Fuerte de la Concepcion
- Fuerte de la Caridad
- Fuerte de San Lazaro (Fort of Saint Lazarus)
- Fuerte de San Miguel (Fort of Saint Michael)
- Fuerte de San Francisco
- El Fuerte de Santa Barbara
- Fuerte de la Carena
- Fuerte Invencible
- Fortaleza Ozama, a sixteenth-century castle that overlooks the Ozama River.
- Fuerte San Gil
- Fuerte de San Jose (Fort of Saint Joseph)
- Fuerte de Angulo

== Gates ==
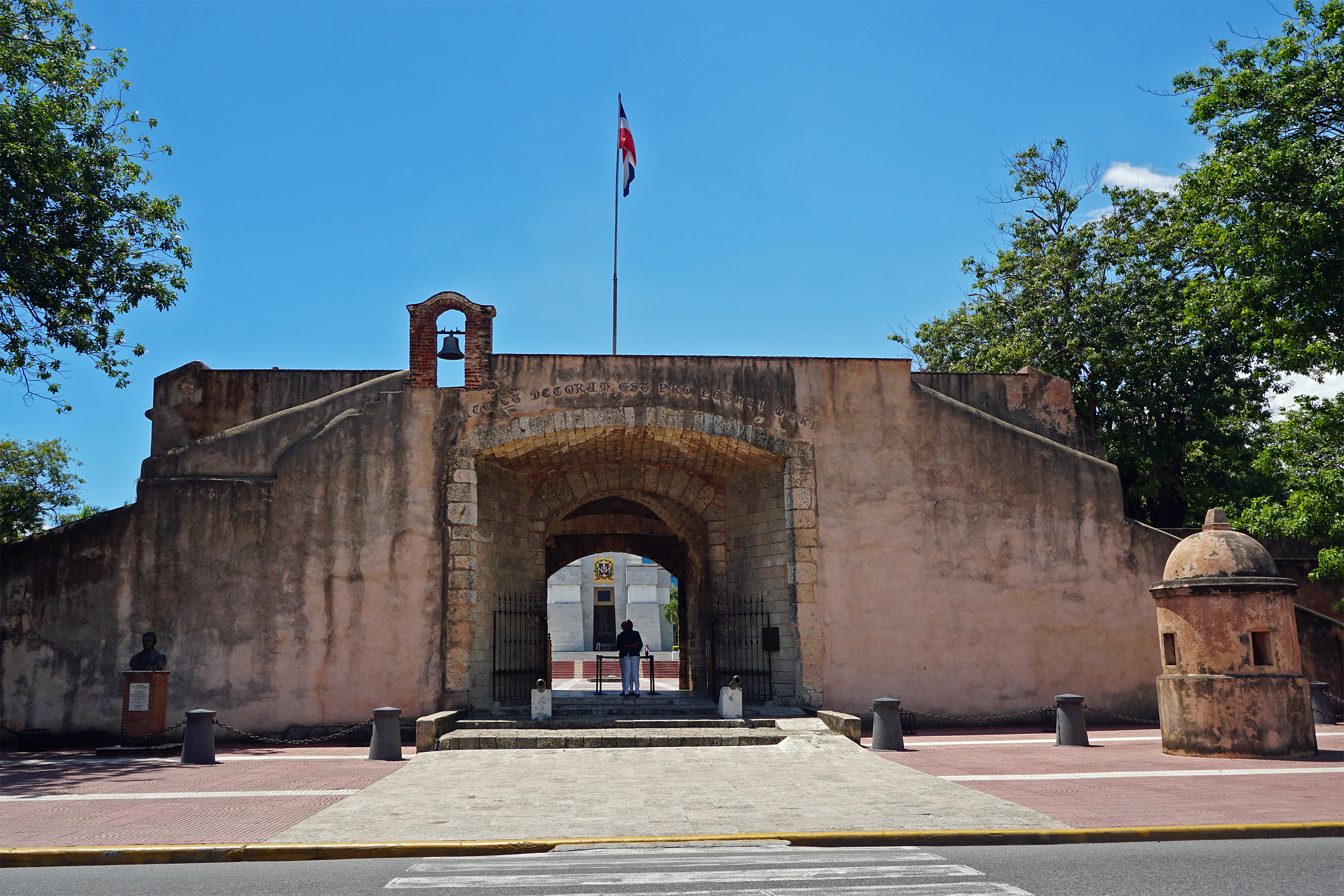
Puerta del Conde, Ciudad Colonial.

- Puerta del Conde (The Count's Gate), was the only entrance to the north and the furthest boundary of the city until around the late 19th century.
- Puerta de la Atarazans
- Puertas de San Diego, built by Alejandro de Fuenmayor in 1540
- Puerta de la Misericordia (Gates of Mercy)

== See also ==
- List of museums in the Dominican Republic
