= Front page =

Front Page or The Front Page may also refer to:

== Periodicals ==
- Frontpage (techno magazine), a German magazine for electronic music
- FrontPage Africa, a Liberian daily newspaper
- FrontPage Magazine, an online political magazine sometimes known as The Front Page
- Frontpage: Ulat ni Mel Tiangco, a Philippine news bulletin
- The Michigan FrontPage, a weekly newspaper in Detroit, Michigan

== Television and movies ==
- Front Page (newsmagazine), a short-lived TV show in 1993
- Frontpage (TV series), a 2008 Malaysian drama series
- Front Page (film), a 1990 Hong Kong film starring Michael Hui
- The Front Page (1931 film), starring Adolphe Menjou and Pat O'Brien
- The Front Page (1974 film), directed by Billy Wilder, starring Jack Lemmon and Walter Matthau
- The Front Page (TV series), an American series that aired in 1949
- "The Front Page" (Diff'rent Strokes), the final episode of the sitcom Diff'rent Strokes

== Other ==
- Front Page Challenge, a Canadian television game show that aired from 1957 to 1995
- Front Page (New Zealand company), a news and political media company
- The Front Page, a 1928 Broadway comedy written by Ben Hecht and Charles MacArthur
- Front Page, a 2003 jazz album by Biréli Lagrène, Dominique Di Piazza, and Dennis Chambers
- Microsoft FrontPage, discontinued software by Microsoft

== See also ==
- Reddit, describes itself as the front page of the Internet.
- Home page (disambiguation)
- Title page
