= New Page =

New Page can refer to:

- New Page (album), an album by F.T. Island
- New Page, former name of rock band Tabú Tek
- New Page Books, a division of Red Wheel/Weiser/Conari
- NewPage, a papermaking company
