= Frontpage (TV series) =

- Also known as: Frontpage: The Truth Behind the News
- Genre: Drama; Action
- Developed by: Filmscape
- Directed by: Kabir Bhatia
- Starring: Bernie Chan; Tony Eusoff; Jehan Miskin; Cheryl Samad; Nell Ng; Nurakhtar Amin
- Country of origin: Malaysia
- Original languages: Malay; English, etc.
- No. of seasons: 1
- No. of episodes: 13 (list of episodes)

Production
- Running time: 1 hour per ep.

Original release
- Network: ntv7
- Release: 7 September – 30 November 2008

Frontpage is the title of a Malaysian television drama created by Kabir Bhatia and Mira Mustaffa, which tells the adventures of the journalists of a fictional newspaper publisher, inspired by events which grabbed the headlines in Malaysian papers throughout history. Frontpage is jointly produced by The Star newspaper, broadcaster ntv7 and Filmscape, a production house owned by Juita Viden.

== Overview ==
Frontpage tells of the main characters as the staff of Malaysia's top newspaper The Voice, consisting of Andrea Ng (Bernie Chan) the news desk editor and all the journalists under her supervision, which consist of seasoned rivals Jack Lee (Tony Eusoff) and Dylan Pereira (Jehan Miskin), joined by newcomer Nerina Rahman (Cheryl Samad). All of them as part of a newspaper tackle a capricious profession for the sake of scooping the best for their readers. Each episode is actually adapted from real headline-grabbers from local dailies throughout the past quarter-century.

== Characters ==
=== Main characters ===
- Jack Lee, Senior Journalist, Newsdesk (played by Tony Eusoff):Aloof and rebellious, Jack prefers to do things on his own and in his own way. He does not play by the rules and hates authority figures. He takes his job seriously and will not stop at anything to bring the truth to the people. But at the same time Jack has an emotional distance to his stories. He learned how to do that, the hard way.
  When Jack was a rookie reporter, he made a promise to a whistleblower of a corporate giant, to print his story. But Jack was shut down by his editor for lack of evidence (or supposed fear of retaliation by the corporation). The whistleblower committed suicide. Jack felt responsible and it took a long time before he could forget (but not forgive himself). Jack was offered to post of editor a few years back, but he refused. He is not a desk person, and he will never leave the street. Andrea accepted the position.
- Andrea Ng, Editor, Newsdesk (Bernie Chan):Andrea knows as a woman handling the news desk of the country's biggest newspaper, she is always in the firing line -from the public, from the bosses, and from the journalists. There's always someone, somewhere who is displeased with her. She develops a tough exterior, but we see a more vulnerable side of her outside of work.
  Andrea and Jack dated when she first joined the newspaper, but Jack's too much of a loner to ever really commit to anyone. Andrea is now dating Dylan, but in the back of her mind, she's always wondered if Dylan is with her for herself, or is it some twisted way of up one ship in his rivalry with Jack.
  Andrea was killed off in episode 9, by having shot from behind by what happened to be a victim of a loan shark whose advertisement was published in the Voice.
- Dylan Pereira, Journalist, Newsdesk (Jehan Miskin):Dylan has climbed the proverbial ladder one step at a time. Although he is passionate about his work, Dylan believes in playing by the book – no gray areas, no crossing the lines. It annoys him to see Jack getting away with some of the things he does. And how Andrea lets him. Apparently the same rules do not apply to Jack as to everyone else.
  Dylan is also less than happy with Jack and Andrea's past relationship. He suspects she still has feelings for Jack, although she denies it.
- Nerina Rahman, Rookie Journalist (Cheryl Samad):Nerina had wanted to be journalist since she was in primary school, when her exposé on "ulat in the nasi lemak" in the school paper caused the school to change canteen operator and the other kids to think of her as a hero. She joins the newspaper in spite of her wealthy father's protests, fully intending to bring down the bad guys and rescuing the innocent. But Nerina is about to discover that the bad guys are sometimes the good guys.
  Nerina has a huge crush on Jack, but he is intent on pushing her away. Nerina is unaware of Jack and Andrea's past, and wonders why Andrea is very sharp to her sometimes and overly protective at others.
- Lulu Chia, Senior Journalist, Lifestyle (Nell Ng):Lulu has a sharp tongue, and a sharper pen. Her stories have embarrassed actresses, designers, record companies. She is someone everyone in the entertainment industry loves to hate. Lulu is not bothered when people chide her for being not at all disconcerted by what they think of her. After all she's not making up the stories, she's just reporting them. Her view is: "if you don't want it in the papers, don't do it."
  Growing up, Lulu constantly struggled with issues of self-esteem. She was always big for her age, and her "unique" tastes in clothes became the butt of jokes. Lulu sees her position in the newspaper as divine retribution. It's her job to bring down all those beautiful people who made life miserable for people like her, people who are different.
- Rebecca Anuar, Senior Journalist (Nurakhtar Amin):Rebecca says what's on her mind, always. She appears cold, and arrogant, but her tough exterior hides a troubled past. At a young age, her father, an Englishman, abandoned her mother. Her mother married another man, but he maltreated her sexually during her early adolescence. She also attempted to flee from her home and commit suicide. At 15, Rebecaa went to boarding school despite her stepfather's objections.
  In boarding school, Rebecca excelled in her studies, and every other girl hated her for her antisocial behaviour. Her interest in journalism stemmed from the need to expose the truth. Once she left home, she never went back, cutting all ties with her mother and stepfather. After university, she joined the Tribune, and quickly became a top notch reporter. She has never had a relationship with any man. She left the Tribune, for The Voice because one of her colleagues "wanted to know her better (romantically)". Rebecca crumbles at the prospect of anyone getting to know her. Despite her façade of confidence, she always feels that she is spoiled and not worthy to be loved; or to love.

=== Supporting characters ===
- "Chief" (Priyadev Aravind):Ketua Penyunting The Voice. Priyadev himself is a sub-editor for the Star. Without a known name, the character is only known "Chief"; he was originally designated the name "Mr. Tan".
- Melvin D'Cruz: Sub-editor of The Voice.
- Lorna Liu:Marketing director of The Voice.

== Episode list ==
#	Title	Airdate	Synopsis
1	No Way Out	7 September 2008	The Kapak Gang is gaining notoriety for their violent crimes. A member of the gang, realising the error of his ways desperately wants out, but knows he will not be allowed to walk away alive. He knows too many secrets. His only hope is to get the gang arrested, and without them knowing his involvement. He contacts Jack Lee, the Voice's ace reporter, to ask for help. Jack jumps into the case, doing everything he can to help his source.
2	Pieces of You	14 September 2008	A witch doctor, Maya Saari and her son killed a high-profile businessman, and were sentenced to death. Before she is hanged, Maya asks to see Jack to reveal a secret – her list of clients, with photographs as irrefutable proof. It is well known that Maya's former clientele has been the who's who of Malaysian society. Each of them has plenty to lose should Maya decide to reveal their black magic practises. Jack finds his life in danger when "someone" goes to all lengths to keep Maya's list a secret. This episode is inspired by the Mona Fandey trial, which witnessed the execution of witch doctor by hanging in 2001 for the murder and brutal mutilation of a politician in 1993.
3	In the Name of the Father	21 September 2008	Badminton star, Annie Ong returns after winning a major championship. The newspapers rain accolades on her, but the shy Annie refuses interviews. The next day, she is found dead in her hostel, apparently having committed suicide. Her death causes an uproar in the country. It is also puzzling why someone who has everything to live for, should take her own life. Jack and Rebecca find out there is more to the story than meets the eye.
4	Ride to Hell	28 September 2008	Dylan's ex-girlfriend asks him to help her find her missing 14-year-old sister. Dylan decides to investigate and goes undercover. He makes a disturbing discovery of runaway girls and their mat rempit boyfriends. One wrong turn can lead to a chain of disastrous events. Can Dylan stop this one girl's life from ending in a tragedy?
5	Queen for a Day	5 October 2008	A beauty queen carries the title for only one day before she is brutally murdered. The suspects are many. Apparently, in spite of her family's insistence that she is a "good" girl, Nerina and Jack find out that there are many men who have visited her apartment in the past year. But who among these men who all loved her, ended up killing her?
6	The Secret Kingdom	12 October 2008	A mysterious girl is found in a jungle covered in blood and barely alive. Rebecca recognises the hook symbol branded on the girl as the work of a cult, Jannatul Adawiyah. Jack infiltrates the cult that practises their own religion and believes that their leader is God. Rebecca follows him there, in spite of his warning. Will they manage to rescue the other young girls in the cult? And will they make it out alive?
7	MMS	19 October 2008	Jin and Black are clubbing buddies. Three nights a week, they crawl from club to club until the sun comes up. One night, high on drugs, Jin tries to chat up a girl but was turned down. Walking out, Jin tells Black that he's going to "teach that bitch a lesson." The next day Black receives an MMS of the same girl, being tortured and killed. The MMS circulates around the city and Dylan goes undercover to find out who is behind the murder.
8	Lights, Camera, Action	26 October 2008	During the shooting of a movie, a famous lead actor is accidentally shot, and killed. But is it a tragic accident? Or is it a brilliantly disguised murder? In a classic whodunit manner, the suspects are many; the failing director, the jealous propsman, the unconsolable lead actress, the list goes on. Motive and opportunity also abounds. It is up to Rebecca and Lulu to find out the truth behind this fiction. Meanwhile, a tragedy looms at the office.
9	Taxi Driver	2 November 2008	A serial murderer is on the loose. A frightened taxi driver tells Jack that his life is in danger. He says that the murderer had taken his cab to the murder scene and told him to keep mum. But he cannot live with murder on his hands, he has to tell someone. Now he fears that the murderer is going to come after him. Jack shadows the taxi driver to get closer to the murderer. While Jack goes on the chase, Andrea's life hangs in balance.
10	Gone Baby Gone	9 November 2008	A boy named Aiman is snatched from the playground, and the kidnappers ask for ransom to ensure his safe return. At wit's end, the parents decide to do something less than honourable to pay for the kidnapper's demands, i.e. faking their infant daughter's heart problem. Nerina smells something fishy and decides to investigate. She and Rebecca followed the ransom trail to catch the culprit, who happens to be the former maid in Aiman's household and an accomplice, and save the child. Meanwhile, Jack finds it hard to adjust to life without Andrea; he had been promoted to the Editor post but does not seem to have what it takes to be one.
11	Shufflers	16 November 2008	A 19-year-old shuffler is found dead. His death sparks a fight between the shufflers and the rockers who have long resented each other over turf. Nerina bumps into Dylan who is on an extended leave after Andrea's death. Dylan helps her find out who is behind the murder. It seems that the only one who knows what actually happened, is a transgender prostitute who was the last person to see the victim alive.
12	Sex, Lies and the Internet	23 November 2008	A popular nasheed singer is well known for her piousness and innocence. It is therefore shocking when a clip of her having sex surfaces on the internet. She goes on the defence and announces it is fake – the work of someone who wants to bring her down. But when a second clip surfaces, she has to face the truth. There is a camera in her home. The release of the videos puts a spotlight on an intricate web of sex, lies, blackmail and murder.
13	The End of the Line	30 November 2008	An international crime head is due to be executed. His three cohorts arrive in a last-ditch effort to rescue him. When their plans falter, they decide on Plan B – an exchange of a life for their boss'. Jack's life.
