= Día de la Altagracia =

Dominican religious holiday

- Observed by: Dominican Republic
- Type: Religious
- Significance: feast day for "Our Lady of Altagracia!", protector of the Dominican Republic
- Date: January 21
- Next time: 21 January 2026
- Frequency: annual

Día de la Altagracia, or Altagracia Day, is a day commemorating the patronal image and protector of the people of the Dominican Republic. It is a feast day and annual public holiday on January 21. "Our Lady of Altagracia" is a portrait of the Virgin Mary painted in the 16th century. The portrait is kept in the Basílica Catedral Nuestra Señora de la Altagracia in the city of Salvaleón de Higüey.

The festival was originally held on August 15, but was moved to January 21 to celebrate victory over the French in 1690. Patron saint of Dominican Republic.
