= Transporte Urbano =

Dominican rock group

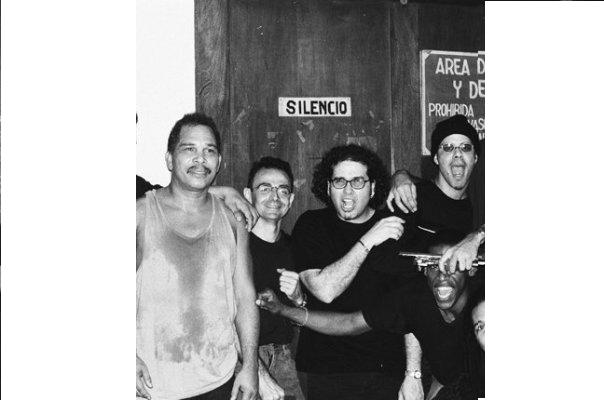

Background information
- Genres: Rock,
- Years active: 1982–2004

Transporte Urbano is a rock group from the Dominican Republic.

== History ==
Transporte Urbano was founded by the Dominican composer Luis Días, in 1982, after he returned from a temporary stay in New York City.

Días, a pioneer of Dominican urban folk music and one of the founders of the folk group Convite, wanted to create Dominican music with a new vision of what it could be. This arose from his contact with punk and other rock expressions while living in New York City in the early 1980s and led to the birth of Transporte Urbano.

Días chose a few young, Santo Domingo-based musicians for this project: Juan Francisco Ordóñez on electric guitar, Guy Frómeta on drums, Héctor Santana on bass (later replaced by Peter Nova), Bruno Ranson on sax and percussionist José Duluc. Eventually the group settled into a guitar/bass/drums power trio format fronted by Días. (The Días/Ordóñez/Nova/Frómeta lineup is considered Transporte Urbano's classic lineup.)

In 1983, the band made their debut at the Altos de Chavón amphitheatre, opening for jazz musician Bob James, and in April of the same year for the British band English Beat, at the same venue.

Transporte Urbano's performance at "Varadero 87", a music festival celebrated in Cuba, became infamous when their appearance and music were considered "unsuitable" by certain Cuban cultural authorities, who were expecting a merengue or more traditional sounding group. The members of the band were "invited" to leave the country the day after the show. However, the young Cuban press supported the performance of the band, as well as noted Cuban singer/songwriter Pablo Milanés.

Transporte Urbano remained active on the Dominican musical scene until 2004, when they performed a show for the Dominican culture ministry, at a tribute to Días. Luis Dias died 5 years later in Santo Domingo, on 8 December 2009, at 57 years of age from a heart attack and kidney and liver complications.

== Relevance ==
Transporte Urbano was the first band to make authentic Dominican rock. Although there were earlier rock groups on the island, this was the first time a Dominican rock band had a clear mark of originality. They are considered highly influential and Dias' being regarded "the father of Dominican rock" stems directly from his work with Transporte Urbano.

Along with the distinct social commentary content of Días' songs, the band mixed in the universal sounds of rock and jazz and referenced authentic Dominican rhythms, generating a new musical style.

Transporte Urbano, who gained recognition for their live performances, collaborated with and performed songs written by Luis Dias exclusively.

== Recordings ==
- 1999 Luis Días y Transporte Urbano En Vivo
- 2000 Vickiana Las Sesiones de 1985 (with Transporte Urbano)
- 2004 DVD Luis Terror Días: El terror en vivo (with Transporte Urbano and Irka Mateo)

== Sources ==
- This article is based on a translation from the article in Spanish Wikipedia es:Transporte Urbano
- Arvelo Caamaño, Mario. La primera tierra (in Spanish), 1st edition, May 2000. Pags 51-54 ISBN 0-615-11428-8
