= Sonia Silvestre =

Dominican singer and radio host (1952–2014)

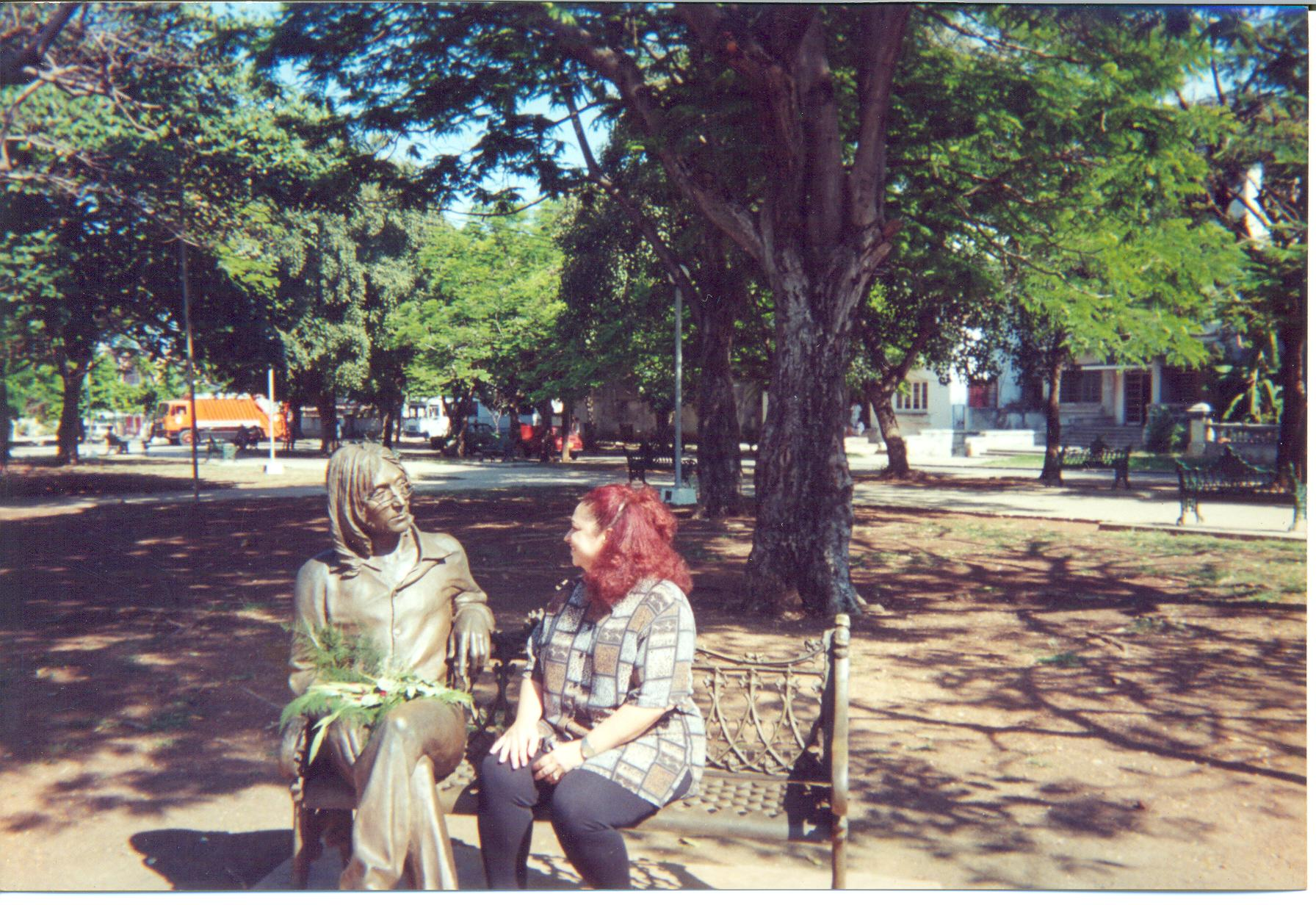
- Sonia Silvestre in 2012
- Born: 16 August 1952; San Pedro de Macorís, Dominican Republic
- Died: 19 April 2014 (aged 61); Santo Domingo, Dominican Republic
- Occupation: Singer
- Spouse(s): Yaqui Núñez del Risco (divorced); José Betancourt (2009–2014)
- Children: 2

Sonia Silvestre (16 August 1952 – 19 April 2014) was a Dominican singer from San Pedro de Macorís.

She was married to broadcaster, producer, and host Yaqui Núñez del Risco. After their divorce, Silvestre moved to Mexico, where she lived for about three years. She later entered a long-term relationship with Venezuelan photographer, José Betancourt, who became the father of her son André and her daughter Eloísa; they married in 2009. In 2010, she performed a tribute to Luis Días.

She suffered a massive stroke and two heart attacks on 17 April 2014 in Santo Domingo. She was 61 years old.

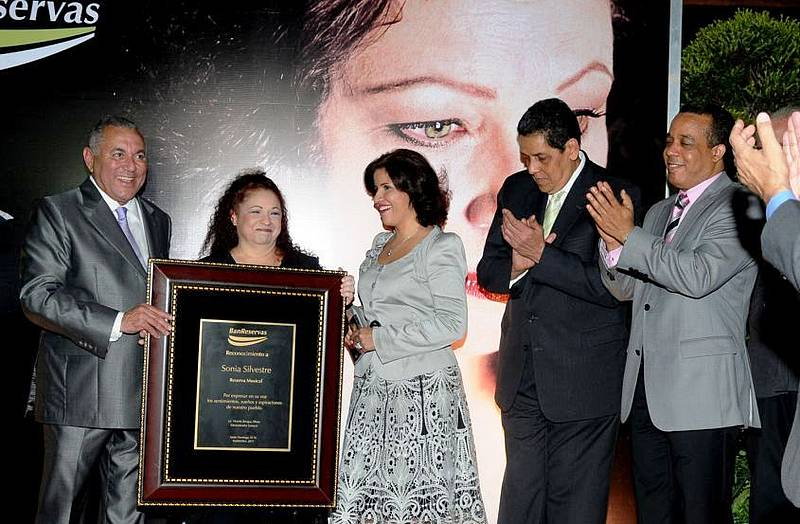
Sonia Silvestre at an awards ceremony

== Discography ==
- 1974: Esta Es Sonia Silvestre
- 1975: La Nueva Canción
- 1976: Nueva Canción
- 1978: Sonia Canta Poetas de la Patria
- Folkhoy
- Corazón de Vellonera
- Una Verdadera Intérprete
- Mi Corazón Te Seguirá
- Edición Especial de Grandes Éxitos de los Años 70
- 1990: Yo Quiero Andar
- 1994: Amor y Desamor
- 2007: Verde y Negro
