= Toque Profundo =

Dominican rock band

- Origin: Santo Domingo, Dominican Republic
- Genres: Rock en español, Punk rock, Alternative
- Years active: 1989–present
- Members: Tony Almont; Tomas Alvarez; Joel Lazala
- Past members: Leo Susana; Clemente Portillo; Ernesto Baez; Lorenzo Zayas Bazán; Máximo Gómez

Toque Profundo, sometimes referred to as Toque, or TP, is a rock music group from the Dominican Republic, the most successful of the local Dominican bands to date in the late 1980s and 1990s. Most of the songs were related to their native country, and some songs, like "El Jevito" and "Mi País", involved social criticism and issues within Dominican culture.

== History ==
It all started in 1989 when Toque Profundo participated in the popular event "Las Olimpiadas del Rock" (English: Rock Olympics). The original lineup was: Tony Almont (vocals), Leo Susana (guitars), Osvaldo Peña (bass), Lorenzo Zayas-Bazan (keyboards) and Maximo Gomez (drums). They were the best out of 15 participating bands in the event, edging out favorites "Arcangel" by a very small margin in a legendary duel. The band slowly gained experience and acceptance from the small Dominican rock listeners in Santo Domingo.

In 1992 they released their first independent album Sueños y Pesadillas del Tercer Mundo (Dreams and Nightmares of The 3rd World). This was the first CD ever at that time to be released independently by their own financial means. The album helped them reach the top of mainstream rock in the Dominican Republic and was deemed a total success. Most of the songs by Toque Profundo in this album relate to the Country's economic or social situation. The record featured songs such as Mi País, a song in the style of a rock opera, which took a satirical swipe at the pros and cons of life in the Dominican Republic, as well as songs addressing themes such as the 1965 Dominican Civil War and South African anti-apartheid activist Nelson Mandela. Some examples of less serious lyrical content appear on El Gevito, a track about fashion-obsessed Dominican young men which were part of the Dominican popular culture in the '80s, and El Bolero Del Bionico which describes the adventures and perils on riding in a cheap taxi ride.

That same year they were nominated as "Best Rock Group" in the Cassandra Awards, a similar Dominican version of the Grammy Awards. They also were involved in the international event "Rock Sobre Las Piedras" which took place at Altos de Chavón.

Towards 1993 the young group was chosen by Dominicans to represent them in the international event "Festival De Benidorm" in Spain with the song "Dios Salve Al Viajero"(God Save The Traveler). In 1996 they released their 2nd independent album named "Moneda" (Spanish for ‘coins’, also refers to money). Bigger success resulted from this second album. Songs Like "Llorar", the long-awaited "Dios Salve Al Viajero" and "Ramona"(a playful take on Eric Clapton's classic unplugged rendition of “Layla”), all became top No. 1 hits on radio. This album is considered a classic within Dominican rock culture and, at the same time, sparked the “local rock bands” evolution.

In 1999 they released The 3rd Album "Cría Cuervos" (sort of like “Breed Crows”), which became their most successful album of their career at that date. Tracks like "Botas Negras", "Liberate", and "Noche Sin Luna" also became top No. 1 singles. "Noche Sin Luna" later became the longest-enduring song to remain in the top No. 1 list on Dominican radio. "Cría Cuervos", like the two preceding albums, was an independent album showing the musical growth of the band and their ever-growing fan base in their native country and in Latin America.

Further recordings led up to the release of their 4th album, titled "Magia", in 2002. International critical acclaim has often reputed it to be their best composed, best prepared album. This album was different from its predecessors in the fact that it expanded the musical aspect and explored the band's maturity and potential to compose and record music. Influences from other cultures were included in this recording, which gave it the best rating among the four albums of their career. This album throws in dashes of punk, afro, alternative, and guitar-based fusions, completely breaking all barriers established on previously released albums. The singles "El Viaje" and "Angel Ciego" also manage to climb the top position on radio stations in the country for several weeks.

=== Later history ===
In mid-2003, rumors of possible disbanding of Toque Profundo were rampant but never became official. Due to the Dominican Republic's critical economic situation TP was forced to cease concerts, and each member found themselves trying to find ways to expand their musical horizons. Around this time some members formed several project bands, and guitarist Clemente Portillo left the country to the United States to live in Atlanta. Tony Almont spent that summer playing sporadic gigs in New York City and through word of mouth was also able to promote Toque Profundo's body of work as well. These efforts resulted in a showcase in Sirius Satellite Radio, an interview in Music Choice, and concert at SOB's in Downtown Manhattan. To this date, those interviews remain the broadest exposure to any Dominican Rock Band in North America.

After that mini-tour, the band ceased the production of new material, playing sporadically in venues across Santo Domingo. Band members started their own personal projects and the band seemed to take a secondary role among its members .

However, to the surprise of many, in December 2009, Toque Profundo celebrated their 20th anniversary in Hard Rock Cafe Santo Domingo and a few weeks later released a new single named "El Experimento" which quickly climbed up the charts of Dominican rock stations. El Experimento marked their first release of music after their last album Magia in 2002. Concerts were held in Santo Domingo and also in New York City.

Toque Profundo has remained active ever since releasing the singles "Salta", "Alcohol y Celular", and "Vivo" through 2011. They have continued to play numerous gigs throughout the Dominican Republic and the Northeastern United States.

In 2014, Toque Profundo released its latest Production, Vivo, as a digital-only release including singles released previously since 2010 and several new tracks including "Rock Radio" and "Dance MF"

== Members ==
- Tomás Álvarez - bass (since 1990)
- Tony Almont - vocals (since 1989)
- Joel Lazala - drums (since 1992)

=== Past members ===
- Clemente Portillo - guitar (Since 1995; Hiatus since May 2003 until March 2005; until 2016”
- Ernesto Báez
- Máximo Gómez
- Lorenzo Zayas Bazan
- Leo Susana
- Ariel Sánchez (Since November 2003-march 2005) currently on live shows since 2017
- Osvaldo Peña (El Sobi)

== Discography ==
=== Albums ===
- Sueños Y Pesadillas Del 3er Mundo (1992)
- Moneda (1996)
- Cría Cuervo (1999)
- Version 3.5 (Mixtape) (2000)
- Magia (2002)
- Vivo (2014)
- Cria Cuervos - 30 Aniversario (2022)

=== Singles ===
- El Jevito (1989)
- Mi País (1990)
- Ramona (1992)
- Viajero (1994)
- Lloraré (1996)
- Tu Me Conoces (1996)
- Noche Sin Luna (1999)
- Mi País [20 Años] (2009)
- Alcohol y Celular (2010)
- El Experimento (2010)
- Salta (2011)
- Rock Radio (2013)
- Perder La Razón (2015)
- Babel (2017)
- Mi Morena / Ramona (Medley) (2018)
- Llévame Despacio (2018)
- Bolero del Biónico - Remake Sinfónico 30 Aniversario (2019)
- Amnesia Selectiva (2021)
- Cria Cuervos - 30 Aniversario (2022)

== See also ==
- Dominican rock
- Dominican Republic
