= List of museums in the Dominican Republic =

This is a list of museums in the Dominican Republic.

== Museums in the Dominican Republic ==
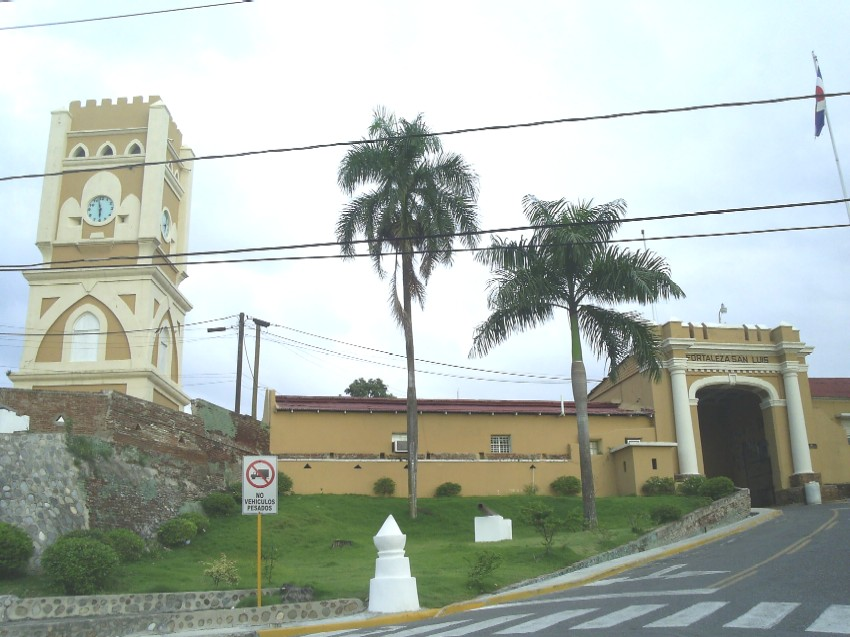
Fortaleza San Luis, Dominican Republic

- Alcázar de Colón
- Columbus Lighthouse
- Fortaleza San Felipe
- Fortaleza San Luis
- Memorial Museum of Dominican Resistance
- Museo Bellapart
- Museo de las Casas Reales
- Museo del Hombre Dominicano

== See also ==
- List of forts in colonial Santo Domingo
