= Instituto Cultural Dominico-Americano =

Instituto Cultural Dominico-Americano (IDCA) is an organization based in Santo Domingo, Dominican Republic. It is a collaboration between the Dominican and US governments. The IDCA, known as El Domínico-Americano, founded in 1947. They operate the Colegio Domínico-Americano, (in English, the School of the Dominican American Institute).
