= Palo music =

Dominican sacred music

Palo
- Stylistic origins: Afro-Dominican rhythms
- Cultural origins: Dominican Republic
- Typical instruments: alcahuete, auxiliar, mayor, and minor palo drums, güira, maracas, vocals

Other topics
- Music of the Dominican Republic

Palo, also known as atabales, is a Dominican (Dominican Republic) sacred music that can be found through the island. The drum and human voice are the principal instruments. Palo is played at religious ceremonies - usually coinciding with saint's days - as well as for secular parties and special occasions. Its roots are in the Congo region of central-west Africa, but it is mixed with European influences in the melodies. Palos are related to Dominican folk Catholicism, which includes a pantheon of deities/saints (here termed misterios) much like those found in the Afro-American syncretic religious traditions of Cuba, Brazil, Haiti, and elsewhere. Palos are usually associated with the black and mixed populations. They can be seen in different regions of Dominican Republic, but with variations.

== Instruments ==
Palo music is played on long drums termed palos. The word palos means sticks, and therefore all Dominican palos drums are instruments made from hollowed out logs. The head of the drum is made of cowhide and it is attached to the log portion with hoops and pegs in the Eastern region, or with nails in the Southwest. There is a master drum (palo mayor) which is the large, wide drum played with slimmer drums (alcahuetes) alongside: two in the East or three elsewhere. Palos are usually played with guiras, which are metal scrapers. They may also be played with maracas, or a little stick used to hit the master drum, called the catá. The Dominican region in which the palos are played determines the form, the number of the instruments, and how they are played.

== Tradition ==
Palos are associated with the Dominican brotherhoods called cofradías. Originally, the brotherhoods were composed solely of males. As time progressed, females and family inheritance maintained the brotherhoods’ sanctity. Each brotherhood is devoted to a particular saint. Therefore, it is the responsibility of the brotherhood to honor the saint with a festival. Historically, cofradías were established on principles similar to those of the Mediterranean guild-based societies and those founded by Africans that inhabited southern Spain. Through colonization and the slave trade, these traditions were brought to the Dominican Republic.

Palo music is generally played at festivals honoring saints (velaciones) or during other religious events. The configuration of instruments present depends on the region in which these events take place. Palo drums are played with the hands, held between the legs, and tied to the palero's waist by a rope. The three paleros each play a distinct beat on their palos, which ultimately blend together. These rhythms vary depending on the region as well. For example, in the East, the "palo corrido" rhythm is popular, while in San Cristóbal, one may be more likely to find the "palo abajo" rhythm. While they play their drums, one of the paleros simultaneously sings verses of a song. The surrounding audience often invokes spirits of ancestors or saints, and it is not unusual to encounter participants becoming possessed at these events.

== See also ==
- Afro-Dominican
- Culture of the Dominican Republic
- Music of the Dominican Republic
