= Luis Días (composer) =

Dominican musician (1952–2009)

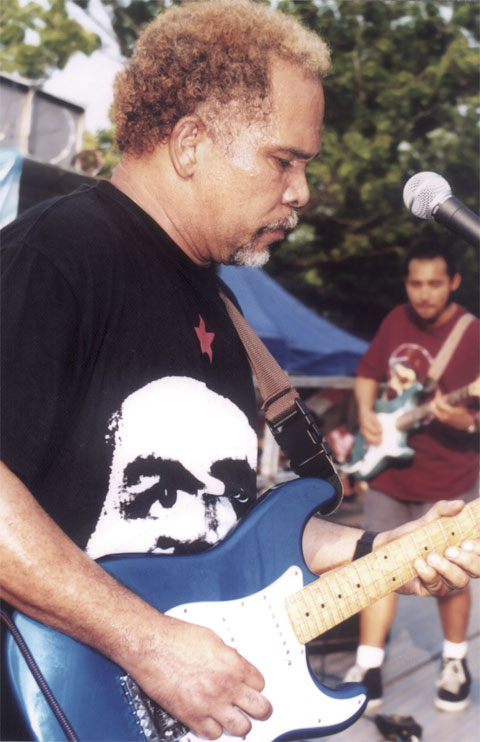
- Días playing an electric guitar

Background information
- Born: Luis Días Portorreal; June 21, 1952; Bonao, Dominican Republic
- Died: December 8, 2009 (aged 57) Santo Domingo, Dominican Republic
- Genre: Dominican music
- Occupations: Musician, singer-songwriter, composer, guitarist
- Instrument: Guitar
- Years active: 1972–2009

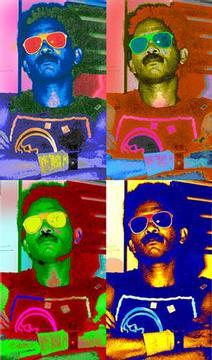
Luis Terror with glasses

Luis Díaz Portorreal, best known as Luis Días (June 21, 1952 – December 8, 2009), was a Dominican Republic musician, composer and performer of popular music.

He was immersed in the popular music and customs of Dominican folklore. In the artistic realms he is known as "El Terror" ("The Terror"), due to his particular performance style and his overtones.

He was the author of lyrics and music that fused many diverse musical styles. In some circles, Luis was considered to be the Father of Dominican Rock, due to his contributions to alternative music and his experimentation with Dominican rhythms blended with rock guitar patterns. In his fusions, Luis accomplished fusions of rock, reggae, jazz and blues with more than 40 ethnic rhythms from the Dominican Republic and Haiti, such as merengue, bachata, and mangulina, among many others.

== Biography ==
The composer, guitarist and singer named Luis Díaz Portorreal was born in Bonao, Dominican Republic, on June 21, 1952. Since childhood, he felt a direct impulse to become a musician, given that his father was a Tres player, (an instrument similar to the guitar used in rural Dominican towns), and his mother was a singer of Salves. Lively melodies and rhythms, along with the artistic environment that contained them, were natural surroundings in his life.

He covered his first musical lessons in his own hometown, with the musicians Juan Zorrilla and Tatán Jiménez, and at his 16 years of age he formed his first music band, "Los Chonnys".

In 1970 he changed his residence to Santo Domingo with a main objective of studying psychology at the Universidad Autónoma de Santo Domingo (UASD).

He died in Santo Domingo on December 8, 2009, after suffering a heart attack and other complications therein. His funeral procession was one of the longest in recent Dominican history, parading through the barrios of Santo Domingo.

== Career ==
In 1972, upon the initiative of the sociologist Dagoberto Tejada, he began as a guitarist and singer in the band Convite, a musical band on a mission to rescue a variety of rhythms found in the island from obscurity. Other original members were Dagoberto himself, Ana Marina Guzmán (singer), José Enrique Trinidad and José Rodríguez (lyrics and backup vocals), Miguel Mañaná (percussion), José Castillo (percussion) and Iván Domínguez (percussion).

Convite was a true musical novelty during that time. They had notable participations at "El Festival Internacional de la Nueva Canción "Siete Días con el Pueblo"" (International Festival of the New Song "Seven Days with the People") in Santo Domingo, 1974, in which Dias' composition "Obrero Acepta Mi Mano" (Laborer, Accept My Hand) was named as the official theme song, and was afterwards recorded by different protest song bands such as "Expresión Joven" (Dominican Republic) and "Los Guaraguao" (Venezuela).

After Convite broke up in 1978, Días formed another band named "Madora" together with Gustavo Moré, Wellinton Valenzuela, Carlos Fernández, and Luis Ruiz. In this new experiment they sought a fusion between jazz and Antillean folklore. In "Madora," Luis culminated a full decade worth of reelaborating and restoring root songs of Dominican tradition. That year he also participated in the XI World Festival of Youth and Students in Havana, 1978.

Between 1980 and 1982, Luis Días traveled to New York City, where he focused on teaching workshops about traditional Dominican music at the American Museum of Natural History. During this time he was deeply influenced by jazz and punk culture.

== Birth of Dominican Rock ==
Although various styles of rock music had been performed in his native country for quite a few years prior, Dias' return to the Dominican Republic in 1982 represents for many observers the authentic birth of Dominican Rock. He formed the band Transporte Urbano (Urban Transportation) together with Juan Francisco Ordóñez (guitar), Guy Frómeta (drums), Héctor Santana (bass guitar), José Duluc (percussion) and Bruno Ranson (saxophone). A few years later, Hector Santana was replaced with Peter Nova on the bass guitar.

In Transporte Urbano they would pour a wide variety of their musical influences, from Bachata to heavy metal.

== Awards ==
In 1983, he was granted a national award for his composition of the main theme song for the Dominican Carnival. The theme was named "Carnaval", but is better known as "Baila en la Calle" (Dance in the Streets). The theme's first performers were Sonia Silvestre and Luis Días himself. By 1985, the very popular Dominican merenguero Fernando Villalona recorded the song with the label Kubaney. To date, the aforementioned version has achieved the highest levels of popularity and recognition.

In 1984, his L.P. Luis "Terror" Días came on the market, which mainly contained songs in Merengue rhythm, such as "Ay Ombe", "Liborio" and "La porquería", among others.

In 1985, he participated in the XII World Festival of Youth and Students (Moscow).

He was commissioned to compose the soundtrack for Carlos Cristalini's short film Las Pausas del Silencio (The Pauses of Silence). They received the silver award for Best Original Music at the Philadelphia International Film Festival in 1984.

In 1986, he published a book titled Tránsito Entre Guácaras (Transportation in Between Caves), a work of poetry taking Taíno myths as a source of inspiration. He was also contracted by UNICEF to compose the song "Los Niños Sin Padres" ("Children Without Parents"), which was performed alongside singers Sergio Vargas and Sonia Silvestre.

More than three hundred of his songs have been recorded by various artists and bands. Some notable examples are: Sergio Vargas ("Marola", "Las Vampiras", "La Novia"), Kaki Vargas ("Los Mosquitos Puyan"), Wilfrido Vargas ("La Pringamosa"), Sonia Silvestre ("Mi Guachimán", "Yo Quiero Andar", "Andrecito Reyna"), Dionis Fernández ("El Guardia del Arsenal"), Los Hijos del Rey ("Rocapiedra"), Fernando Villalona ("Carnaval (Baila en la Calle)"), Alex Bueno ("Gigante"), July Mateo "Rasputin" ("El Carrito") and Marc Anthony ("Si He De Morir"), among others.

Among the many awards he has received are Lyricist of the Year (Casandra Awards, 1989) and Composer of the Year (Casandra Awards, 1990).

After several years of performances in the Caribbean region, the United States and South America, and after taking his art to Paris, Marseille, Moscow, Leningrad, Madrid, Tenerife, Barcelona, and Lisbon, in 1991 he returned to New York, where he would continue his intense work surrounding culture and ethnic studies.

At this stage in life, Luis Días composed the sound track for several films, such as the short film "Portrait of Teresa" (1993), which was presented at the San Juan Cinemafest. Another highlight is his collaboration with David Byrne in the soundtrack for the film Blue in the Face (1995), in which Marc Anthony performed his song "Mi Barrio" along with a rap by Kaz and Remi Leku.

In 1997, he returned to Santo Domingo, where he received great support from the audiences at his concerts, and celebrated the release of his first compact disc recordings.

In 1999, the Centro Cultural de España in Santo Domingo and "Colecciones El Europeo" selected his work to release a compilation titled Jaleo Dominicano + Homenaje a Luis Días, this being the first time that said institution selected an artist from the American continent for such a distinction. That same year, he was appointed as Director of the Music Department at the Casa de la Cultura Dominicana in New York.

Between 2002 and 2003, he began recordings for Radio Macana, an album produced by Reynaldo García Pantaleón y Lliam Greguez, and that would include participation of his band "Las Maravillas" in the sessions. This project includes his work during Luis' stay in New York between 1999 and 2002. Despite being an independent experimental production, the album included songs that are quite representative of Luis' particular style.

In the year 2004, he is named by the Dominican Government as "National Cultural Patrimony". A concert was held in Santo Domingo in celebration of this meritorious distinction, which was recorded and released in a DVD titled "Luis Terror Días: El Terror en Vivo".

In 2005, upon a request by the Centro Cultural España in Santo Domingo, he organized a Merengue band to perform some of his main compositions made popular by other artists. This performance was recorded and later released as a DVD titled "En Vivo desde el CCE: Luis Terror Días, Merengues". That same year he authored the sound track for the Dominican film La Maldición del Padre Cardona (The Curse of Father Cardona).

In 2006, he was involved in a controversy with the Colombian pop-singer Shakira and the Haitian singer/producer Wyclef Jean, due to a section in their song "Hips Don't Lie" in which they make use of the chorus of Días' "Carnaval (Baila en la Calle), " yet with no mention of Días in the song's credits.

Luis Dias died in Santo Domingo, on December 8, 2009, at 57 years of age due to a heart attack, and kidney and liver complications.

== Discography ==
Albums

- Luis “Terror” Dias (1984)
- Merenrock (1988)
- El Accidente (1998)
- Vickiana: Las Sesiones De 1985 (2000)
- La Yola (2000)
- Radio Macana (2003)
- Tiempo De Ocio (2009)
- Luis Terror Dias y Transporte Urbano 1999 (2026)

Singles & EPs

- El Transporte Urbano (1982)
- Luis Dias Trio (1999)

Compilations

- Jaleo Dominicano + Homenaje A Luis Dias (1999)
- La Suite Folklorica Dominicana (2001)
- Lo Mejor Del Terror (2009)
