= Marcos Evangelista Adón =

Dominican revolutionary (1800–1872)

Marcos Evangelista Adon
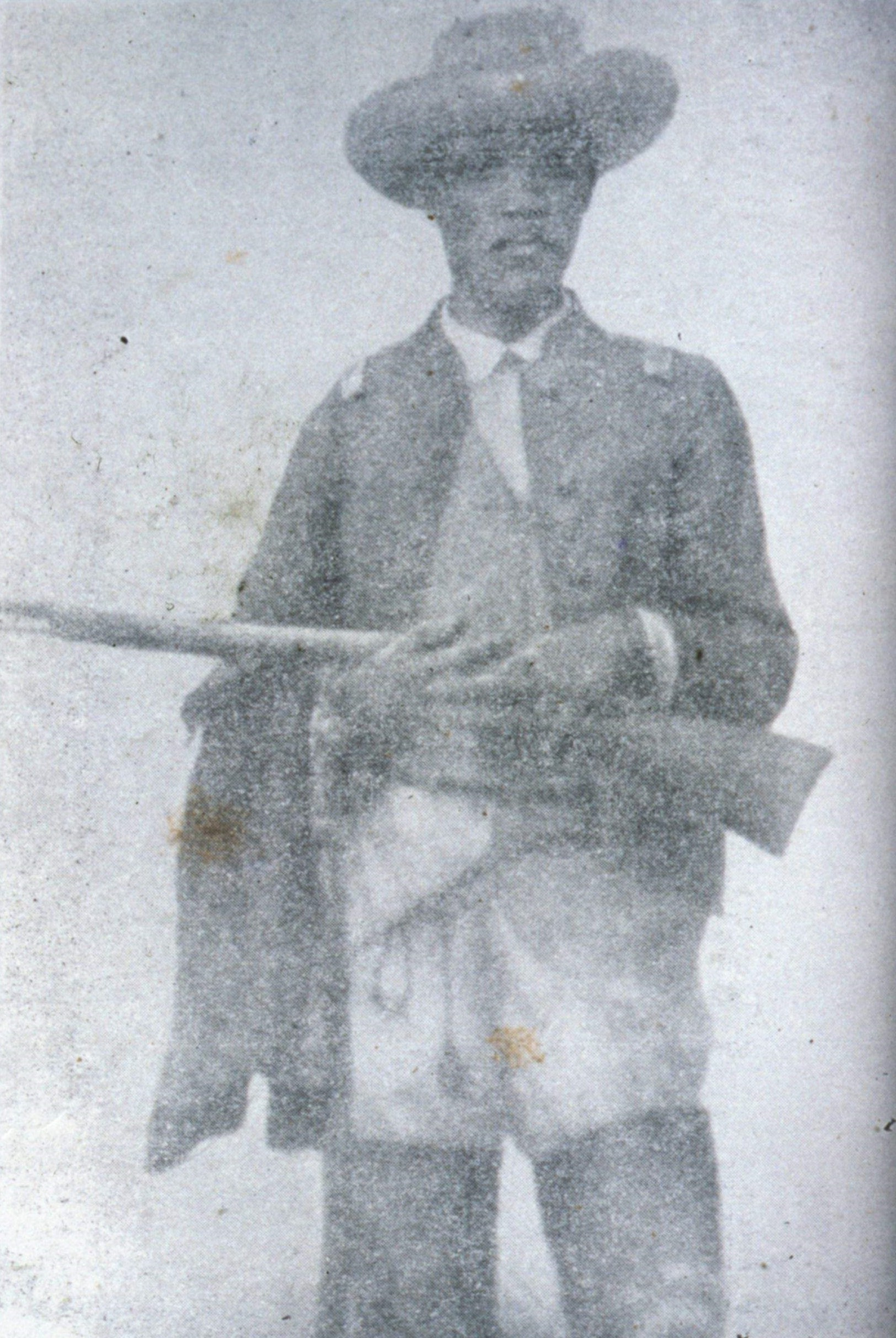
- General Adon, pictured with rifle in hand, c. 1840s–1860s
- Born: 1800; El Seibo, Captaincy General of Santo Domingo
- Died: October 22, 1872 (aged 72); Jacmel, Haiti
- Burial place: National Pantheon of the Dominican Republic
- Military career
- Allegiance: Dominican Republic
- Branch: Dominican Army
- Rank: General
- Conflicts: Dominican War of Independence; Dominican Restoration War; Six Years' War

Marcos Evangelista Adón (1800 – October 22, 1872) was a Dominican revolutionary who was a hero in 3 national wars of the Dominican Republic. He was also the founder of the Dominican town La Victoria.

== Biography ==
Adón was born in 1800 to José Lino Adón and Bernarda Abad, both Dominicans of African descent. He was two brothers, Ambrosio and Santiago, who had fought with him for the all national causes. Although born in the city of El Seibo, he would later relocate to the capital city of Santo Domingo.

He was among the participants of the independence revolt on the night of February 27, 1844. Apparently, he was part of the contingent of Seibanos who accompanied General Pedro Santana to the capital, in the days following the proclamation of independence. Having joined the ranks of the Liberation Army, he participated in many bloody battles fought in the southern region against Haitian forces in the Dominican War of Independence. By the end of the war in 1856, he attained the rank of colonel. At some point by the end of the 1850s, he reached the rank of general.

When Santana proclaimed reincorporation of Dominican Republic into the Spanish monarchy, he was 61 years old. In the files of the Dominicans who held military ranks, the Spanish described him as a man of “a lot of influence with turbulent people,” which is equivalent to saying with the Creoles that they did not willingly accept the betrayal consummated in March 1861.

Like Eusebio Manzueta, Adón was one of Pedro Santana's friends and subordinates, who did not openly oppose the decision of the general, but observed, after the fact, a distant attitude of non-complacency, in front of the civil and military authorities that Spain designated in the country. This explains the reports from spies and informers in the service of foreigners, who warned of the conduct and behavior of those men who had extensive military experience. And the Spaniards were not far from reality, since Adón was one of the first in the eastern region of the country to support the movement that began at Cerro de Capotillo on August 16, 1863, when the definitive stage of the Dominican Restoration War began. On October 2, 1863, in Hato Mayor, he led the uprising against Spain.

Once the insurrectional movement in that region failed, Adón was arrested and sent to the capital city on October 16. In November, he was sent as a prisoner to Cuba and transferred, in the same capacity, to Spain from where he escaped, returning to Santo Domingo, to join the ranks of the patriots who were fighting against the Spanish troops. Together with Eusebio Manzueta, Chief of Operations in the Eastern region, he established himself near what is now Villa Mella at the head of a flying guerrilla contingent, which prevented the passage of Spanish troops and the crossing of small steamships through the Ozama River and Yabacao River, which supplied the army quartered in the Guanuma camp. Adón's guerrillas did not allow themselves to be seen by the enemy and at night they attacked the supply convoys, creating serious problems for the opposing forces, as recognized by military leaders González Tablas and José de la Gándera, in works that review that episode.

As a result of a successful assault on a large Spanish supply convoy that also caused numerous casualties, deaths and injuries, Adón decided to found a small town near the site of his camp, which he named “Victoria del Ozama” (Ozama Victory). That small town today is known by the name of La Victoria (The Victory), and is located kilometers beyond Villa Mella. By that date, March or April 1864, the guerrilla leader was 64 years old, which means that he had entered old age, although physically fierce, he was a strong, agile and bold man as described, capable of personally leading a guerrilla contingent. in a large region, since their activities reached the foothills of the Cordillera Central, blocking the way for the Spanish intentions to penetrate the Cibao valley.

Adón's activities, as head of the guerrilla vanguard that was part of the troops in the region, commanded by Eusebio Manzueta, caused serious damage to the enemy contingents, presenting a situation worthy of taking into account on that military front. At the service of Spain, as vanguard soldiers, troops and leaders, there were Dominicans of recognized value proven on the battlefields. At least two of them operated on the Eastern Line, which was how that part of the Dominican Republic was known. One was Juan Contreras, respected as a combatant, appointed by the Spanish Chief of Operations of Monte Plata. The other, Juan Suero, called the Black Cid, also commanded troops in that region. Contreras was defeated in the Battle of Arroyo Bermejo by the patriots under the command of Gregorio Luperón, a bloody and long confrontation in which Contreras was killed in battle.

It was a sensitive loss for the enemy, but militarily and politically more costly because Luperón, in rapid movement, occupied Monte Plata, Sabana Grande de Boyá and Bayaguana, making the field of operations of the opposing troops more limited. Shortly afterwards, coincidentally on March 19, 1864, twenty years after the historic Battle of Azua had been fought, Luperón defeated Suero in the Battle of Paso del Muerto on the banks of the Yabacao River. This was the most costly for Spain because Suero and other Dominican soldiers who served under their flags had died in combat. In both confrontations, Adón was present, playing a starring role with his guerrillas, who had joined a German citizen named Brigman, supposedly naturalized although there is no record of this, who along with Olegario Tenares and other patriots was seriously injured. The permanent and tenacious offensive of the patriots ended up eliminating the possibilities of an armistice advantageous for Spain as wanted by Governor-General José de la Gandera.

Adón, at the head of his guerrillas, approached the outskirts of Santo Domingo. He demanded the eviction of the decimated Spanish forces from the Dominican Republic, in the early hours of the morning of July 11, 1865, as head of the vanguard of the patriot troops of the Eastern Line, barefoot, half-naked, hungry, loaded with glory, Marcos Adón, Brigadier General of the Armies of the Republic, entered the city of Santo Domingo. The significantly small population, which was said to have numbered no more than 7,000 inhabitants, took to the deteriorated streets to applaud and acclaim them. At that moment, a singular episode in the history of the Americas and the Great Epic of the Dominican people culminated.

In the years following the capitulation of the Spanish forces, Adón continued to be a soldier of the country. He was Commander of Weapons of Santo Domingo and in the government of José María Cabral, he served as Minister of War. When Buenaventura Báez returned to the presidency of the Dominican Republic in 1868, he went into exile to join with Luperón, Cabral and Pedro Antonio Pimentel to fight with them the project of annexation to the United States. He was then 68 years old. His age did not prevent him from being the head of the expeditionary vanguard, which entered the national territory from the south to confront the Báez government supported by the United States. A man of republican convictions, he was always the first to face danger. At that time, residing in Haiti, they made a portrait that has served as an illustration in different publications. Tall, with dark skin, serene and firm gaze, wide-brimmed hat, plywood rifle, cockerel saber on his belt, high mid-calf boots, braids and cape; He is an authentic Creole man, a typical Dominican guerrilla, perhaps seventy years old, on whom time, despite his sacrificial existence, seems to have had no effect.

Marcos Adón died, exiled, poor and alone, in the Haitian town Jacmel, on October 22, 1872, when the last stage of the Six Years' War was being fought. He was 72 years old.

== Historiagraphy ==
Like other Dominican heroes, he did not leave any fortune, farms, or assets of his own or taken from the State's assets. He honored the military uniform and his example also honors, and dignifies, the history of the Dominican people.

== See also ==
- Pedro Santana
- Gregorio Luperón
- José María Cabral
- La Victoria
