= Juan Suero =

Dominican military commander (1808–1864)

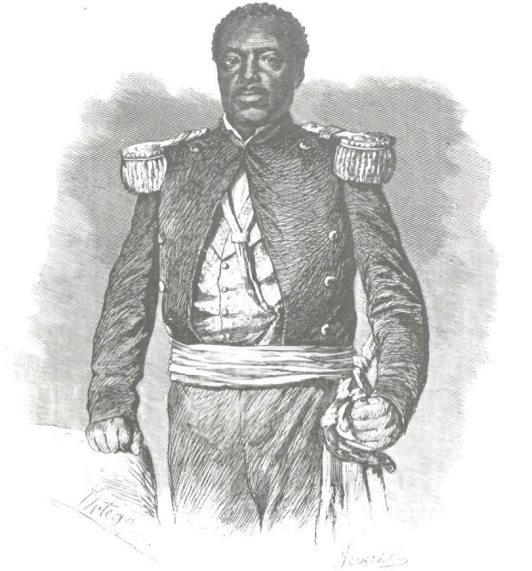
- 1862 Portrait of General Juan Suero
- Born: Juan Ceferino Suero Carmona; 1808; San Cristóbal, Captaincy General of Santo Domingo
- Died: March 19, 1864 (aged 56); Santiago, Dominican Republic
- Military career
- Allegiance: Dominican Republic; Spain
- Branch: Dominican Army; Spanish Army
- Service years: 1838–1864
- Rank: General
- Nickname: Black Cid
- Conflicts: Dominican War of Independence; Cibaeño Revolution; Dominican Restoration War

Juan Ceferino Suero y Carmona (1808 – March 19, 1864) also known by his nickname, Black Cid, was a Dominican military commander who fought in the Dominican War of Independence. He later fought, however, in the service of Spain, in the Dominican Restoration War, in which he died after receiving a bullet wound during the Battle of Paso del Muerto, on March 19, 1864.

== Early years ==
Born in 1808, he was a native of San Cristóbal, and was the son of Ceferino Suero and María Josefa Carmona (la Rubia). Both of his parents were of African descent. He was raised by the religious Father Jesús Fabián Ayala García, who had participated in the War of the Reconquista and had been the parish priest of that town since 1820. During the Haitian regime of Santo Domingo, Suero refused to join military service, he instead chose to move to Cibao.

== Military career ==
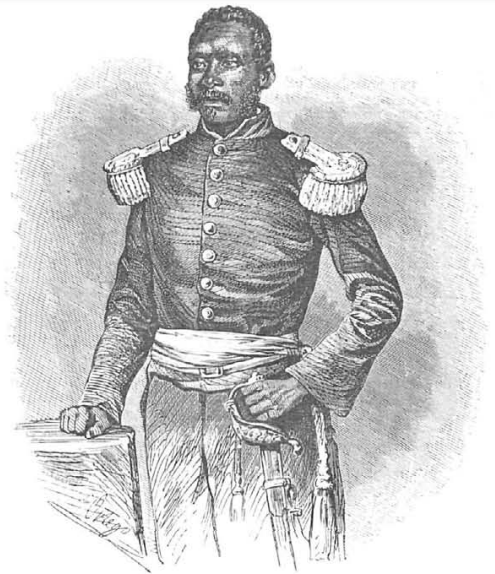
Suero in his youth c. 1840s–1850s

During the Dominican War of Independence, he commanded a battalion at the Battle of Sabana Larga (January 24, 1856) against the invading troops of Haitian Emperor Faustin I.

When the Cibaeño Revolution began to depose Buenaventura Báez from the presidency of the Dominican Republic, he acted under the orders of General Matías Ramón Mella in the eviction of Parmentier from the Samaná fortification, and was promoted to brigadier general at the end of the campaign. Shortly afterward, he acquired a farm in Los Llanos de Pérez that he dedicated to the cultivation of sugarcane.

When the annexation to Spain was proclaimed on March 18, 1861, he was military chief of Moca and when an armed uprising against Pedro Santana and the Spanish took place in that town, Suero introduced himself in disguise among the mutineers and managed to dominate the situation. Months later he moved to the Puerto Plata command.

As a consequence of the uprisings in Santiago and Guayubín in February 1863, which would escalate into the Dominican Restoration War, he accompanied the Spanish brigadier Manuel Buceta as he passed through Monte Cristi, but a few days later he returned to his position because his presence on the Line was not necessary. After the Grito del Capotillo on August 16, Suero and the Peninsular colonel Cappa left Puerto Plata to reinforce the garrison of Santiago, surrounded by Dominican patriots, making their way to the San Luis Fortress. The restorers reacted energetically and the Spaniards left the plaza heading to Puerto Plata, where Suero remained for a month confronting the insurgents in the surrounding cantons. He then embarked for Santo Domingo in order to join the Guanuma camp. Being military chief of the San Antonio de Guerra post, he went out to reconnoitre his jurisdiction, and upon reaching the crossing of the Yabacao River, a bloody scuffle broke out between his forces and those of one of the restoration leaders, Gregorio Luperón, without any of them of both sides emerging victorious. He finished the heat of combat and while he was discussing the encounter with his officers, a bullet seriously wounded him.

== Death ==
He died on March 19, 1864. General Juan Suero died before the end of the war, which is why he did not accompany Máximo Gómez and Eusebio Puello, who were evacuated to Cuba at the end of the war along with the military units they served. Some of these soldiers, like the latter, continued to serve the interest of Spain. While others, like the former, joined the ranks of the "Mambises" who had waged the Ten Years' War against the Spanish. They were excellent warriors trained on the Dominican battlefields.

== Historiagraphy ==
Serum, (despite later joining the royalist forces), was one of the many prominent black leaders during the Dominican War of independence. A Dominican of dark complexion, he was described as "tall, stocky, arrogant, gallant and very nice. He used an expansive, although poorly chosen, language. Neat in dress, he loaded himself with rings and gold chains... The watch pendant had the masonic sign of the campaś and the square..." Manifestations all of the urbanized Creole type and passed through the crucible of leadership, who did not lose never the respect of the compadrazgo, he had the cult of friendship, made the pledged word a formal commitment, and believed in honor and recognized the need to maintain the formulas that was inherited.

Spanish General José de la Gándara once said of him:

"I have never doubted the existence of our Cid Campeador, since I met that Black Cid of Hispaniola that we called General Suero, I think that can happen to our annals with the form legendary that illustrates the memory of the conqueror from Valencia. I have known few men so intrepid, so determined, so snobbish, so truly brave like him. I admired seeing him smile, calm, unalterable in the middle of the danger...."

.

== See also ==
- Battle of Sabana Larga
- Dominican Restoration War
- Eusebio Puello
- Máximo Gomez

== Bibliography ==
- Martínez, Rufino: Dominican Biographical-Historical Dictionary, 1821-1930, Santo Domingo, Autonomous University of Santo Domingo Archived May 18, 2014 at the Wayback Machine, 1971.
