= List of shipwrecks in September 1876 =

The list of shipwrecks in September 1876 includes ships sunk, foundered, grounded, or otherwise lost during September 1876.

== 1 September ==
List of shipwrecks: 1 September 1876
Ship	State	Description
Ann Pritchard	United Kingdom	The smack sank at Liverpool, Lancashire.
Ricardo	Austria-Hungary	The barque was abandoned in the Atlantic Ocean. Her crew were rescued by the steamship Rosain (Spain). Ricardo was on a voyage from Hull, Yorkshire, United Kingdom to Galaţi, Ottoman Empire.
Rosa	United Kingdom	The barque ran aground on the Little Burbo Bank, in Liverpool Bay. She was on a voyage from Quebec City, Canada to Birkenhead, Cheshire. She was refloated and taken in to Birkenhead.
Stirlingshire	Norway	The barque was abandoned in the North Sea off Terschelling, Friesland, Netherlands. Her crew were rescued by a German schooner.
Unnamed	Germany	The barque ran aground at the mouth of the River Mersey. She was refloated.
Unnamed	Flag unknown	The full-rigged ship was driven ashore at Dunegenss, Kent, United Kingdom. She was refloated and taken in tow.

== 2 September ==
List of shipwrecks: 2 September 1876
Ship	State	Description
Augusta Ross	United Kingdom	The steamship sprang a leak and foundered in the North Sea off St. Abb's Head, Berwickshire. Her crew were rescued by the steamship Malleable (United Kingdom). Augusta Ross was on a voyage from the River Wear to Inverness.
Augustine	France	The ship was wrecked on the Gauthier Rock, off the coast of Manche. Her crew were rescued. She was on a voyage from Cardiff, Glamorgan, United Kingdom to Granville, Manche.
Aurora	United Kingdom	The brigantine ran aground on the West Hoyle Bank, in Liverpool Bay. She was on a voyage from Quebec City, Canada to Liverpool, Lancashire.
Engelina	Netherlands	The brig sank in a hurricane at Buenos Aires, Argentina.
Merwede	Netherlands	The barque was driven ashore and wrecked on Vlieland, Friesland. She was on a voyage from Riga, Russia to Dordrecht, South Holland.
St. Roch	France	The lugger was driven ashore at Dunkirk, Nord and was abandoned by her crew.
Teviotdale	United Kingdom	The ship was sighted in the Atlantic Ocean whilst on a voyage from Dundee, Forfarshire to Bombay, India. No further trace, presumed foundered with the loss of all hands.

== 3 September ==
List of shipwrecks: 3 September 1876
Ship	State	Description
Andrea	Norway	The barque was wrecked at Lemvig, Denmark. Her crew were rescued. She was on a voyage from Bordeaux, Gironde, France to Copenhagen, Denmark.
Chimborazo	United Kingdom	The brig ran aground at Great Yarmouth, Norfolk. She was on a voyage from Kotka, Grand Duchy of Finland to Great Yarmouth. She was refloated.
Long Ditton	United Kingdom	The steamship was in collision with the steamship Amaryllis (United Kingdom) at South Shields, County Durham and was severely damaged at the bows. She was placed under repair.
Mistletoe	United Kingdom	The schooner ran aground on the Cabodello Rock, off Lisbon, Portugal. She was on a voyage from Livorno, Italy to Lisbon. She was refloated with assistance.
Rügenwalde	Germany	The steamship ran aground off Gotland, Sweden. She was refloated and put in to Bolderāja, Russia.
Sonora, and Vivar	United States; Spain	The full-rigged ship Sonora collided with the steamship Vivar and both vessels sank in the Irish Sea off Holyhead, Anglesey, United Kingdom Sonora was under tow of the tug Blazer (United Kingdom) at the time. Vivar attempted to pass between the two vessels, being unaware that Sonora was under tow. She sank very quickly with the loss of a crew member, survivors getting aboard Sonora. All on board that ship were rescued by Blazer. Sonora was on a voyage from San Francisco, California, United States to Liverpool, Lancashire, United Kingdom. Vivar was on a voyage from Liverpool to Santander.

== 4 September ==
List of shipwrecks: 4 September 1876
Ship	State	Description
Aristides	Germany	The schooner was driven ashore at Broughty Ferry, Forfarshire, United Kingdom. She was on a voyage from Bremen to Dundee, Forfarshire, or from Drammen, Norway to Perth, United Kingdom. She was refloated with assistance from the tug Flying Scotsman (United Kingdom) and towed in to Broughty Ferry in a waterlogged condition.
Catha	United Kingdom	The fishing boat was driven ashore and wrecked at Beer, Devon.
Croft	United Kingdom	The steamship ran aground at "Sondre Ross", south of Drøbak, Norway and sank. She was on a voyage from Newcastle upon Tyne, Northumberland, to Kronstadt, Russia. She was refloated on 6 September and towed in to Copenhagen, Denmark.
Emerald	United Kingdom	The brigantine was driven ashore and wrecked at Broughty Ferry. Her crew took to a boat, from where they were rescued by the Dundee Lifeboat English Mechanic ( Royal National Lifeboat Institution). Emerald was on a voyage from London to Dundee.
Garland	United Kingdom	The schooner collided with a number of punts and was beached at Aberdeen.
Macedonia	United Kingdom	The ship was abandoned off Peterhead, Aberdeenshire. Her crew were rescued by the Peterhead Lifeboat. She was on a voyage from Hvannasund, Faroe Islands to Peterhead.
Magdalena Bund	Germany	The ship was driven ashore in St Andrews Bay. She was on a voyage from Windau to Bo'ness, Lothian, United Kingdom. She was refloated with assistance from the steamship May (United Kingdom) and towed in to Dundee.
Maria	United Kingdom	The schooner was driven ashore in Bridlington Bay.
Robert Stevenson	United Kingdom	The ship was abandoned off Peterhead. Her crew were rescued by the Peterhead Lifeboat.
Rochelais	France	The lugger was wrecked on the Pères Rocks, on the coast of Loire-Inférieure. She was on a voyage from the Île d'Yeu, Vendée to Pornic, Loire-Inférieure.
Sarpedon	United Kingdom	The steamship collided with the steamship Julia David (Belgium) and foundered 70 to 80 nautical miles (130 to 150 km) south south west of Ouessant, Finistère, France. All 84 people on board were rescued by the steamship Calderon (Spain). Sarpedon was on a voyage from Shanghai, China to London.
St. Clair	United Kingdom	The schooner was driven ashore at Point Law, Aberdeenshire.
Vesta	Norway	The schooner was driven ashore at Broughty Ferry. Her crew were rescued by the Dundee Lifeboat English Mechanic ( Royal National Lifeboat Institution).
Wilhelmine	Denmark	The schooner was driven ashore on Læsø. She was on a voyage from Ipswich, Suffolk, United Kingdom to Bandholm. She was refloated and taken in to Copenhagen.

== 5 September ==
List of shipwrecks: 5 September 1876
Ship	State	Description
Alice M	United Kingdom	The ship departed from Saint John, New Brunswick, Canada for Dundalk, County Louth. No further trace, posted missing.
Anna Olga	Russia	The barque was driven ashore at Terneuzen, Zeeland, Netherlands. She was refloated with tha ssistance of two tugs and towed in to Terneuzen in a leaky condition.
Ernst	Germany	The brig was abandoned at sea. She was on a voyage from Leith, Lothian, United Kingdom to Memel. She was towed in to Arendal, Norway in a sinking condition.
Fremad	Norway	The brig ran aground at Wells-next-the-Sea, Norfolk, United Kingdom. She was on a voyage from Marseille, Bouches-du-Rhône, France to Wells-next-the-Sea.
Lidia	Italy	The steamship was run into by the steamship General Paoli (France) and sank in the Mediterranean Sea 3 nautical miles (5.6 km) off Livorno. All fourteen people on board were rescued by General Paoli.
Rio	United Kingdom	The brig was abandoned in the English Channel off Cape La Hougue, Seine-Inférieure, France. Her crew were rescued by the schooner Juan ( (United Kingdom of Great Britain and Ireland) Guernsey). Rio was on a voyage from Guernsey to London.

== 6 September ==
List of shipwrecks: 6 September 1876
Ship	State	Description
Glenola	Canada	The barque was driven ashore at "Cocaigne", Newfoundland Colony. She was later refloated.
Ladne	United Kingdom	The steamship was wrecked near "Capofedo", Italy.

== 7 September ==
List of shipwrecks: 7 September 1876
Ship	State	Description
Archimedes	United Kingdom	The brig collided with the full-rigged ship Fawn (United States) and sank off Ramsgate, Kent. Her crew were rescued. She was on a voyage from Grimsby, Lincolnshire to Barcelona, Spain.
Clyde, Garibaldi, Ocean Queen, and Young Alonzo	United Kingdom	The luggers were run into by the steamship Cleanthes (United Kingdom) at Grimsby. Young Alonzo sank, the others were damaged.
Unnamed	Flag unknown	The ship, a brig or a schooner, foundered in the English Channel 4 nautical miles (7.4 km) off Beachy Head Lighthouse, Sussex, United Kingdom.

== 8 September ==
List of shipwrecks: 8 September 1876
Ship	State	Description
Active	United Kingdom	The schooner was holed by her anchor and sank at Penarth, Glamorgan.
Brunette	United Kingdom	The steamship was damaged by an onboard explosion 20 nautical miles (37 km) off Lundy Island, Devon. She was on a voyage from Cardiff, Glamorgan to Boulogne, Pas-de-Calais, France. She put back to the Mumbles, Glamorgan.
Emily	Norway	The brig sprang a leak off the Orkney Islands, United Kingdom. She was on a voyage from "Veisen" to Dundee, Forfarshire, United Kingdom. She was towed in to Dundee in a waterlogged condition.
Look Out	United Kingdom	The schooner sprang a leak and foundered in the Bay of Biscay 90 nautical miles (170 km) off the Corduan Lighthouse, Gironde, France. Her crew were rescued by French fishermen. She was on a voyage from Bilbao, Spain to Newport, Monmouthshire.
Merchant	United Kingdom	The brig was driven ashore at "Nasby", on the east coast of Öland, Sweden. She was on a voyage from Riga, Russia to Newhaven, Sussex. She was refloated on 16 September and resumed her voyage.
Victoria	United Kingdom	The fishing boat was wrecked on the Barber Sand, in the North Sea of the coast of Norfolk. Her crew were rescued.

== 9 September ==
List of shipwrecks: 9 September 1876
Ship	State	Description
Agir	United Kingdom	The schooner was wrecked on Anholt, Denmark. Her crew were rescued by the barque Triton (Norway). Agir was on a voyage from London to Riga, Russia.
Elizabeth	United Kingdom	The schooner was driven into the wreck of Monrovia (United Kingdom) off the coast of Sierral Leone. She capsized and sank with the loss of three lives.
Emilia	Italy	The brig was driven ashore at "Giorja", Sicily. Her crew survived. She was on a voyage from Messina, Sicily to Rotterdam, South Holland, Netherlands.
Twilight	United Kingdom	The ship ran aground on the Pluckington Bank, in Liverpool Bay. She was on a voyage from Bombay, India to Liverpool, Lancashire. She was refloated.

== 10 September ==
List of shipwrecks: 10 September 1876
Ship	State	Description
Ada W. Gould	United States	The schooner was abandoned in the Atlantic Ocean. Her crew were rescued by the barque Golden State (United Kingdom).
Cherokee	Germany	The brig was driven ashore at Memel.
Dijlet	Flag unknown	The ship was holed and sank at "Bagdadich", Persia.
Hengist	Sweden	The brigantine was driven ashore and wrecked near Landsort. She was on a voyage from Härnösand to Lübeck, Germany.
Pacific	United Kingdom	The ship was driven ashore and wrecked on Langlade Island. Her crew were rescued.
Richard Cowell	United Kingdom	The barque was destroyed by fire off Penarth, Glamorgan. She was on a voyage from Cardiff, Glamorgan to Bermuda.
Sandviken	Sweden	The steamship sank off Porkkalanniemi, Grand Duchy of Finland.

== 11 September ==
List of shipwrecks: 11 September 1876
Ship	State	Description
Albatross	United States	The schooner was wrecked on the coast of the Newfoundland Colony with the loss of all but two of her crew.
Allegonda	Italy	The ship departed from Cardiff, Glamorgan, United Kingdom for Messina, Sicily. No further trace, reported missing.
Athlete	United Kingdom	The steamship sank at Birkenhead, Cheshire. She was refloated on 14 September.
Dandenong	Victoria	The steamship suffered the breakage of her propeller shaft and developed a severe leak. She foundered in Jervis Bay with the loss of 60 of the 81 people on board. Dandenong was on a voyage from Melbourne to Sydney, New South Wales.
Dunsandle	United Kingdom	The barque was partly abandoned in the Atlantic Ocean. Four crew were taken off by the fishing smack Sibyl ( Canada). The rest of rer crew were rescued the next day by the brigantine Belle Star ( Canada). Dunsandle was on a voyage from Quebec City, Canada to Grangemouth, Stirlingshire.
Flora	Germany	The barque was driven ashore on Læsø, Denmark. She was on a voyage from Granton, Lothian, United Kingdom to Pillau. She floated off but consequently foundered. Her crew were rescued.
Grasmere	United Kingdom	The steamship was run into by the steamship Charles Goddard (United Kingdom) and sank off Cardif, Glamorgan.
I'll Try	United Kingdom	The brig ran aground on the Kaartal Reef, in the Baltic Sea. She was on a voyage from Kronstadt, Russia to Copenhagen, Denmark. She was refloated with the assistance of a steamship and towed in to Kronstadt.
Saint James	United Kingdom	The ship was driven ashore and severely damaged at Elephant Point, Burma. She was on a voyage from Akyab to Rangoon. Saint James was refloated and taken in to Rangoon in a leaky condition. She was condemned.
Theseus	United Kingdom	The barque was wrecked in the Loochoo Islands with the loss of ten of her crew. She was on a voyage from Manila, Spanish East Indies to Yokohama, Japan.
483	Russia	The lighter sank at Kronstadt.

== 12 September ==
List of shipwrecks: 12 September 1876
Ship	State	Description
Acors Barnes	United States	The 296-ton whaler, a barque, was abandoned in the ice in the Beaufort Sea northeast of Point Barrow, Department of Alaska. A gale later struck the area and washed the abandoned Acors Barnes ashore, where the local inhabitants burned her wreck.
Camilla	United States	The 328-ton whaler, a barque, was abandoned in the ice in the Beaufort Sea northeast of Point Barrow, Department of Alaska.
Cornelius Howland	United States	The 333-ton whaler, a barque, was abandoned in the ice in the Beaufort Sea northeast of Point Barrow, Department of Alaska.
Desmond	United States	The 301-ton whaler, a barque, was abandoned in the ice in the Beaufort Sea northeast of Point Barrow, Department of Alaska.
Elizabeth	Norway	The schooner was driven ashore in the Gironde. She was refloated with the assistance of a tug and put back to Bordeaux, Gironde.
Emma Jane	United Kingdom	The schooner was driven ashore and wrecked at Padstow, Cornwall. Her crew were rescued. She was on a voyage from Newport, Monmouthshire to Padstow.
George Latimer	United States	1876 San Felipe hurricane: The brigantine was wrecked in a hurricane in the Yabacao River, Puerto Rico. Her crew were rescued.
James Allen	United States	The 349-ton whaler, a barque, was abandoned in the ice in the Beaufort Sea northeast of Point Barrow, Department of Alaska.
Java	United States	The 290-ton whaler, a barque, was abandoned in the ice in the Beaufort Sea northeast of Point Barrow, Department of Alaska.
Josephine	United States	The 363-ton whaler, a barque, was abandoned in the ice in the Beaufort Sea northeast of Point Barrow, Department of Alaska.
Marengo	United States	The 478-ton whaler, a barque, was abandoned in the ice in the Beaufort Sea northeast of Point Barrow, Department of Alaska.
Nettuno	Flag unknown	The ship ran aground in the Gironde. She was on a voyage from Cardiff, Glamorgan, United Kingdom to Bordeaux. She was refloated and taken in to Bordeaux in a leaky condition.
Onward	United States	The 339-ton whaler, a barque, was abandoned in the ice in the Beaufort Sea northeast of Point Barrow, Department of Alaska.
Saint George	United States	The 392-ton whaler, a barque, was abandoned in the ice in the Beaufort Sea northeast of Point Barrow, Department of Alaska.
Telegraafoer	Netherlands	The steamship collided with the steamship Minerva (United Kingdom) and sank off Fort Frederick. Telegraafoer was on a voyage from Antwerp, Belgium to Rotterdam, South Holland, Netherlands.

== 13 September ==
List of shipwrecks: 13 September 1876
Ship	State	Description
Adriana	Denmark	1876 San Felipe hurricane: The schooner was damaged in a hurricane at Saint Thomas, Virgin Islands.
Alice	United Kingdom	The ship departed from a port in New Brunswick, Canada for Dundalk, County Louth. No further trace, reported missing.
Annie Sunshire	Leeward Islands	1876 San Felipe hurricane: The boat was driven ashore in a hurricane at Saint Kitts.
Breeze	Leeward Islands	1876 San Felipe hurricane: The sloop was driven ashore in a hurricane at Saint Kitts.
Ceres	Sweden	The ship ran aground in the Sea of Åland. She was refloated and taken in to Rysten, Gräsön in a waterlogged condition.
Clifford	Canada	1876 San Felipe hurricane: The brig was driven ashore and wrecked in a hurricane at Saint Kitts.
Daniel	United Kingdom	1876 San Felipe hurricane: The ship was damaged in a hurricane at Saint Thomas.
Dolphin	Leeward Islands	1876 San Felipe hurricane: The schooner was driven ashore in a hurricane at Saint Thomas.
Emeu	(United Kingdom of Great Britain and Ireland) Trinidad	1876 San Felipe hurricane: The schooner was driven ashore in a hurricane at Saint Kitts.
Faustina	United States	The barque foundered in the Atlantic Ocean. Her crew were rescued by Emma E. Potter (United Kingdom). Faustina was on a voyage from Cardiff, Glamorgan, United Kingdom to Havana, Cuba.
Foreningen	Denmark	1876 San Felipe hurricane: The barque was damaged in a hurricane at Saint Thomas. She was on a voyage from Cardiff to Saint Thomas.
G. E. Wood	United Kingdom	The ship was driven ashore at the south point of Öland, Sweden. Her crew were rescued. She was on a voyage from Kronstadt, Russia to Rotterdam, South Holland, Netherlands. She was refloated and taken in to Copenhagen, Denmark in a leaky condition.
Hugo	Leeward Islands	1876 San Felipe hurricane: The ship was driven ashore in a hurricane at Saint Thomas.
Idella Berry	United States	1876 San Felipe hurricane: The barque was wrecked in a hurricane at Saint Thomas with the loss of all but three of those aboard. She was on a voyage from Cardiff to the Turks Islands.
Industry	United Kingdom	The ship was driven ashore 70 nautical miles (130 km) from Turku, Grand Duchy of Finland.
Lizzie	Denmark	1876 San Felipe hurricane: The schooner was damaged in a hurricane at Saint Thomas.
Lotus	Denmark	1876 San Felipe hurricane: The schooner was damaged in a hurricane at Saint Thomas.
Maid Marian	United Kingdom	The steamship ran aground on the Maplin Sand, in the North Sea off the coast of Essex. She was refloated the next day.
Marquis of Bute	United Kingdom	The ship was run into by the steamship Alexandria (United Kingdom) and sank in the Clyde with the loss of one of the four people on board.
Midas	Netherlands	1876 San Felipe hurricane: The schooner was driven ashore in a hurricane at Saint Thomas.
Ocean Bird	United Kingdom	1876 San Felipe hurricane: The sloop was damaged in a hurricane at Saint Thomas.
Petrel	Denmark	1876 San Felipe hurricane: The schooner was damaged in a hurricane at Saint Thomas.
Pehr Gustaf	Sweden	The ship was driven ashore at Östergarn, Gotland. She was on a voyage from the Nieuw Diep to Sundsvall.
Ravenspur	United Kingdom	The schooner ran aground off Goeree, Zeeland, Netherlands. She was refloated and resumed her voyage.
Romania	United Kingdom	The ship was sighted in the South Atlantic whilst on a voyage from Liverpool, Lancashire to Bombay, India. No further trace, presumed foundered with the loss of all hands.
Sarah	Netherlands	1876 San Felipe hurricane: The schooner was driven ashore in a hurricane at Saint Thomas.
Siri	United Kingdom	The ship was driven ashore on the north point of Öland. She was on a voyage from Grimsby, Lincolnshire to Gävle, Sweden.
Sleipner	Sweden	The steamship was driven ashore at Gothenburg. She was on a voyage from Gothenburg to Fredrikstad, Denmark and LiverpoolLiverpool. She was refloated and put back to Gothenburg in a leaky condition.
Tickler	Leeward Islands	1876 San Felipe hurricane: The sloop was driven ashoin in a hurricane at Saint Kitts.
Thyra	United Kingdom	1876 San Felipe hurricane: The steamship was driven ashore in a hurricane at Saint Thomas.
Veteran	United States	1876 San Felipe hurricane: The brigantine sank in a hurricane at Saint Thomas. Her crew were rescued. She was on a voyage from Paysandú, Uruguay to Rotterdam.
Vigilant	(Denmark) Danish West Indies	1876 San Felipe hurricane: The schooner sank in a hurricane at Christiansted, Virgin Islands. She was refloated in October, repaired and returned to service.

== 14 September ==
List of shipwrecks: 14 September 1876
Ship	State	Description
Adria	United Kingdom	The steamship ran aground on Meloria, Italy. She was refloated and taken in to Livorno, Italy.
Circassian	United Kingdom	The ship departed from Birkenhead, Cheshire for Rio de Janeiro, Brazil. No further trace, reported missing.
Gombatore	India	The ship was damaged by fire at London, United Kingdom.
Lady of the Isles	(United Kingdom of Great Britain and Ireland) Guernsey	The ship was driven ashore on Skagen, Denmark. She was on a voyage from Stettin, Germany to Newcastle upon Tyne, Northumberland.
Midlothian	United Kingdom	The steamship ran aground on Kraaksvaag, at the entrance to the Trondheim Fjord and was holed. She was on a voyage from Trondheim, Norway to Onega, Russia.
Oreala	United Kingdom	The schooner ran aground on Meloria. She was on a voyage from Ardrossan, Ayrshire to Livorno. She was refloated
Stratton	(United Kingdom of Great Britain and Ireland) Jersey	The brig struck the Roches Douvres, off Guernsey, Channel Islands and sank. Her crew survived. She was on a voyage from Granville, Manche, France to Jersey.

== 15 September ==
List of shipwrecks: 15 September 1876
Ship	State	Description
Aries	United Kingdom	The Thames barge collided with a steamship and sank at London.
Greyhound	United Kingdom	The schooner struck the Splongh Rock and was abandoned. Her crew were rescued. She was on a voyage from Cardiff, Glamorgan to Wexford. Greyhound was towed in to Wexford in a sinking condition by the tug Ruby (United Kingdom).
Madura	United Kingdom	The barque ran aground in the Nieuwe Diep. She was on a voyage from the Nieuwe Diep to Philadelphia, Pennsylvania, United States. She was refloated.
Margaretha Ewer	Germany	The ship collided with the steamship Stor (United Kingdom) and sank at Hamburg.
Meg Merrilees	United Kingdom	The schooner was run into by the steamship Isis and sank at Liverpool, Lancashire.
Orpheus	France	The ship was driven ashore on Öland, Sweden. She was on a voyage from Sundsvall, Sweden to Marseille, Bouches-du-Rhône. She was refloated with the assistance of a steamship and taken in to Karlskrona, Sweden in a leaky condition.
Vesper	United Kingdom	The steamship ran aground on the Scalp Bank, off Montrose, Forfarshire. She was refloated.
Westahuden	Germany	The brig was driven ashore on Læsø, Denmark. She was on a voyage from Hartlepool, County Durham to Kiel. She was refloated and put in to Fredrikshavn, Denmark.
Zodrasel	Sweden	The ship was driven ashore on Öland. She was on a voyage from Gävle to Rye, Sussex, United Kingdom.

== 16 September ==
List of shipwrecks: 16 September 1876
Ship	State	Description
Christina	Sweden	The barque collided with the steamship Egbert (United Kingdom) and sank in the English Channel off the Owers Bank with the loss of five of her nine crew. survivors were rescued by Egbert. Christina was on a voyage from Cardiff, Glamorgan, United Kingdom to Helsingborg.
Cognate Apap	United Kingdom	The barque was destroyed by fire at sea. Her crew were rescued by the barque Templar (United States). Cognate Apap was on a voyage from Tripoli, Vilayet of Tripolitania to Cardiff.
Gettysburg	United States	The fishing schooner was abandoned in the Atlantic Ocean (41°58′N 62°16′W). Her crew were rescued by the steamship Frisia (Germany).
Mary Lloyd	United Kingdom	The schooner ran aground on the Fairy Bank. She was on a voyage from Middlesbrough, Yorkshire to Porthcawl, Glamorgan. She was refloated and completed her voyage in a leaky condition.
Susannah Nor	United Kingdom	The barque was driven ashore on Saltholmen, Denmark. She was on a voyage from Newcastle upon Tyne, Northumberland to Kronstadt, Russia. She was refloated and taken in to Copenhagen, Denmark.

== 17 September ==
List of shipwrecks: 17 September 1876
Ship	State	Description
Ada Iredale	United Kingdom	The ship was sighted in the Pacific Ocean whilst on a voyage from Ardrossan, Ayrshire to San Francisco, California, United States. No further trace, presumed foundered with the loss of all hands.
Alpha	Netherlands	The brig was driven ashore at Ronehamn, Gotland, Sweden. Her crew survived. She was on a voyage from Loviisa, Grand Duchy of Finland to Svendborg, Denmark.
Beryl	United Kingdom	The ship departed from Villareal, Spain for Dublin. No further trace, presumed foundered with the loss of all eight crew.
Diogenes	Germany	The schooner ran aground off Læsø, Denmark. She was on a voyage from Bremen to Königsberg. She was refloated and resumed her voyage.
Elmira	German Empire	The schooner foundered in the Indian Ocean 30 nautical miles (56 km) east of East London, Cape Colony with the loss of all hands.
Minister von Schleinitz	Germany	The brig was driven ashore at "Hundred". She was on a voyage from Pärnu, Russia to Inverness, United Kingdom.
Rebecca Clyde	United Kingdom	1876 San Felipe hurricane: The steamship was wrecked at Ocracoke, North Carolina, United States with the loss of six or twelve lives. She was on a voyage from Charleston, South Carolina to Baltimore, Maryland.
Roberta	United Kingdom	The barque was driven ashore on Bald Head Island, North Carolina, United States and was severely damaged.
Sophia	United Kingdom	The brig was wrecked at St. Martins.
Vestalinde	Germany	The brig ran aground off Læsø
Unnamed	United States	1876 San Felipe hurricane The barge, in tow of the steamship Juniata (United States) capsized and sank in Chesapeake Bay with the loss of eight lives.

== 18 September ==
List of shipwrecks: 18 September 1876
Ship	State	Description
Alma	Sweden	The schooner was driven ashore and wrecked on Lolland, Denmark. She was on a voyage from "Lindstrom" to Haderslev, Denmark.
Canadian	United Kingdom	The steamship ran aground at Skernagher Point, near Islandmagee, County Antrim and was severely damaged. All on board were rescued. Canadian was on a voyage from Quebec City, Canada to Liverpool, Lancashire. She was refloated on 21 September and taken in to Larne, County Antrim.

== 19 September ==
List of shipwrecks: 19 September 1876
Ship	State	Description
Beryl	United Kingdom	The ship departed from Villareal, Spain for Dublin. No further trace, posted missing.
Eugenie	France	The schooner ran aground on the Norra Sanken Shoal, off Öland, Sweden. She was abandoned by her crew the next day. Eugenie was on a voyage from Rauma, Grand Duchy of Finland to Quimper, Finistère. She floated off on 21 September and was taken in to "Eckers" by the steamship Swan (Sweden).
Gem of Ramsey	(United Kingdom of Great Britain and Ireland) Isle of Man	The ship foundered in the North Sea. Her crew were rescued by the lugger Marie (France). Gem of Ramsey was on a voyage from Hamburg, Germany to South Shields, County Durham.
Ida, or Idaol de Pesth	United Kingdom	The steamship was wrecked at the Pointe de Corsen, Finistère, France. Her nineteen crew survived. She was on a voyage from Brăila, Ottoman Empire to Rotterdam, South Holland, Netherlands.
Middlesex	United States	The schooner foundered. Her nine crew were rescued by the steamship England (United Kingdom.
Roberto	United Kingdom	The ship was driven ashore and severely damaged. She was on a voyage from Wilmington, North Carolina, United States to Hull, Yorkshire.
Tay	Germany	The brig was abandoned in the North Sea. Her crew were rescued.

== 20 September ==
List of shipwrecks: 20 September 1876
Ship	State	Description
Castle Baynard	United Kingdom	The ship ran aground off Calshot Castle, Hampshire. She was on a voyage from Hartlepool, County Durham to Southampton, Hampshire. She was refloated and completed her voyage.
Challenge	United Kingdom	The ship departed from Dundalk, County Louth for Santa Catarina, Brazil. No further trace, reported missing.
Mary E. Ladd	United Kingdom	The ship ran aground at Wexford. She was on a voyage from Wexford to Sydney, Nova Scotia, Canada.
May	United Kingdom	The schooner was driven ashore at Queensferry. She was on a voyage from Charlestown, Cornwall to a Belgian port.
Mississippi	United Kingdom	The steamship was driven ashore at Karney Point, County Down. She was refloated.
Snowdrop	United Kingdom	The schooner was driven ashore at Coverack, Cornwall. She was on a voyage from Ipswich, Suffolk to São Miguel Island, Azores. She was refloated and towed in to Falmouth, Cornwall.
Wanata	United States	The schooner was abandoned in the Atlantic Ocean. Her crew were rescued by Emmeline (Spain). Wanata was on a voyage from Newport, Monmouthshire, United Kingdom to Shediac, Nova Scotia, Canada.
White Star	United Kingdom	The schooner ran aground on Wallace's Rocks, off Ballywalter, County Down.
Unnamed	United Kingdom	The barge was driven against the railway bridge at Bridgwater, Somerset and sank with the loss of two lives.

== 21 September ==
List of shipwrecks: 21 September 1876
Ship	State	Description
Amstel	Netherlands	The barque ran aground on the Pluckington Bank, in Liverpool Bay. She was on a voyage from Singapore, Straits Settlements to Liverpool, Lancashire, United Kingdom. She was refloated.
Ark	United Kingdom	The brig was driven ashore at Borkum, Germany.
Bayadere	France	The schooner was driven ashore and wrecked on the French coast with the loss of two of her crew. She was on a voyage from Rouen, Seine-Inférieure to Brest, Finistère.
Dandy Jim	(United Kingdom of Great Britain and Ireland) Tobago	The schooner was wrecked in Goldsborough Bay. Her crew survived.
Grecian	(United Kingdom of Great Britain and Ireland) Jersey	The brig was wrecked on "Byron Island", Newfoundland Colony. She was on a voyage from Quebec City, Canada to Burin, Newfoundland Colony.
James Joicey	United Kingdom	The steamship ran aground on the Harsens Bank, in the North Sea off the Dutch coast. She was on a voyage from Newcastle upon Tyne, Northumberland to the Nieuwe Diep.
James Mason	United Kingdom	The steamship ran aground on the Ooster Bank, in the North Sea off the Dutch coast. She was on a voyage from Bône, Algeria to Rotterdam, South Holland, Netherlands. She was refloated with the assistance of three tugs and found to be leaky.
Kent	United Kingdom	The ship departed from Cardiff, Glamorgan for Rio de Janeiro, Brazil. No further trace, reported missing.
Reliance	United States	The fishing schooner was lost near Canso, Nova Scotia, Canada. Her crew were rescued.
Selina	Sweden	The ship ran aground off Skagen, Denmark. Her crew were rescued. She was on a voyage from St Davids, Pembrokeshire, United Kingdom to Helsingør, Denmark. She subsequently became a wreck.

== 22 September ==
List of shipwrecks: 22 September 1876
Ship	State	Description
Albicord	United Kingdom	The ship sprang a leak and sank in St. Brides Bay. Her crew were rescued. She was on a voyage from Workington, Cumberland to Swansea, Glamorgan.
Continental	United Kingdom	The hulk was run into by the steamship Alnwick Castle at Gibraltar and was severely damaged.
Mary West	United Kingdom	The schooner was driven ashore and wrecked near Lizard Point, Cornwall. Her crew were rescued. She was on a voyage from Wells-next-the-Sea, Norfolk to Liverpool, Lancashire.
Onward	(United States) Washington Territory	The ship was wrecked on the Suwarrow Reef. Her crew survived. She was on a voyage from Utsalady to New Caledonia.

== 23 September ==
List of shipwrecks: 23 September 1876
Ship	State	Description
Elizabeth Ann	New Zealand	The 17-ton ketch was driven onto rocks on Banks Peninsula during a gale. Soon afterwards, she slipped off the rocks and sank.
Liberator	United Kingdom	The brigantine was driven ashore in Sandy Bay, County Antrim.
Matau	New Zealand	The 147-ton steamship ran aground near Westport, after loose mooring lines fouled her propeller. All on board were rescued.
Mary West	United Kingdom	The ship was driven ashore and wrecked at Blackhead, Cornwall. Her crew were rescued.
Pride of Wales	United Kingdom	The barque ran aground on the Dogger Bank, in the Irish Sea off the coast of County Wexford. She was refloated the next day.
Ugo	Austria-Hungary	The barque was driven ashore on Trouwers Island, Netherlands East Indies. She was on a voyage from Cardiff, Glamorgan, United Kingdom to China.
Wallace	United Kingdom	The ship was wrecked at Java Head, Java, Netherlands East Indies.

== 24 September ==
List of shipwrecks: 24 September 1876
Ship	State	Description
Annette Cornelia	Germany	The ship sprang a leak and was run ashore near Lemvig, Denmark. She was on a voyage from Lemvig to Memel.
Cas	France	The brig was wrecked on the Goodwin Sands, Kent, United Kingdom. She was on a voyage from a Black Sea port to Dunkirk, Nord.
Express	United Kingdom	The ship was driven ashore in Whitebay. She was on a voyage from Newport, Monmouthshire to Cork. She was refloated with the assistance of a number of tugs.
John and Mary	United Kingdom	The schooner was abandoned off the Isles of Scilly. She was subsequently driven ashore and wrecked at Cape Cornwall, Cornwall. Her crew were rescued. She was on a voyage from Swansea, Glamorgan to Poole, Dorset.
Mary Durkee	Canada	The barque was driven onto the Spit Sands, in the Bristol Channel. Her crew were rescued. She was on a voyage from Quebec City to Gloucester, United Kingdom.
Southella	United Kingdom	The steamship was driven ashore at Barsebäck, Sweden. She was on a voyage from South Shields, County Durham to Swinemünde, Germany. She was refloated on 26 September with the assistance of a steamship and was towed in to Copenhagen, Denmark.
Sunlight	United Kingdom	The ship was driven ashore in the River Avon. She was on a voyage from Liverpool, Lancashire to Bristol, Gloucestershire. She was refloated the next day and taken in to Bristol.
Terpsicorah	Denmark	The schooner ran aground on the Salvo Reef, in the Baltic Sea. She was on a voyage Gamla Carleby, Sweden to Copenhagen.

== 25 September ==
List of shipwrecks: 25 September 1876
Ship	State	Description
George Henry	United Kingdom	The schooner was driven ashore at West Cowes, Isle of Wight. She was on a voyage from Fredrikstad, Denmark to Aberdovey, Cardiganshire. She was refloated.
Gertrude	United Kingdom	The ship was driven ashore in the Magdalen Islands, Nova Scotia, Canada.
Hohenzollern	Germany	The steamship ran aground in the Weser. She was on a voyage from Bremen to South America. She was refloated and resumed her voyage.
Laura	United Kingdom	The ship was driven ashore at Gravesend, Kent. She was on a voyage from Demerara, British Guiana to London.
Ornen	Sweden	The full-rigged ship was run into by the barque Kaga (Norway) and sank in the English Channel 30 nautical miles (56 km) south of Portland, Dorset, United Kingdom. Kaga was unable to render assistance due to damage received. Her twenty crew were rescued by the schooner John Morrison (United Kingdom). Ornen was on a voyage from "Pabellon" to Leith, Lothian, United Kingdom.
Raoul	(United Kingdom of Great Britain and Ireland) Jersey	The schooner was abandoned in the North Sea 45 nautical miles (83 km) south east of Lowestoft, Suffolk. She was on a voyage from Jersey to Newcastle upon Tyne, Northumberland. Raoul was subsequently towed in to Ramsgate, Kent in a waterlogged condition.

== 26 September ==
List of shipwrecks: 26 September 1876
Ship	State	Description
Apion	United Kingdom	The yacht ran aground on the Nixen Sand, off Weymouth, Dorset.
Ionia	United Kingdom	The steamship was sighted off Dover, Kent whilst on a voyage from London for Alexandria, Egypt. Presumed foundered with the loss of all hands, wreckage from the ship washed up on the Kent coast in October.
Maxim	(Dominion of Newfoundland) Newfoundland Colony	The brigantine was driven ashore 2 nautical miles (3.7 km) north of Drogheda, County Louth, United Kingdom. Her eight crew were rescued by the Drogheda Lifeboat. She was on a voyage from Liverpool, Lancashire, United Kingdom to Saint John's.
Tintern	United Kingdom	The steamship sank at Duncannon, County Waterford. She was on a voyage from Waterford to Duncannon.
Toscoff	United Kingdom	The steamship collided with the ironclad (Beschir (Ottoman Navy) and sank in the Mediterranean Sea. Her crew were rescued by the steamship Blenheim (United Kingdom).
Uamvar	Canada	The barque was abandoned in the Atlantic Ocean. Her crew were rescued by HMS Dwarf (Royal Navy) and she was then scuttled. Uamvar was on a voyage from Newport, Monmouthshire, United Kingdom to Matanzas, Cuba.
William J. Gibson	(Dominion of Newfoundland) Newfoundland Colony	The schooner was driven ashore and wrecked at Wicklow, United Kingdom Her crew were rescued.

== 27 September ==
List of shipwrecks: 27 September 1876
Ship	State	Description
Almenum	Sweden	The brig sank off Lindesnes, Norway. Her crew survived.
Iona	United Kingdom	The steamship was sighted off Dover, Kent whilst on a voyage from the River Thames to Alexandria, Khedivate of Egypt. Subsequently foundered with the loss of all 28 crew; wreckage was discovered near Land's End, Cornwall.
Tage	France	The ship ran aground. She was on a voyage from "Tome" to Bordeaux, Gironde.
Xema	United Kingdom	The steamship ran aground in the River Avon. Her passengers were taken off by another steamship. She was on a voyage from Cork to Bristol, Gloucestershire.
Zampa	United Kingdom	The steamship was sighted in The Downs whilst on a voyage from Newcastle upon Tyne, Northumberland to Aden. No further trace, posted missing. Presumed to have foundered in the Bay of Biscay with the loss of all 26 crew.
Unnamed	United Kingdom	The steamship was run into by the royal yacht Tunis ( Royal Greek Navy) and sank off "Cape Malca", Greece. All on board were rescued.

== 28 September ==
List of shipwrecks: 28 September 1876
Ship	State	Description
Amity	United Kingdom	The ship ran aground at Richibucto, New Brunswick, Canada. She was on a voyage from Richibucto to Liverpool, Lancashire. She was refloated.
Diana	United Kingdom	The ship ran aground in the River Mersey near Liverpool and was holed. She was beached.

== 29 September ==
List of shipwrecks: 29 September 1876
Ship	State	Description
Bacalan	France	The barque was driven ashore at Pauillac, Gironde. She was on a voyage from Pica, Chile to Bordeaux, Gironde. She was refloated and completed her voyage.
Bugle	United Kingdom	The Thames barge was run into by the steamship Reiher (Germany) and sank in the River Thames at Blackwall, Middlesex.
Govan	United Kingdom	The steamship foundered in the Bay of Biscay with the loss of all hands. She was on a voyage from Ardrossan, Ayrshire to Rochefort, Charente-Inférieure.
Leonie	Canada	The schooner was wrecked at Bray, County Wicklow, United Kingdom. Her seven crew were rescued by the Kingstown Lifeboat. She was on a voyage from New Brunswick to Kingstown, County Dublin, United Kingdom.
New Unity	United Kingdom	The schooner was run into by the schooner Fruiterer (United Kingdom) and sank 5 nautical miles (9.3 km) off the Wolf Rock, Cornwall. Her five crew were rescued by Fruiterer and the schooner Hickman (United Kingdom).
Rosa Harriette	United Kingdom	The schooner ran aground on the Haisborough Sands, in the North Sea off the coast of Norfolk. She was on a voyage from South Shields, County Durham to Viana do Castelo, Portugal. She was refloated and assisted in to Great Yarmouth, Norfolk.
Tiber	United States	The fishing schooner was wrecked at Louisbourg, Nova Scotia, Canada. Crew saved.
W. H. Mitchell	United Kingdom	The ship ran aground at Wicklow. She was on a voyage from Dublin to Cape Sable Island, Nova Scotia, Canada.
Zampa	United Kingdom	The steamship was sighted off Dover, Kent whilst on a voyage from London to Port Said, Egypt. No further trace, presumed foundered with the loss of all hands.
Kingstown Lifeboat	Royal National Lifeboat Institution	The lifeboat capsized off Bray with the loss of four of the nineteen people on board - two of her crew and two survivors of the schooner Leonie ( Canada).

== 30 September ==
List of shipwrecks: 30 September 1876
Ship	State	Description
Alba C.	Italy	The barque was driven ashore at Ballytrent, County Wexford, United Kingdom. Her crew survived. She was on a voyage from Tripoli, Vilayet of Tripolitania to Liverpool, Lancashire, United Kingdom.
Duguesclin	France	The ship foundered in the Atlantic Ocean off Cape Finisterre, Spain with the loss of all but one of her crew. She was on a voyage from Havre de Grâce, Seine-Inférieure to Saint Thomas, Virgin Islands.
Ellen	United Kingdom	The dandy was driven ashore at Howth, County Dublin. Her crew were rescued. She was on a voyage from Mostyn, Flintshire to Bray, County Wicklow.
Jules Bertrand	France	The ship was driven ashore in Elbury Cove, Devon, United Kingdom. Her crew were rescued.
Lina	United Kingdom	The ship departed from Annotto Bay, Jamaica for London. No further trace, presumed foundered with the loss of all hands.
Mary Ann	United Kingdom	The brig was driven ashore and damaged at Douglas, Isle of Man. Her eight crew were rescued by rocket apparatus. She was on a voyage from Dublin to Maryport, Cumberland. She was refloated on 1 October. She departed under tow on 19 October for Whitehaven, Cumberland to be repaired there.
Mary Françoise	France	The lugger was driven ashore in Elbury Cove. Her crew were rescued. She was on a voyage from Swansea, Glamorgan, United Kingdom to Nantes, Loire-Inférieure.
Romeo	United Kingdom	The ship ran aground in the Thanlwin. She was on a voyage from London to Rangoon, Burma. She was refloated.
Scerimner	Norway	The barque foundered in the Atlantic Ocean. Her crew were rescued by the steamship Border Chieftain (United Kingdom). Scerimner was on a voyage from Lisbon, Portugal to Stavanger.
St. Marc	France	The ship was wrecked in MacDonnell Bay. All on board were rescued. She was on a voyage from Melbourne, Victoria to Sydney, New South Wales.
Strathnaver	New Zealand	The schooner foundered in Kaipara Harbour, New Zealand after being capsized by a sudden surge of the tide. One crew member drowned.

== Unknown date ==
List of shipwrecks: Unknown date in September 1876
Ship	State	Description
Ada W. Gould	United States	The schooner was abandoned in the Atlantic Ocean before 12 September.
Agathe	Norway	The ship was abandoned in the North Sea. Her crew were rescued. She was on a voyage from Burntisland, Fife, United Kingdom to Roskilde, Denmark.
Arica	Norway	The ship was driven ashore at Douglastown, New Brunswick, Canada.
Charles C. Leary	United Kingdom	The barque was wrecked on Cavite, Spanish East Indies. Her crew were rescued. She was on a voyage from Hong Kong to New York.
City of Montreal	United Kingdom	The ship was driven ashore on Green Island, Canada. She was refloated with the assistance of a steamship and resumed her voyage.
Colombo	United Kingdom	The ship was driven ashore at "Cape La Roche". She was on a voyage from Montreal, Quebec, Canada to London. She was refloated and put in to Quebec City in a leaky condition.
Fanny	United States	The ship was abandoned in the Mediterranean Sea 20 nautical miles (37 km) south of Porquerolles, Var, France. Her crew were rescued by Concezione Italy was on a voyage from Rio Elba, Italy to Philadelphia, Pennsylvania.
Florence	United Kingdom	1876 San Felipe hurricane: The brig was driven ashore and wrecked in a hurricane at Sainte-Marie, Martinique. Her crew were rescued. Her nine crew survived. She was on a voyage from Newport, Monmouthshire to Martinique.
G. B.	France	The barque was severely damaged by fire at Montevideo, Uruguay.
Gordon Castle	United Kingdom	The steamship caught fire whilst on a voyage from Japan to New York.
Grenada	United Kingdom	The ship was wrecked in the Indian Ocean with the loss of sixteen lives.
Jeanne d'Arc	France	The schooner ran aground at Sierra Leone and was wrecked. She was on a voyage form the Rio Pongas to Marseille, Bouches-du-Rhône.
Langshaw	United Kingdom	The ship was driven ashore at North Lydney, Gloucestershire. She was on a voyage from Montreal to Gloucester. She was refloated with assistance.
Liberty	United States	The ship foundered at sea. She was on a voyage from Havana, Cuba to New York.
Lord Dalhousie	Germany	The barque was driven ashore at Shediac, Nova Scotia, Canada.
Magdalena	United States	The ship was driven ashore on or before 20 September.
Maria	United Kingdom	The barque was driven ashore in the Belfast Lough. She was on a voyage from Belfast, County Antrim to Wilmington, Delaware, United States.
Maud Helen	United Kingdom	The ship was abandoned in the Atlantic Ocean. Her crew were rescued. She was on a voyage from Belfast, County Antrim to Quebec City.
Mayagnezana	Spain	The brig was wrecked at Saint John's, Newfoundland Colony with the loss of three lives. She was on a voyage from Puerto Rico to Saint John's.
Mecia	United Kingdom	The ship ran aground in the Hooghly River. She was refloated and put back to Calcutta, India.
Middlesex	United States	The steamship was abandoned in the Atlantic Ocean. Her crew were rescued. Middlesex was on a voyage from Quebec City to Leith, Lothian. She was discovered on 16 September by Ada (United Kingdom) and was set afire.
Mines de Soumah No. 4	France	The barque sprang a leak and foundered at sea before 20 September. Her crew were rescued.
Padding	United Kingdom	The barque sprang a leak and foundered in the Pacific Ocean. Her crew were rescued. She was on a voyage from "Mexillones" to a European port.
Sarah	France	The ship was driven ashore in the Faroe Islands. She floated out to sea and was subsequently taken in to Bergen, Norway in a derelict condition.
Staffa	Germany	The brig was driven ashore at Redcar, Yorkshire.
Teresa	United Kingdom	The barque was driven ashore at Cagliari, Sardinia, Italy. She was on a voyage from Alexandria, Egypt to and English port. She was refloated and resumed her voyage.
Vindomora	United Kingdom	The ship collided with Camaloff and sank in the River Thames. She was on a voyage from Patras, Greece to London. She was refloated on 10 November.
Walter M. Falt	United States	The abandoned, dismasted, and waterlogged fishing schooner was sighted on the Georges Bank. Lost with all twelve crew.
Wave	United Kingdom	The ship ran aground and sank at "Ra" on the Holstein coast before 12 September. She was refloated and repaired. She was later refloated with the assistance of a tug and taken in to Travemünde, Germany, where she arrived on 26 September.
Westlandet	Norway	The ship was wrecked at Maisí, Cuba with the loss of eight of her crew, She was on a voyage from Stavanger to New Orleans, Louisiana, United States.
Unnamed	United States	The coaster collided with Light Brigade (United Kingdom) and sank.
