= Carlos de Vargas =

Spanish military commander; 79th governor of Santo Domingo (1863–1864)

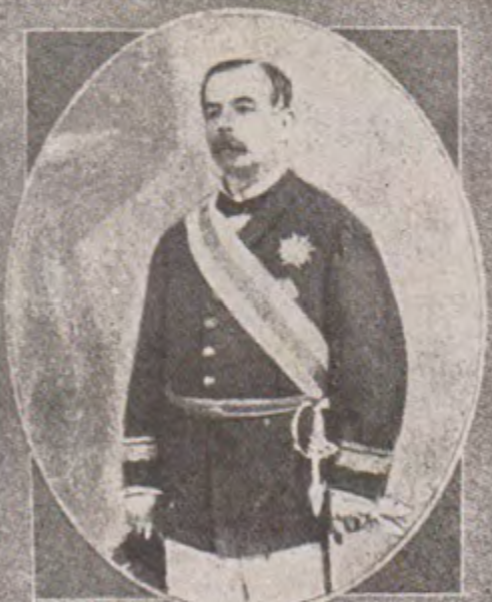
- Vargas c. 1865

Governor-General of Santo Domingo
- In office September 24, 1863 – March 31, 1864
- Preceded by: Felipe Ribero
- Succeeded by: José de la Gándara

Personal details
- Born: September 8, 1803 Ceuta, Spain
- Died: October 10, 1876 (aged 73) Madrid, Spain

Military service
- Allegiance: Spain
- Branch/service: Spanish Army
- Years of service: 1808–1867
- Rank: Field Marshal
- Battles/wars: First Carlist War; Second French intervention in Mexico; Dominican Restoration War

Carlos de Vargas y Cerveto (September 8, 1803 – October 10, 1876) was a Spanish soldier and Carlist leader. He later participated in various colonial campaigns, including serving as governor general of Santo Domingo (present-day Dominican Republic).

== Birth and early years ==
He was born on September 8, 1803 in Ceuta, Spain. A descendant of an illustrious family, he joined the Spanish Army as a cadet at the age of 5. In 1816, he was already a captain of provincial militias in Ronda and Pontevedra. During the reign of Ferdinand VII he was employed in ordinary services until 1830, when he graduated as lieutenant colonel of the garrison in the province of Segovia, moving that year to the Royal Guard, 1st Grenadiers.

In 1827, he was assigned to the Army of Observation of the Tagus, under the orders of the also Ceutí commander in chief Pedro Sarsfield. In 1830, he continued as an infantry captain, graduated as lieutenant colonel of this weapon under the orders of the Captain General of Galicia. In that destination he would be promoted to effective lieutenant colonel,[serving in the General Staff corps under the orders of General Conde de Casa Eguía. He was awarded the Cross of San Juan that same year.

== First Carlist War ==
When Ferdinand VII died, he was a major. He requested his absolute leave from the Army and went to put himself under the orders of Zumalacárregui, who assigned him to his own headquarters. He attended the battles of Heredia, Huesa, Alsasua, Muez, Olazagoitia, Artazu, Larrión, Viana, Echarri-Aranaz, Arrieta, Alegría, Doña María, Peñas de San Fausto, Ormáiztegui, Orviso, Los Arcos, Zelandieta, Arróniz, Torre Galindo, Amézcoa, Descarga, Treviño, Villafranca, Tolosa, Vergara and Ochandiano, rising to colonel for war merits and winning the laurel of San Fernando for the wound he received defending the bridge of Larraga, where he was given up for dead.

After recovering, he was put in charge of the General Staff of the 3rd Northern Division, commanded by the Count of Eguía, distinguishing himself in the siege and capture of the towns of Guetaria and Lequeitio, in the battles of Arlabán and in the action of Berrón. He also won the action of Amezagaña, where a grenade shell wounded him in the head. He was later Chief of Staff of Guipúzcoa, defeating General Sarsfield at Sarasa. He was wounded again at Antandegui and Oriamendi, and defeated General O'Donell at Andoáin, while later Vargas was wounded again at Urnieta.

In 1838, he was arrested in Mondragón, where he was held for nine months, until Don Carlos issued a decree in 1839 declaring his loyalty and courageous self-denial. While Vargas was in command of Guipúzcoa, he was charged with dismissing and arresting General Maroto, accused of collusion with the enemy, but fate decreed that the detainee was Vargas himself, who was Maroto's prisoner until after the Vergara Convention. Vargas remained in France for ten years as an emigrant, until in 1849 he took advantage of the broad amnesty granted by Isabel II to all Carlist leaders.

In 1850, he married Enriqueta Van Halen Lasquetty for the second time, after his first wife María de la Candelaria Flores had died.

== Cuba, Mexico and Dominican Republic ==
Posted to the island of Cuba in 1850, he was interim commander general of the Eastern Department of the island until 1855 and, from that date, civil governor in said department, where he served until 1860, deserving the Grand Cross of San Hermenegildo. During his ten years in Santiago de Cuba he was known as "the builder" and would later come to be considered the best colonial governor that the Eastern Department had had due to the public works he carried out: he ordered the first sidewalks to be laid in the city of Santiago, the construction of hospitals, cemeteries, barracks and the first commuter trains. According to Luis Mauricio, at the inauguration of the Príncipe Alfonso Hospital, Vargas organized military maneuvers between Santiago de Cuba and El Caney, since he thought that the Americans would take over Cuba through Guantanamo.

Today, in Santiago de Cuba, there is still a Vargas street named after him. The Cabo Cruz lighthouse, built during his government, is still known today as the Vargas lighthouse.

In 1861 he was assigned as second corporal to Puerto Rico, on commission, becoming dependent on the expeditionary division that was being formed against Mexico. Carlos de Vargas would be named second land chief, under the orders of General Prim. After the Spanish and French troops took Veracruz, Vargas was named governor until April 1862, when Prim broke the Treaty of London and ordered the return of the Spanish troops.

On May 21, 1862, Vargas was assigned to the Santo Domingo campaign (Spain having annexed Santo Domingo the previous year) as second in command of the Spanish military expedition. He participated in the actions of Sabaneta, Santiago de los Caballeros, Montecristi, Cibao, Puerto Plata and Altamira, obtaining in 1862 the sash of field marshal and the Grand Cross of Charles III.That same year, he was named Gentleman of the Chamber of His Majesty.In 1863, he was named captain general of Santo Domingo. In the Dominican Restoration War, he was successful in reconquering the province of Azúa for Spain and defeating the Dominican insurgents in San Cristóbal, Doñana, Pulgarín, Sabana-Buey and Azúa.

In 1864, Vargas ceased to be in command of Santo Domingo. The following year, in 1865, the Spanish troops were defeated and evacuated the island.

== Later years and death ==
In 1867, with Luis González Bravo in power, Vargas was named captain general of the Basque Provinces. He tried to prevent the Glorious Revolution, and after the Battle of Alcolea, he even tried to restore Isabel II to her throne, but seeing this impossible he accompanied her to the border, emigrating with her to France. There, after the abdication of Isabel II, Vargas offered his sword to Charles of Bourbon and Austria-Este, who had raised the flag of traditional monarchism.

He organized the Carlist Military Center in Madrid, which included the Count of Belascoain and the generals Arjona, Plana, Mogrovejo and Marco, Rear Admiral Viñalet and the intendant Togores, all working on the preparation of the last Carlist campaign. Vargas's ailments, wounds and advanced age did not allow him to go out on campaign again, and he died in Madrid in 1876.

== See also ==
- Dominican Restoration War
- Glorious Revolution
- Second French intervention in Mexico
