= Santo Manzanillo =

- Pitcher
- Born: December 20, 1988 (age 37); La Victoria, Santo Domingo, Dominican Republic
- Bats: Right Throws: Right
- Stats at Baseball Reference

Santo Manzanillo (born December 20, 1988) is a Dominican former professional baseball player.

Manzanillo grew up in Santo Domingo. He worked on his uncle's farm, where they grew sugar cane. When he was 16 years old, scouts for the Milwaukee Brewers approached him about trying out. Manzanillo initially declined, but was convinced to try out by his family. The scouts helped tutor Manzanillo in pitching, and after he pitched in an exhibition game, the Brewers offered Manzanillo a contract.

Manzanillo moved to Arizona in 2006 to work out at the Brewers' training facility. Though he could throw with great velocity, he had difficulty throwing strikes. Pitching for the Arizona Brewers of the Rookie-level Arizona League, Manzanillo issued 47 walks in 16 1/3 innings pitched. He worked to decrease his walk rate.

Manzanillo did not pitch in 2009 as he recovered from Tommy John surgery. In 2011, he pitched for the Brevard County Manatees of the Class A-Advanced Florida State League, and received a midseason promotion to the Huntsville Stars of the Class AA Southern League. On the season, he had a 1.75 earned run average (ERA) and 17 saves. After the season, the Brewers added him to their 40-man roster to protect him from being available to other teams in the Rule 5 Draft. His fastball could reach 100 miles per hour (160 km/h).

In November 2011, Manzanillo was involved in a traffic collision, and suffered a separated shoulder. Manzanillo returned in time for the 2012 season. However, the number of batters he walked increased. Pitching for three different minor league teams in 2012, he had a 6.95 ERA. He became a minor league free agent after the 2013 season, and re-signed with the Brewers.
