= La Victoria, Dominican Republic =

La Victoria
- Coordinates: 18°33′N 69°54′W
- Country: Dominican Republic
- Province: Santo Domingo
- Founded by: Marcos Evangelista Adón

Area
  - Total: 158.35 km^{2} (61.14 sq mi)

Population (2012)
  - Total: 312,345
  - Density: 2,000/km^{2} (5,100/sq mi)

La Victoria, founded as Santa María de la Victoria, is a small community located in the Santo Domingo Province of the Dominican Republic.

== Climate ==
Climate data for La Victoria, Dominican Republic (1961–1990)
Month	Jan	Feb	Mar	Apr	May	Jun	Jul	Aug	Sep	Oct	Nov	Dec	Year
Record high °C (°F)	36.0 (96.8)	37.0 (98.6)	37.0 (98.6)	37.0 (98.6)	38.5 (101.3)	37.2 (99.0)	38.0 (100.4)	38.0 (100.4)	39.0 (102.2)	38.0 (100.4)	37.0 (98.6)	36.5 (97.7)	39.0 (102.2)
Mean daily maximum °C (°F)	30.1 (86.2)	30.6 (87.1)	31.7 (89.1)	32.2 (90.0)	32.3 (90.1)	32.7 (90.9)	33.2 (91.8)	33.3 (91.9)	33.2 (91.8)	32.5 (90.5)	31.2 (88.2)	29.9 (85.8)	31.9 (89.4)
Mean daily minimum °C (°F)	19.0 (66.2)	18.9 (66.0)	19.5 (67.1)	20.4 (68.7)	21.6 (70.9)	22.3 (72.1)	22.5 (72.5)	22.5 (72.5)	22.3 (72.1)	21.9 (71.4)	21.1 (70.0)	19.8 (67.6)	21.0 (69.8)
Record low °C (°F)	14.0 (57.2)	14.0 (57.2)	14.0 (57.2)	15.0 (59.0)	17.0 (62.6)	18.0 (64.4)	20.0 (68.0)	18.0 (64.4)	19.0 (66.2)	19.0 (66.2)	16.0 (60.8)	12.5 (54.5)	12.5 (54.5)
Average rainfall mm (inches)	50.5 (1.99)	70.7 (2.78)	71.2 (2.80)	117.1 (4.61)	205.9 (8.11)	204.4 (8.05)	227.2 (8.94)	274.9 (10.82)	226.8 (8.93)	213.4 (8.40)	124.3 (4.89)	90.0 (3.54)	1,876.4 (73.87)
Average rainy days (≥ 1.0 mm)	7.2	6.5	7.0	7.9	13.1	13.3	15.9	15.5	14.5	14.7	10.7	9.7	136.0
Source: NOAA

== Notable people ==
- Santo Manzanillo (born 1988), Dominican former professional baseball player
