= Antonio Peláez de Campomanes =

Spanish military commander (1811–1892)

Antonio Peláez Campomanes (1811 – May 23, 1892) was a Spanish military man who was known for his participation in several conflicts. He stood out in the campaigns of Santo Domingo and Cuba. He was the nephew of the Count of Campomanes and became a division general. He was under the orders of Espartero in the First Carlist War and provided outstanding services in the General Staff.

He died in his hometown on May 23, 1892.

He is the author of the pamphlet General d'Angelo's Reply to the Gross Calumnies Contained in the Manifesto to the Nation by the Volunteers of the Island of Cuba.

== See also ==
- First Carlist War
- Dominican Restoration War
