= Jesús Fabián Ayala García =

Dominican Catholic priest (1789–1879)

Jesús Fabian Ayala y García
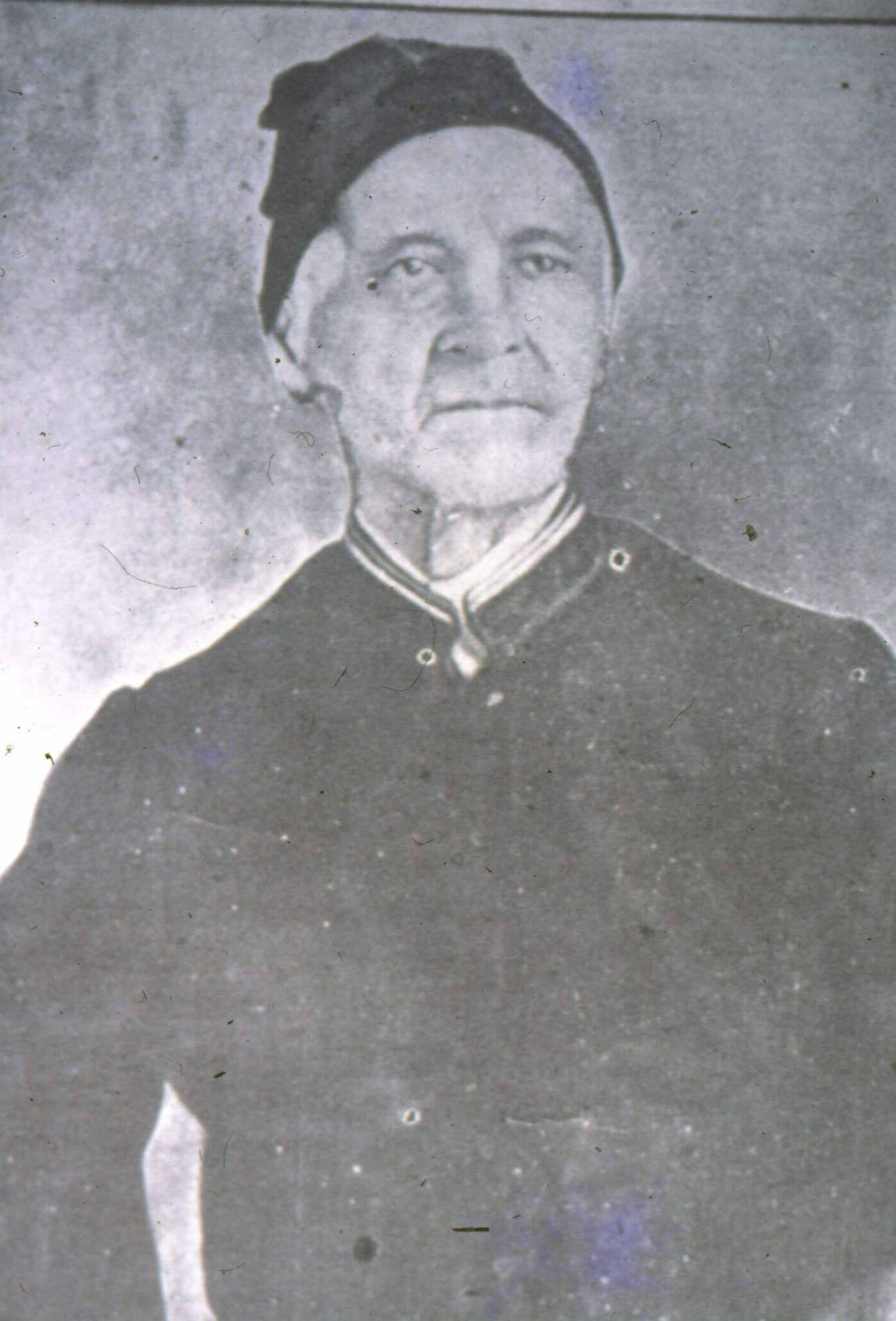
- Born: December 27, 1789; La Vega, Captaincy General of Santo Domingo
- Died: August 22, 1879 (aged 89); San Cristóbal, Dominican Republic
- Education: Saint Tomás Aquinas University
- Occupations: Religious leader, former slave and politician

Juan de Jesús Fabián Ayala y García (December 27, 1789 – August 22, 1879) also known as Father Ayala, was a Dominican Catholic priest and professor. He is considered the founder of the province of San Cristóbal, Dominican Republic.

== Biography ==
=== Early life ===
He was born on December 27, 1789, in Soto, La Vega, son of the spouses Manuel de Jesús Ayala and Ana García de Ayala, his first teachers were his parents and then Francisco Paula and Francisco Rojas.

In April 1805 he was taken along with his family and people from La Vega, as well as residents of Moca, Santiago and Cotuí to Guárico (today Cap-Haïtien) by General Jean-Jacques Dessalines, being given as a slave to a landowner. Some time later he managed to return with his family to La Vega, where he continued his studies which he continued in Santo Domingo at the Santa Clara convent as a seminarian. Health problems forced him to return to La Vega, where he served as a clergyman under the direction and protection of Father José Tavarez.

Father Ayala educated General José del Carmen Reynoso and raised and acted as a mentor to a young infant, Juan Suero, (later known in Dominican history by the nickname of the Black Cid); he collaborated in the acts in honor of Francisco del Rosario Sánchez that were celebrated in San Cristóbal, when they were taken to the Pantheon of the Fatherland in 1875.

He completed his studies at the University of Santo Tomás de Aquino, was ordained a priest at the beginning of 1815, studied civil and canon law in 1815 and 1816, and was appointed parish priest of Bayaguana in 1816.

It was he who finished building the Sanctuary of that Community and published a novena to the Holy Christ of Miracles.

In the early 19th century, Father Ayala suffered the penalties of persecution as were the settlers of Santo Domingo, was imprisoned in Haiti, when Jean-Jacques Dessalines in 1805, took hundreds of inhabitants, participated in the fight for the Reconquest in 1809. During the War of the Reconquest started by Juan Sánchez Ramírez, Juan de Jesús participated in the same, fighting in the siege of Santo Domingo, received a wound in one arm, being hospitalized in the Hospital San Nicolás de Baní, made friends with the parish priest of Santa Bárbara, Father José Ruiz, who helped him so that he receive classes of Latin and theology from Dr. Tomas Correa y Cidrón; in 1814 he entered the University of Santo Domingo, to the faculty of Humanities.

Archbishop Pedro Valera y Jiménez appointed him assistant to the Choir Chaplains of the cathedral, then he traveled to Puerto Rico to receive major orders up to the rank of subdeacon from Monsignor Juan Alejo de Arizmendi. Back in Santo Domingo he resumed his post in the choir, but some time later, helped again by Father José Ruiz, he embarked for Cuba, but the voyage was interrupted when an English privateer captured the schooner he was travelling on. Once freed, he arrived in Cuba, where he was protected by Father Dionisio de Moya y Porte, receiving the diaconate and then the presbyterate from the hands of Juan Bautista Sacristán (Archbishop of Santa Fe de Bogotá). Upon his return to Santo Domingo he celebrated his first mass in the church of Santa Bárbara, sponsored by Father José Ruiz, and dedicated himself to attending philosophy classes until 1816, when he was appointed Parish Priest of the parish of San Juan Bautista de Bayaguana, where he remained until 1820.

=== Arrival in San Cristobal ===
Since his arrival in San Cristóbal on August 16, 1820, he took possession of the parish, which was made up of several hermitages, the parish capital being the hermitage located in the sugar mill of the San Cristóbal estate, where the foundation of the city that would bear that name began. At that time, the population was scattered throughout the fields, in many of which there were wooden oratories with thatched roofs; With the abolition of slavery by the Haitian authorities, many of the inhabitants of the fields came to live in the town. Father Ayala, with the help of General Jérôme-Maximilien Borgella, acquired land, which was made available to whoever wanted to build, the land was cleared of weeds and trees by order of General Jean-Baptiste Richié, the Haitian military chief of the place, who showed Father Ayala the place where he should build the church, also serving as godfather in laying the first stone of the temple in 1828, which was blessed on October 7, 1838. He also built a home for the elderly that still existed in 1862.

In 1828, construction of the Sacred Heart of Jesus Parish began, and was completed 10 years later (1836). Inside it are buried prominent figures of the social, religious, political and cultural life of the last century, including Father Ayala himself, its builder. In a letter to Monsignor Cocchia, he says, "Carrying a stone hurt my waist and I suffered a lot all year long."

This Parish was blessed by Father Jesús Fabián Ayala, on October 6, 1838, and not on the 7th of the same month and year, as mistakenly appears in the same church, on a mahogany board. On the day of the blessing of said church, Father Juan de Jesús Ayala y García published the novena of the Patron Saint Christopher.

He dedicated himself to teaching for years. On May 7, 1842, an earthquake caused damage to the temple, and Father Ayala soon began his separation. He was elected deputy to the First Constituent Congress representing San Cristóbal. On September 21, 1844, he swore in the deputies in the church of San Cristóbal after celebrating a mass, and on November 6 of the same year he sang a Te Deum when the Constitution was proclaimed.

=== Role in the Dominican Constitution ===
Fabia was one of those who participated in the drafting of the Constitution of 1844 and was a signatory of the same for the province of San Cristóbal, in 1844.

And when giving a speech, which is still preserved, and counting on article 45 of the Constitution of the Dominican Republic, where it is stipulated that the Catholic religion is the official religion of the Dominican state, although other religious cults are permitted.

=== Social and pastoral functions ===
Father Jesús Fabián held several religious and social positions. In 1846, he was appointed Collecting Agent of San Cristóbal by the Society of Friends of the Country in 1857 he was confirmed by Pedro Santana in Jarabacoa, and Father Manuel Palet, foreign vicar of the province of La Concepción de La Vega, entrusted him with the parish of that community, where he remained until 1861. Father Ayala also exercised his ministry in the church of Santa Bárbara in Santo Domingo (from February 25 to July 7, 1842) and from December 19, 1850, to January 1, 1851), El Seybo (from January 11 to February 1, 1851), in the church of San Carlos in Santo Domingo.

As apostolic subdelegate he governed the Dominican Church from May 21 to July 4, 1866, and from September 9, 1866, to April 23, 1867; ecclesiastical governor and vicar general on August 12, 1871, when the apostolic vicar Monsignor Leopoldo Ángel Santanche de Aguasanta left for Curaçao. Fray Rocco Cocchia named him dean of the cathedral and honorary canon on December 16, 1874.

=== Death ===
He died on Friday, August 22, 1879, in San Cristóbal at eleven in the morning. His remains are buried in the Sacred Heart of Jesus Parish, located on Constitution Avenue, San Cristóbal, which was built by himself.

In memory of Father Ayala, the city council of La Vega, on May 14, 1940, designated a street in the San Antonio sector. He was Administrator of the Archdiocese of Santo Domingo and director of the Conciliar Seminary of Santo Tomás Aquino, and left written memoirs entitled " Disgraces of Santo Domingo ," where he narrates the hardships endured by several Vegans, including himself, when they were taken prisoner to Haiti, on foot in 1805, by order of Juan Jacobo Dessalines as he passed through that city.
