= Annexation of Santo Domingo =

Annexation of Santo Domingo or of the Dominican Republic may refer to:

- French annexation during the Era de Francia (1795–1815)
- Haitian occupation of Santo Domingo (1822–1844)
- Spanish annexation of the Dominican Republic (1861–1865)
- Proposed United States annexation of Santo Domingo (1869–1871)
