= Battle of Paso del Muerto =

1864 battle of the Dominican Restoration War

- Part of the Dominican Restoration War
Date	March 24, 1864
Location	Santo Domingo, Dominican Republic
Result	Spanish victory

Belligerents
Kingdom of Spain	Dominican Republic

Commanders and leaders
(Spain) Juan Suero (DOW)	(Dominican Republic) Gregorio Luperón

The Battle of Paso del Muerto (Spanish: Batalla del Paso del Muerto), also known as the Action of Paso del Muerto or the Combat of Paso del Muerto, was a skirmish during the Dominican Restoration War that took place on March 24, 1864, between Spanish forces under the command of Brigadier Juan Suero and Dominican forces commanded by General Gregorio Luperón. The engagement ended in a Spanish victory. Suero, nicknamed the Black Cid by the Spanish, was mortally wounded and died a few hours later.

== See also ==
- Dominican Restoration War
- Pedro Santana
- Juan Suero
