= Spanish annexation of the Dominican Republic =

Reintegration of Santo Domingo (1861–1865)

Province of Santo Domingo Provincia de Santo Domingo (Spanish)
- Province of Spain
- 1861–1865
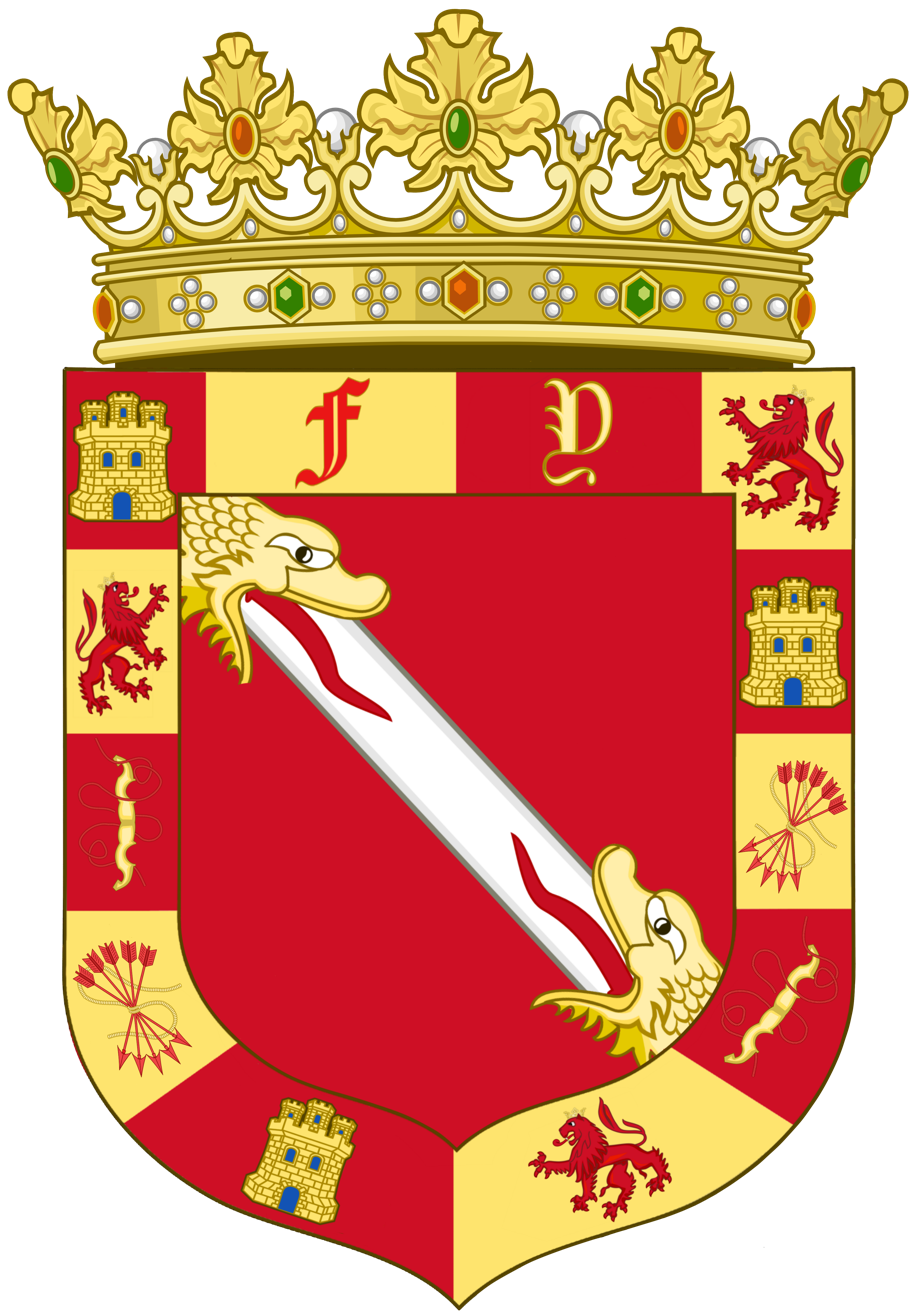
- Flag of Spain Coat of arms

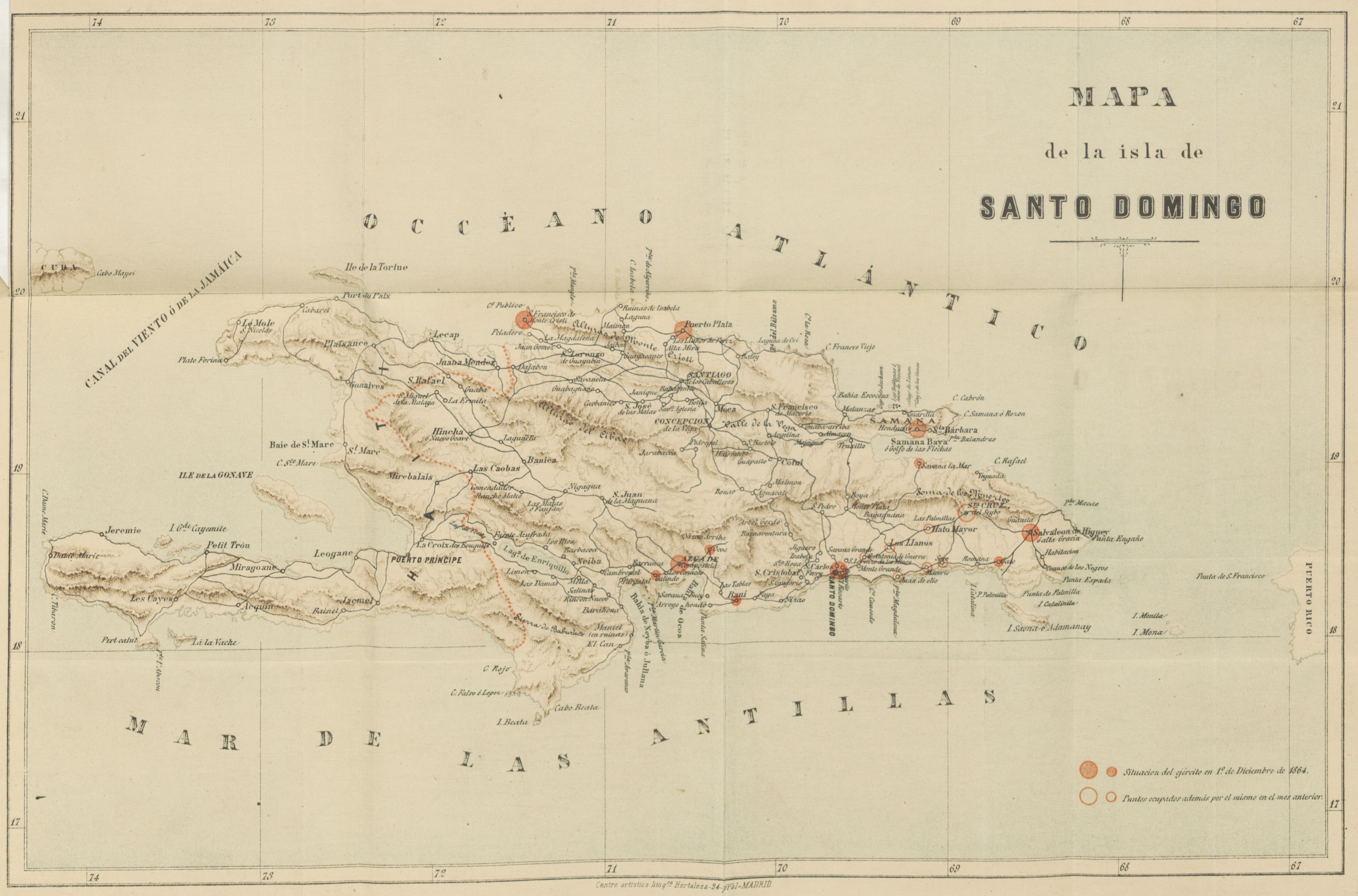
- Cities controlled by the Spanish Army by 1 December 1864 (solid red)

Anthem
- Marcha Real
- Demonym: Dominican
- Population
  - 1861: 280,000
- Government
  - Type: Captaincy General
- Queen
  - 1861–1865: Isabella II of Spain
- Governor and Captain-General
  - 1861–1862: Pedro Santana (first)
  - 1864–1865: José de la Gándara (last)
- History
  - Reincorporation proclaimed: March 18 1861
  - Evacuation of last Spanish troops: July 15 1865
Preceded by	Succeeded by
First Dominican Republic	Second Dominican Republic
- Today part of: Dominican Republic

The Annexation of the Dominican Republic to Spain (Spanish: Anexión de la República Dominicana a España) or Reintegration of Santo Domingo (Reintegración de Santo Domingo) was a four-year period between 1861 and 1865 during which the former Spanish possession of Santo Domingo in the eastern part of the island of Hispaniola, then the independent Dominican Republic, was occupied and annexed by the Spanish Empire, following the request of Dominican dictator Pedro Santana. The period coincided with the American Civil War, during which the United States was unable to enforce the Monroe Doctrine. After fighting an insurgency of two years in the Dominican Restoration War, Spain left the country in 1865. Several Dominicans who sided with Spain left for the Spanish possessions of Cuba and Puerto Rico and played a role in their later struggle for independence.

== Previous annexations ==
Spain had ruled the Dominican Republic's territory since Christopher Columbus claimed the island of Hispaniola for the Crown of Castile in 1492. In the 1795 Peace of Basel, Spain ceded the Dominican territory to France, which controlled the colony of Saint-Domingue (Haiti) on the western side of the island, but French control was ineffective until Toussaint Louverture occupied Santo Domingo in 1801. Following the Haitian victory in the Revolution and the 1804 Haitian massacre, the Criollos of Santo Domingo asked to return to Spanish rule in 1809. With Spain distracted first by the Peninsular War and then by the Spanish American wars of independence, this second period of Spanish rule (dubbed locally the España Boba, "Foolish Spain") was almost testimonial. On 1 December 1821, José Núñez de Cáceres proclaimed independence as the Republic of Spanish Haiti and asked Simón Bolívar for integration into Gran Colombia, but the country was invaded and annexed by Haiti just two months later.

The Haitians abolished slavery, banned Criollos and the Catholic Church from owning land, and redistributed it as they had done in Haiti. During the long Dominican War of Independence (1844–1856), mostly fought as an insurgency, the country was depopulated, impoverished, indebted, politically fragmented, corrupt, illiterate, and open to Haitian incursions. Starting in 1846, the two most prominent Dominican leaders, Pedro Santana and Buenaventura Báez, repeatedly offered the United Kingdom and France a protectorate or annexation as a way to repair the economy and keep their respective faction in power. Santana's powerbase were the ranchers and cowboys, and Báez's the bourgeoisie of the capital. Both shared the goal of annexation, but neither was willing to see it happening under their rival's watch. However, the British were only interested in trade and the French favored a return to Haiti because it would accelerate payments of the Haitian independence debt.

In 1853, Santana sent Matías Ramón Mella and Felipe Alfau to Spain to offer the choice between annexation and diplomatic recognition. Spain chose recognition, fearing the opposition of France, Britain, and the United States to annexation. However, the Spanish consul in Santo Domingo, Antonio María Segovia, offered any Dominicans the possibility to register as Spanish citizens. This figure, known as the Matrícula de Segovia ("Segovia's Registration"), allowed hundreds of Dominicans to acquire Spanish citizenship without leaving the country, and was used by Báez's supporters to protect themselves from Santana.

In 1854, the American filibuster William Leslie Cazneau drafted a treaty that would cede Samaná Bay to the United States for the building of a naval base, but it was rejected due to the opposition of Samaná Americans, who feared that the treaty would be followed by annexation and slavery.

In 1858, Santana overthrew president José Desiderio Valverde and sounded the idea of annexation by France or Spain again. Britain and France opposed annexation by Spain, and in 1859 discussed protectorates by Sardinia, Sweden, Denmark, Portugal, Naples, the Netherlands, Belgium, and even Haiti as alternatives. In 1860, Santana wrote a letter to queen Isabella II and sent Felipe Alfau to Spain again, proposing the annexation of Santo Domingo not as a colony but as a province of Spain with representation in the Cortes Generales. Though they met little interest at first, prime minister Leopoldo O'Donnell sent a military mission to train the Dominican Army and explore the strategic value of the country for Spain.

Communication was established between Santana and the Spanish captain-general of Cuba, Francisco Serrano, who was instructed to negotiate without moving precipitously to avoid a conflict with the United States. Spain would only consider annexation in case of clear and overwhelming support from the Dominican population. Santana promised that reintegration would be easy because of cultural ties: "Religion, language, beliefs, and customs, all we preserve with purity."

== 1861 annexation ==
=== Beginning and reactions ===
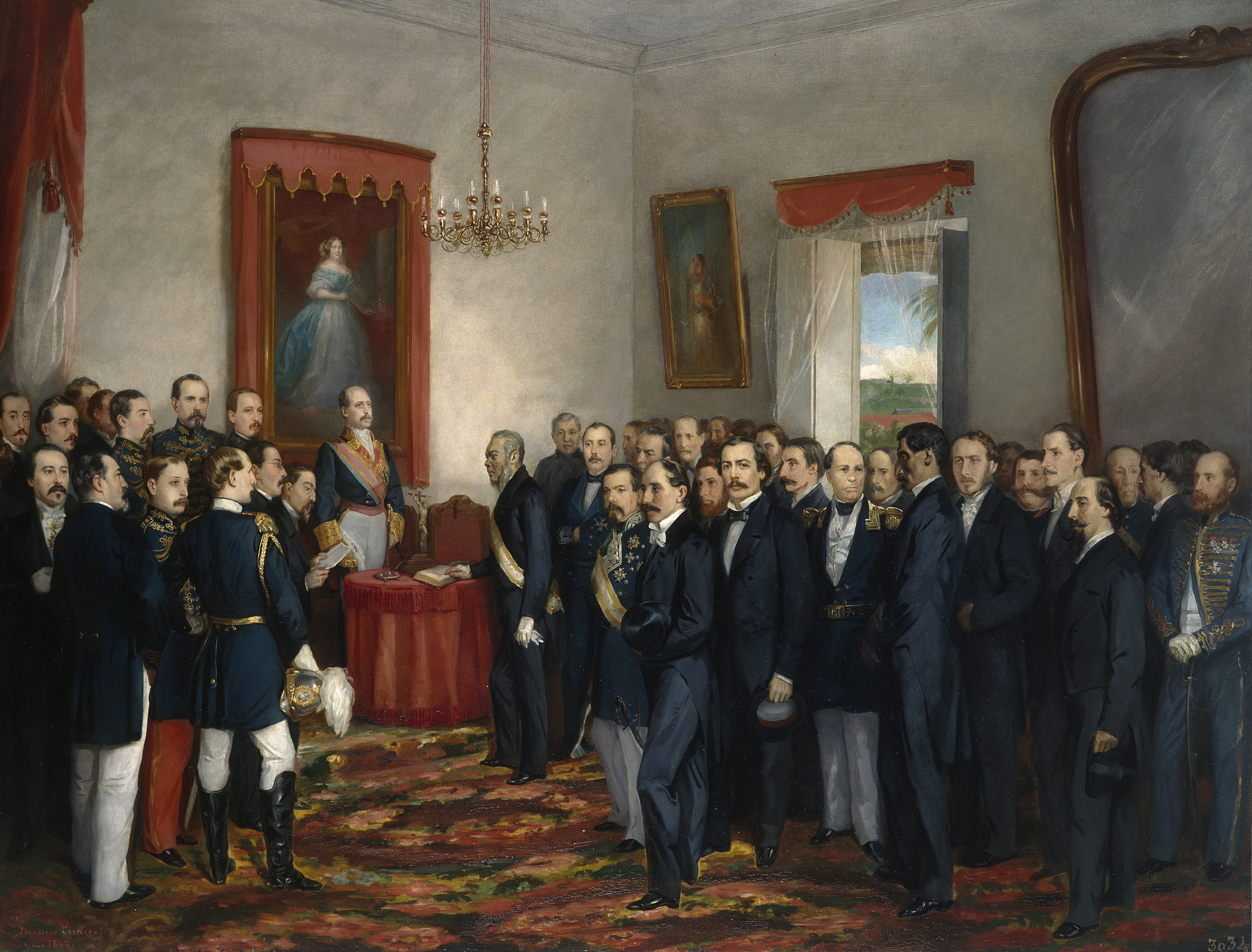
Swearing-in of Santana as governor and captain-general of Santo Domingo, before Serrano and a portrait of Isabella II. Painting by Wenceslao Cisneros.

Frustrated with Spain's cautious approach, Santana staged a plebiscite in March 1861 in which 4,000 Dominicans voted overwhelmingly for annexation (the total population of the country was 280,000). Most votes were cast by the wealthy and allies of Santana, sometimes in private homes or government facilities, and others were coerced, pushing Santana's enemies against the annexation. On 18 March, Santana announced the plebiscite's result and the immediate annexation of the Dominican Republic to Spain, claiming it the will of the Dominican people.

Serrano, O'Donnell, and Isabella II were upset by the news, feeling outmaneuvered by Santana and with little choice but to proceed with the annexation, thought its official acceptance by the queen was delayed until 19 May, when the American Civil War had begun and it was clear that the United States would not oppose the annexation by force. Secretary of State William H. Seward presented war as an option to Abraham Lincoln, but he only protested, along with some Latin American countries. Great Britain "reluctantly" acquiesced to the annexation because it would not be followed by the reinstatement of slavery, and France supported it by claiming "no menace to French interests," in a possible bid to win Spanish support towards the establishment of a French-controlled Second Mexican Empire. Haiti was the only country to threaten war, but it was unable to oppose Spain meaningfully, despite being repeatedly accused of the contrary.

The annexation terms were very generous to Santana. Dominican law and property ownership would not change, and Dominican officials and clergy would remain in their positions, effectively meaning that Spain would upheld the power of Santana's supporters. Santana himself was sworn in as Governor and Captain-General of Santo Domingo on 8 August, the same title used by Spanish colonial administrators before 1821. However, Santo Domingo would be a province of Spain, not a colony, and slavery would remain illegal despite its persistence in Cuba and Puerto Rico. Spain would also validate all actions taken by the Dominican government since 1844.

It was also agreed that Dominican paper money, devalued due to hyperinflation caused by mass printing to finance the war against Valverde and a military buildup against possible Haitian invasions, would be exchanged by Spanish currency as if they had the same value. As Spain recognized the ranks of the Dominican military as their own, Dominican officers received much higher pay and pensions than they did before the annexation. Most of them, including 57 generals, retired and were replaced by 3,000 soldiers and 2,000 sailors from Cuba and Puerto Rico under the command of Spanish general Antonio Peláez de Campomanes. With only one month before deployment to Santo Domingo, many came unprepared, with no maps, no information about the island, and no instructions about what to do upon arrival. Meanwhile, up to 20 warships cordoned the Dominican coast at the height of Spanish deployment, in order to prevent interference by Haiti, the United States, and other countries. However, this precaution turned unnecessary in the case of the United States, which kept the Union Navy out of Dominican waters and abstained from arming the resistance as to not invite Spain to recognize the Confederate States of America in retaliation.

The annexation surprised the press and public in Spain, but was welcomed as the first step in the restoration of the Spanish Empire in the Americas through annexations, alliances, or the establishment of local monarchies under members of the Spanish royal family. For Spanish abolitionists, Santo Domingo was a testing ground for the post-slavery economies of Cuba and Puerto Rico, the only parts of the Spanish Empire where slavery remained. The main supporters of the annexation in Spain were the "propertied classes, aristocrats, Catalan industrialists, urban landowners, military, and religious leaders," who believed it would revitalize Spain's image and economy, restore Catholicism in the island, and protect Cuba. In the Dominican Republic, annexation found support among some merchants, would-be industrialists, and political aspirants in the cities, but was opposed in rural areas where the population was used to a lighter presence of the national government. It was also more popular generally in the richer south than in the poorer north of the country, and among White Dominicans than Black Dominicans.

=== Early opposition ===
On 2 May 1861, colonel José Contreras attacked the barracks at Moca but was captured by Santana and executed. At the end of May and still before Spanish troops were deployed, Báez led an army from Haiti, which was repelled by Santana. In June, generals José María Cabral and Francisco del Rosario Sánchez rebelled and occupied some villages near the border with Haiti, where president Fabre Geffrard allowed them to operate and provided them with weapons. However, Santana enticed Sánchez to a trap and captured him at El Cercado, then executed him by firing squad along with twenty of his supporters. The executions were protested by Peláez.

By July, the annexationists secured control over all Dominican territory. On the 6th, six Spanish warships commanded by Joaquín Gutiérrez de Rubalcava sailed to Port-au-Prince and threatened to bomb the city unless Haiti paid 200,000 duros and saluted the Spanish flag 21 times without Spanish response. After five days and the mediation of the British consul, Haiti agreed to pay 25,000 duros and saluted the Spanish flag, then was saluted back by the Spanish. Haiti also promised to prevent further crossings of Dominican rebels and expelled Cabral and Báez from its territory.

=== Santana's relief ===
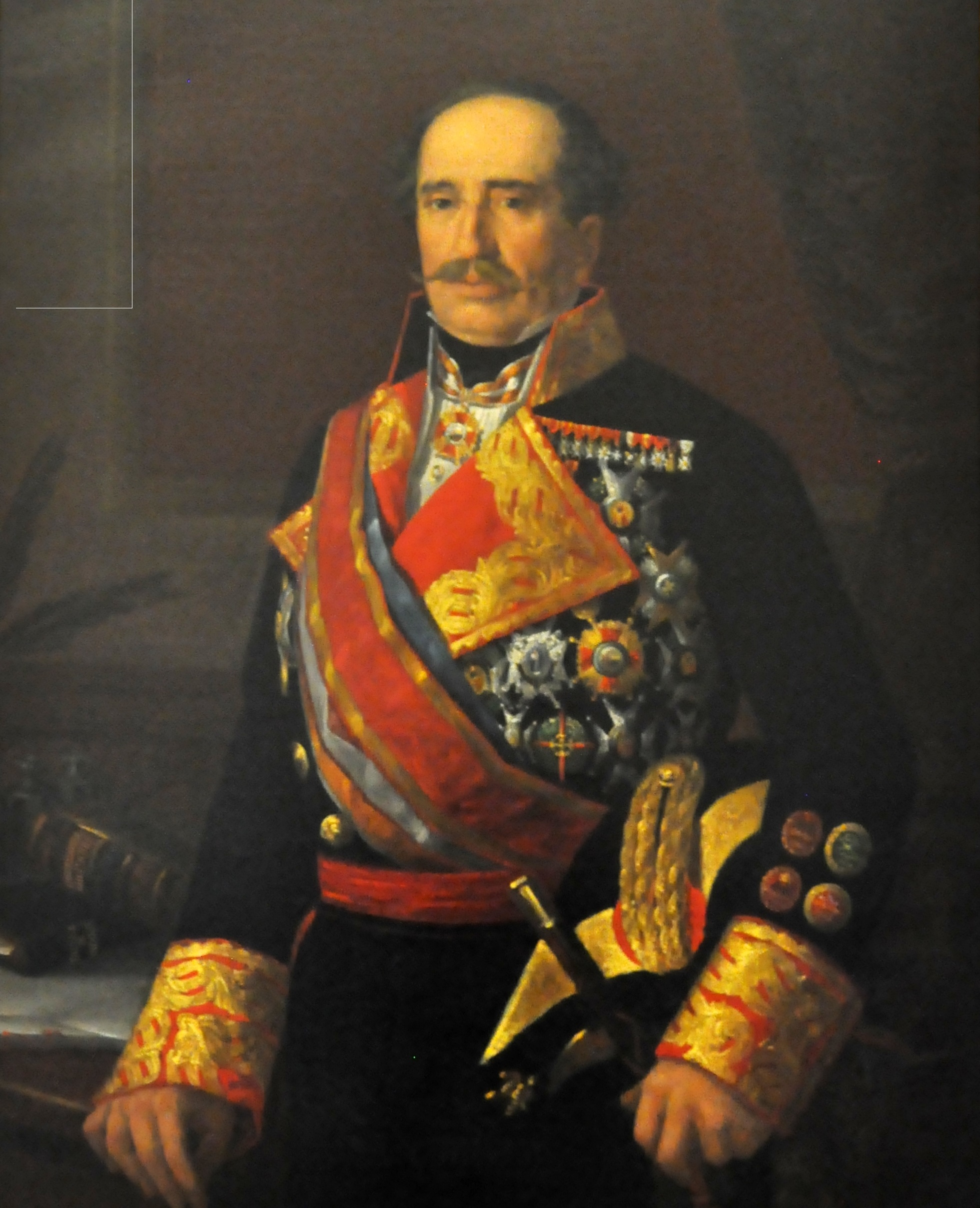
Felipe Rivero y Lemoine

At the end of the 1861 summer, Serrano visited Santo Domingo to study the situation. In a secret message to Madrid, he claimed that the country had no administration, taxing authority, justice, trade, industry, or communications. The climate was "horrible and unhealthy", and the population "ignorant and primitive". The Catholic Church was the only institution with some normality and cohesion, and Santana only wanted money and to secure his own power. Serrano requested the urgent shipment of public officials to reorganize the administration, and that Santana be called to Spain with the excuse of meeting with Queen Isabella II, who would give him a title in Castile and a seat in the Senate of Spain to keep him there, while another governor and captain-general was appointed in his place.

Spain sent engineers to study the construction of roads, railroads, mines, river channels, docks and bridges; and jurists and public officials to reorganize the Dominican administration. It was decided that the most immediate course of action should be the stimulation of cotton and tobacco agriculture, and the exact delimitation of the border with Haiti. Santana resigned as governor in January 1862, but retained the position of captain-general. In March, the Spanish official Eduardo Alonso Colmenares, assigned to reorganize justice, denounced that Santana still opposed any modernization and behaved like a dictator, breaking the law and usurping the queen's authority to give pardons. Colmenares also requested the urgent relief of Santana as captain-general.

In July, the Spanish government named Felipe Rivero y Lemoine as new captain-general, but didn't call Santana to the Iberian Peninsula. In September, Rivero made a new report confirming Serrano's conclusions and added that the country was divided between the supporters of Báez and Santana, threatening peace. Santana was still in control, naming the town mayors among his supporters, and Serrano was appointing Spaniards as town secretaries to neutralize him. Wary of losing Santana's support, the queen named him Marquess of Las Carreras and thirty of Santana's supporters received military decorations.

=== Unpopular policies ===
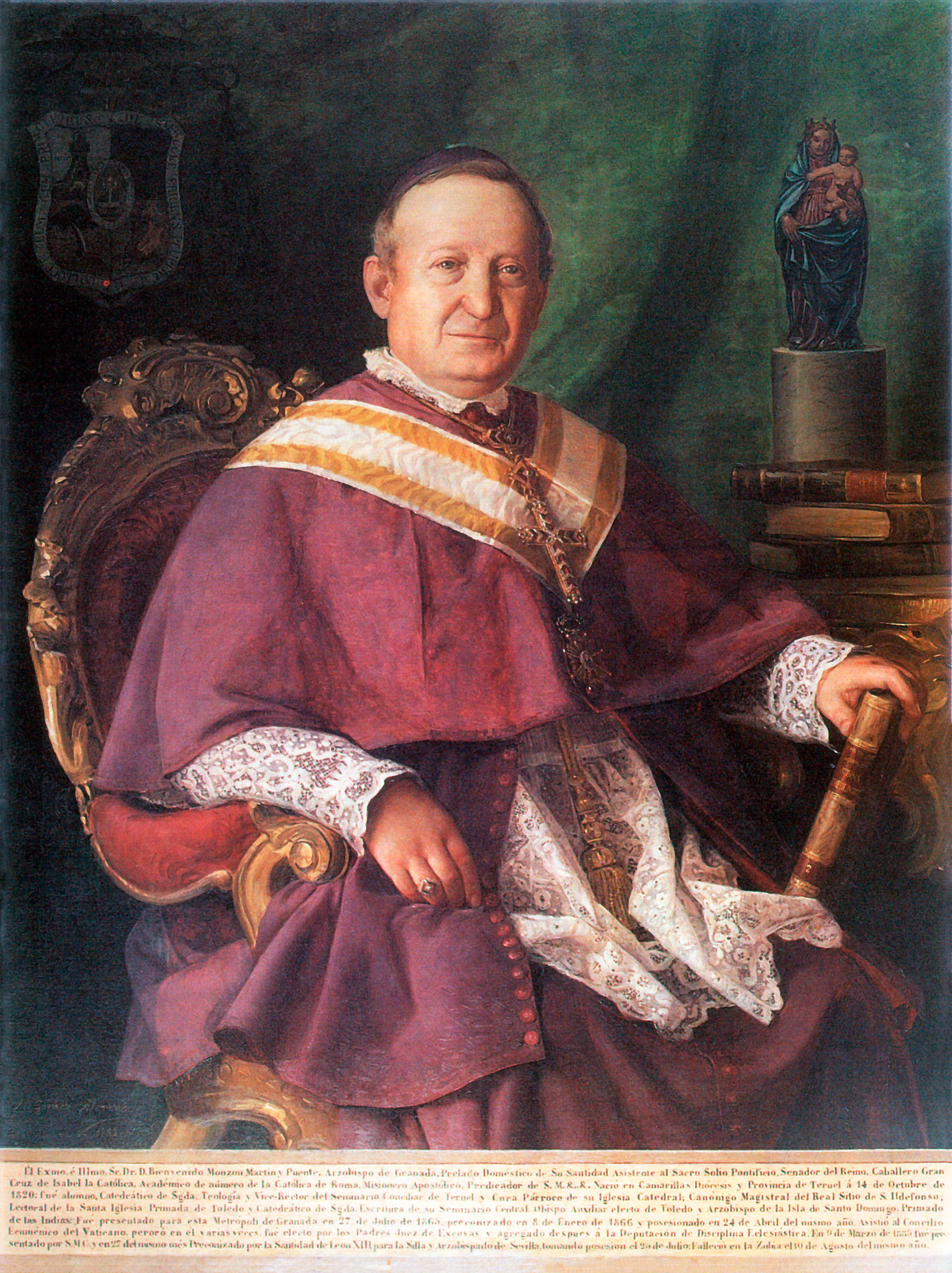
The archbishop Bienvenido Monzón y Martín-Puente

In 1862 the Spanish tried to walk around some of the annexation terms agreed with Santana for being economically unrealizable. The exchange of paper money for Spanish currency was maintained in theory, but was denied for bills that showed any small damage, causing indignation in the population. Many Dominican officers in the reserve also lost their salary and recognized rank without explanation, and were not allowed to use the Spanish uniform. Also unpopular were new taxes, press censorship effected by censors from the Iberian Peninsula, and the requisitioning of mules and horses by the military without compensation.

The trial of Manuel de Frías, a septuagenarian black farmer, became a cause célèbre. Frías, who was in his thirties when slavery was abolished in Santo Domingo, was convinced that the Spanish were planning to restore it, and agitated his compatriots to not obey or trust them or any Europeans. Many Dominicans testified in his favor, including a soldier in uniform, but Frías was sentenced to prison. However, upon his arrival in jail an unknown hand allowed him to leave through a backdoor, and he fled on horseback to never be seen again. A young man who provided the horse said he did it only because Frías was a friend of his father. From the Frías case, rumors of the reinstatement of slavery extended and took root in the northern Cibao region, despite the Spanish authorities's efforts to deny them. Anti-black racist rhetoric from the press, public officials from slaveholding Cuba and Puerto Rico, and Spanish soldiers previously posted to Cuba and used to see Black people as slaves only fueled them. Other Dominicans suspected of conspiring against Spanish rule, like the priest José Páez in the village Los Minas (today part of Santo Domingo city), disappeared in a similar manner to Frías and were believed to hide in the countryside with the help of local people.

The Catholic Church's leadership under the Spanish Archbishop Bienvenido Monzón contributed to stir up the Dominicans by denouncing both the Napoleonic-based civil marriage and the common-law marriages popular in the island, as well as Masonry, which had a strong presence in the northern cities of Puerto Plata and Samaná. The Masonic Temples were closed and their members denied communion unless they renounced Masonry and handed over their insignia. The Protestant churches built by African American immigrants from the United States were also closed and their members forced to worship in private.

== Dominican Restoration War ==
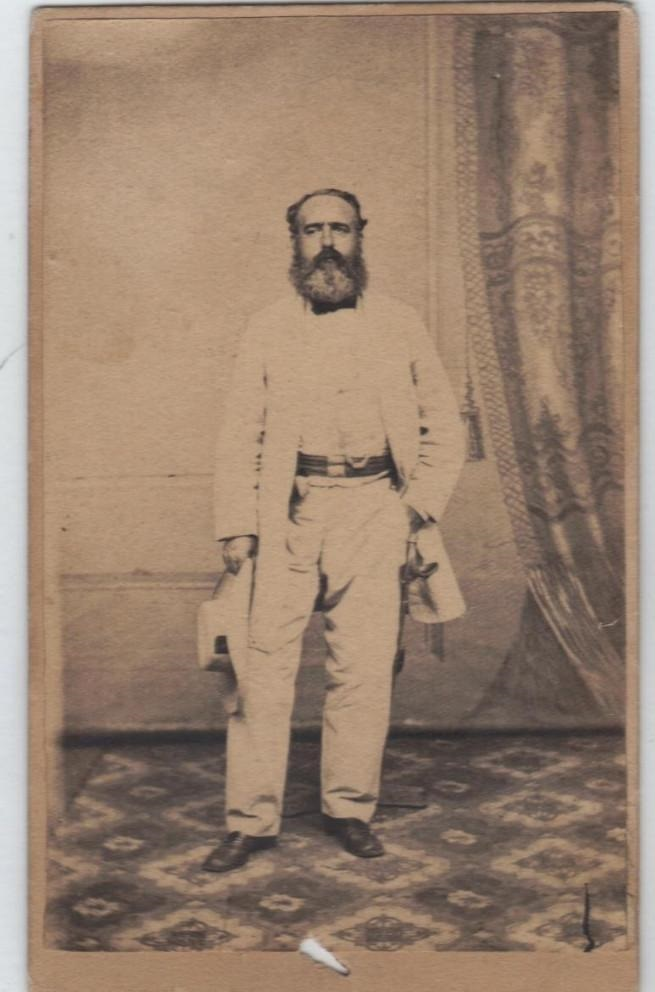
José de la Gándara in Santo Domingo

In February 1863 a rebellion broke out in the provinces of Azua and Santiago but was crushed by brigadier Manuel Buceta. Simultaneously, discontent in the royal court and parliament in regards to the occupation of Santo Domingo contributed to the collapse of O'Donnell's government and his resignation on 3 March. He was replaced by Manuel de Pando, 6th Marquess of Miraflores. In April, the Spanish defeated another rebellion by general Lucas de Peña at Cibao.

On 16 August, fourteen dissidents led by Santiago Rodríguez Masagó, Benito Monción, and José Cabrera crossed the Haitian border and made the Grito del Capotillo ("Cry of El Capotillo mountain"), calling Dominicans to rise against Spanish rule. The subsequent uprising routed a small Spanish detachment and extended to almost the entire provinces of La Vega and Santiago, along with numerous enclaves in the country. The rebel army was led by generals Monción, Gaspar Polanco, and Pepillo Salcedo, along with Buenaventura Báez from exile. They were assisted by the Haitian general Ogé Longuefosse, and after his arrest by Haitian authorities, by Sylvain Salnave, who rose in northern Haiti after accusing the Geffrard government of not opposing the Spanish takeover of Santo Domingo. The Haitian rebels even considered the idea of restoring northern Haiti's independence and joining their Dominican counterparts in a new country covering the northern half of Hispaniola.

The war resembled the later independence wars in Cuba, with few large engagements but abundant prisoner executions, killings of livestock, poisoning of wells, and felling of fruit trees. The Dominicans, more numerous and with better knowledge of the terrain, controlled the countryside and ambushed the Spaniards in forested areas, armed with lances, machetes, and few rifles. The Dominicans had a very limited number of artillery pieces but employed them effectively against Spanish soldiers. Their war parties could lack gear to the point of being barely dressed, with bare legs and feet, and ride horses on saddles made of banana leaves and goat skins. They beheaded their enemies with machetes, while the Spanish executed their prisoners by hanging and firing squad. The Spanish held the cities and coastal areas, where they were supported by naval artillery, and ventured into the interior following guides called prácticos. Villages won were lost as soon as the troops moved elsewhere. After entering a population, the first action of the insurgents was often to burn the town hall, archives, and documentation of the Spanish judiciary. Communications between insurgent-held villages were often maintained by women while the men fled to and hid in the countryside.

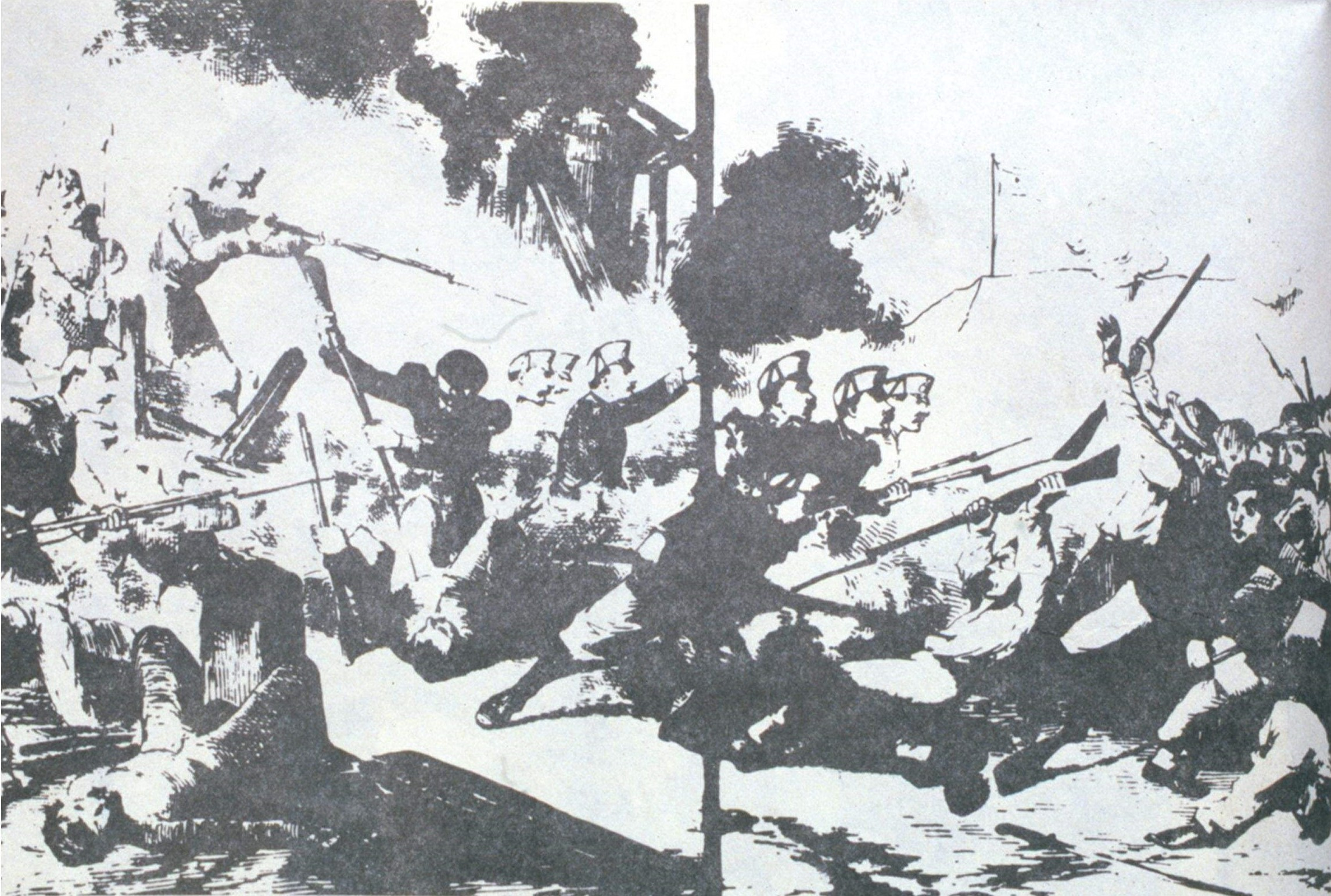
Spanish bayonet charge at the Battle of Santiago (1863)

In September Spain sent 20,000 reinforcements commanded by Carlos de Vargas that included troops from Cuba, Puerto Rico, and the Iberian Peninsula. These were later increased to 35,000 troops plus 5,000 Dominicans loyal to Santana. The former included Valeriano Weyler and Nicolás Estévanez, and the latter Máximo Gómez. However these reinforcements could not prevent the falls of Santiago de los Caballeros and Puerto Plata, which were burned by the insurgents and gave them control of the northern part of the country. In Santiago, they captured 6,000 rifles, proclaimed the independence of the Second Dominican Republic and formed a provisional government led by Salcedo, who declared Santana a traitor and ordered him to be shot on sight.

Santana led a Spanish-Dominican army north but stalled at Monte Plata, losing precious time that allowed the provisional government to consolidate itself and send general Gregorio Luperón to intercept him. Luperón took the strategic mountain Sillón de la Viuda ahead of Santana and defeated the royalist forces at the Battle of Arroyo Bermejo on 23 September, forcing Santana to retreat to Guanuma. At Yamasá, the Dominicans captured Santana's supply train along with two Spanish generals and one hundred soldiers. Many soldiers deserted Santana and he retired to his personal lands in El Seibo.

On 31 March 1864, the Spanish appointed a new governor and captain-general, José de la Gándara y Navarro, who ordered Santana's retreat to Santo Domingo. Santana refused, and Gándara ordered him to come personally to Santo Domingo and face a court-martial on charges of contempt. Gándara planned to remove Santana from the island, but a few days after he arrived in the capital, on 14 June, Santana died of a probable stroke and was buried at the Fortaleza Ozama.

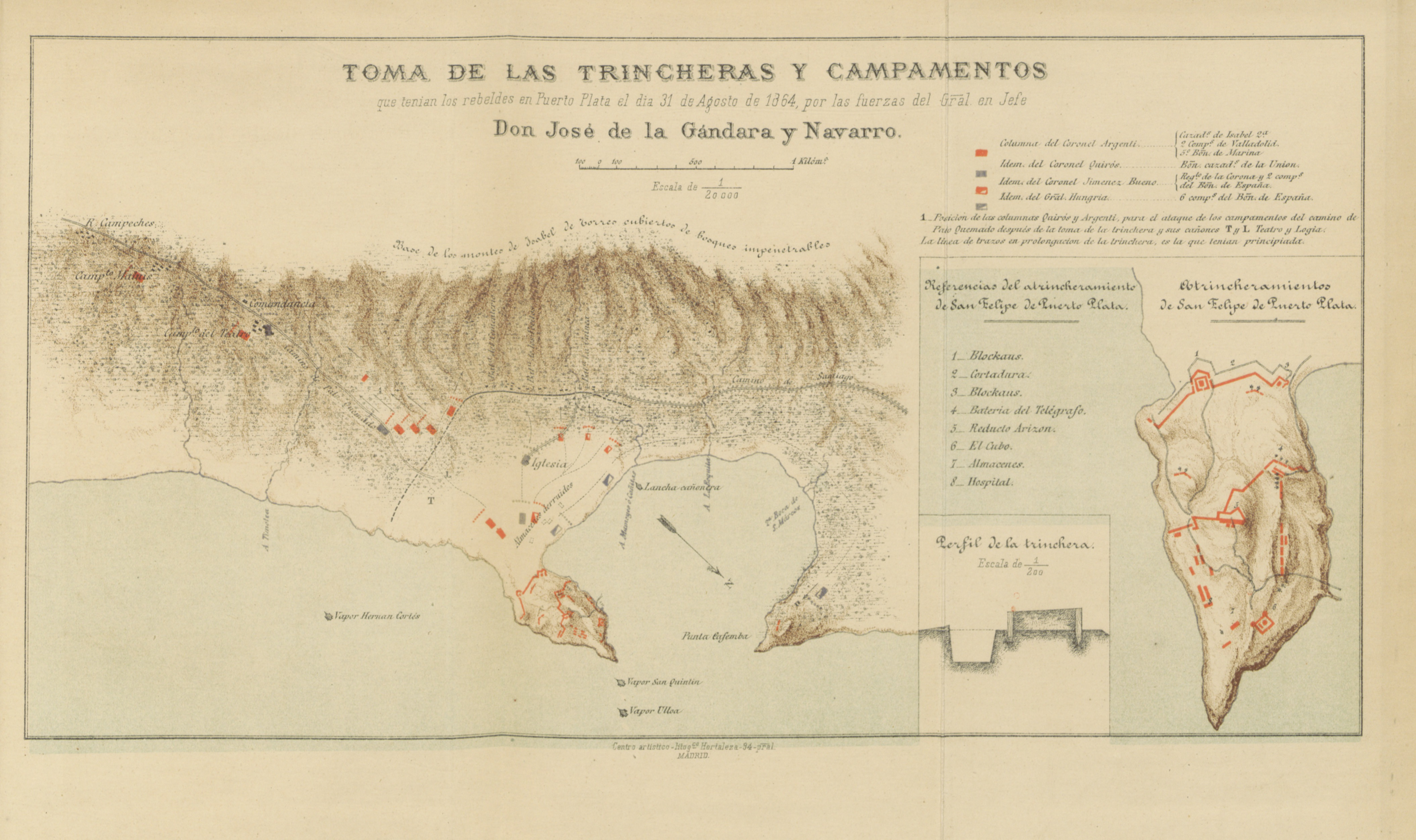
Map of the Spanish capture of Puerto Plata, by José de la Gándara

Gándara launched an amphibious offensive against the northern ports to cut off the insurgents from outside support. On 15 May, 6,000 troops from Santiago de Cuba captured Monte Cristi, but sustained heavy losses, including the wounding of field marshal Fernando Primo de Rivera. On 31 August Gándara took Puerto Plata. The Spanish also helped Geffrard defeat Salnave in Haiti. However, Gándara's attempt to advance on Santiago de los Caballeros was unsuccessful, as the Dominicans harassed his forces and intercepted many of his supplies.

The reintegration of Santo Domingo, which had been considered a minor affair in the beginning, unexpectedly ballooned to become the first issue of Spain's overseas policy. Around 18,000 Spaniards died, not counting Dominican royalists, Cubans, and Puerto Ricans. For every ten casualties, one died in combat and nine of diseases like yellow fever, malaria, and dysentery. The Dominicans, who were used to the local diseases, lost over 4,000 men total. Continuing the war required sending 30,000 men, renewing them every six months, and writing one third off as fatalities. Furthermore, the war was a drain on the Cuban treasury, and was generating discontent in the neighboring island.

As 1864 went on, more Spanish voices began to argue for the abandonment of Santo Domingo. The captain-general of Cuba Domingo Dulce denounced the annexation as a deception suffered by Spain, with no evident benefices and many damages. Gándara agreed with Dulce, and the Cortes began to debate withdrawal. A major concern was the end of the American Civil War, which was considered imminent after Lincoln's victory in the 1864 United States presidential election, and possible U.S. alliance with the Dominicans. Prime minister Ramón María Narváez defended leaving Santo Domingo, but queen Isabella II was opposed, causing a government crisis. After Francisco Javier de Istúriz failed to form a new government, the queen surrendered and authorized the withdrawal on 3 March 1865. The Cortes voted 157 to 68 for the withdrawal on 1 April, and the Senate 93 to 39 on 29 April. Withdrawal was officially announced on 1 May. The last Spanish troops left on 11 July, several months after an armistice allowed the Spanish to retreat to a few coastal cities to prepare for the evacuation.

== Aftermath ==
=== In Spain ===
==== Evacuation to Cuba ====
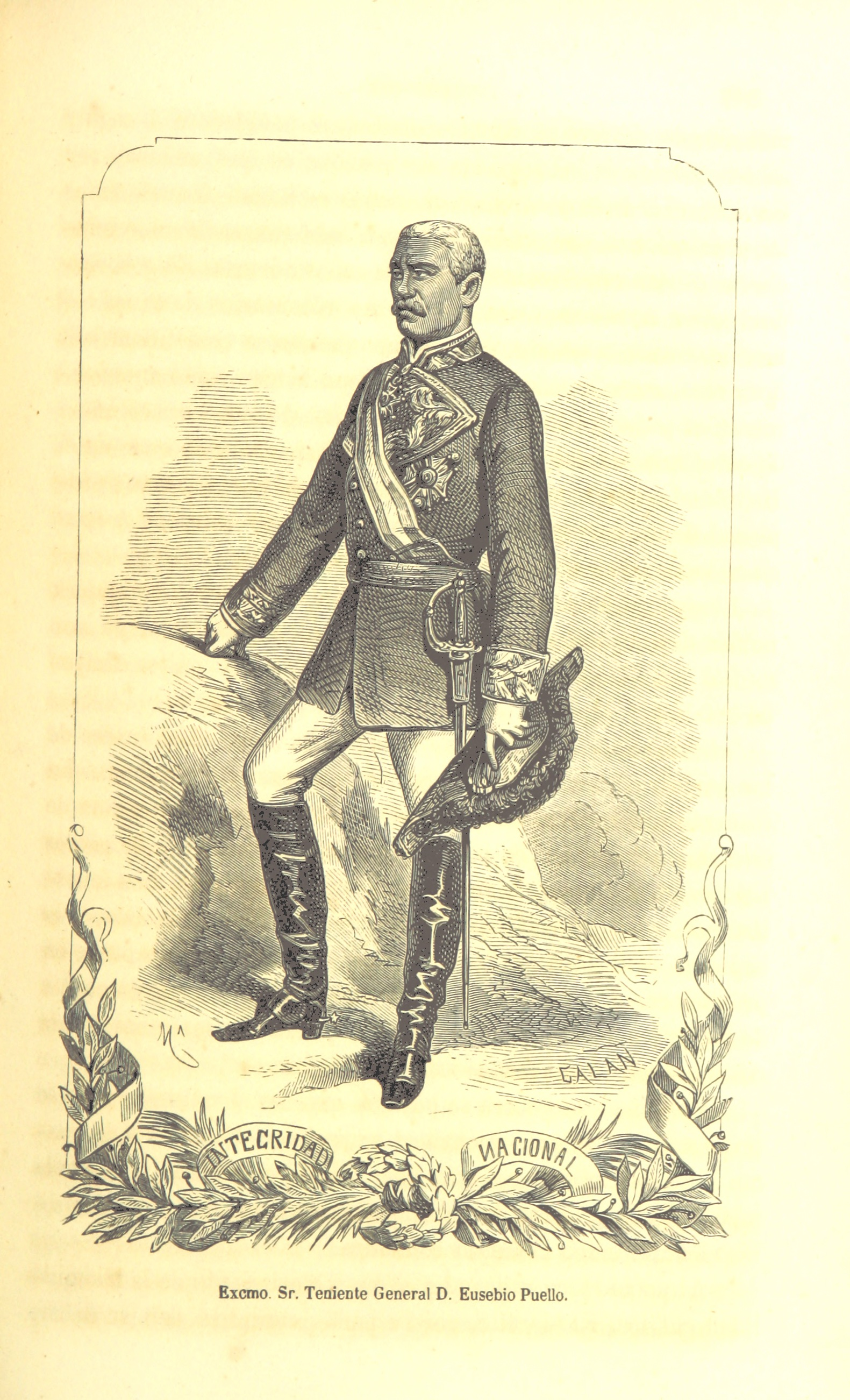
Eusebio Puello c. 1870

The Spanish army retreated to Cuba with numerous hostages to ensure their exchange for Spanish prisoner of the Dominicans. Dominicans loyal to Spain also left the island, but while white officers were absorbed into the Spanish army, blacks and mulattos were not allowed for fear of the reaction that this would cause in Cuba. Many black officers were even abandoned in Curaçao and Saint Thomas as alternative to being taken to the island. The exception was field marshal Eusebio Puello, who was able to join the Cuban colonial army and fought against the insurgents in the Ten Years' War (1868–1878), but even he was later transferred to the Iberian Peninsula. Barred from the colonial army, Máximo Gómez and others joined the Cuban Liberation Army and provided its initial training and leadership. The Cuban insurgents were called mambises after their Dominican predecessors.

Valeriano Weyler, who was wounded in the Dominican campaign, believed that the Spanish defeat was caused by politicians and a lack of adequate gear rather than incorrect battle tactics. He later led the reconcentration policy, a controversial but effective counter-insurgency in the Cuban War of Independence (1895–1898), until he was relieved from command just before the Spanish-American War in 1898.

==== International image ====
In the beginning, the voluntary annexation of the Dominican Republic reinforced Spain's international image of being a great power in recovery that it had acquired after the Hispano-Moroccan War of 1859–1860. The withdrawal just five years later, coupled with Juan Prim's refusal to participate in the Second French Intervention in Mexico, ended this impression and renewed previous ones of Spain being a country in decline. In the Caribbean, the departure reduced Spanish influence which was replaced by the United States, while in the rest of Latin America, the annexation and response to the Dominican resistance, followed by the Chincha Islands War, made Spain the "most hated" European country in the region, at least until reports of French actions in Mexico overshadowed them.

==== Spanish society ====
Within Spain, a similar discredit befell politicians, Queen Isabella II, and the military, who lost the popularity won in the Hispano-Moroccan War and paved the way for the overthrow of the House of Bourbon in the Glorious Revolution of 1868. The recovery of the American colonies was deemed impossible. The heavy death toll among Peninsulares intensified calls by common people and republicans to abolish the "Quintas" draft system, and popularized the anti-militarism, republicanism, and workers movement that reached their peak with the brief First Spanish Republic in 1873.

=== In the Dominican Republic ===
==== Haitian-Dominican relations ====
The Second Dominican Republic replaced the antihaitianismo and hispanophilia of the First Dominican Republic with friendliness and proposals for alliance, federation, and shared citizenship with Haiti, which would be silenced in the Dominican Republic when antihaitianismo returned in the 20th century. The state motto was changed from "God, Fatherland, and Freedom" to "Freedom, Equality, and Union", reflecting a push for revolutionary republicanism, racial and religious equality. References to the name of the island changed from Hispaniola to "Haiti", and people were addressed as "citizen" including government members like "citizen President Gaspar Polanco" and "citizen Minister Rafael Leyba". Despite enjoying widespread popular support in Haiti, the Haitian government rebuffed such proposals and did not recognize the Dominican Republic until 1874.

==== Proposed U.S. annexation ====
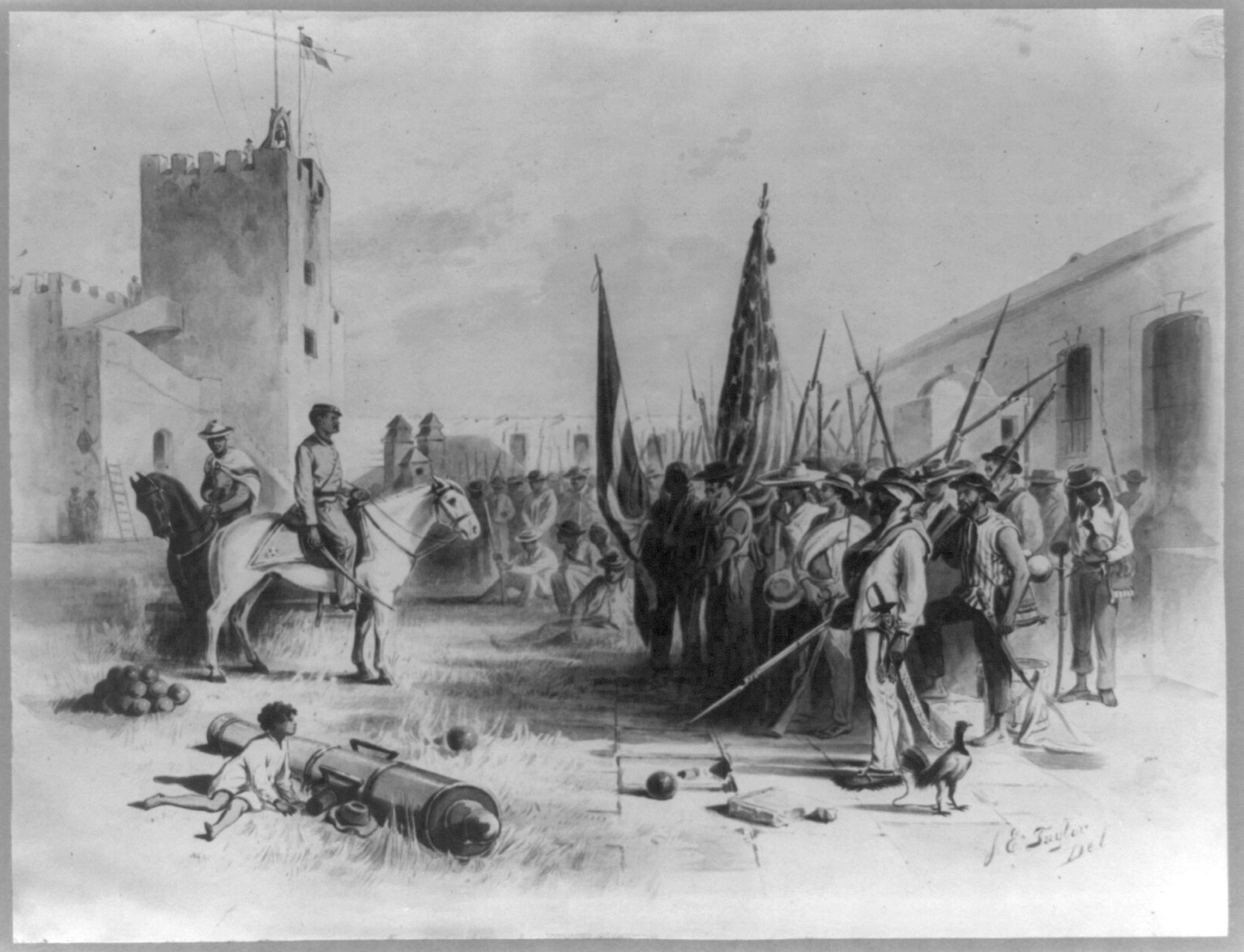
Demonstration of the Seibo Regiment in Santo Domingo in favor of the U.S. annexation, 1871

Secretary Seward and presidents Andrew Johnson and Ulysses S. Grant showed renewed interest in a naval base in Samaná, and negotiations were conducted with Cabral and later with Báez. In 1869, Báez offered the annexation of the whole country to Grant as a solution to bankruptcy and the precariousness of his own rule, repeating the actions of Santana. A treaty was negotiated with U.S. general Orville Babcock, according to which the U.S. would annex the country in exchange for $1.5 million and the payment of the Dominican foreign debt. If Congress rejected the treaty, the U.S. could still purchase the Bay of Samaná alone. Grant claimed that Santo Domingo could be a safe haven for African Americans who wished to the leave the United States. However, the vote was delayed and the treaty firmly opposed by senators Charles Sumner and Carl Schurz, who had been involved in foreign relations during the Civil War. They accused Grant of upholding Báez's regime rather than following the will of the Dominican people, and warned of the toll that tropical diseases would have on "the Anglo-Saxon race". Congress voted against the annexation of the Dominican Republic in 1870, and of Samaná alone in 1871. Other possibilities discussed were a lease of Samaná to the United States for 50 years, extendable, or to a private company for 99 years.

==== Spanish-Dominican relations ====
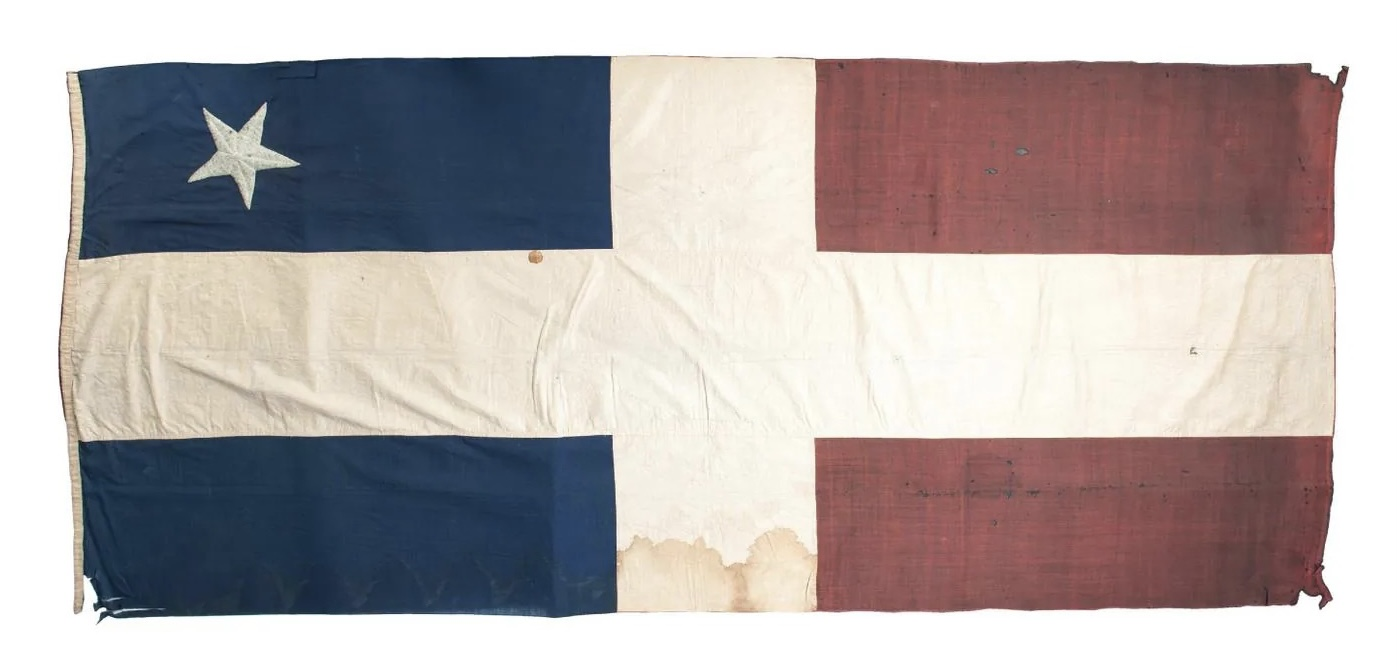
The original Grito de Lares flag, using a design similar to the Dominican flag

The Second Republic called for the independence and abolition of slavery in the remaining Spanish colonies of Cuba and Puerto Rico, as being necessary for the continued independence of the Dominican Republic and Haiti. There were also proposals for an Antillean Confederation of Cuba, Puerto Rico, and the Dominican Republic. Puerto Plata became a refuge for Puerto Rican abolitionists, and the first Grito de Lares flag was designed by Gregorio Luperón.

The First Spanish Republic recognized the Dominican Republic in 1874. Spain's reasons for recognition included the limitation of U.S. influence, prevention of the lease of Samaná, and the end of the Dominican Republic's sanctuary for Cuban and Puerto Rican separatists. Except for a reference to the latter, the wording of the 1874 recognition was almost identical to the one in 1854. Báez offered Spain the establishment of a protectorate over the Dominican Republic, which was rejected. A few days before the recognition was made official, Báez was deposed by Luperón.

At the time of the annexation, the Spanish exalted Christopher Columbus as a Spanish-Dominican connection, located and restored his residence in Santo Domingo. The Second Republic vindicated Columbus as a Dominican symbol by announcing the discovery of his remains in the Cathedral of Santo Domingo and claiming that the body exhumed and taken to Havana by the Spanish in 1795 was misidentified. In 2024, DNA analysis confirmed that the remains of Columbus now held in the Cathedral of Seville do indeed belong to him, though Dominican authorities wouldn't accept the results without a second analysis by a neutral party.

== List of governors and captain-generals ==
- 1861–1862: Pedro Santana
- 1862–1863: Felipe Rivero y Lemoine
- 1863–1864: Carlos de Vargas
- 1864–1865: José de la Gándara y Navarro

== See also ==
- Annexation of Santo Domingo
- History of the Dominican Republic
- Dominican Republic–Spain relations
- Reign of Isabella II
- Spain and the American Civil War
