= Yabacao River =

Location
- Country: Dominican Republic

The Yabacao River is a river of the Dominican Republic.

== See also ==
- List of rivers of the Dominican Republic
