= Second Dominican Republic =

Period of Dominican statehood following the 2nd independence from Spain (1865–1916)

Dominican Republic República Dominicana (Spanish) República Dominicana (Latin)
- 1865–1916
- Flag Coat of arms
- Capital: Santo Domingo
- Common languages: Spanish
- Government: Presidential republic
- President
  - 1865–1916: List
- History
  - Spanish evacuation: 15 July 1865
  - U.S. occupation: 15 May 1916
- Currency: Dominican peso (until 1905); United States dollar (from 1905)
Preceded by	Succeeded by
Spanish annexation of the Dominican Republic	Military Government of Santo Domingo

The Second Dominican Republic was the predecessor of the Dominican Republic. It began with the restoration of the country in 1865 and culminated with the American intervention in 1916.

In the period of the Second Republic the political conflicts continued, now between the last government restored by Antonio Pimentel, who refused to rule from Santo Domingo, as it was commanded by the Congress, and José María Cabral who had to rule from Santo Domingo, answering to the lack of deputation of Pimentel. Cabral remained in power and adapted the constitution.

In the administration of Cabral, the parties of colours became the owners of the political stage, especially: the Reds and the Blues. The Red Party, the most powerful party, which ruled for six consecutive years, was led by Buenaventura Báez.

Afterwards there was a succession of governments until 1887, the beginning of the dictatorship of Lilís that lasted until 1899.

== History ==
After the restoration of the Republic and as an effect of the local nature of the guerrilla struggle, the scarce urban development, the lack of land communications and the lack of a true national market, regional caudillismo or Caciquismo predominated in the Dominican social and political scene. This time the forces were polarized between the followers of Buenaventura Báez, who after the death of Pedro Santana represented the big haterps and a commercial bourgeoisie that was still essentially foreign and annexationist, constituting the conservative or Red Party. Their liberal rivals or Blue Party, who had their top leader Gregorio Luperón, with the support of the Cibao farmers, the commercial petty bourgeoisie, the young intellectuals and the new Creole bourgeoisie.

=== Rise of Baecism, and Six Years' War: 1868–1874 ===
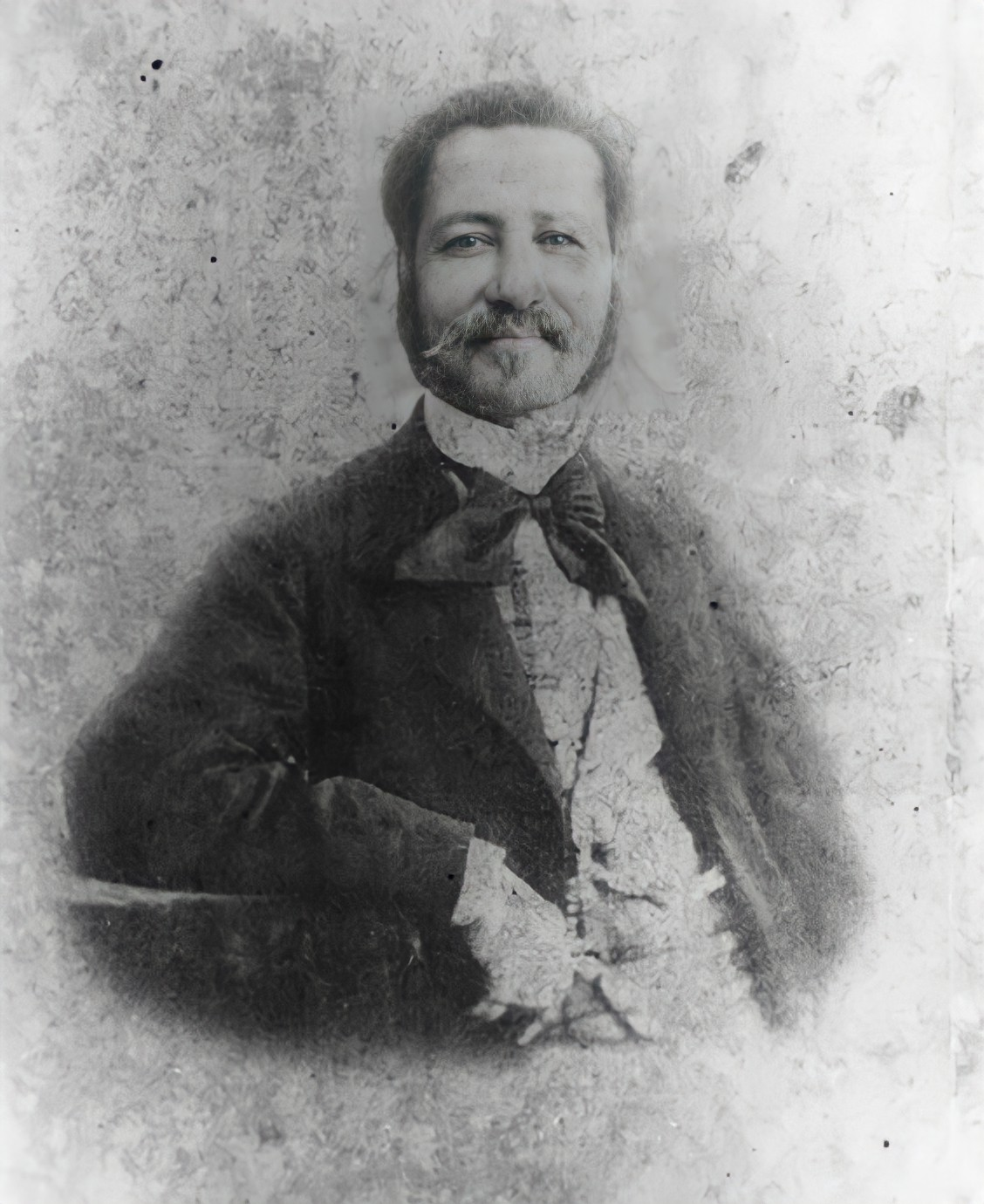
Following the independence from Spain in 1865, the annexationist politician Buenaventura Báez rose to power, once again with another annexation protect.

Since 1864, in this period in the economy at first the economy was booming due to the restoration of the sugar industry with Cuban immigrants who arrived and invested their resources. The indebtedness began, which consisted of the Hartmont loan, which included of a loan for the sum of 420,000 pounds of sterling, but only the government only received 38,000 pounds of sterling. In this period, the main parties were the blues of Gregorio Luperón, and the reds by Buenaventura Báez. In conclusion, the Báez government was characterized by being a corrupt government, debt, and political repression, despotism and annexations. Their governments were characterized by being very corrupt and by governing for the benefit of their fortune, the most notable act being the one committed in 1857 when they bought with inorganic currency the record harvest of tobacco, which was the country's main export product, and which later he sold, keeping the currency; The currency issued by the government was devalued by 1000%, causing the ruin of tobacco producers. The realization of the Harmont loan, led to the external debt of the country.

It was the annexation project of 1870 to the United States, and finally it strengthened its regime of terror with the clear objective of liquidating the opposition of the Blue Party. Finally, the war against Baecism led by the Blues culminated in the overthrow of Báez. Afterwards, the Dominican state was under the governments of the blues: This was concerned with the organization of both the army and education. It was also concerned with regulating relations with Haiti, proceeding to establish diplomatic ties. On July 23, 1880, there was a change of government, Fernando Arturo de Meriño became president with the full support of the blue party.

After the Báez government, several governments emerged until July 23, 1880, when the first father, Fernando Arturo de Meriño, came to power in the government, and there was a completely peaceful change. However, the Baesismos opposed him which led him to issue a decree known as the decree of San Fernando, which consisted of anyone found with soul in hand being punished with the penalty of death. After the Meriño government came the tyranny of Ulises Heureaux. This government was characterized by its ambition for power, which led it at the time of the elections to take fraudulent measures, which were to persecute its political opponents and take repression against its opponents, so much so. Since at the time of the elections the votes of the opponents did not appear, he promulgated a constitution in 1887 and another in 1896. In this period the period was increased to four years, but in this government positive things happened in this period. In 1892, the first telecommunications arrived in the country to communicate with the rest of the world in the field of electric lighting.

Since 1874, the Blue Party of Luperón increased its influence along with the growth of agriculture, commerce managed by Dominicans organized in "credit boards" and the basic and professional education of larger groups of Dominicans, until in 1879, he led an insurrection from Puerto Plata, which gave rise to a true liberal revolution in the country. The Luperón government and the three biennial regimes under its influence: Meriño, Heureaux and Billini-Woss y Gil, continued a political line of nationalism and the promotion of agriculture and industry, which ultimately produced significant economic growth in the country. Although it also had the long-term virtue of increasing the country's dependence on the capitalist metropolises. During that period, normal and professional education was also developed under the guidance of Hostos and Meriño, and great national values in literature and law emerged in the country. Luperón's self-marginalization from government tasks and his lack of support for the anti-civilist pretensions of the regional chiefs gave way to the former's main lieutenant, Ulises Heureaux, allying himself with these leaders and with the growing commercial bourgeoisie, for which he obtained new foreign loans and established a personal dictatorship, in which he also gave effect to the haters and bourgeois Baecistas to neutralize the liberals of his old party.

=== Dictatorship of Ulises Heureaux ===
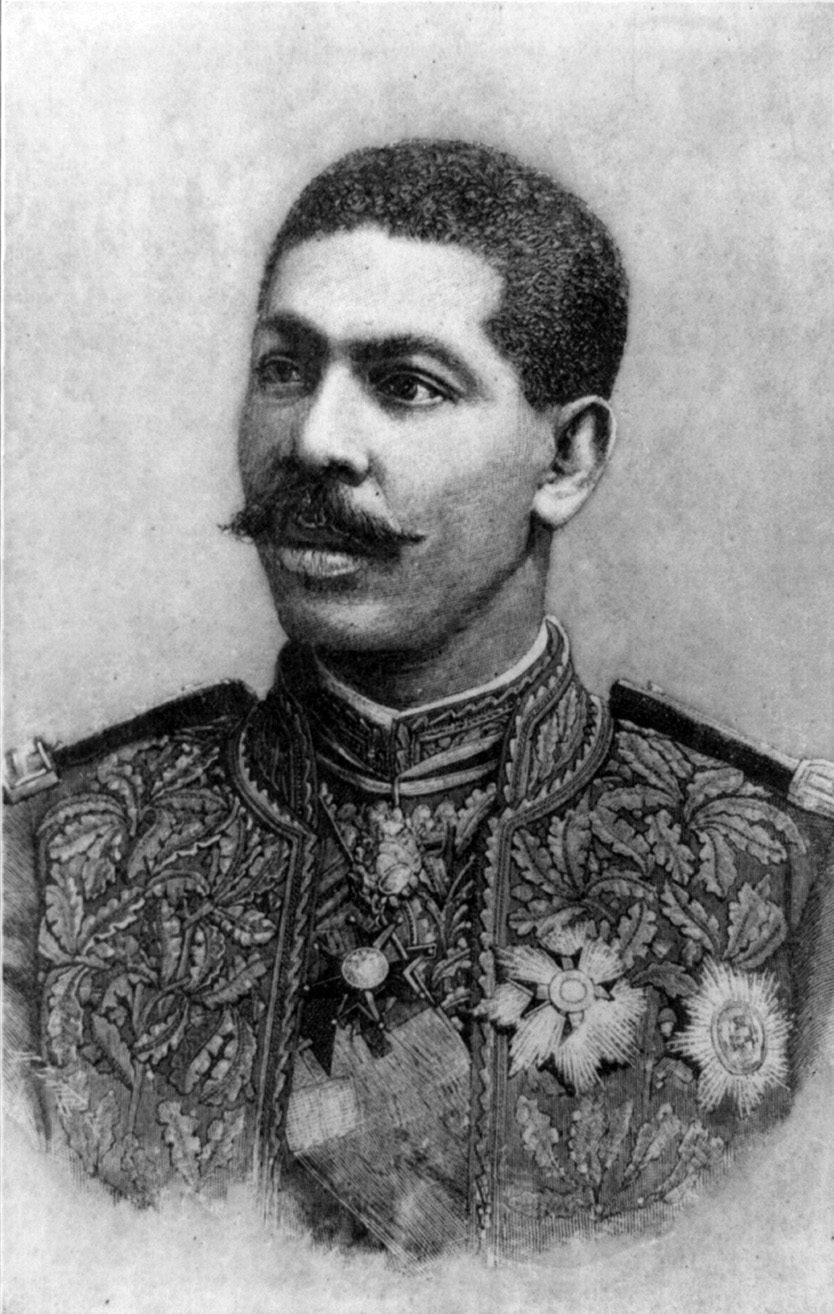
Ulises Heureaux would serve as president (and as a dictator) of the Dominican Republic until his assassination in 1899.

Later at the end of Meriño's government period, General Luperón recommended Ulises Heureaux who won the elections in 1888. The forced peace of the Heureaux (Lilis) regime and its inefficient and corrupt administration, they created the conditions for a superior development of agriculture and particularly of the sugar industry; but they ended up plunging the country into monetary insolvency and growing financial and political dependence on North America. The bankruptcy of commerce and agriculture, the drop in sugar prices, the lack of economic resources to keep local leaders under control, and the country's fatigue with his dictatorship, precipitated his assassination and the subsequent fall of his regime in 1899. The Lilis dictatorship constitutes the most typical political period of the 19th century in Dominican history.

With Lilis, the economic policy of a blue partisanship was characterized, with regard to the development of the national economy, by a manifest surrenderist tendency that translated into concessions, favors and privileges to foreign captains. The dictatorship made serious and numerous commitments regarding loans and monetary circulation. Corruption and the personalist regime as an administrative norm led to the liquidation of democratic and liberal principles, and the restriction of national capitalism based on sponsoring foreign investment. The death of Ulises Heureaux occurred on July 26, 1899, while he was in Moca. It was a group of Mocanos, at the head of which were Ramón Cáceres, Jacobo Lara and Horacio Vásquez, who prepared the conspiracy; and it was the first two who opened fire and killed Lilis.

=== Beginning of Horacio Vázquez's caudillism ===
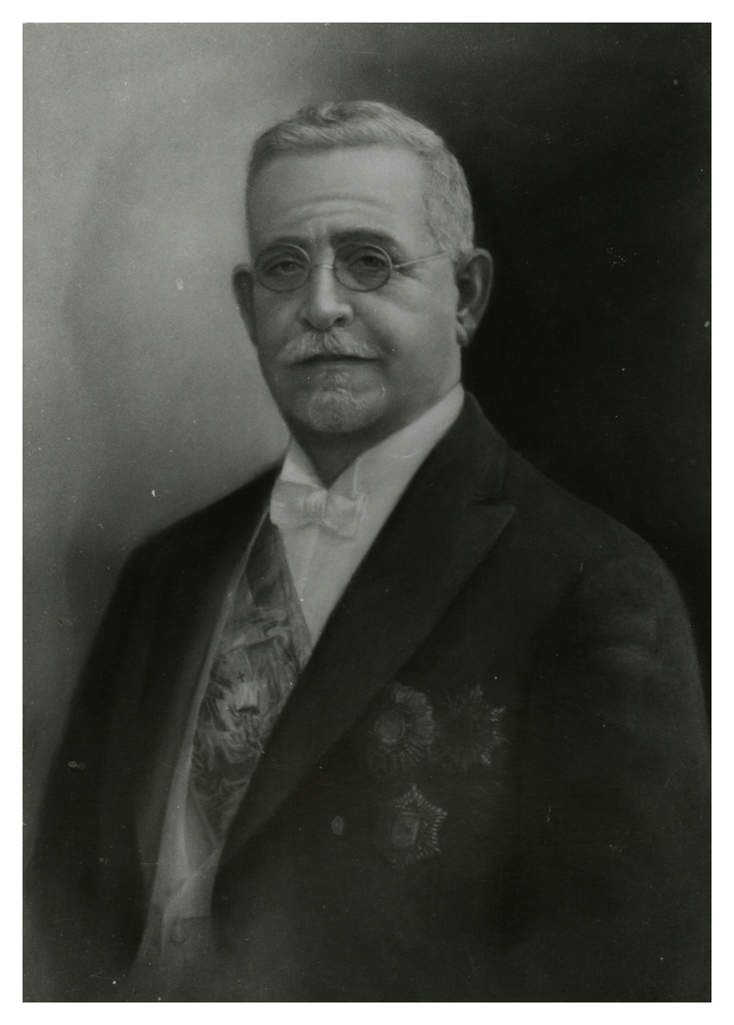
The fall of the Heureaux dictatorship led to the rise of Horacio Vásquez to the presidency following the U.S occupation of 1916.

After the fall of Heureaux, regional caudillism was accentuated, although under the guise of two new national leaders: Juan Isidro Jiménes, a merchant from Montecristi who received the support of the old caciques, the hateros, the Catholic Church and the bourgeoisie of Santiago; and General Horacio Vásquez, who relied on the new leaders, the farmers of Cibao, the positivist intellectuals forged by Eugenio María de Hostos, the bourgeoisie of the capital, Puerto Plata and Este, and by North American imperialism.

After the overthrow of Jiménes by Horacism in 1902, the country fell into a state of almost permanent civil war, while North American demands for greater economic and political control that would allow the free expansion of its interests, sharpened the situation. In the end, after a second provisional government of Horacio Vásquez (1902–03) and another of a coalition of Jimenistas and former Lilisists headed General Morales Languasco, a Jimenist who took power with the support of the Horacistas, he abandoned his leader to be isolated and marginalized from power by them, and to be finally replaced by the Horacista vice president, General Ramón Cáceres, in January 1906. Under Morales and especially with Ramón Cáceres, the government completely folded to the financial, political and greater American economic penetration demands; Its sugar mills operated without paying export and import taxes, maritime transport was monopolized by the Clyde company of that nationality and the products of that country almost completely displaced Europeans.

After a Dominican-American Convention signed in 1905 that was not approved in the North American Senate, perhaps due to its ultracolonialist nature, it was finally concluded in 1907, by virtue of which the United States not only began to control all customs of the country and retain at least 40% of its income, but they established the prerogative of the North American government to deliver the rest of the proceeds to the Dominican government that recognized it as legitimate and the prohibition of new loans being contracted without its consent. In the political order, this regime, called "enlightened despotism" by some, enjoyed full North American support, which was evident with its military incursion and machine-gunning of Villa Duarte and the Jimenist besiegers in February 1904, which allowed Morales defeated the formidable insurrection that opposed him. But he also had the firm support of the intellectuals, the local bourgeoisie, the regional leaders of central Cibao and the farmers.

With this support and after consolidating power by force, Cáceres attempted under North American guidance to take away the power enjoyed by the local chiefs, thanks to the development of a professional army and a civil guard personally attached to the president and the commander of weapons of Santo Domingo, General Alfredo Victoria. To this end, he marginalized many of these "chieftains" as "available generals" by withdrawing their followers from the ranks of the army. With these measures, accompanied by the construction of roads and telecommunications, and the increase in agriculture, the sugar industry, commerce and education, the sugar industry, commerce and education, conditions began to be created for the development of a centralized regime dominated by the bourgeoisie dependent on the United States of America that would supplant the prevailing caudillismo. But there were still no complete conditions for that change.

Horacio Vásquez and the regional leaders of both sides felt marginalized and some of them, led by Luis Tejeda, killed Cáceres in 1911. General Alfredo Victoria gave his uncle Eladio the presidency, but in the face of widespread repudiation and insurrection, he had to resign command a year later in 1912. After Cáceres' death, two new parties emerged in the public arena: the Partido Progressive of Federico Velázquez, former finance minister of Cáceres who was attributed the greatest responsibility in said administration; and the Legalist Party led by General Luis Felipe Vidal, a southern regional leader who participated in the assassination of Cáceres, who took away much of the support it enjoyed from Jimenism in that region of the country. A "Liberal Reformist Party" also briefly manifested itself, composed mainly of young university students led by Rafael Estrella Ureña. In this situation, the northwestern guerrilla leader Desiderio Arias emerged, of Jimenist origin, dominant in Cibao, who represented the opposition of that sector of the rural petty bourgeoisie to a centralized government subject to American imperialism. Thus, the brief governments of Archbishop Nouel (1912-1913) and General José Bordas Valdez (1913-1914) could not survive the growing pressures from North America, as well as from the Desideristas and Horacistas alike. In the end, the North American government, determined to completely control the Dominican state to use it for its political and economic benefit, imposed a provisional government headed by Dr. Ramón Báez and elections in 2 months. These elections were very close, but were won by Juan Isidro Jiménes in alliance with the Progressive Party of Velásquez in 1914.

The new Jiménes government, despite its constitutional basis, was faced with passions even more intense than the previous ones, since together with a North American government impatient to impose its will, which already in 1915 intervened militarily in Haiti, it had to face to an emboldened Desiderio Arias and much more powerful than ever in his capacity as Minister of War and Navy and with his supporters in control of the Ministry of the Interior and Police, the capital's weapons command, the Republican Guard and the majority of the positions of the National Congress in the hands of Jimenism. In a supreme attempt to assert his authority, Jiménes finally dismissed Desiderio and his most qualified followers, but he took control of the Foltaleza Ozama and the capital, and began the operation to have Jiménes accused before the senate. The Americans then landed military personnel "to guarantee the lives of their citizens," but they threatened to take the Ozama Fortress and, given its importance, Jiménes resigned. Shortly afterward, North American troops entered the city without any opposition from the desiderists. The Dominicans then selected Dr. Francisco Henríquez y Carvajal as president, but when he did not comply with North American designs, they ignored their government, declared a military regime under their absolute control (1916), dissolved the congress, disarmed the country and suppressed public liberties.

The US military government changed land, immigration and customs legislation so that sugar mills could expand rapidly and hire Haitians as low-cost seasonal workers, exempting them from all taxes. They also drastically lowered import taxes on North American products, causing nascent Dominican manufacturing to collapse. The regime connected the main regions of the country by road, expanded telephone communications, improved sanitary conditions and reestablished the educational system. paralyzed as a result of the anarchy prevailing after the death of Cáceres, which opened new paths to agriculture and internal trade. After the end of the First World War, in which the rights of small nationalities were vindicated, the Dominican people began a national and international civic campaign in 1919 to recover their lost sovereignty, and organized around the slogan of withdrawal, "pure and simple" of the occupation forces, without conditions of any kind. But in the face of North American intransigence, the traditional caudillo parties accepted a gradual withdrawal, the validity of all the measures dictated by the interveners, the maintenance of the armed forces created by the occupation government, the renewal of the anti-national Dominican-American Convention, the maintenance of the customs tariff and tax exemptions for sugar mills, favorable to their economic interests. Under the terms of the "Hughes-Peynado Plan", with the only concession of the establishment of an exclusively civilian provisional government headed by Juan Bautista Vicini Burgos, with the task of organizing elections to elect the national authorities, the regime of American military intervention.

== Presidents ==
Presidents of the Second Republic
Pimentel	Cabral y Luna	Guillermo y Guerrero	Báez	Cabral	Báez	González Santín	Espaillat
1865-1865	1865-1865	1865-1865	1865-1866	1866-1868	1868-1874	1874-1876	1876-1876
González Santín	Cabral y Figueredo	Báez	González Santín	Guillermo y Bastardo	González Santín	De Castro	Guillermo
1876-1876	1876-1876	1876-1878	1878-1878	1878-1878	1878-1878	1878-1878	1878-1879
Luperón	Monsignor De Meriño	Lilis	Billini	Woss y Gil	Lilis	Figuereo	Vásquez
1879-1880	1880-1882	1882-1884	1884-1885	1885-1887	1887-1899	1899-1899	1899-1899
Jimenes	Vásquez	Woss y Gil	Morales Languasco	Cáceres	Victoria	Monsignor Nouel	Bordas Valdez
1899-1902	1902-1903	1903-1903	1903-1905	1905-1911	1911-1912	1912-1913	1913-1914
Báez Machado	Jimenes	Henríquez y Carvajal	Vicini Burgos				
1914-1914	1914-1916	1916-1916	1922-1924				

== See also ==
- History of the Dominican Republic
- First Dominican Republic
- Third Dominican Republic
- United States occupation of the Dominican Republic
