= Vice President of the Dominican Republic =

Second-highest constitutional office in Dominican Republic

Constitutional Vice President of the Dominican Republic
- Vicepresidenta Constitutional de la República Dominicana
- Coat of arms of the Dominican Republic Current logo of the vice presidency of the Dominican Republic

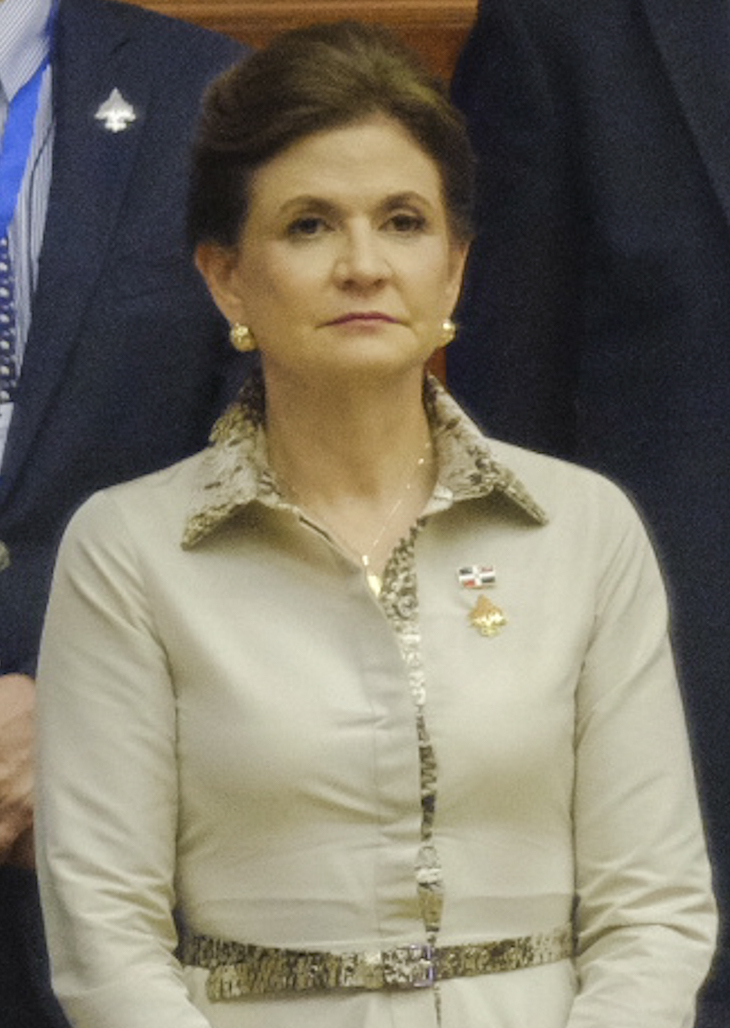
- Incumbent; Raquel Peña since 16 August 2020
- Executive branch of the Government of the Dominican Republic
- Style: His/Her Excellency Mr./Madam Constitutional Vice President of the Republic (Excelentísimo/a Señor/a Vicepresidente/a Constitucional de la República) (official); Mr./Madam Vice President (Note: for the position of vice president.) (Señor/a Vicepresidente/a) (informal); The Most Excellent (Excelentísimo/a Señor/a) (diplomatic); His/Her Excellency (Su Excelencia) (diplomatic)
- Member of: Cabinet of the Dominican Republic
- Residence: National Palace (government office)
- Seat: Santo Domingo
- Appointer: Central Electoral Board via Universal suffrage elections (Note: along with the president as a running mate.)
- Term length: Four years, with one re-election allowed
- Constituting instrument: Constitution of the Dominican Republic
- Inaugural holder: Benigno Filomeno de Rojas
- Formation: July 7, 1857 (169 years ago)
- Succession: First
- Unofficial names: ViceRDO, Dominican Vice President, Vicepresidente/a
- Salary: RD$400,000 (monthly)
- Website: vicepresidencia.gob.do (in Spanish)

The vice president of the Dominican Republic (Spanish: vicepresidente/a de la República Dominicana), officially the constitutional vice president of the Dominican Republic (Spanish: vicepresidente/a constitucional de la República Dominicana), is the second-highest political position in the Dominican Republic. The vice president is the first person in the presidential line of succession, ascending to the presidency upon the death, resignation, or removal of the president. There have been thirty-nine vice presidents of the Dominican Republic. Under the Constitution of the Dominican Republic, the vice president shall be elected along with the president.

Since the independence of the Dominican Republic in 1844 until 1865, what is considered the First Republic, there were no constitutional vice presidents. Yet, during that time there were acting vice presidents; this was under the rule of Pedro Santana.

== History ==
After the inception of the First Dominican Republic, the country was run by a Central Governing Junta led by Pedro Santana. As such, there was no need for a vice president at the time. Yet, it is believed that the first vice president of the republic was Felipe Benicio Alfau, who was elected as acting vice president by Pedro Santana. This was spurred because Santana was invited to go abroad yet the republic had to be seen to in his absence.

The Constitution of the Dominican Republic has been amended many times, and in some instances the office of the vice president had been eliminated to later be recreated. In times when the office was eliminated, if the president was leaving the country, an acting president was designated, therefore creating the post of a second in command. For example the 30th president of the Dominican Republic, Carlos Felipe Morales, elected Ramón Cáceres to be his vice president from 1903 until 1905. Then from 1905 to 1911, the previous vice president, Ramón Cáceres is elected as president and the office of the vice president is eliminated during that time span.

Also during the 31 year dictatorship of Rafael Trujillo, the office of the vice president was eliminated or vacated on several occasions.

Since 1966, which is considered the beginning of the 4th Republic, the office of the vice president of the Dominican Republic has been a permanent post. Also, the vice president has to be elected along with the president, not appointed by the latter.

== List of vice presidents of the Dominican Republic, 1844–1861 ==
Picture	Name	Began office	Left office	President
	Felipe Benicio Alfau	1853	1853	Pedro Santana
	Manuel de Regla Mota	15 February 1854	26 May 1856	Pedro Santana
	Antonio Abad Alfau	1856	1856	Manuel de Regla Mota
	Buenaventura Báez	6 October 1856	8 October 1856	Manuel de Regla Mota
	Domingo Daniel Pichardo Pró	1857	1858	Buenaventura Báez
	Benigno Filomeno de Rojas	1858	1861	Pedro Santana

== Annexation by Spain 1861–1865 and Dominican Restoration War 1863–1865 ==
Picture	Name	Began office	Left office	President
	Matías Ramón Mella	1863	1864	José Antonio Salcedo
	Ulises Francisco Espaillat	1864	1864	José Antonio Salcedo

== List of vice presidents of the Dominican Republic, 1865–1924 ==
Picture	Name	Began office	Left office	President
	Gregorio Luperón	24 January 1865	24 March 1865	Benigno Filomeno de Rojas
	Benigno Filomeno de Rojas	24 March 1865	4 August 1865	Pedro Antonio Pimentel
	Francisco Antonio Gómez y Báez	1865	1866	Buenaventura Báez
	Manuel Altagracia Cáceres	1868	1871	Buenaventura Báez
	Juan Isidro Ortea y Kennedy	1871	1874	Buenaventura Báez
	Francisco Gregorio Billini	5 March 1878	8 July 1878	Cesareo Guillermo
	Casimiro Nemesio de Moya	1882	1884	Ulises Heureaux
	Alejandro Woss y Gil	1884	1885	Francisco Gregorio Billini
	Segundo Francisco Imbert del Monte	1887	1889	Ulises Heureaux
	Manuel María Gautier	1889	1893	Ulises Heureaux
	Wenceslao Figuereo	1893	26 July 1899	Ulises Heureaux
	Horacio Vásquez	15 November 1899	2 May 1902	Juan Isidro Jimenes Pereyra
	Eugenio Deschamps Peña	March 1903	November 1903	Alejandro Woss y Gil
	Ramón Cáceres	24 November 1903	29 December 1905	Carlos Felipe Morales
Abolished (29 December 1905 – 12 July 1924)

== List of vice presidents of the Dominican Republic, 1924–1965 ==
Picture	Name	Began office	Left office	President
	Federico Velázquez	12 July 1924	16 August 1928	Horacio Vásquez
	José Dolores Alfonseca	16 August 1928	3 March 1930	Horacio Vásquez
Vacant (3 March 1930 – 16 August 1930)
	Rafael Estrella Ureña	16 August 1930	December 1931	Rafael Trujillo
Vacant (December 1931 – 16 August 1934)
	Jacinto Bienvenido Peynado	16 August 1934	16 August 1938	Rafael Trujillo
	Manuel de Jesús Troncoso de la Concha	16 August 1938	24 February 1940	Jacinto Bienvenido Peynado
Vacant (7 March 1940 – 18 May 1942; The Minister of the Armed Force was third in line)
Position abolished (18 May 1942 – 16 August 1957)
	Joaquín Antonio Balaguer Ricardo	16 August 1957	3 August 1960	Héctor Trujillo
	Rafael Filiberto Bonnelly	3 August 1960	18 January 1962	Joaquín Balaguer
	Eduardo Read Barreras	18 January 1962	1962	Rafael Filiberto Bonnelly
	Nicolás Pichardo	1962	27 February 1963	Rafael Filiberto Bonnelly
	Armando González Tamayo	27 February 1963	25 September 1963	Juan Bosch
None (Triumvirate) (26 September 1963 – 25 April 1965; chaired from December 29, 1963 by Donald Reid Cabral)
Vacant (May 1965 – 3 September 1965)
	Manuel Joaquín Castillo	3 September 1965	1 July 1966	Héctor García-Godoy

== List of vice presidents of the Dominican Republic, 1966–present ==
Picture	Name	Began office	Left office	President
	Francisco Augusto Lora	1 July 1966	16 August 1970	Joaquín Balaguer
	Carlos Rafael Goico Morales	16 August 1970	16 August 1978	Joaquín Balaguer
	Jacobo Majluta Azar	16 August 1978	4 July 1982	Antonio Guzmán Fernández
Vacant (4 July 1982 – 16 August 1982)
	Manuel Fernández Mármol	16 August 1982	20 January 1983	Salvador Jorge Blanco
Vacant (20 January 1983 – 16 August 1986)
	Carlos Morales Troncoso	16 August 1986	16 August 1994	Joaquín Balaguer
	Jacinto Peynado Garrigosa	16 August 1994	16 August 1996	Joaquín Balaguer
	Jaime David Fernández Mirabal	16 August 1996	16 August 2000	Leonel Fernández
	Milagros Ortiz Bosch	16 August 2000	16 August 2004	Hipólito Mejía
	Rafael Alburquerque	16 August 2004	16 August 2012	Leonel Fernández
	Margarita Cedeño de Fernández	16 August 2012	16 August 2020	Danilo Medina
	Raquel Peña de Antuña	16 August 2020	Incumbent	Luis Abinader

== See also ==
- List of current vice presidents
