= Francisco Gregorio Billini =

31st President of the Dominican Republic (1884–1885)

Mr. President Francisco Gregorio Billini
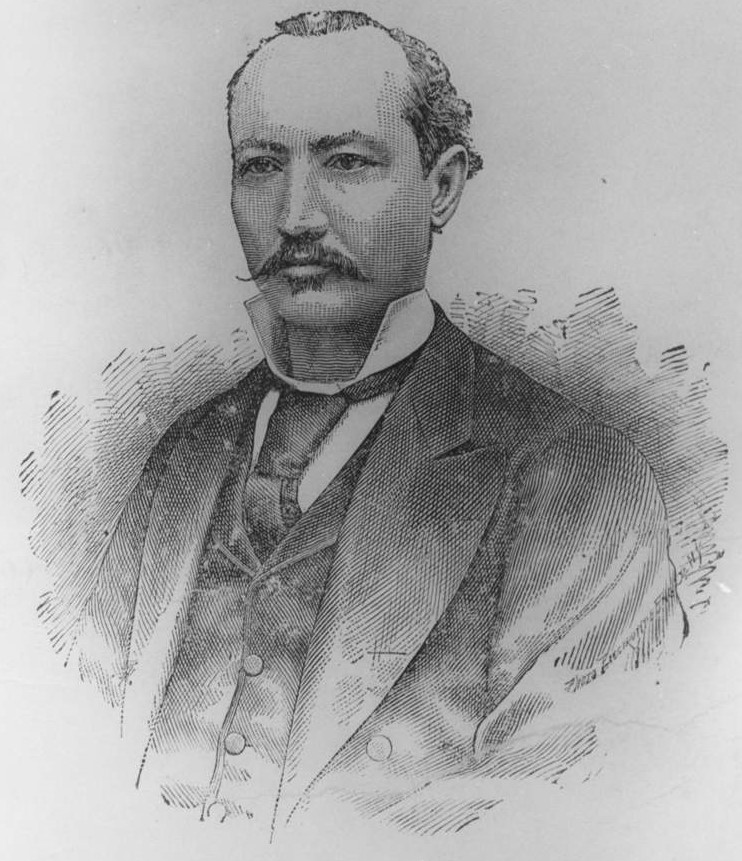

31st President of the Dominican Republic
- In office September 1, 1884 – May 16, 1885
- Vice President: Alejandro Woss y Gil
- Preceded by: Ulises Heureaux
- Succeeded by: Alejandro Woss y Gil

Vice President of the Dominican Republic
- In office 5 March 1878 – 8 July 1878
- President: Cesareo Guillermo
- Preceded by: Juan Isidro Ortea y Kennedy
- Succeeded by: Casimiro Nemesio de Moya

Personal details
- Born: May 25, 1844 Santo Domingo, Dominican Republic
- Died: November 28, 1898 (aged 54) Santo Domingo, Dominican Republic
- Resting place: National Pantheon of the Dominican Republic
- Party: Blue Party
- Parent(s): María de Regla Aristi y Guerrero (mother); Hipólito Billini y Hernández (father)
- Occupation: Activist, politician, writer

Francisco Gregorio Billini y Aristi (May 25, 1844 – November 28, 1898) was a Dominican writer, teacher and politician. Supported by the former president Ulises Heureaux, he won the national elections in 1884, and served as the 23rd president of the Dominican Republic, from September 1, 1884 to May 16, 1885. He resigned in 1885 to avoid creating a civil war as he found opposition, as Gregorio Luperon believed he was Ulises Heureaux puppet and a way of the dictator to maintain political power while Heureaux opposed him when Billini's policies affected his power and interests in the country.

== Family background and early life ==
The son of María de Regla Aristi y Guerrero and Hipólito Billini y Hernández, his grandfather Juan Antonio Billini y Ruse, a native of Piedmont, Italy, arrived on the island of Santo Domingo with the 1802 French troops commanded by General Charles Leclerc (Napoleon's brother in law) in order to reassert control over a slave rebellion on the western side of the island (now Haiti), eventually capturing and deporting Toussaint Louverture.

Young Billini did his primary and secondary education in his hometown in the College of Father Boneau, where he learned to write in Latin and Italian (he also spoke Italian perfectly, having learned from his Italian grandfather as a boy). He went to the Theological Seminary St. Thomas Aquinas where he was a disciple of Fernando Arturo de Merino.

He was the nephew of Francisco Xavier Billini, known in the Dominican Republic as "Padre Billini" (Father Billini) who founded in 1882 the still running National Lottery of the Dominican Republic.

== Political career ==
Motivated by his militancy in the Blue Party and his conviction that the country should preserve its independence, he participated at the age of 21 in the Dominican Restoration War, that ended in 1865. During the War he was trapped by the Spanish troops and in 1865 was exchanged in Puerto Plata after a treaty was made between the Dominican and Spanish troops.

After the Restoration War ended, the Dominican Republic experienced some years of political turmoil, which ended when Buenaventura Baez started his so called "6 year government". Billini was known as one of the primary opponents of Buenaventura Baez government, first through publications and later as part of an armed rebellion against Baez. This costed him the exile in 1868.

On his return to the country he served as a civil servant becoming Representative for Azua (1874), Minister of Finance (1878), Minister of War and Navy (1880). He was Vice President of the Dominican Republic from 5 March to 8 July 1878 in the cabinet of Cesareo Guillermo. He was the president of the Senate of the Dominican Republic in 1878-1879. Later he announced intentions to become President of the Dominican Republic.

=== Presidency ===
In 1884, after a close electoral contest in which he beat Casimiro Nemesio de Moya, he was elected President of the Republic. He took office on September 1, 1884 and resigned on May 16, 1885. His unexpected resignation puzzled many of his followers. His last words as president were:

I think it is a good example to be giving my resignation spontaneously and disappearing into the shadows of my house, without petty aspirations for the future.

== Other works and legacy ==
He founded the newspaper El Eco de la Opinion (March 1879), which circulated for over twenty years and became the paradigm of a thoughtful journalism combined with detailed news reviews. He collaborated regularly with El Nacional, El Cable, Letras y Ciencias, El Mensajero and El Patriota.

Before he was president, he published the novel Amor y Expiacion in 1882, however the most important contributions of Billini to the Dominican national literature is the novel Baní or Engracia and Antoñita (1892), which prosecutes the political-social behavior and customs of nineteenth-century banilejos.

He died in Santo Domingo on 28 November 1898. In 1998 his remains were transferred to the National Pantheon in Santo Domingo by order of President Leonel Fernandez. Currently one of the stations of the Santo Domingo Metro carries his name.

Political offices
Preceded by Juan Isidro Ortea y Kennedy	Vice President of the Dominican Republic; 1878	Succeeded by Casimiro Nemesio de Moya
Preceded by Ulises Heureaux	President of the Dominican Republic; 1884–1885	Succeeded by Alejandro Woss y Gil
