= Horacio Vásquez =

President of the Dominican Republic (1860–1936)

Mr. President Horacio Vásquez
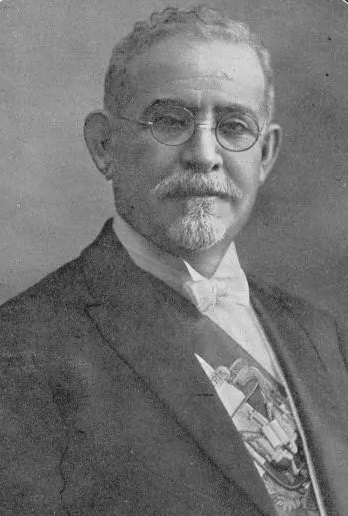

President of the Dominican Republic
- In office July 24, 1924 – March 3, 1930
- Vice President: Federico Velázquez (1924–1928); José Dolores Alfonseca (1928–1930)
- Preceded by: Juan Bautista Vicini (provisional)
- Succeeded by: Rafael Estrella Ureña (acting)

President of the Provisional Government Junta of the Dominican Republic
- In office May 2, 1902 – April 23, 1903
- Vice President: None
- Preceded by: Juan Isidro Jimenes
- Succeeded by: Alejandro Woss y Gil

President of the Provisional Government Junta of the Dominican Republic
- In office September 4, 1899 – November 15, 1899
- Vice President: None
- Preceded by: Wenceslao Figuereo
- Succeeded by: Juan Isidro Jimenes

Vice President of the Dominican Republic
- In office November 15, 1899 – May 2, 1902
- President: Juan Isidro Jimenes Pereyra
- Preceded by: Wenceslao Figuereo
- Succeeded by: Eugenio Deschamps Peña

Personal details
- Born: October 22, 1860 Dominican Republic
- Died: March 25, 1936 (aged 75) Espaillat province, Dominican Republic
- Party: Red Party
- Spouse: Trina de Moya (m. 1888)

Felipe Horacio Vásquez Lajara (October 22, 1860 – March 25, 1936) was a Dominican Republic military general and political figure who was President of the Dominican Republic from 1924 to 1930.

He was part of the conspiracy to assassinate Dominican Republic dictator Ulises Heureaux in 1889. He was subsequently the president of the Provisional Government Junta of the Dominican Republic for two months in 1899 before serving as Vice President of the DR from November 1899 to 1902. Between 1902 and 1903, he was again president of the Provisional Government Junta of the Dominican Republic.

Supporters of Vásquez were known as Horacistas, as opposed to Jimenistas, supporters of Vásquez's main rival, Juan Isidro Jimenes, and Lilisistas, supporters of the murdered dictator Heureaux. He ran for a full term as president in 1914, but lost to Jimenes. Following the occupation of the Dominican Republic by U.S. military forces from 1916–1924, Vásquez was democratically elected as president of the country and served between 1924 and 1930, and again separately in 1930 before being ousted by General Rafael Trujillo and sent into exile in Puerto Rico.

In 1888, Vásquez married Trina de Moya, a poet and writer from La Vega. A metro station in Santo Domingo is named after him.

== Early life ==
Horacio Vásquez was born on October 22, 1860, in the city of Moca in the Cibao region. His parents were Basilio Vásquez Lizardo (son of the Spanish Ramón Vásquez and the Mocana María Lizardo Caba) and Ramona Lajara Gómez (daughter of the Azuano Pedro Lajara and Tomasa Gómez).

Vásquez acquired important knowledge, as a young adult he dedicated himself to agricultural and commercial work, frequently traveling to La Vega, where he was related to his socially important family. A man of great stature and a strong physical presence, he quickly gained the popularity from people who especially appreciated him for his serenity, the rectitude of his conduct, his intellectual conditions and his distinguished bearing.

Horacio Vásquez was 26 years old when he entered politics a few days after the Moya Revolution broke out. When the city of La Vega was attacked by insurgent troops, he stood out in its defense, showing solidarity and fighting for the government headed by Alejandro Woss and Gil.

== Political career ==
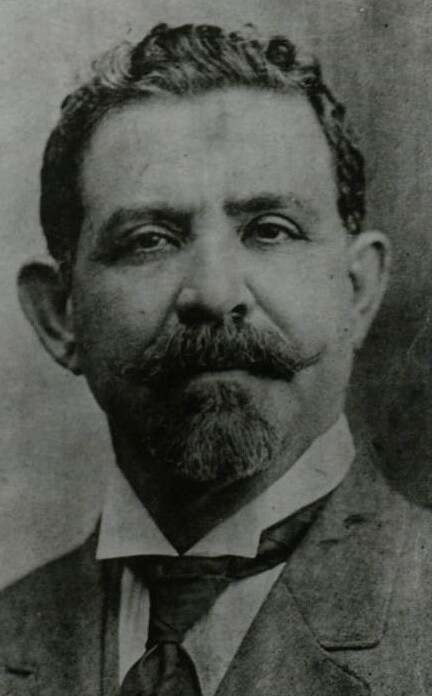
Horacio Vásquez in 1903.

In the military coup of 1902, Vásquez expelled President Jiménez, dissolved the congress and assumed power under the legal form of "Provisional President" with the support of the National Party and without naming a vice president. In 1903, faced with a chaotic situation in the economy and the threat of intervention by the United States, a coup d'état overthrew General Vásquez, who after several weeks of fighting, resigned as president of the provisional government in April 1903.

His cousin, Ramon Caceres, was president from 1906 to 1911.

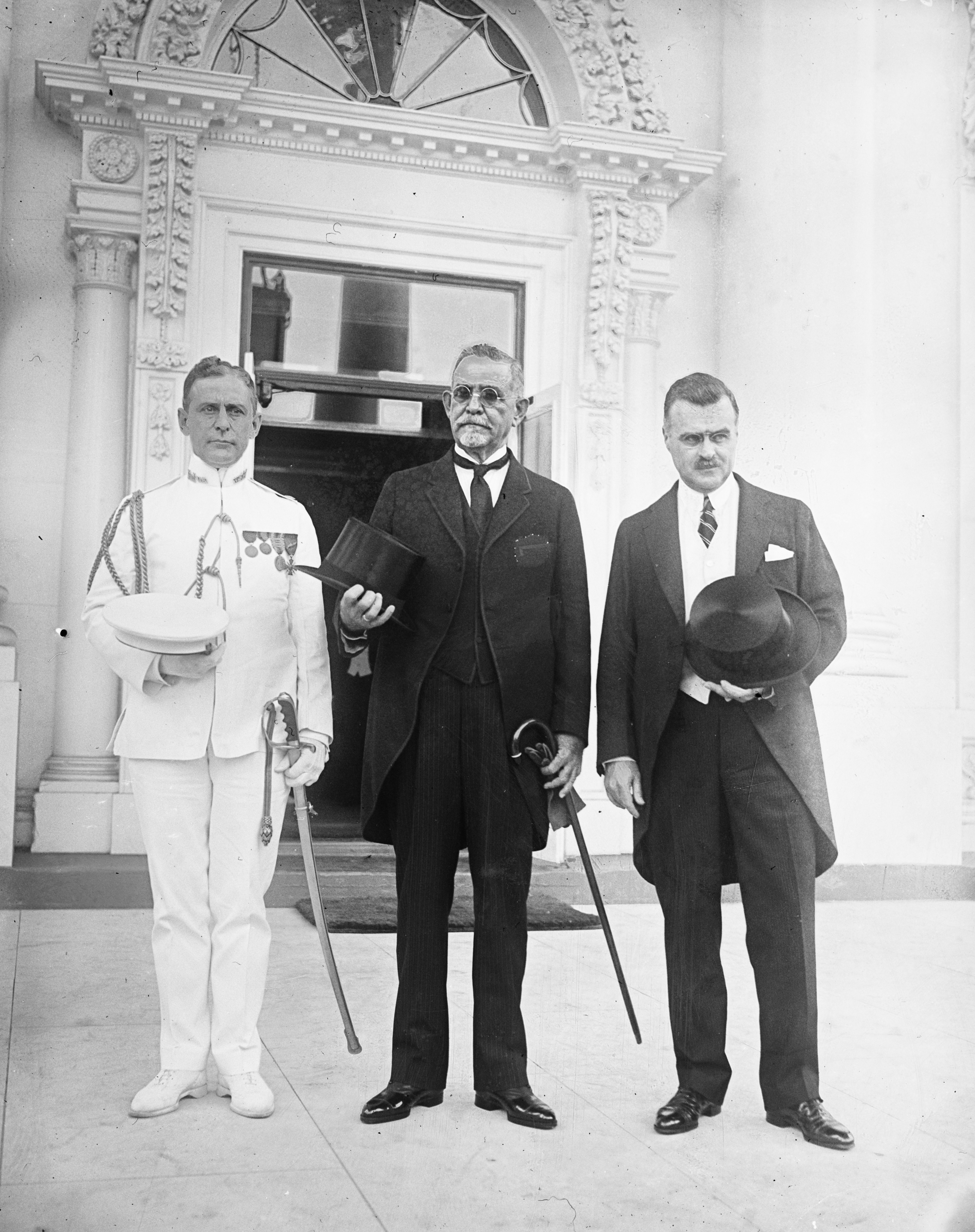
Horacio Vásquez (center) in 1924.

After the American occupation of 1916 until 1924 he returned to occupy the presidency of the Republic, after elections were held and with the approval of the American troops who withdrew from the island. He was elected president for the period 1924–1928 with 69.8% of the votes, but the forced extension of his mandate until 1930 and his eventual reelection caused a revolt by the National Guard, led by Rafael Trujillo, that overthrew Vásquez in 1930.

Vásquez's supporters were known as Horacistas, unlike the Jimenistas, supporters of Vásquez's main rival.

Political offices
Preceded by Wenceslao Figuereo	Vice President of the Dominican Republic; 1899–1902	Succeeded by Eugenio Deschamps Peña
Preceded by Juan Bautista Vicini	President of the Dominican Republic; 1924–1930	Succeeded by Rafael Estrella Ureña
