= Segundo Imbert =

Dominican politician; 17th Vice President of the Dominican Republic (1887–1889)

Brigadier General Segundo Francisco Imbert del Monte (May 12, 1837 – October 16, 1905) was a Dominican military figure and politician; he was Vice President of the Dominican Republic, Foreign minister, and was candidate for the Presidency of the Dominican Republic.

== Family ==
Imbert was born to José María Imbert and María Francisca del Monte; His father, of French descent, was mayor of Moca during the Haitian occupation period from 1822 to 1844. He was born in that city and settled in Puerto Plata since the First Republic, appearing in the regiment of that place as a lieutenant.

He married Manuela Mesnier (whose father was French). He was the paternal grandfather of General Antonio Imbert Barrera.

== Dominican Restoration War ==
When the Grito del Capotillo (Cry of Capotillo) was given in 1863, he joined the ranks of the restorers opposed to the annexation to Spain, even participating in several campaigns of the Dominican Restoration War. As an assistant to General José Cabrera, he obtained the rank of colonel.

== Later years and death ==
He was Minister of Justice and Public Instruction in the government of Cesáreo Guillermo (1878). In the biennium of Ulises Heureaux (1882-1884) he was interim Minister of War and Navy (1882) and of the Interior and Police (1882 and 1883), and also Minister of Foreign Affairs. Between 1887 and 1889 he served as vice president of the Republic.

His liberal principles led him to join the blue party, which he served with absolute fidelity in defense of the interests of the Dominican people. He remained by Gregorio Luperón's side in all his patriotic actions both in the country and in exile. During the course of the various revolutionary conspiracies that were carried out abroad to overthrow the Six Years regime of Buenaventura Báez, he was one of the few who refused to receive gifts and privileges. He accompanied Luperón on the expedition of the steamship El Telégrafo that began in the Bay of Saint-Marc, Haiti, and was among the 45 Dominicans who entered the national territory through the hills of the Haitian Capotillo to combat Báez's intentions to annex the Dominican Republic to the United States. As governor of Puerto Plata, he acted with rectitude and probity. In the 1884 elections, Imbert ran as a candidate for the presidency of the Republic along with Casimiro de Moya as vice president. His adversaries were Francisco Gregorio Billini and Alejandro Woss y Gil. The polls favored the first, but Ulises Heureaux entered 15,000 votes and Congress proclaimed the second winners. Two years later, he again participated in the elections as a candidate for Vice President and his ticket won. Once the civil war of those days ended, in which he defended the Government, he retired to private life because he did not agree with Heureaux's policy, and established his residence in Puerto Plata.

Political offices
Preceded by Alejandro Woss y Gil	Vice President of the Dominican Republic; 1887–1889	Succeeded by Manuel María Gautier
