= Wenceslao Figuereo =

Dominican politician

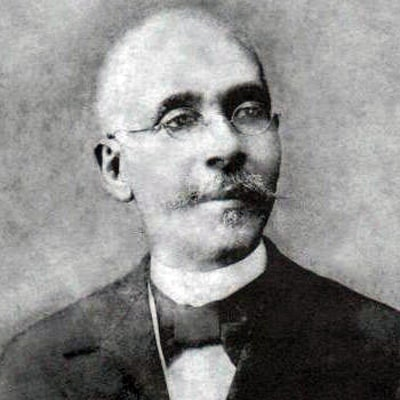
Wenceslao Figuereo

Wenceslao "Mano Lao" Figuereo Cassó (1834 – January 10, 1910) was a Dominican Republic politician. He joined the Los Bolos party politician as a young man. Figuereo was Vice President of the Dominican Republic under President Ulises Heureaux. Figuereo became President of the Dominican Republic on July 26, 1899, following the assassination of Heureaux. Figuereo was ousted from office on 30 August 1899 in a coup.

== Early life ==
Figuereo was born in San Juan de la Maguana in 1834.

He was born to a half-Taino and half-African enslaved woman by the name of Simona. His father was of noble descent, a plantation owner and slave driver named Telésforo Objío Noble. Objío Noble would later free Simona and Wenceslao and properly partner Simona. Simona changed her name to Catalina when adopted into formal society. Wenceslao, having a strained relationship with Telésforo, would be taken in by the Figuereo plantation and mentored from an early age by the Los Bolos political party.

Figuereo's father and Brigadier General Manuel Rodríguez Objío's mother were siblings, thus, Figuereo and Rodríguez Objío were first cousins.

== Military career ==
He was 14 years old when he was part of the Dominican army that fought to strengthen the independence threatened by Haiti. Illiterate, he learned to read and count helped by a soldier during the campaign against Emperor Faustin Soulouque. When the Dominican War of Independence ended in 1856, he was a corporal and, during the period of the annexation to Spain, he was promoted to captain. Guard officer who guarded the insurgents sentenced to death on July 3, 1861, he gave Francisco del Rosario Sánchez a copy of Father Barrientos' Bible to help him die.

== Later career ==
He was a follower of José María Cabral, who, being president of the Republic, appointed him governor of Azua. For personal reasons, he joined the Red Party, under Buenaventura Báez. In 1876, Cesáreo Guillermo, in charge of the Executive Branch, appointed him Minister of the Interior and Police. Later, in his desire to stay at the top, he joined the liberal party, fighting alongside Ulises Heureaux against Guillermo, who had spoken out in Azua in 1885.

The following year, on the occasion of the revolution of Casimiro de Moya, who had taken up arms against Heureaux for the electoral fraud that took the Presidency from him, he fought for him in the south, so, after the rebellion was defeated and he was promoted Heureaux to power, was rewarded with the same ministry and then with the Vice Presidency. During the tyranny of his boss, he protected many young people from the capital.

With Lilís dead, he rejected an offer of money and weapons made to him by Santo Domingo Improvement in exchange for recognizing his large account. On March 23, 1903, when a coup d'état took place against the Government of Horacio Vásquez, Figuereo took charge of the assault on the Government.

== Final years and death ==
Figuereo was married to María Isabel Balbina Juanes Sánchez, who became the country's first lady at the age of 64. She remains the oldest woman to become first lady in the Dominican Republic's history.

In 1900 he exiled to Madrid, Spain.

In a combat that occurred in the town of Guerra, he was mortally wounded in 1910, in Santo Domingo, Dominican Republic. He would succumb to his injury before finally dying that same year at age 76.

Political offices
Preceded by Manuel María Gautier	Vice President of the Dominican Republic; 1893–1899	Succeeded by Horacio Vásquez
