= Ramón Cáceres =

31st president of the Dominican Republic (1906–11)

Mr. President Ramón Cáceres
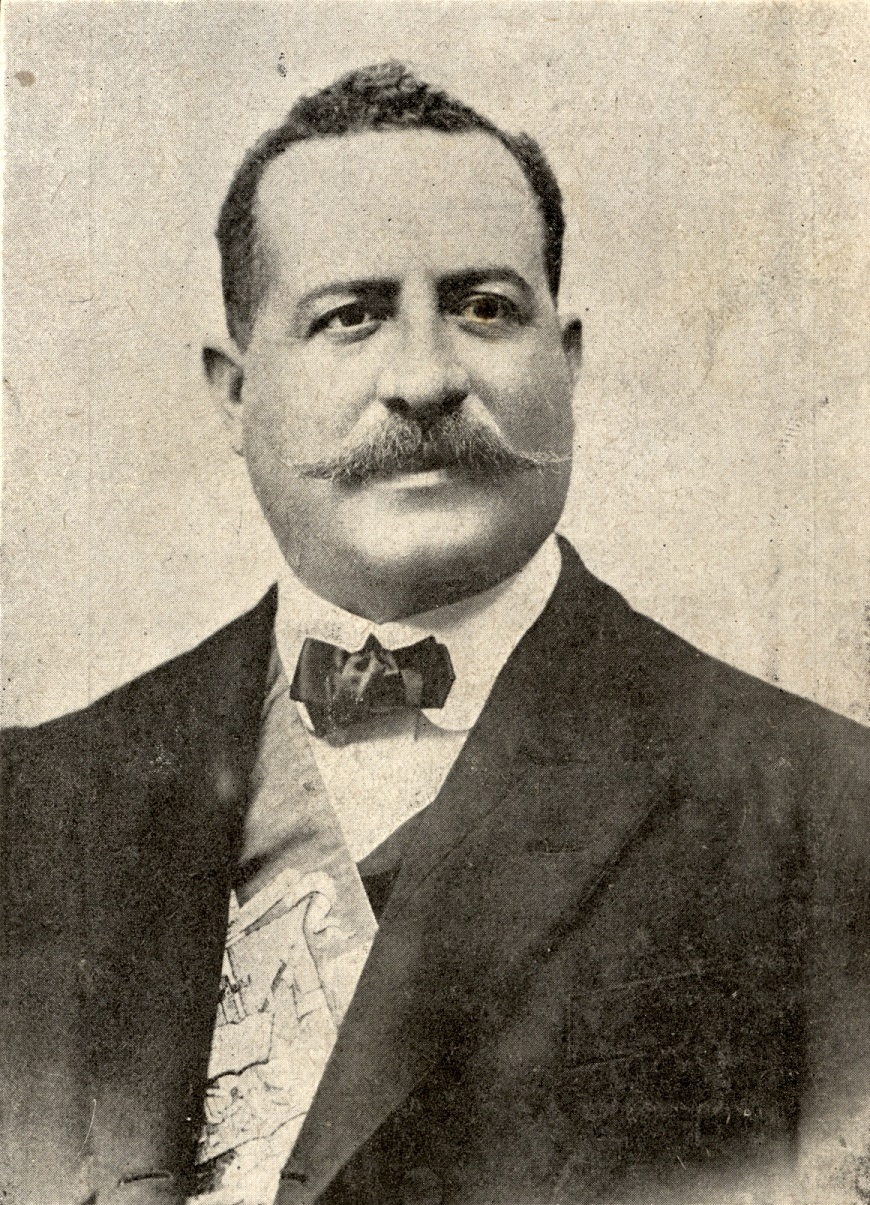

31st President of the Dominican Republic
- In office 12 January 1906 – 19 November 1911
- Preceded by: Carlos Felipe Morales
- Succeeded by: Council of Secretaries of State

18th Vice President of the Dominican Republic
- In office November 24, 1903 – December 29, 1905
- Preceded by: Eugenio Deschamps Peña
- Succeeded by: Position abolished

Personal details
- Born: December 15, 1866 Moca, Dominican Republic
- Died: November 19, 1911 (aged 44) Santo Domingo, Dominican Republic
- Party: Red Party
- Spouse: Narcisa Ureña Valencia
- Profession: Lawyer and Politician

Ramón Arturo Cáceres Vasquez (December 15, 1866, Moca, Dominican Republic – November 19, 1911, Santo Domingo), nicknamed Mon Cáceres, was a Dominican Republic politician and minister of the Armed Forces. He was the 31st president of the Dominican Republic (1906–1911). He served as vice president under Carlos Felipe Morales until assuming office in 1906. Cáceres was the leader of the right-wing Red Party.

Cáceres was assassinated in 1911 after being ambushed by rebels and killed in his car. His death was followed by a civil war and, ultimately, by the U.S. occupation of the Dominican Republic in 1916.

A metro station in Santo Domingo is named after him.

== Early life ==
Ramón Cáceres was born in the Cibao region in the town of Moca, Espaillat. His father was Manuel Altagracia Cáceres, a former president of the Dominican Republic, and his mother was Remigia Vásquez. He participated in politics during his youth and studied law. Cáceres was known for his physical strength, as well as being a great horseman and an expert marksman.

== Political career ==
Cáceres participated in the execution of the president Ulises Heureaux (Lilís) on July 26, 1899 in the city of Moca. Cáceres later became the constitutional President of the Republic. During his mandate, the 1907 Dominican American Convention is signed. In 1907 he promulgated a new Constitution, by virtue of which he was re-elected in 1908.

From the beginning of his government, Cáceres, like his predecessors, had to face groups that sought to overthrow him. One of the most important guerilla outbreaks that occurred was that of the Northwest Line, led by the jimenista Desiderio Arias who maintained absolute control of the area. (Demetrio Rodríguez had fallen in Puerto Plata on January 3, 9 days before Cáceres officially assumed the Presidency on January 12, 1906.) To deal with this situation, Cáceres moved to Monte Cristi with his troops and military advisers. It practically devastated that area, concentrating the food supply in certain places and ordering the transfer of livestock to the interior of the Cibao within 20 days. Part of the population submitted to the measures, while many others strongly opposed him. Agricultural and livestock activities were affected. However, President Cáceres managed to control the insurgents. He used the same methods in the southern region, managing to repress the leaders of that area.

One of the tactics used by Cáceres was to send emissaries to the places where the regional leaders were most powerful, with the instruction that they meet in a neutral place to achieve a peace agreement. This meeting was a trap, the opposing leaders, present there, were finally surrounded by the army and eliminated from the road. During Cáceres's mandate, great importance was given to military affairs. He created a professional army to replace the private armies that led various regional leaders. Along with this army, he reorganized the Rural Guard created during the Morales government and turned it into a police force for the entire country, calling it the Republican Guard, also popularly called the Mon Guard. It was characterized because it imposed its authority and was faithful to the President.

Because there were many sectors that did not support his government, various plots were formed against him, and on November 19, 1911, a group led by Luis Tejera intercepted the car in which he used to ride with one of his women. When the car in which Ramón Cáceres was driving approached the group, there was a shooting. President Cáceres was shot several times and killed by the General Luís Tejera, who was later taken to the Ozama Fortress where he was executed.

Cáceres's cousin, Horacio Vásquez, also served as President of the Dominican Republic.

== See also ==
- Los Coludos

Political offices
Preceded by Eugenio Deschamps Peña	President of the Dominican Republic; 1903–1905	Succeeded by Position abolished
Preceded by Carlos Felipe Morales	President of the Dominican Republic; 1906–1911	Succeeded by Council of Secretaries of State
