= Carlos Morales Languasco =

30th President of the Dominican Republic (1903–1905)

Mr. President Carlos Morales Languasco
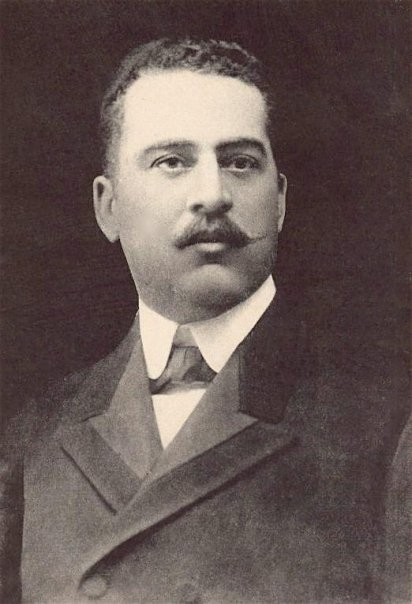

30th President of the Dominican Republic
- In office November 24, 1903 – December 29, 1905
- Vice President: Ramón Cáceres
- Preceded by: Alejandro Woss y Gil
- Succeeded by: Council of Secretaries of State

Personal details
- Born: August 23, 1868 Puerto Plata, Dominican Republic
- Died: March 1, 1914 (aged 45) Paris, France
- Party: Red Party
- Spouse: Aurelia Castellanos Pelegrín
- Parents: Agustín Morales Robainne (1839–1893) (father); Isabel Elizabeth Languasco Chevalier (1832–1905) (mother)
- Profession: Military Officer and Politician

Carlos Felipe Morales Languasco (23 August 1867 – 1 March 1914) was a Dominican priest, politician and military figure who was President of the Dominican Republic from 1903 to 1905.

== Early life ==
Carlos Felipe Morales Languasco was born in Puerto Plata Province, on 23 August 1868, to Carlos Felipe Morales and Isabel Languasco de Morales. He was educated at the San Luis Gonzaga School and Fernando Arturo de Meriño was one of his teachers. He was ordained as a priest in 1891, but left the priesthood in order to become a politician in 1900.

== Political career ==
Morales retired from priesthood to engage in politics. He was the President of Chamber of Deputies of the Dominican Republic in 1901.

Morales was appointed governor of Puerto Plata after President Juan Isidro Jimenes was overthrown in 1902. As governor he worked with the United States to overthrow Alejandro Woss y Gil in 1903, and became president. He formed a provisional government on 6 December, and held elections in 1904. Morales, with Ramón Cáceres as his running mate, won the 1904 election as he was the only candidate.

He was president of the Dominican Republic from November 24, 1903 until his resignation on December 29, 1905. As President, he sought protectorate status for the Dominican Republic under the United States.

In Paris, Morales flew in the Sallard N-1 at the Vidamée aerodrome on 7 December 1913, becoming the first Dominican to fly in an airplane.

== Personal life ==
Morales married Aurelia Castellano. Morales died in Paris on 1 March 1914, and was buried in Puerto Plata on 12 April.

== Ancestry ==
Ancestors of Carlos Morales Languasco

4. Agustín Morales Brito (1806−1869); Lanzarote, Spain
2. Agustín Morales Robainne (1839–1893); Saint Thomas, Danish Virgin Islands
5. Rovisa Rossetta Robainne (1803–1857); Saint Thomas
1. Carlos Felipe Morales Languasco (1867−1914); Puerto Plata, Dominican Republic
6. Agustín Languasco; Oneglia, Kingdom of Sardinia-Piedmont
3. Isabel Languasco Chevalier (1832–1905); Puerto Plata
7. Nicolasa Chevalier Bonne; Puerto Plata

Sources:
- Larrazábal Blanco, Carlos. Familias Dominicanas (in Spanish). Santo Domingo: Academia Dominicana de la Historia.

== Works cited ==
- "Un día como hoy muere el expresidente Carlos Morales Languasco". El Nacional. 1 March 2018. Archived from the original on 5 March 2018.
- Tineo, Héctor. "Carlos Morales Languasco nació en Puerto Plata". Dominican Liberation Party. Archived from the original on 2 May 2026.
