= Charlie Mariotti =

The Most Excellent Charles Mariotti

Senator for the province of Monte Plata
- In office 16 August 2006 – 16 August 2020
- Preceded by: Ramón Alburquerque (PRD)
- Succeeded by: Lenin Valdez López (PRM)

Personal details
- Born: 10 March 1958 (age 68) Las Matas de Farfán, San Juan Province, Dominican Republic
- Party: Dominican Liberation’s Party
- Spouse: Margarita Paz
- Children: 4
- Parent(s): Charles Noel Mariotti Martini, Enoé Liliana Tapia Suero
- Education: Universidad Pedro Henríquez Ureña (Juris Doctor); Pontificia Universidad Católica Madre y Maestra
- Committees: President – "Committee on Industry, Trade and Free Zones"
- Ethnicity: White Dominican
- Net worth: ▲RD$ 68.09 million (2010) (US$ 1.84 million)

Charles Noel Mariotti Tapia (born 10 March 1958) is a Dominican Republic politician, manager, and broadcaster. He served as a senator of the Dominican Republic from 2006 to 2020.

== Early life and family ==
Mariotti was born in Las Matas de Farfán to Charles N. Mariotti Martini, a Corsican-Dominican agronomist, and Enoé L. Tapia Suero. By his mother, Mariotti is descended from Timoteo Ogando, who is considered a Dominican independence war hero against Haiti, and from the Dominican President Ulises Heureaux (Heureaux was Ogando’s son-in-law, and Mariotti’s great-great-grandfather). His son, Charles Mariotti III, is also a politician.

Ancestors of Charlie Mariotti

8. (France) Ignazio Mariotti
4. (Dominican Republic) François Mariotti Pasqualini (Puerto Plata, 1896– ?)
9. (France) Rossina Pasqualini
2. (Dominican Republic) Charles Noel Mariotti Martini (Puerto Plata, 19 Jan 1933–Santo Domingo, 9 Jan 2012)
10. (France) Alfred Martini
5. (Dominican Republic) Josefina Martini (Puerto Plata, 1900–Santo Domingo, 16 Aug 1981)
1. (Dominican Republic) Charles Noel Mariotti Tapia (Las Matas de Farfán, 10 Mar 1958)
6. (Dominican Republic) Arturo Alberto Tapia
3. (Dominican Republic) Enoe Liliana Tapia Suero (Las Matas de Farfán)
28. (Dominican Republic) Félix Damián Suero Castillo
14. (Dominican Republic) Camilo Manuel Suero Alcántara (Las Matas de Farfán – San Juan, 1907)
7. (Dominican Republic) Aída Celeste Suero Heureaux (Las Matas de Farfán)
30. (Dominican Republic) President Ulises Hilarión Heureaux Levert (Puerto Plata, 1845–Moca, 1899)
15. (Dominican Republic) Rosa Heureaux Ogando
31. (Dominican Republic) Juana Ogando Encarnación

== Politics ==
Mariotti served as Civil-Governor of Monte Plata from 1998 to 2000. Mariotti was also President of the Italy-Dominican Republic Parliamentary Association.

Mariotti was elected Senator for the province of Monte Plata in 2006 and subsequently re-elected in 2010 and 2016.

== Media ==
Radio

- "Botando el Golpe", with Jochy Santos
- "Solo para Mujeres"
- "Gadejo y Algo Más"
- "El Matutino de Rumba"
