= Alejandro Woss y Gil =

32nd and 38th President of the Dominican Republic (1856–1932)

Mr. President Alejandro Woss y Gil
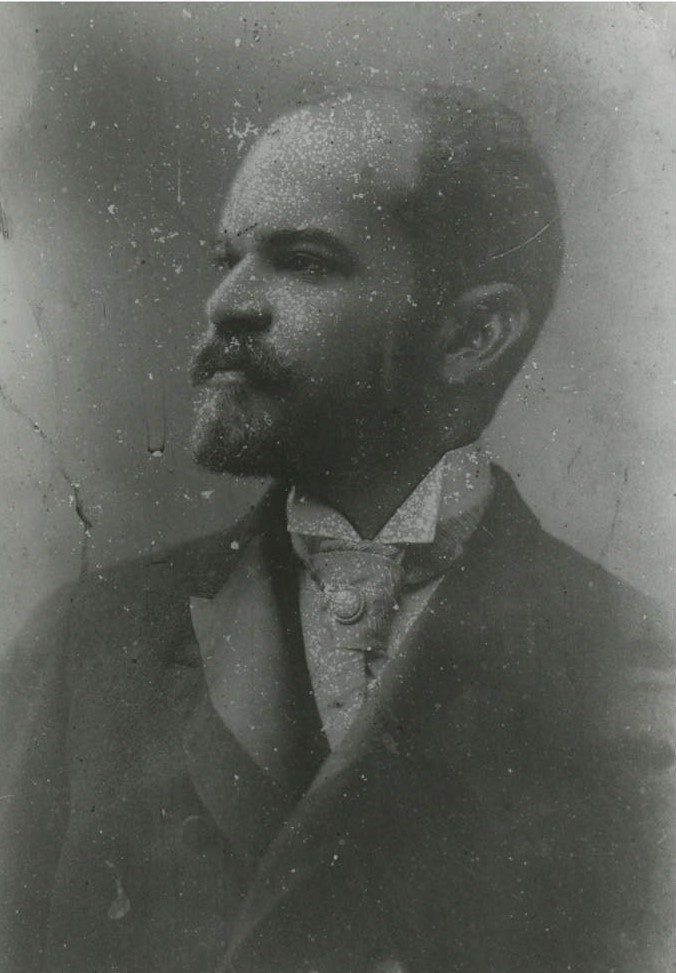

32nd President of the Dominican Republic
- In office May 16, 1885 – January 6, 1887
- Preceded by: Francisco Gregorio Billini
- Succeeded by: Ulises Heureaux

38th President of the Dominican Republic
- In office April 23, 1903 – November 24, 1903
- Vice President: Eugenio Deschamps Peña
- Preceded by: Horacio Vásquez
- Succeeded by: Carlos Felipe Morales

Vice President of the Dominican Republic
- In office 1884–1885
- President: Francisco Gregorio Billini
- Preceded by: Casimiro Nemesio de Moya
- Succeeded by: Segundo Imbert

Personal details
- Born: May 5, 1856 El Seibo, Dominican Republic
- Died: January 1, 1932 (aged 75) Santo Domingo, Dominican Republic
- Party: Blue Party
- Spouse: María Ricart Pérez

Alejandro Woss y Gil (born Alejandro Woss Linares) (May 5, 1856 – January 1, 1932) was a Dominican politician and military figure.

He was born in El Seibo on May 5, 1856, to parents, Carlos Woss and María Linares. At a young age he was sent Santiago de los Caballeros to live with his uncle Gen. Evangelista Gil, who adopted him and encouraged to enter military service.

Woss y Gil served as Minister of Defense and as vice president during the presidency of Francisco Gregorio Billini, whom he replaced after his resignation from May 16, 1885, until January 6, 1887. Former president Ulises Heureaux remained the dominant figure in national politics. In 1903, he led a coup against Juan Isidro Jimenes and served again as president from March 23 until he was removed by Carlos Felipe Morales on October 24, 1903.

Woss was married to María Altagracia Ricart. Together, the couple had three children: Ana María, Francisco, and Celeste Woss y Gil, who became a noted painter and artist.

He died in Santo Domingo in January 1932.

Political offices
Preceded by Casimiro Nemesio de Moya	Vice President of the Dominican Republic; 1884–1885	Succeeded by Segundo Francisco Imbert del Monte
Preceded by Francisco Gregorio Billini	President of the Dominican Republic; 1885–1887	Succeeded by Ulises Heureaux
Preceded by Horacio Vásquez	President of the Dominican Republic; 1903	Succeeded by Carlos Felipe Morales
