= Dominican presidential line of succession =

The Dominican presidential line of succession defines who may become or act as Constitutional President of the Dominican Republic upon the incapacity, resignation, death or by judge trial of a current President.

== Current order ==
The Presidential line of succession, as specified by the Constitution 2010 in the article 129.

The Constitution was changed in 2015.

The current office-holder is in parentheses:

Current President: Luis Abinader

| # | Office | Current Officer |
|---|---|---|
| 1 | Vice President | Raquel Peña |
| 2 | President of the Supreme Court of Justice | Justiniano Montero Montero |
