= Manuel María Gautier =

Dominican politician and diplomat (1830–1897)

Manuel María de la Concepción Gautier (December 8, 1830 – May 24, 1897) was a politician from the Dominican Republic. He served as the acting president of the Dominican Republic from February 27 to April 30, 1889 and later as Vice President of the Dominican Republic from 1889 to 1893.

He was Minister of Finance of the Dominican Republic in 1876.

== Biography ==
Gautier was born in Santo Domingo on December 8, 1830, during the Haitian occupation period. He fought against Haiti's invasions of Dominican territory. He worked as an accountant for the corvette Cibao and in 1856, he was secretary of General Felipe Alfau.

He was a fighter against the Annexation of the Republic to Spain. He is even credited with being the author of a pamphlet with the title The Betrayal of General Pedro Santana, in which he attacks President Pedro Santana's decision to annex the country to Spain in 1861.

When in the same year the hero Francisco del Rosario Sánchez and José María Cabral led a Movement that entered the country through the Haitian border, Manuel María Gautier represented Sánchez before the Government of the neighboring Republic.

After the Republic was restored, the journalist and politician Manuel María Gautier stood out as a collaborator of President Buenaventura Báez and contributed to strengthening his leadership.

He died in the city of Santo Domingo in 1897.

Political offices
Preceded by Segundo Francisco Imbert del Monte	Vice President of the Dominican Republic; 1889–1893	Succeeded by Wenceslao Figuereo
