= Fernando Arturo de Meriño =

29th President of the Dominican Republic (1880–1882)

Fernando Antonio Arturo de Meriño y Ramírez
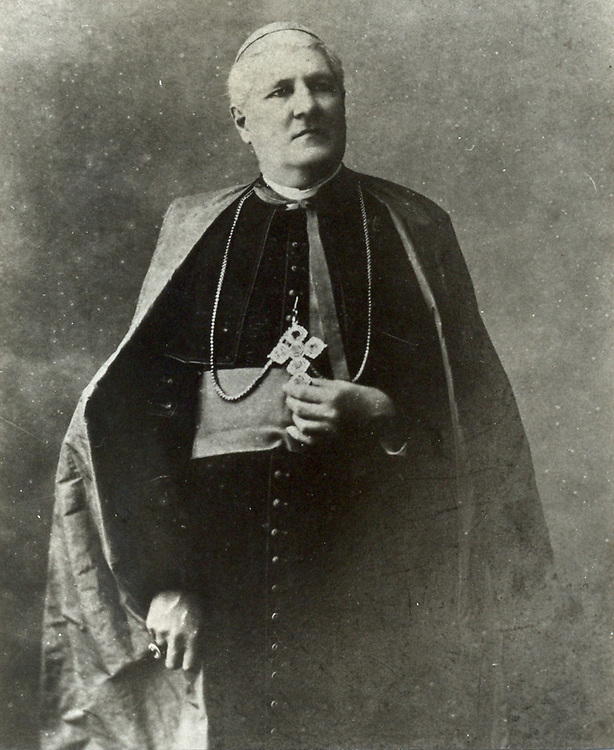

29th President of the Dominican Republic
- In office September 1, 1880 – September 1, 1882
- Preceded by: Gregorio Luperón
- Succeeded by: Ulises Heureaux

45th Archbishop of Santo Domingo
- In office July 3, 1885 – August 20, 1906
- Preceded by: Bienvenido Monzón
- Succeeded by: Adolfo Alejandro Nouel

Personal details
- Born: January 9, 1833 Antoncí, Hayti (now Antoncí, Dominican Republic)
- Died: August 20, 1906 (age 73) Santo Domingo, Dominican Republic
- Party: Blue Party

Father Fernando Arturo de Meriño y Ramírez (January 9, 1833 – August 20, 1906) was a Dominican priest and politician. He served as the 29th President of the Dominican Republic from September 1, 1880, until September 1, 1882. He served as the President of Chamber of Deputies of the Dominican Republic in 1878 and 1883. He was later made an archbishop.

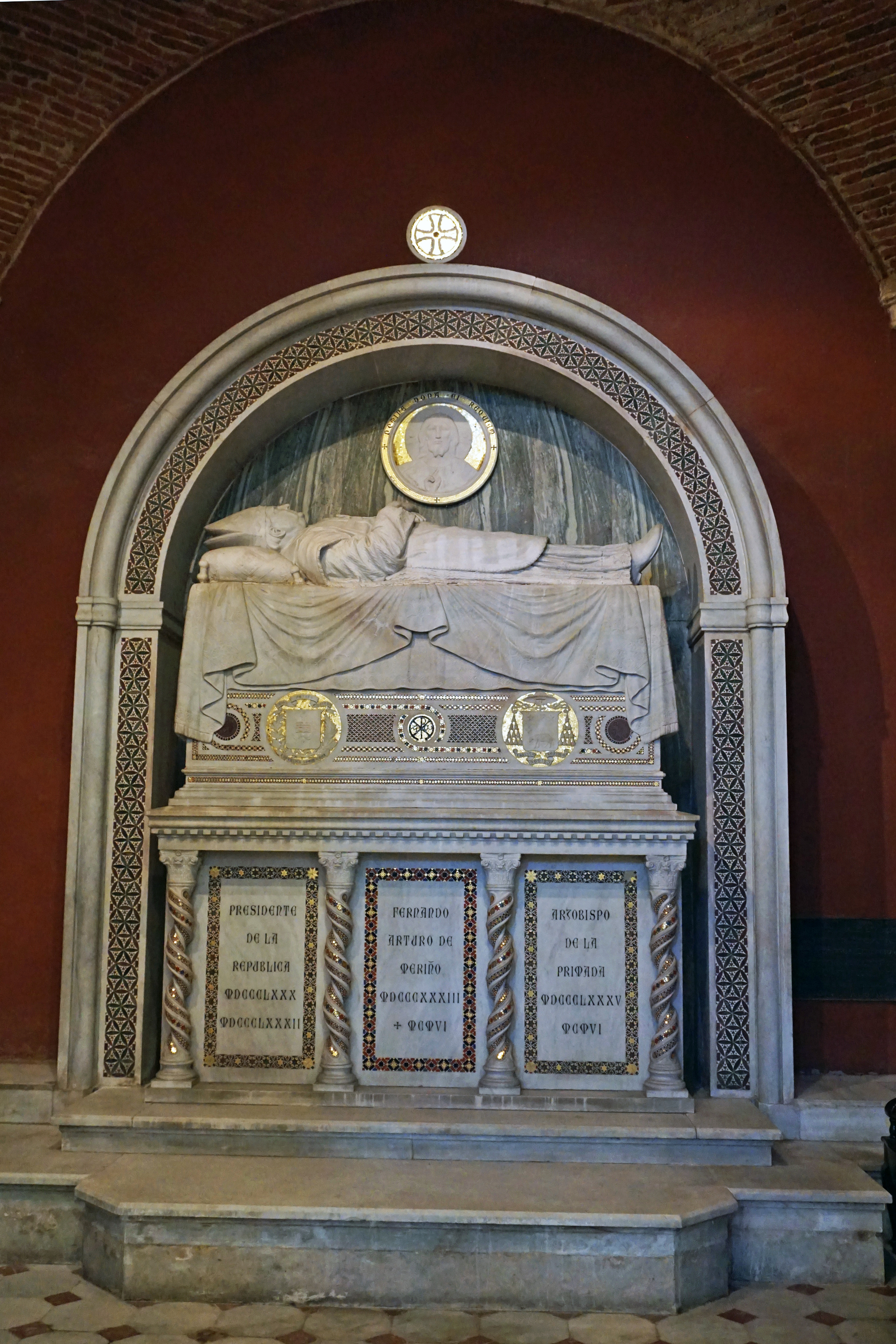
Archobishop Meriño's tomb at Catedral Primada de América at Santo Domingo Colonial City.

== Origins ==
Meriño was born in Antoncí, in the area of Ozama on January 9, 1833, during the time of Haitian rule in the Dominican Republic.

His parents were livestock owners, known as hateros. His father, Pedro de Meriño, was a descendant of Canarian colonists who immigrated the 18th century.

At the age of 11 he moved to San Carlos – a town near Santo Domingo – to further his education. He has reported these early years were surrounded by the deprivation. (Buenaventura Báez, in response to an attack that Meriño directed at him at the end of 1865, commented angrily that he had never had to sell pigeons on the streets in his childhood). Meriño was admitted to the first class of the Seminary of Saint Thomas of Aquinas, founded by Archbishop Tomás de Portes Infante in 1848. Among his companions, some would later influence ecclesiastical circles. The new seminarian benefited from the protection of the archbishop, who welcomed him into his own home and got him a meager stipend in exchange for services in the cathedral. His education continued with attendance at chairs at the San Buenaventura school – created by President Báez during his first administration. Also at this school he made friends with students who would later rise to other top positions, such as Manuel de Jesús Galván. He was ordained on April 24, 1856, and was sent to serve in Neiba.

== Political involvement ==
=== Criticism of Pedro Santana ===
During those years, General Pedro Santana, who had replaced Buenaventura Báez, held the presidency of the first Dominican Republic. While one of the ingredients of the Báez presidency had been the establishment of cordial relations with the priesthood, Santana did not care to keep them appeased - forcing Archbishop Portes to swear the constitution, considered by him to be atheistic for stating the independence of the State. The confrontation reached such levels that the archbishop lost his mind and had to be replaced by a coadjutor. Meriño was a well known critic of Santana

He was a deputy to the Constituent Assembly of Moca, which drafted the progressive Constitution of that time. Under Santana's protectorate, Meriño was in charge of the Cathedral and Seminary of the City of Santo Domingo by 1858. With the death of Archbishop Portes and, later, that of Father Gaspar Hernández, the way was paved for Meriño to become the head of the church. On February 25, 1859, at the age of 26, he was appointed head of the Catholic Church in the Dominican Republic. Two years later, at the age of 28, in March 1861, Pope Pius IX appointed him Apostolic Administrator of the Diocese of Santo Domingo.

Soon Santana reciprocated the enthusiasm of the cathedral parish priest by promoting him as apostolic delegate, after consultation with the bishop of Curaçao, considered the closest to the country. The appointment was ratified by the Vatican at the first opportunity, an expression of the vacuum left by Portes' absence and the control that the government held. In the provision for this purpose, Meriño received power equivalent to that of the bishops, which placed him with barely 26 years, as the leading figure of the Church in the country.

The priest's vocation for power soon became evident, both over the ecclesiastical apparatus and in politics. Since then, it can be assured, he harbored the goal of consolidating leadership through his elevation to archiepiscopal dignity. It would take many years to achieve the goal, but he persistently linked himself to national politics, always with the aim of strengthening his position in the clergy. In this purpose lay the foundation of the symbiosis between the priest and the politician who would accompany him until his elevation to the prelature in 1885.

It is symptomatic that the first text reproduced in the compilation of one of his works, published in 1906, was the article that appeared in 1859 in La Flor del Ozama, “What is the Catholic Priesthood and how it influences the customs of the people.” In it he justifies the interference of the clergy in politics, in the name of the values he embodied of self-sacrifice, humility and preaching of fraternal union. More importantly, he asserted that the priesthood, due to its connection with the divine, had exclusive control of the truth, for which it was consubstantiated with the values more illustrious, who implicitly placed him above the politician:

The Church of Jesus Christ is the sole possessor of the truth, and the Catholic priest, its minister, is the legitimate dispenser of it; It is he alone who has the proper character to bring it to the nations, and since truth is positive good, the Catholic priest, influencing in the towns, it makes their customs good. In effect, the priest raises his voice against vices and overcomes them practicing the virtues; He is humble and confuses pride; It is charitable and shames selfishness; He is chaste and restrains his lust; It is liberal and destroys greed; He is prudent and silences arrogance; It is sober and drives away drunkenness.

Such positions makes it understandable that his relationship with Santana did not place him in the condition of a puppet, so he looked for ways to consolidate a personal position that would allow him to assert his rights. political conceptions, since then of nationalist orientation. Gradually, he would gradually distance himself from the president. Already at that time, Meriño was convinced that the destiny of the Dominican people had to be associated with national independence and a political order that guaranteed individual freedoms. It is probable that, thanks to his intelligence, he was the one who understood most acutely among the priests that the ecclesiastical institution should put themselves at the service of the national cause and get rid of their conservative burden. This position was expressed in one of his first sermons, as apostolic vicar, delivered on February 27, 1860. He took advantage of the anniversary to praise patriotism and advocate for unity among Dominicans. Both themes questioned the orientations of Santana, whose annexationist position was known and whose egocentrism was above any other consideration. Meriño continued to lead the ecclesiastical institution perhaps because Santana judged that such criticism lacked relevance.

=== Against the annexation ===
When it became public that Santana had decided to annex the Dominican Republic to Spain, Meriño decided to join the open opposition. He apparently took steps behind the scenes to try to prevent the annexation, and even tried to dissuade Santana in an interview they both held. Unfortunately it was too late, and on March 18, 1861, the inhabitants of the capital contemplated the spectacle of lowering their tricolor flag to be replaced by that of the Kingdom of Spain. After the annexation was completed on March 18, 1861, Meriño criticized Santana and the annexation from the pulpit. This forced him to leave the country in April 1862. He moved to Spain and then to Puerto Rico. Later, he was in Venezuela and then in Cuba. Wherever he stayed during his exile, he wrote denunciations of the annexation. Once the Republic was restored, he returned in 1865 and was elected President of the Constituent Assembly. Although lacking the strength to prevent the annexation of 1861, Meriño decided to openly oppose it. A few days before the consummation of the infamy, on February 27, 1861, he gave a speech, in the presence of the tyrant, directed against selfishness, an instinct denounced as the cause of all the evils that afflicted the Republic. He started from a theological consideration to propose how contradictory passions had developed from the moment “the first man fell from the grace of God” and “all miseries invaded him.”

In that piece he put his intellectual capacity and skills into play. oratories. The prelate's cultural training was biased by the theological approach and by a rhetorical style that emphasized brilliance in expression, but he had clear considerations about the Dominican reality, which allowed him to integrate theology with liberalism. However, he did not offer an original interpretation of Dominican history. His political oratory, as brilliant as it became, was limited to reiterating accepted principles. Regarding religious issues, he did not stop repeating conventional notions of Catholicism. Likewise, other types of writing lacked acuity, such as a geography manual, limited to a descriptive plane. In any case, at the time, when a small body of intellectuals was just being formed, His verb provoked fascination by vigorously evoking saving principles. It was what he did to elliptically attack Santana's aspirations to control everything, seen as a product of the passion of selfishness:

Among the bad passions there is one, Gentlemen, of horrible forms and fatal consequences; a passion that when it develops in the heart, the havoc it causes in man is so great that, beginning by degenerating and debasing him, it ends up making him an enemy of himself, an enemy of society and an enemy of the human race. Passion of powerful incentives, because it is hidden, hypocritical and flattering, and it insinuates itself very gently, unnerving reason by degrees; passion full of artifices to fascinate by seizing those who set out their nets, and which almost always happens hidden with the veil of charity in order to more successfully defeat all the people's virtues; That passion, Gentlemen, is selfishness. It consists of a feeling of exclusive love that man has for himself, seeing in himself only the object of all good, the beginning and end of his actions, and not recognizing other rights or other obligations outside of it. Egoism is one of the most impenetrable passions, because one can be selfish in many ways and under various forms; and this vice has developed in our time in a frightful manner. A subversive philosophy, contrary to all rights, to all sound reason, tends to call into question all duties; and this is why today the virtues are unknown and despised and a right conscience is called concern and good judgment is called fanaticism.

Several elements can be derived from this complaint, which prefigures the global nature of its principles. On the one hand, it supports all consideration of the historical process in an origin derived from divine will. That is, his philosophy of history is teleological and is aimed at endorsing a modern concept of freedom. For this reason, he concludes by repudiating the conservative vision that equates the modern and revolutionary spirit with “concern and fanaticism.” He assimilates selfishness to the spheres of power “when they neglect the serious interests of the community that has placed its trust in them by only thinking about their personal usefulness; when they see the hungry crowd and thousands of citizens reduced to misery, taking little care of such misfortunes.” He concluded by contrasting the selfishness, then prevalent, with the patriotism that the Trinitarios had shown in 1844 to lay the foundations for national achievement:

Patriotism, Gentlemen, is the first of the civic virtues, it is the basis of the stability and progress of people. When this sacred fire burns in the chests of the citizens, there are no particular goals, there are no private interests, there is no exclusivism: then everything becomes generalized, everything is for everyone. From here the love to governments, respect for the laws and the peace and prosperity of the nation. Patriotism is the fraternal bond that strengthens children of the same country, giving them strength and courage to become free and sustain their freedom.

The dictator's reaction to the priest's proclamation was immediate. Santana tried to force the vicar to recant, which he categorically rejected. Santana just isolated him, protected by the security provided by his authoritarian preeminence, ratified by the annexationist order. After a year, despite the fact that Meriño remained calm, Santana, in his capacity as Spanish captain general, decided to deport him to help pave the way for a Spanish prelate. Meriño remained abroad during the following years, while the armed struggle for the reestablishment of national sovereignty was carried out. He calculated, surely based on his personal interests, that it was appropriate to abide by the Vatican's decision to support the annexationist regime.

This attitude contrasted with the courageous previous criticism, although in private, he continued to weigh Santana negatively and with considerable reservations about the annexationist regime. But the interference was evident again of personal convenience over their political orientation. When the insurrection began in Cibao, on August 16, 1863, in a letter to Carlos Nouel from Puerto Rico, Meriño condemned it. Furthermore, months later, while in Spain, he decided to accept the new order, swearing before the Spanish flag. He met with Queen Isabella II and prominent politicians of the metropolis. He even considered returning to serve the newly appointed Archbishop Bienvenido Monzón, representative of Spanish rule and a retrograde stance. He surely calculated that with such a step he would be in a position to recover hierarchical positions within the ecclesiastical apparatus. He himself admitted that in the metropolis he had dedicated himself to resolving his “business.” However, distrustful, the monarchy did not send him back to his homeland, but to Puerto Rico, giving him a canonry in the cathedral of that island. He remained in that position for two years, completely oblivious to the ongoing Dominican Restoration War.

At the beginning of 1865, when the decree of the Cortes was made public that announced the vacancy of Santo Domingo, Meriño continued acting with a sense of calculation: he left Puerto Rico and headed to Venezuela. It was a way of distancing himself from the monarchy, although at no time, as far as is recorded, did he abjure the Spanish flag. In Venezuela, he once again stood out, and even intervened in political affairs in the city of Barcelona, where he achieved an influence that denotes his sagacity. In the subsequent exile of the 1870s he would return to the same place, pleased with the affections of the Venezuelans. The priest, recently released from his position as canon of the monarchy, found the revolutionary hero Juan Pablo Duarte in Caracas, and questioned him about the events that culminated in the proclamation of 1844. In recognition for knowing Duarte, in 1884, the government asked him to deliver a grand prayer in the cathedral on the occasion of the transfer of his remains. It is one of his best speeches, full of patriotism and an ethical sense of Dominican history. However, according to the version collected by Francisco Moscoso Puello in Navarijo, he initially showed reservations about giving the requested speech, claiming that he did not know what to say about that “poor man.”

== Return to Dominican Republic ==
=== Member of the Blue Party ===
Returning to Santo Domingo shortly after the departure of the last Spanish troops, on July 11, 1865, Meriño persisted in playing a prominent role in public affairs. During the Second Republic, he was a member of the Blue Party led by Gregorio Luperón, which was liberal and progressive in its leanings. He committed himself, more clearly than before, to the liberal and national position, which had been raised by the restoration rulers from Santiago. In the midst of the fighting, the political current that later received the name of the Blue Party had emerged, to differentiate itself from the Red Party, as the group was already known that consisted followers of Buenaventura Báez since 1857. Although they adopted the principles of liberalism, the blues were also nourished by former supporters of Santana who were in no way willing to temporize with the return of Báez to the presidency. Meriño gathered both qualities and, already a leading figure in national life due to his status as former apostolic vicar, he went on to shine as one of the leading men of the Blue Party. In this context, Meriño was critical of the government of Buenaventura Báez and his attempts to lease the Bay of Samaná or annex the entire country to the United States.

Although led by three generals in dispute, the blues achieved the support of almost all the intellectuals of the time, including former Santanistas, who finally agreed that the future of the Dominican people should be associated with an order of popular sovereignty and political democracy. These intellectuals, although neutralized by the action of the leaders from the Restoration generalship – almost all of them supporters of Báez – had enough influence to sustain a prolonged struggle, which culminated in the seizure of power by the blues at the end of the 1870s. As a member of that loose constellation of soldiers, merchants, politicians and intellectuals, Meriño held the presidency of Congress Constituent body in charge of drafting a Magna Carta to replace that of 1854, which had established absolute powers for Santana.

While the debates were taking place, Pedro Guillermo, one of the restoring generals of the province of El Seibo, led a statement that brought Báez back to the presidency less than five months after the departure of the Spanish troops, despite the fact that he had received the rank of field marshal of the Spanish army. The Constituent Assembly served as the Legislative Branch, so it was up to Meriño to take the oath of office of the new president on December 8, 1865. For this reason, he gave his best-known speech, containing a surprising rebuke to the new president for having been a supporter of annexation. Now, despite being a magnificent piece, its ideas were not original, since they had been taken from a speech by a Colombian politician. This is how the president of the Assembly began:

Deep and inscrutable secrets of providence...! While you wandered along foreign beaches I missed the great events that took place in your homeland; When it seemed that you were further away from the throne and that the supreme power would be entrusted to the victorious right hand of one of the champions of independence [...] extraordinary events take place in this country...! Your star rises above the horizons of the Republic and you are calls to occupy the chair of the first magistracy. Such an unexpected event still has many who contemplate it astonished...! However, I, who must only speak to you the frank language of truth; I have been taught like you in the school of misfortune, in which the rare vicissitudes of life are studied with benefit, I will not refrain from telling you, that you should not be amazed by it; that in towns like ours, using the expression of an illustrious orator American, “it is as easy to go from exile to solitude, as from solitude to the Senate bar.”

This was a warning to the president to discard an authoritarian rule, which underlay the causes of the Dominican Republic's past misfortunes. He returned to the contrast between freedom of the country and the plague of dictatorship, although the latter presented itself as the bearer of a promise of prosperity that should be repudiated for conflicting with the principle of freedom:

Her tyrants have cruelly mistreated her, covering her with wounds and humiliating her neck, which they loaded with ignominious chains; but she has remained pure in the midst of suffering, and when patriotism took her in its arms, tearing her from the power of her oppressors, found her dejected, but beautiful and ennobled, even in misfortune as she would not have been enjoying the prosperity that prostitution offered her.

He took advantage of the occasion to present what should be the key pieces of the government program, in accordance with the principles of liberalism and economic progress. The emphasis on this last point highlights the taking of sides in favor of the application of measures for capitalist development and the hegemony of a modern bourgeoisie, as was proper from Western Europe. Of course, such a capitalist program was seen by the blues as a function of dignifying the country by guaranteeing the law, general well-being and promoting education. As was already a repeated theme, said program had to be based on morality, which in turn had to translate into the selection of “citizens of known honesty” for the stewardship of public destiny.

Governing a country, you know, citizen President, is serving his interests with rectitude and fidelity; make the law prevail equally on all citizens, never concealing the impunity of crime, nor condoning the outrage of virtue; instil a deep respect for property, strengthening love to work with all possible guarantees; promote the dissemination of the sciences so that the people become enlightened, and knowing their duties and rights, does not give room to the pernicious influences of the enemies of order and prosperity; lay internal and external peace on solid foundations to facilitate the expansion of commerce, industry and all elements of public well-being; Finally, strive to ensure that morality, which is the lifeblood of all institutions, takes deep roots in the hearts of citizens, so that progress is a truth, and peace is loved, and respect the laws and authorities, and freedom stay in order.

Báez's third government did not last long, as the leaders quickly of the Restoration concluded that their presence was incompatible with the group preeminence of the restoration leadership and the validity of the principles it represented.

Meriño went into exile once again and returned permanently in 1875.

=== Clashes with Francisco Xavier Billini ===
Meriño was not spared from the wrath of Báez, who responded to the speech cited above with deportation. But it was for a short time. Once Báez was overthrown in mid-1866, the priest immediately returned to serve the Blue Party. José María Cabral, once again president, appointed him for a mission to the Vatican, aimed at arranging a concordat and negotiating the appointment of Meriño himself as archbishop. At that time, the Dominican Catholic Church was once again going through an institutional vacuum, after the departure of Archbishop Monzón. Most of the priests, who enjoyed political influence in their localities, supported the Red Party. Cabral intended to manipulate the Church with the help of Meriño, in order to remove Baecism from its ranks.

This interest of Cabral gave rise to a dispute between the Vatican and the Dominican Republic. The President intended to assert the government's right to present to Rome the archbishop to be appointed. For this reason, he rejected the Belgian Luis Nicolás Bouggenoms as apostolic vicar and proceeded to remove him from the country. Immediately afterwards, he caused the Legislative Branch to appoint Meriño as archbishop. This designation had no effect, since the Vatican had not yet accepted the power of the Dominican Republic to propose candidates.

Meriño's mission in Rome ended in failure. According to Carlos Nouel, the cardinal circles considered that Meriño, in advocating his personal cause, lacked the virtue of humility required for the prelature. When Bouggenoms was deported by Cabral, as reported by historians Rafael Peralta Brito and José Chez Checo, he left the priest Juan de Ayala behind front of the institution as apostolic subdelegate. He fell ill and appointed Francisco Xavier Billini in his place, who was also not accepted by Cabral for being a recognized supporter of Báez and having supported the annexation to Spain until the last day.

The Vatican continued to provide support to Bouggenoms, who returned to the country shortly after the second overthrow of Cabral and Báez returned to the presidency for the fourth time, in 1868. Bouggenoms took note of the majority position of the clergy in favor of Báez, to which was added their resentment against Cabral for having expelled him from the country. As was typical, during the Six Years' government Meriño was prevented from returning to the country and left the field free to his competitors related to the Red Party. However, a part of the clergy rebelled against Bouggenoms and advocated that Billini occupy the leadership. This ignorance of Rome's decision by conservative priests culminated, in a certain way, the morass into which the ecclesiastical institution had fallen. The influence achieved by Billini among the clergy would give rise to a dispute between Meriño and Billini for the prelature. In a letter to José Gabriel García, Meriño expressed his contempt for Billini, extending it to the generality of the Dominican clergy, as part of a disbelief in the country:

I have seen everything you tell me about our clergy. What a troop of vile people! If you did not [sic] criticize me, I would question the clumsy and shameful behavior of those priests who know how to be everything except what they are. Patience! That means that the contagion has invaded everything, even the sanctuary. And we, fools! We think about saving the country!!! And you will see how the evil is not remedied by returning to harmful contemplations. Billini and Pina and Bougenon and García and all of them will join together again and, like last time, they will do whatever they want. Get rid of me, but save the church, tear it out of the hands of Luther and return to Christ!!!

For Meriño, Billini was an impostor who, under the pretext of educational work, harmed the community: “Why should Billini knowingly and consciously consent to the evil that continues to deceive so many ignorant people under the guise of School and prayers and a thousand nonsense of this kind? Is there any interest in forming a Lyceum of hypocrites?” Billini's prominence was, therefore, a reason to reinforce the skepticism into which Meriño had fallen in the face of Báez's predominance: “Here you have a powerful reason that could make me delay my return to Santo Domingo. I am not in the mood to suffer." The rivalry lasted until Meriño was appointed archbishop and unseated the competitor, which was the result of his greater intelligence, having a greater sense of politics and adapting to the dominant course of ideas of the time. Conventionally, Meriño represented the liberal positions and Billini represented the conservatives. Billini was always much more popular, first, for his relationship with Baecismo, a trend that enjoyed greater support among the people, and because he was seen as a pious individual, dedicated to the protection of the poor. In the 1880s Meriño was considered by disaffected liberals as the candidate of a negative power, so they proposed that Billini receive the papal appointment.

The animosity was mutual and was fueled by the resentment that Billini harbored when her sister María Nicolasa, also a well-known educator, was seduced by Meriño. According to a version transmitted orally, Nicolasa Billini gave birth to Meriño's daughter who died at the age of 12. There was nothing strange about this fact, because even in the ruling circles it was seen naturally that priests had undisguised marital relations. It is established that Meriño had relationships with several women. At least concubinage with Isabel Logroño, father of Álvaro Logroño, is admitted. It is also certain that he had relations with the Catalan Leonor Defilló, the mother of the doctor Fernando Alberto Defilló, whom he must have met in Venezuela. A granddaughter of Isabel Logroño commented that her descent from the archbishop was never a secret in the family, adding that he claimed that he was wearing pants under his cassock. In the correspondence and remembrance of episodes collected in Monseñor de Meriño intimate, Amelia de Marchena, under the pseudonym Francasci, casually offers evidence of her romantic relationship with the archbishop, loaded with ambiguous elements subject to interpretation, one of them the seductive capacity of the interlocutor. According to this author, the archbishop, in one of his outbursts, would have regretted having taken the habit, evoking how wonderful his life would have been if he had married Mrs. Marchena.

=== Opposition against Buenaventura Báez and the United States ===
In keeping with the distance with which he became involved in the political struggle, while the Six Years regime of Báez the priest lasted – despite recognizing the seriousness of the situation in which the Republic found itself – he limited himself to appearing briefly on the southern border to meet with his party colleagues in the armed struggle led by Cabral between 1869 and 1872. He reiterated the passivity that he had shown years before, although during the Six Years he did not stop insulting Báez. But it was a complaint full of pessimism and devoid of any militant connotation. In another letter to the historian, García extended his distrust to his own colleagues, whom he made participants in evils anchored in the collective mentality:

Today we have no reason other than to shudder with horror in view of the situation in Santo Domingo. The country annihilated; without credit, without commerce, without agriculture, without industries, without peace can be consolidated in it; without a man to whom I could attach any hope; with fatal vices rooted in the citizens of some representation; devoured by militarism that wants everything regulate with the edge of the sword; threatened by the horrors of impending anarchy; spirits deeply soured by the reactionary revenge of the triumphant parties[…]. What more does it take to despair? On what bases can we build the thought in favor of that unfortunate country?

He was acutely aware that, in the project of annexation to the United States, preliminarily signed in 1869, a question of life or death was involved for “that unfortunate country.” Compliance with the agreement would lead to the collapse of the Dominican nation, in his opinion the most dangerous situation it had ever experienced. He was desperate at the indifference with which the majority of Dominicans received Báez's annexation plan, because it would not be possible to undo it due to the strength of the power's expansionism. Since then Meriño did not relent in an anti-North American stance, surely an expression of a cultural Hispanism consubstantial with Latin American Catholicism and political nationalism. The possibility of some appeasement with the Americans, in his opinion, irreducible enemies of the dignity and existence of the Dominicans:

As Santana carried out the Spanish annexation, so can Báez carry out the Yankee annexation. The only difference will be that the first could be undone, while the second will have no remedy. The Anglo-Saxon race does not assimilate the Latin race, but devours it. We, united with the Yankees, must perish.

That nationalist position was linked to his rejection of Báez and the dispute with Billini. He considered the first as an agent of American expansionism and the second as an obstacle for the Dominican Church to achieve a national profile. When he returned to the country after the fall of the Six Years government, Meriño changed his mood and once again showed himself ready to intervene in political matters, even though he lacked influence in the ecclesiastical apparatus, which remained prostrate in dispersion. Meriño's isolation was also an expression of the weakness into which the Blue Party had fallen due to the emergence of a new political formation, the Green Party of President Ignacio María González, a breakaway from the Red Party. Meriño maintained his opposition to Báez, which he did not hide when he returned to power for the last time in 1876. Although almost all the blue intellectuals accepted the old enemy, who had promised to adhere to liberal and national principles in mea culpa for past "mistakes", Meriño maintained his hostility unchanged, as he evaluated the red leader as a monstrous entity, genetic carrier of immorality. Then the priest was in charge of the El Seibo parish, from where he supported the armed movement started by Cesáreo Guillermo that announced the decline of the last Báez administration. Meriño himself left a report about the episode, dedicated to the historian García, entitled Historical Pages, in which he was careful to present his participation with a low profile. Although the text is limited to narrating facts, it has a certain importance as a historical document, for highlighting the localist interests that animated the conflicts between leaders.

=== Dicatorship of Ulises Heureaux ===
The fall of Báez, at the beginning of 1878, marked the irreversible decline of his political current. His absence led to a vacuum of authority amid constant revolts. The leader with the greatest temporary influence in the subsequent months was Cesáreo Guillermo, who managed to attract the support of followers of former presidents Báez and González. Guillermo also set out to gain the support of the blues and presented himself as a member of that current, although Gregorio Luperón already had an indisputable ascendancy in it. At that time, a process of capital formation began around the incipient modern sugar industry. It was the manifestation of a tendency to expand ties with the international market. However, the chaos derived from the voracity of the leaders came into conflict with the requirements for peace and order that emanated from the nascent capitalist bourgeoisie. This demand favored the blues, bearers of a defined proposal for economic development and state modernization. It was not difficult, at this point, for Luperón, the leader of the blues, from his stronghold in Puerto Plata, to achieve the overthrow of Guillermo (October 1879), with minimal bloodshed. Luperón established a provisional government in Puerto Plata, and proceeded to appoint Ulises Heureaux, his military arm, as his delegate in Santo Domingo. When these events occurred, Meriño was in Puerto Plata, where he had been transferred as a parish priest, which allowed him to establish a friendship with Luperón and was fundamental for his subsequent career.

== External links and additional sources ==
- Cheney, David M. "Archdiocese of Santo Domingo". Catholic-Hierarchy.org. (for Chronology of Bishops)^{self-published}
- Chow, Gabriel. "Metropolitan Archdiocese of Santo Domingo". GCatholic.org. (for Chronology of Bishops)^{self-published}

Political offices
Preceded by Gregorio Luperón	President of the Dominican Republic; 1880–1882	Succeeded by Ulises Heureaux
Catholic Church titles
Preceded by Bienvenido Monzón y Martín	Archbishop of Santo Domingo; 1885–1906	Succeeded by Adolfo Alejandro Nouel
