= Cesareo Guillermo =

24th and 27th President of the Dominican Republic (1847–1885)

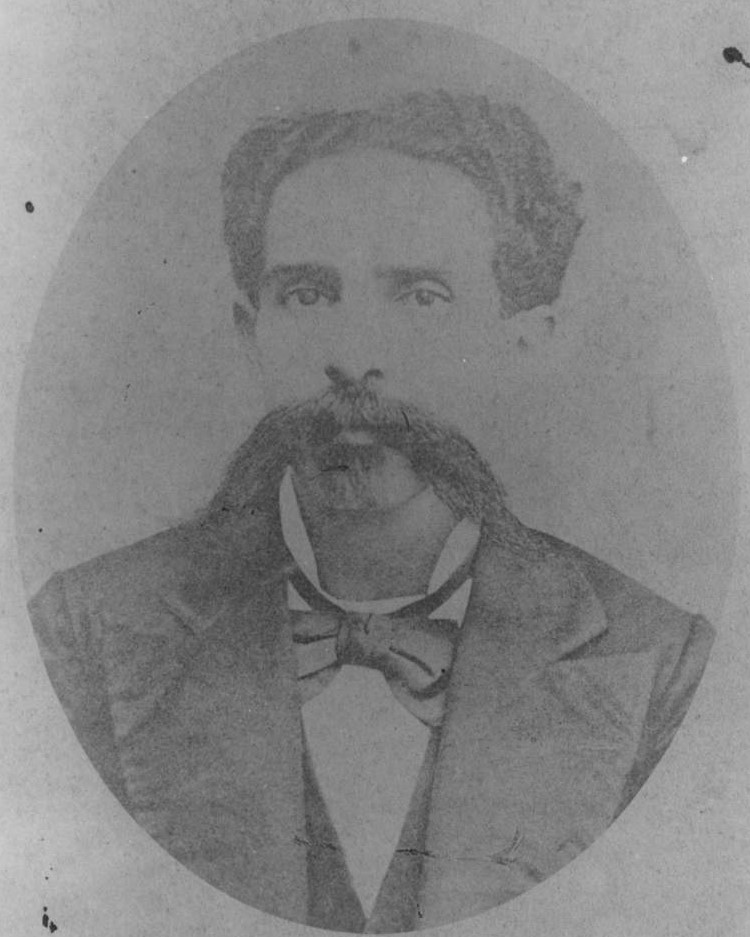
- Cesareo Guillermo between 1877 and 1878

24th President of the Dominican Republic
- In office March 5, 1878 – July 6, 1878
- Vice President: Francisco Gregorio Billini
- Preceded by: Ignacio María González
- Succeeded by: Ignacio María González

27th President of the Dominican Republic
- In office February 27, 1879 – December 6, 1879
- Preceded by: Jacinto de Castro
- Succeeded by: Gregorio Luperón

Personal details
- Born: March 8, 1847 La Rodada, Hato Mayor, Dominican Republic
- Died: November 8, 1885 (aged 38) Azua de Compostela, Azua, Dominican Republic
- Party: Red Party
- Profession: Lawyer

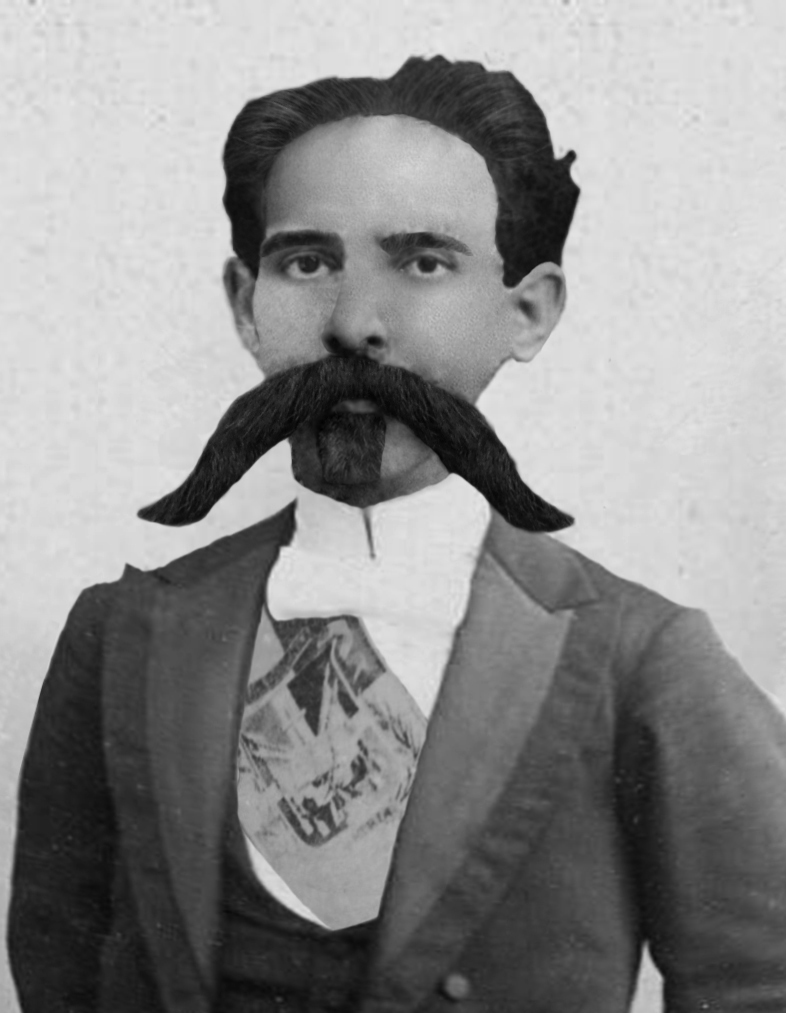
Cesareo Guillermo in 1879

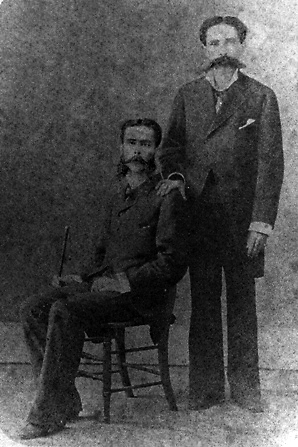
Cesareo Guillermo (left) and Juan Isidro Ortea (right) in Puerto Rico, April 1881

Cesáreo Guillermo y Bastardo (March 8, 1847 – November 8, 1885) was President of the Dominican Republic in 1878 and in 1879. His parents were Pedro Guillermo and Rosalía Bastardo. He entered the Dominican military at age 16.

== Early years ==
Son of Pedro Guillermo and Rosalía Bastardo, he was born in a place in Hato Mayor del Rey called La Rodada. Being a minor, he was tried by a martial court along with his father, accused of having rebelled in defense of the overthrown president Buenaventura Báez. The council sentenced Pedro to death, while Cesáreo was given the choice between prison and exile, the latter being the option he opted for.

When he returned from Puerto Rico - where the Spanish had confined him - he joined the Dominican army at age 16, during the Dominican Restoration War against Spain. He reappeared in public in 1865, protected by Eugenio Miches, a veteran from the Dominican War of Independence, but was at the side of Pedro Santana during the annexation to Spain.

== Military career ==
Arms commander of Higúey with the rank of colonel in the Six Years Government of Buenaventura Báez, he fought under the orders of Miches in defense of the presidency of Ulises Francisco Espaillat, rising to general. Established in El Seibo, the Pine Revolution of 1877 allowed him to fight Marcos Antonio Cabral, but he had to accept a compromise and retired to his house on the condition that Miches was named governor of the province. Once again raised, he defeated the reds in Pomarrosa.

On March 1878, Báez capitulated and Cesáreo Guillermo occupied the capital, where he presided over a provisional Government, even though Ignacio María González had gone ahead to establish another one in Santiago de Cuba.

González ended up staying with the Presidency, but as soon as he began to exercise it, Cesáreo Guillermo in the east and Ulises Heureaux in Cibao overthrew him on July 27, 1878. Two candidates, that of Cesáreo Guillermo and that of Manuel Altagracia Cáceres, who He had been vice president of the Republic during the Six Years of Báez, they disputed power, but the second was assassinated in the city of Santo Domingo and Cesáreo Guillermo was elevated to the Presidency on February 27, 1879.

For several months Cesáreo Guillermo dedicated himself to embezzling the treasury and distributing it among his supporters and friends, as well as preventing possible uprisings against him. However, eight months into his government, and after the arrival of Gregorio Luperón in the country, the blues rebelled and Cesáreo Guillermo had to face them, but Ulises Heureaux defeated him in the Widow's Chair and sought asylum in Puerto Rico.

At the end of 1881 he landed in Punta Cana, on the coast of Higüey, with a strong contingent of troops, among which were Spaniards sent by the governor of Puerto Rico. The inhabitants of the region and the men at arms welcomed him favorably and even the parish priest of Higüey, Gabriel Moreno del Christo, blessed him. Excited by his reception, he celebrated his presumed victory in advance. He distributed military ranks, sponsored weddings, and the poet Isidro Ortea, one of his supporters, composed a poem in his honor.

Ulises Heureaux selected several experienced officers and a line troop and attacked Cesáreo Guillermo on the Cabao hill, but he managed to flee and crossed the border with Haiti. In the elections held in 1884, Ulises Heureaux imposed the candidacies for the presidency and vice presidency of Francisco Gregorio Billini and Alejandro Woss y Gil against those of Segundo Imbert and Casimiro Nemesio de Moya. Faced with the growing military and political power of Ulises Heureaux, the blues dedicated themselves to attacking the Government of Billini, who defended himself by decreeing a political amnesty and calling Cesáreo Guillermo to his aid.

Faced with this fact, Luperón threatened Billini with overthrowing him, and he, impotent, resigned his position and handed it over to Woss and Gil on May 16, 1885.

One night a squad showed up at Cesáreo Guillermo's house to arrest him, but he escaped and ended up in Azua. From the area of Estebanía, near that city, he contacted Governor Juan de Vargas, who made the plaza available to him. Defeated at Boca de Vía, Guillermo went into the jungle with a group of his followers, who abandoned him.

== Death ==
He committed suicide on November 8, 1885 near the city of Azua de Compostela, while fleeing alone to evade the persecution of his political adversaries, led by the dictator Ulises Heureaux.

He was buried in the same place where his body fell.

The governor at that time, Eugenio Generoso de Marchena, ordered that the body be unearthed and buried in the Municipal Cemetery of Azua. He remained in that city until 1985 when, due to the efforts of Hatomayor residents, his remains were transferred to Hato Mayor del Rey.

Political offices
Preceded by Council of Secretaries of State	President of the Dominican Republic; 1878	Succeeded by Ignacio María González
Preceded by Council of Secretaries of State	President of the Dominican Republic; 1879	Succeeded by Gregorio Luperón
