= Ulises Heureaux =

Dictator of the Dominican Republic from 1882 to 1899

General Ulises Heureaux
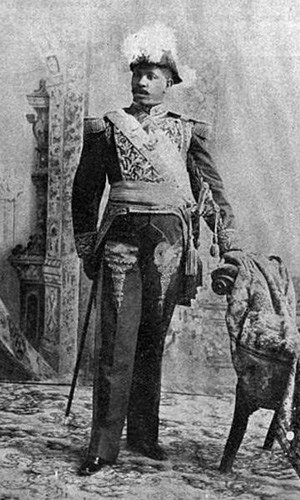
- Heureaux in the presidential office in 1893

30th President of the Dominican Republic
- In office September 1, 1882 – September 1, 1884
- Vice President: Casimiro Nemesio de Moya
- Preceded by: Fernando Arturo de Meriño
- Succeeded by: Francisco Gregorio Billini

32th President of the Dominican Republic
- In office January 6, 1887 – February 27, 1889
- Vice President: Segundo Imbert; Manuel María Gautier
- Preceded by: Alejandro Woss y Gil
- Succeeded by: Manuel María Gautier

33rd President of the Dominican Republic
- In office April 30, 1889 – July 26, 1899
- Vice President: Manuel María Gautier; Wenceslao Figuereo
- Preceded by: Manuel María Gautier
- Succeeded by: Wenceslao Figuereo

Personal details
- Born: October 21, 1845 San Felipe de Puerto Plata, Dominican Republic
- Died: July 26, 1899 (aged 53) Moca, Dominican Republic
- Party: Blue Party
- Spouse: Catalina Flan
- Relations: Charlie Mariotti (2nd-greatgrandson) Skade Delicati (3rd-greatgrandson)

Ulises Hilarión Heureaux Leibert (Spanish: [uˈlises eˈɾo]; October 21, 1845 – July 26, 1899) nicknamed Lilís, was president of the Dominican Republic from September 1, 1882 to September 1, 1884, from January 6, 1887 to February 27, 1889 and again from April 30, 1889 maintaining power between his terms.

Heureaux ruled the Dominican Republic as a dictator. During his rule, the Dominican Republic shifted its orientation from Europe and exports of tobacco and fine woods to orienting itself toward the United States and exporting sugar. He undertook some efforts to professionalize the civil service and modernize the military. He enriched himself during his rule, with blurry lines between his personal finances and those of the DR government. He was assassinated by Ramón Cáceres in 1899.

== Early life ==
Heureaux, known by the nickname of Lilís, was born in Puerto Plata. His father was José D'Assás Heureaux Fortune, who was born in Cap-Haïtien, Haiti, the son of Pierre Alexandre Heureaux, Judge of the Civil Court in Cap-Haïtien, and one of his household staff. (Note: D'assas Heureaux's father, Pierre Alejandro (Pierre-Alexandre) Heureaux, was a Frenchman and his mother, Roselia Jean-Louis, an African-born slave) Ulises's mother Josefa Leibert was born on the island of Saint Thomas. His father was Haitian mulatto and his mother was African. Due to his cultural background, he was able to speak French and English in addition to Spanish fluently.

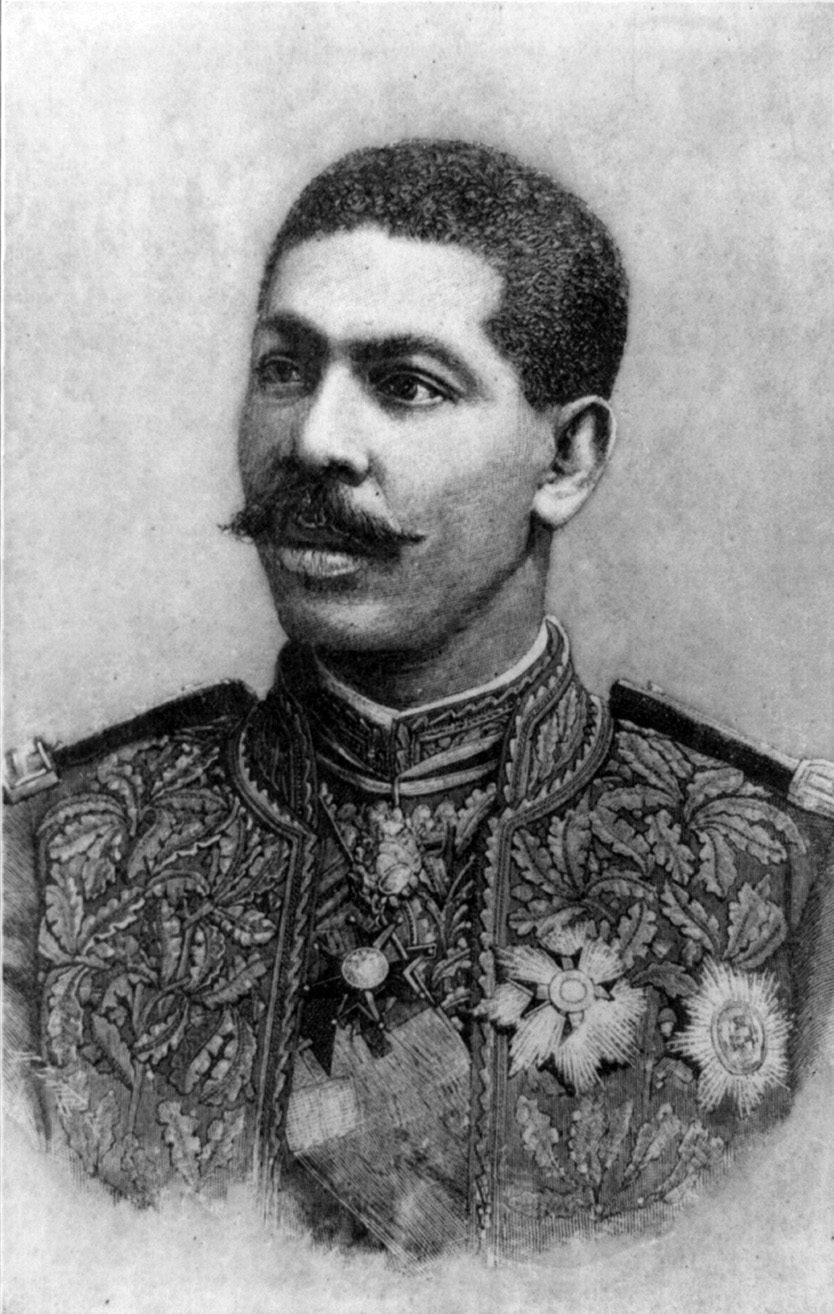
Ulises Hereaux

Following the annexation of the Dominican Republic by Spain in 1861 he joined the rebellion to restore independence, becoming the principal lieutenant of Gen. Gregorio Luperón. In the period following this restoration of independence, when revolutions were an annual occurrence, Heureaux emerged as one of the principal leaders of the Partido Azul. In 1876, he orchestrated an uprising that seized Puerto Plata and led to the election of Ulises Espaillat. When the nation's leading caudillo Buenaventura Báez, returned to power for his fifth term and fell after less than a year, he helped overthrow the two subsequent regimes.

== Rise to power ==
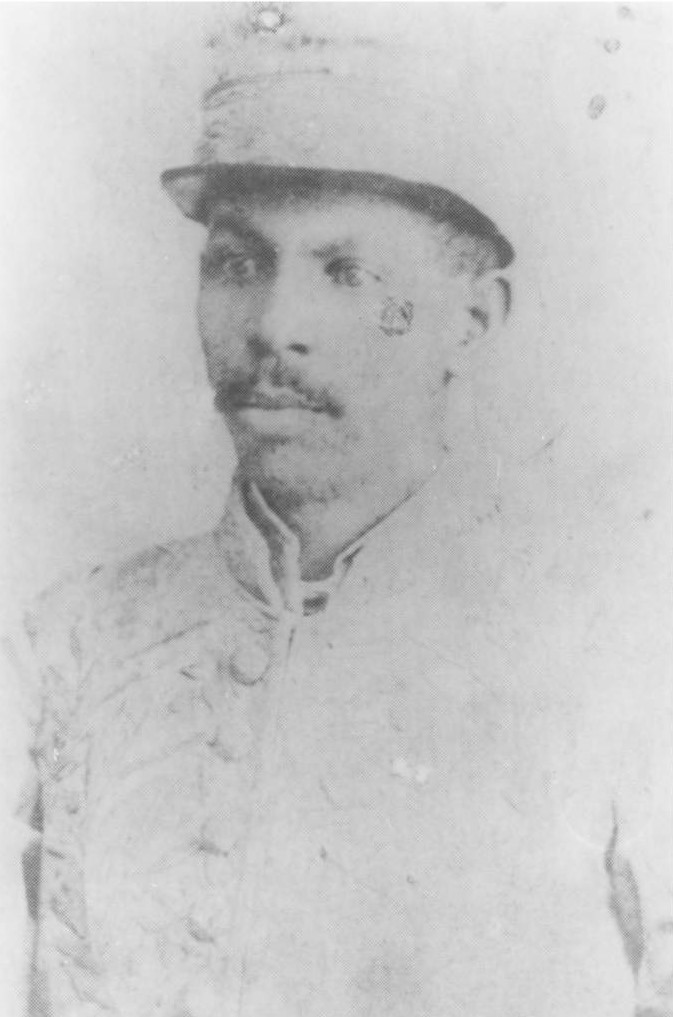
Heureaux in 1880

When Luperón became President in 1879, he chose to remain in his hometown of Puerto Plata where he had established himself as a prosperous tobacco merchant, delegating authority in Santo Domingo to Heureaux.

A Catholic priest named Fernando Meriño became President in September 1880, Heureaux served as his Interior Minister and his behind-the-scenes influence on the rest of the cabinet apparently exceeded that of the president. Although Meriño briefly suspended constitutional procedures in response to unrest fomented by some remaining supporters of Buenaventura Báez, he abided by the two-year term established under Luperón, handing the reins of government over to Heureaux on September 1, 1882. The administrations of Luperón and Meriño succeeded in bringing relative economic stability to the republic, and in Heureaux's first two-year term he faced only one major uprising. By 1884, however, no single potential successor, among the various local caciques who constituted the republic's ruling group, enjoyed widespread support. Luperón, still the leader of the ruling Azul Party, backed General Segundo Imbert, while Heureaux supported the candidacy of General Francisco Gregorio Billini. Heureaux assured Luperón that he would support Imbert should he win the election, but he had ballot boxes in critical precincts stuffed in order to assure Billini's election.

After being inaugurated on September 1, 1884, Billini resisted Heureaux's efforts to manipulate him and Heureaux responded by spreading rumors to the effect that Billini had decreed a political amnesty so that he could conspire with ex-president Cesáreo Guillermo against Luperón's leadership of the Azules. This precipitated a governmental crisis that forced in Billini's resignation on May 16, 1885. He was succeeded by Vice President Alejandro Woss y Gil, and Heureaux assumed an expanded role under the new government, with a number of his adherents included in the cabinet and the general himself assuming command of the national army to stem a rebellion led by Guillermo, who committed suicide when faced with capture. This further endeared Heureaux to Luperón, a longtime enemy of Guillermo. Luperón accordingly supported Heureaux in the 1886 presidential elections. The blatancy of the electoral fraud committed by Heureaux led the supporters of his opponent, Casimiro de Moya, to attempt an armed rebellion in the Cibao Valley. Benefiting from Luperón's support in this struggle, he brutally suppressed this uprising, putting an end to the cycle of civil strife that had plagued the republic. Having again achieved power, Heureaux maintained his grip on it for the rest of his life. In 1888, he exiled Gregorio Luperón, and the following year forced Congress to pass constitutional amendments abolishing the barrier against Presidential re-election and eliminating direct elections. To expand his power base, he incorporated members of both of the rival political factions, the Rojos and Azules, into his government. He also developed an extensive network of secret police and informants to avert rebellions, assassinating or forcing into exile the politicians who he could not co-opt. Heureaux enriched himself and his followers through extensive private investments in the emerging export economy, in which "the separation between the president's private means and state finances was vague, fluid and almost non-existent." He had his own secret telegraph code, publicly documented comparatively recently, that he used to control his troops and police.

During the last two decades of the 19th century, sugar surpassed tobacco as the country's main export, as a result of an influx of Cuban sugar planters following the Ten Years' War. Lilís granted them large tracts of land in the southeastern coastal plain, where they built the nation's first mechanized sugar mills. His dictatorship undertook many ambitious projects to modernize the country, including the electrification of Santo Domingo, the construction of a bridge over the Ozama River, and the initiation of inland rail service on a single-track line linking Santiago to Puerto Plata.

== Political demise and assassination ==
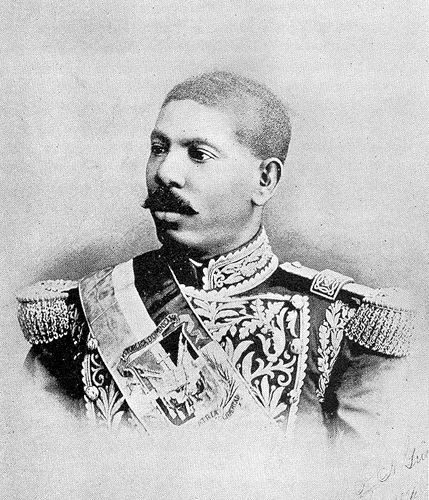

In order to enrich himself and his supporters, strengthen the bribe system, pay for the army, help set up sugar mills and finance infrastructural development, Lilís borrowed heavily from European and American banks, even as sugar prices underwent a steep decline. In 1888, he took out a loan of three-quarters of a million pounds sterling from the Amsterdam banking house Westendorp. The Westendorp Company went bankrupt in 1892, after its agent revealed fraud in the Customs Service, where Heureaux arranged preferential tariff treatment for some of his domestic creditors. A consortium of New York businessmen calling themselves the San Domingo Improvement Co. bought out Westendorp, taking over the claims of its European bondholders, in exchange for two loans, one of $1.2 million and the other of £2 million, to fund the countries external debt, to be secured with a lien over the nations customs fees. As the mounting public debt made it impossible to maintain his political machine, Heureaux increasingly relied on secret loans from the San Domingo Improvement Co., sugar planters and local merchants.

In 1897, with the country on the brink of bankruptcy, Lilís was reduced to printing five million dollars' worth of unsecured paper money, known as papaletas de Lilís, ruining many of the country's merchants. This helped trigger a new revolt among the Cibaeño tobacco planters and merchants, leading to his assassination in Moca on 26 July 1899. By the time of his death, the national debt exceeded $35 million, fifteen times the annual budget.

During his time in office, the country's economy came largely under the control of the United States. Upon his death, it was revealed that he had taken many secret loans from foreign banks for personal enrichment. The government declared bankruptcy, the economy crumbled and the American military intervened.

== See also ==
- Afro-Dominicans
- Cocolo

== Bibliography ==
- Martínez-Vergne, Teresita Nation and Citizenship in the Dominican Republic (University of North Carolina Press: Chapel Hill, N.C., 2005)
- Moya-Pons, Frank Dominican Republic: A National History (Hispaniola Books: New Rochelle, NY, 1995)
- Rodman, Selden Quisqueya: A History of the Dominican Republic (University of Washington Press: Seattle, 1964)

== Notes ==
Political offices
Preceded by Fernando Arturo de Meriño	President of the Dominican Republic; September 1, 1882 – September 1, 1884	Succeeded by Francisco Gregorio Billini
Preceded by Alejandro Woss y Gil	President of the Dominican Republic; January 6, 1887 – February 27, 1889	Succeeded by Manuel María Gautier (Acting)
Preceded by Manuel María Gautier (Acting)	President of the Dominican Republic; April 30, 1889 – July 26, 1899	Succeeded by Wenceslao Figuereo
