= Blue Party (Dominican Republic) =

Blue Party Partido Azul
- Historic leaders: Gregorio Luperón (first); Juan Isidro Jimenes Pereyra (last)
- Founded: 1865
- Dissolved: 1930
- Ideology: Liberalism
- Colors: Blue

Election symbol

The Blue Party (Spanish: Partido Azul), also known as the National Party, Liberal Party, or National Liberal Party and nicknamed together The Tailless (Spanish: Los Bolos), was a historical Dominican political party from the late 19th century to the mid 20th century. Ulises Heureaux and Juan Isidro Jimenes Pereyra were the main leaders of this party in the 20th century, and were opposed to Los Coludos (Spanish for 'The Long-tailed Ones') or Red Party, led by Horacio Vásquez.

The name of the party came from the popularity of rooster fighting in the late 19th and early 20th century, and Bolos literally means Tailless. The Blue Party was banned in 1930 after Rafael Trujillo’s coup. Founded by intellectuals, Santo Domingo liberals, merchants and large peasant proprietors, it does not technically have an ideological heir, although the Liberal Party of the Dominican Republic tends to identify with a similar type of liberalism.

== See also ==
- Category:Blue Party (Dominican Republic) politicians
- History of the Dominican Republic
