= President of the Dominican Republic =

Head of state and government

Constitutional President of the Dominican Republic
- Presidente Constitutional de la República Dominicana
- Coat of arms of the Dominican Republic Current logo of the presidency of the Dominican Republic

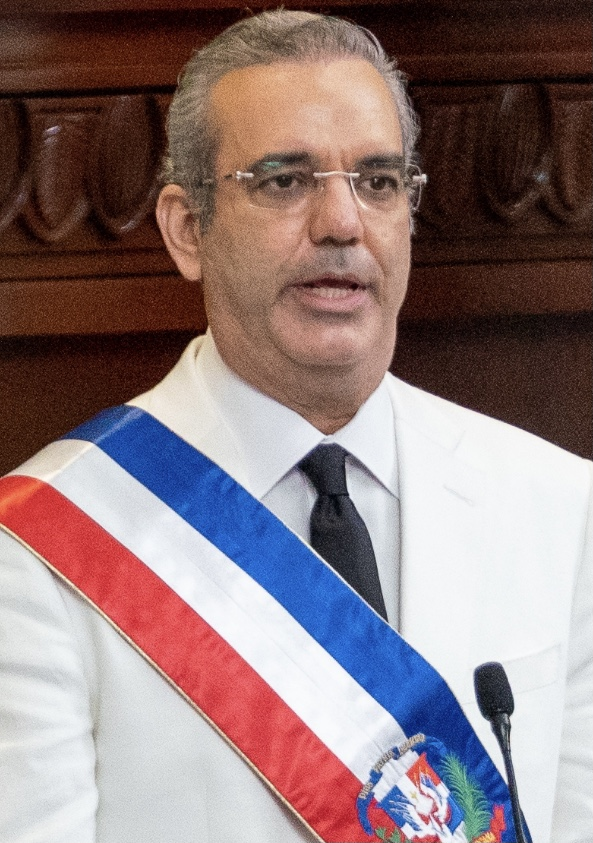
- Incumbent; Luis Abinader since 16 August 2020
- Executive branch of the Government of the Dominican Republic
- Style: His/Her Excellency Mr./Madam Constitutional President of the Republic (Excelentísimo/a Señor/a Presidente/a Constitucional de la República) (official); Mr./Madam President (Note: for the position of president.) (Señor/a Presidente/a) (informal); The Most Excellent (Excelentísimo/a Señor/a) (diplomatic); His/Her Excellency (Su Excelencia) (diplomatic)
- Type: Head of state Head of government Commander-in-chief
- Member of: Cabinet of the Dominican Republic; National Council of the Magistracy
- Residence: National Palace (government office); Casa Presidencial (official residence in Santiago de los Caballeros)
- Seat: Santo Domingo
- Appointer: Central Electoral Board via Universal suffrage elections (Note: along with the vice-president as a running mate.)
- Term length: Four years; limited to two terms in total
- Constituting instrument: Constitution of the Dominican Republic
- Inaugural holder: Pedro Santana
- Formation: 14 November 1844 (182 years ago)
- Succession: Line of succession
- Unofficial names: PresidenciaRD, Dominican president, Chief executive, Head of the executive branch
- Deputy: Vice President
- Salary: RD$450,000 (monthly)
- Website: presidencia.gob.do (in Spanish)

The president of the Dominican Republic (Spanish: presidente/a de la República Dominicana), officially the constitutional president of the Dominican Republic (Spanish: presidente/a constitucional de la República Dominicana), is both the head of state and head of government of the Dominican Republic. The presidential system was established in 1844, following the proclamation of the republic during the Dominican War of Independence. His official residence is the National Palace.

The article CXXVIII of the constitution instructs the president of the "faithful execution of the Dominican Law" and confers on him the rank of commander-in-chief of the Armed Forces, the National Police and all the state security forces. It has the power to appoint ministers, grant pardons, moratoria and the duty of ensuring national security and the collection and faithful investment of national income. The constitution also places it as the head of the state's foreign policy and grants it the power to appoint diplomatic representatives on the recommendation and approval of the Senate of the Dominican Republic. The constitution of the Dominican Republic was published in 1801

The president is elected by universal suffrage for a term of four years. Under the Constitution of the Dominican Republic, as amended in 2015 and again in October 2024, no person can be elected president more than twice, and the two-term limit is now among the constitution's unamendable provisions. In case of death, dismissal, or resignation of a president, the vice president of the Dominican Republic assumes the presidency. In the absence of both, the executive branch may organize an interim government or pass control of the government to the legislative branch.

There have been 54 people who have taken office. The first president was Pedro Santana, who was invested on 14 November 1844 by decision of the Central Government Junta. The current president of the Dominican Republic is Luis Abinader of the Modern Revolutionary Party, who won the 2020 Dominican Republic general election and took office on 16 August 2020 from Danilo Medina. He was re-elected for a second term in the 2024 Dominican Republic general election and is constitutionally barred from seeking a third term; the next election is scheduled for 2028.

Beginning in the first decade of the 21st century, the Dominican presidency has taken on a more participatory role at the global level, strengthening diplomatic ties throughout the world and serving as a mediator in conflicts as close as the 2009 Honduran coup d'état and so far away as the Arab–Israeli conflict.

== Origins ==
The origin of the presidency of the Dominican Republic goes back to the War of Independence, when the Central Government Junta (JCG) constituted the first form of government that the country had in independent and republican living conditions.

The main activities, at such a convulsive moment, were to lead the war against the invasion of the Haitians, since it depended on the survival of the newly born state and the application of emergency measures of a provisional nature in order to put the governmental machinery, the collection of taxes, inform foreign powers of the existence of the new state and extend its dominion over the newly liberated territory. At the beginning J.C.G. He had to keep Haitian laws in force for a while, since otherwise the courts, the collection of taxes, municipalities, customs and other indispensable organisms for the normal course of the institutional life of every society would not have worked. The J.C.G. He ruled the country for an eight-month period.

In July 1844, General Pedro Santana, after a streak of successive victories in the southern part of the country, appeared with his army in Santo Domingo and was proclaimed President of the Junta Central Government. The following month, Santana sent the nation's Founding Fathers into exile. On 14 November of that same year he took office as the first constitutional president of the Dominican Republic.

== Constitutional role ==
Presidential Standard (at sea)

The Constitution of the Dominican Republic, which was most recently amended in October 2024, establishes the requirements, rights and obligations of the president of the republic.

The office can be held for up to two four-year terms. People who have completed two presidential terms cannot run for president again. The change of command takes place every four years, on 16 August, which is the day of the Restoration of the Republic, a national holiday.

Prior to 2015, the president was limited to one consecutive term, but could run for the office again after at least one subsequent term. The 2015 amendment allowed one immediate re-election. On 27 October 2024, President Luis Abinader promulgated further amendments approved by the National Assembly. These made the two-term limit an unamendable provision, barred elected officials from benefiting from constitutional changes made during their term, reduced the Chamber of Deputies from 190 to 170 seats, and provided for presidential, legislative and municipal elections to be held on the same day. Civil society groups criticised the lack of public consultation on the amendments.

== Schools and powers of the president of the Dominican Republic ==
The schools and powers of the president of the Dominican Republic are contained in the title fourth, chapter I, section II of Constitution of the Dominican Republic giving the following rights and obligations: 'in its status as head of state corresponding:'

- Chair acts solemn of the nation.
- Enact and make post laws and resolutions National Congress and take care of his faithful execution. issue decrees, regulations and instructions when necessary.
- Name or dismiss members jurisdictions military and police.
- Celebrate and sign treated or international conventions and submission to the approval of the National Congress, without which will not validity or require the Republic.
- Have, under the Act as concerns to the armed forces and on the National police send them by itself, or through the Ministry for maintaining always your Supreme command. fix the contingent of the same and have them the end of the public service.
- Take the necessary steps to provide and ensure self-defense of the nation, if armed attack current or imminent on the part of foreign nation or powers external must inform the National Congress on arrangements and request declaration of state of defense if it may from.
- Declare, if not finds it met the National Congress, the States of exception in accordance with the provisions articles 262 to 266 of the Constitution.
- Adopt interim measures police and safety necessary if violation of the provisions of article 62, section 6 of the Constitution, that disrupt or threaten law and order, state security, operation regular public services or public purpose, or prevent the development of economic activities and not constitute the facts under article 262 to 266 of the Constitution.
- Have, in accordance with the law, everything on areas overhead, maritime River, land, military and police safety National, with the previous studies conducted by the ministries and dependencies administrative.
- Grant pardons day 27 February, 16 Aug and 23 December every year, in accordance with the law and international conventions.
- Make arrest or expel, under the law, the foreign whose activities fueren or pudieren be harmful public policy or National security.
- Prohibit when convenience to the public interest, the entrance of foreign the country. 'in its status as head of government has the power to:'
- Name ministers and deputy ministers and other public officials that Occupy charges free appointment or whose designation not be attributed to any other body of the state recognized for this Constitution or by the laws and acceptarles their disclaimers and removerlos.
- Designate and holders organs and autonomous bodies and decentralized of the state and acceptarles their disclaimers and removerlos, in accordance with the law, C.) change the place of residence official when it deems necessary.
- Celebrate contracts, subjecting the adoption of the National Congress when contain provisions involvement's rental National, to the sale of assets of the state, the lifting borrowing or when estipulen tax exemptions in general, according to the Constitution. the amount up for such contracts and exemptions can be signed by the President of the Republic without approval congresual, it will be of two hundred minimum wages public sector. * Ensure good collection and faithful investment's rental National.
- Deposit to the National Congress, to start the first Legislature ordinary on 27 February every year, memories ministries and accountable of administration of the previous year.
- Subject to the National Congress, no later than the first October every year, the bill of budget general of the state for the following year.
- As head of state and government corresponding.
- Designate, with the approval from the Senate of the Republic, ambassadors accredited on the outside and the heads of permanent missions to international organizations, and to name the other members of the diplomatic Corps, in accordance with the law of foreign service, acceptarles their disclaimers and removerlos.
- Direct negotiations diplomatic and receive the heads of state foreign and their representatives.
- Grant or not authorized to Dominican citizens so they can exercise charges or public functions of a government or international organizations in territory Dominican, and so they can accept and use decorations and titles granted by foreign governments.
- authorize or not to municipalities to sell real approve or not contracts make when constitute warranty properties or income municipal.
- Other powers under the Constitution and laws.

== Requirements ==
According to the Constitution of the Dominican Republic of 1966, in its modification of the year 2015 by the Congress, the President:

- Must be Dominican by birth or origin.
- Have the age of 30 years old or more.
- Be in full exercise of their civil and political rights.
- Not be active in military and police service for at least three years before the election.

== Constitutions through Trujillo ==
The first Dominican constitution was promulgated on 6 November 1844, immediately after the nation achieved independence from Haiti. It was a liberal document with many familiar elements—separation of powers, checks and balances, and a long list of basic rights. However, an authoritarian government replaced the country's liberal, democratic government during its first year. The new regime proceeded to write its own constitution. This second constitution considerably strengthened the executive, weakened the legislative and the judicial branches, and gave the president widespread emergency powers, including the power to suspend basic rights and to rule by decree. Thereafter, governance of the country often alternated between liberal and authoritarian constitutional systems.

Even the dictator Rafael Trujillo always took care to operate under the banner of constitutionalism. Under Trujillo, however, the legislature was simply a rubber stamp; the courts were not independent; and basic rights all but ceased to exist. He governed as a tyrant, unfettered by constitutional restrictions.

== Constitutions after Trujillo ==
After Trujillo's death in 1961, the constitution was amended to provide for new elections and to allow the transfer of power to an interim Council of State. Although promulgated as a new document, the 1962 constitution was actually a continuation of the Trujillo constitution, and it was thus unpopular.

In 1964, Juan Bosch's freely elected, social-democratic government drafted a new and far more liberal constitution. It separated church and state, put severe limits on the political activities of the armed forces, established a wide range of civil liberties, and restricted the rights of property relative to individual rights. These provisions frightened the more conservative elements in Dominican society, which banded together to oust Bosch and his constitution in September 1963. Subsequently, the more conservative 1962 constitution was restored. In the name of constitutionalism, Bosch and his followers launched a revolution in 1965, the objective of which was restoration of the liberal 1963 constitution.

Largely as a result of the United States military intervention of April 1965, the civil war had died down by 1966. With Joaquín Balaguer and his party in control, the Dominicans wrote still another constitution. This one was intended to avert the conflicts and polarization of the past by combining features from both the liberal and the conservative traditions. The 1966 Constitution incorporated a long list of basic rights, and it provided for a strengthened legislature; however, it also gave extensive powers to the executive, including emergency powers. In this way, the country sought to bridge the gap between its democratic and its authoritarian constitutions, by compromising their differences.

Later constitutions were enacted in 1994, 2002 and 2010, followed by amendments in 2015 and 2024.

== Evolution of the presidency logo ==
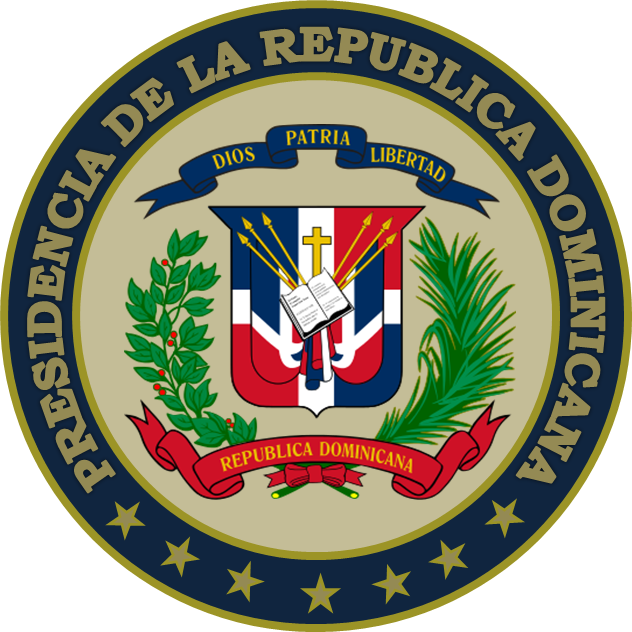
2012–2020 (official seal under the presidency of Danilo Medina)

2020–present (under the presidency of Luis Abinader)

== Latest election ==
=== Next election ===
The next presidential election is due in 2028, when Abinader cannot run again. His party, the Modern Revolutionary Party, will have to choose a successor.

Candidate	Running mate	Party	Votes	%
Luis Abinader	Raquel Peña	Modern Revolutionary Party	2,507,297	57.44
Leonel Fernández	Ingrid Mendoza	People's Force	1,259,427	28.85
Abel Martínez	Zoraima Cuello	Dominican Liberation Party	453,468	10.39
Roque Espaillat	José Ernesto Fadul	Democratic Hope Party	59,396	1.36
Carlos Peña	Nikauly de la Mota	Generation of Servants Party	31,566	0.72
Virginia Antares Rodríguez	Ico Abreu	Democratic Choice	25,204	0.58
Miguel Vargas	Joel Díaz Ureña	Dominican Revolutionary Party	19,790	0.45
María Teresa Cabrera	Jesús Díaz Morán	Broad Front	6,255	0.14
Fulgencio Severino	Francisca Peguero	Country for All Movement	2,744	0.06
Total			4,365,147	100.00
Valid votes			4,365,147	98.56
Invalid/blank votes			63,932	1.44
Total votes			4,429,079	100.00
Registered voters/turnout			8,145,548	54.37
Source: JCE

== See also ==
- List of presidents of the Dominican Republic
- Vice President of the Dominican Republic
- Politics of the Dominican Republic
