= Cibao State =

Gobierno Provisional del Cibao Estado del Cibao
- 1857–1858
- Flag
- Motto: Dios, Patria y Libertad "God, Fatherland, and Liberty"
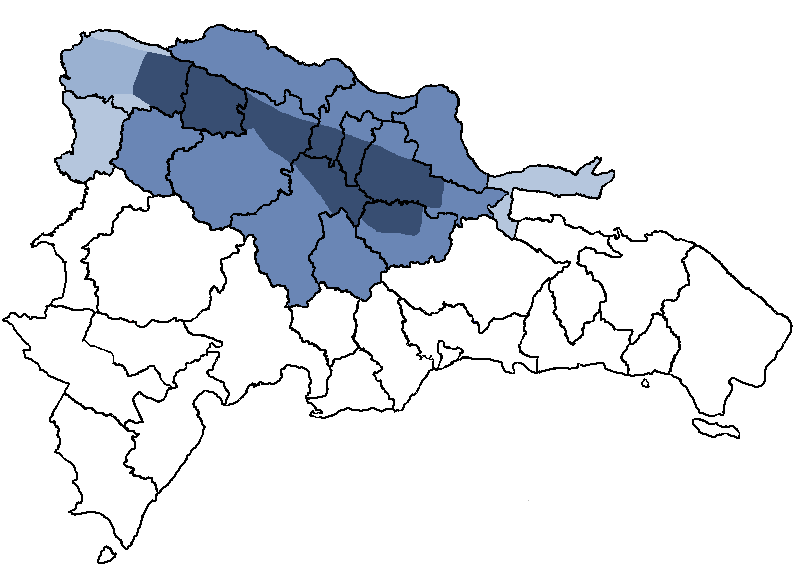
- Status: Unrecognized de facto state
- Capital: Santiago de los Caballeros
- Common languages: Spanish
- Religion: Roman Catholic~95%
- Government: Constitutional republic
- President
  - 1858: José Desiderio Valverde
- Legislature: Congress
  - Upper house: Senate
- History
  - Cibaenian Revolution: 7 July 1857
  - End of de facto independence: July 1858

Population
  - 1858: 180,000
- Currency: Dominican Real (also Spanish, French, and U.S. coins in circulation)
- Today part of: Cibao Region

The Provisional Government of Cibao was a de facto independent state established in the Cibao region of the Dominican Republic during the Revolution of 1857. From 1857 to 1858 it operated separately from the government in Santo Domingo under President Buenaventura Báez, with its own authorities, institutions, and constitution. The movement culminated in the proclamation of the Constitution of Moca (1858), which gave the Cibao government the character of a rival national state and marked one of the most important episodes of Cibaenian separatism and regional autonomy.
