= Benigno Filomeno de Rojas =

11th President of Dominican Republic (1865–1865)

Benigno Filomeno de Rojas Ramos
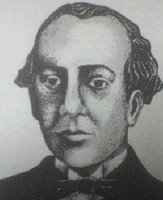

11th President of the Dominican Republic
- In office 24 January 1865 – 24 March 1865
- Vice President: Gregorio Luperón
- Preceded by: Gaspar Polanco
- Succeeded by: Pedro Antonio Pimentel

Vice President of the Dominican Republic
- In office 24 March 1865 – 4 August 1865
- President: Pedro Antonio Pimentel
- Preceded by: Gregorio Luperón
- Succeeded by: Francisco Antonio Gómez y Báez

Vice President of the Dominican Republic
- In office 1858–1861
- President: Pedro Santana
- Preceded by: Domingo Daniel Pichardo Pró
- Succeeded by: Vacant, Annexation by Spain

Personal details
- Born: February 11, 1821 Santiago de los Caballeros Dominican Republic
- Died: October 30, 1865 (aged 44) Santo Domingo Dominican Republic

Benigno Filomeno de Rojas Ramos (February 11, 1821 – October 30, 1865) was a Dominican lawyer, economist, and politician who served as the 11th President of the Dominican Republic.

He was the president of the Senate of the Dominican Republic in 1854.

== Early years ==
He was born in the city of Santiago on February 13, 1811. His parents were Carlos de Rojas Valerio and María Antonia Ramos Nazario. His family left the country following the Haitian invasion of 1822. As a teenager he moved to England, where he was educated and adopted English and American constitutionalist doctrines, in addition to acquiring administrative experience as a British government official. Upon returning to the country in 1846, he stood out as one of the most enlightened Cibaeño intellectuals and focused his attention on the technical and administrative reform of the State.

== Vice Presidency ==
He returned to the Dominican Republic when Independence had already been proclaimed in 1844. He was one of the main drafters of the manifesto of the Cibaeño Revolution waged by the liberals of Cibao against Buenaventura Báez, whose victory determined the transfer of the capital of the Republic from Santo Domingo to Santiago. He held positions in the Senate. In 1858, he presided over the Constituent Congress that met in the city of Moca and elected José Desiderio Valverde. In this government he held the position of Vice President. In addition to his political life, he was a lawyer, a profession that he practiced successfully. In 1861, he objected to the reimposition of Spanish rule. He would go on to be one of the first to support the Dominican Restoration War, becoming one of its leaders. He was chief of operations for President Gaspar Polanco.

== Presidency ==
It was a short-lived government. He had the initiative to create schools in each town and in the provincial capitals. He contributed to promoting education, while he held important positions, he founded primary and secondary schools. He had other projects to improve communication routes, but he could not carry them out. He ruled from January 24, 1865 to March 24, 1865.

== Death ==
After being removed from office by President José Antonio Salcedo and he retired to live in Moca. He held the vice presidency of the Republic three times. He died in Santo Domingo, on October 30, 1865.

== See also ==
- List of presidents of the Dominican Republic
- Cibaeño Revolution
- Dominican Restoration War
- Gaspar Polanco

Political offices
Preceded by Domingo Daniel Pichardo Pró	Vice President of the Dominican Republic; 1858-1861	Succeeded by Annexed by Spain
Preceded by Gaspar Polanco	President of the Dominican Republic; 1865	Succeeded by Pedro Antonio Pimentel
Preceded by Gregorio Luperón	Vice President of the Dominican Republic; 1865	Succeeded by Francisco Antonio Gómez y Báez
