= Buenaventura Báez =

3rd, 6th, 15th, 17th and 22th President of the Dominican Republic (1812–1884)

Mr. President Buenaventura Báez
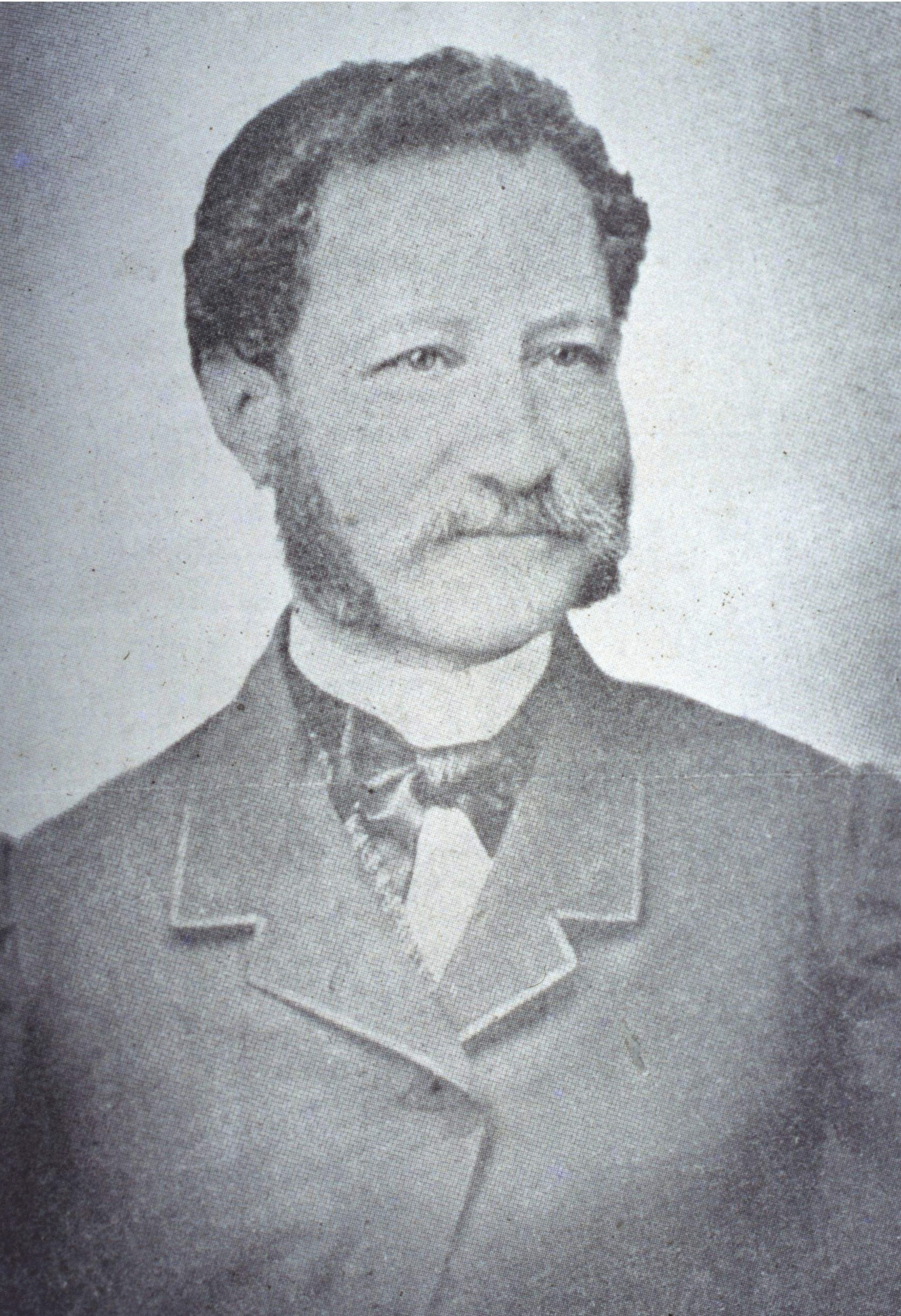

President of the Dominican Republic
- In office May 29, 1849 – February 15, 1853
- Preceded by: Manuel Jimenes
- Succeeded by: Pedro Santana
- In office October 8, 1856 – June 13, 1858
- Vice President: Domingo Daniel Pichardo Pró
- Preceded by: Manuel de Regla Mota
- Succeeded by: José Desiderio Valverde
- In office December 8, 1865 – May 29, 1866
- Vice President: Francisco Antonio Gómez
- Preceded by: Pedro Guillermo
- Succeeded by: José María Cabral
- In office May 2, 1868 – January 2, 1874
- Vice President: Manuel Altagracia Cáceres (1868–1871); Juan Isidro Ortea y Kennedy (1871–1874)
- Preceded by: Manuel Altagracia Cáceres
- Succeeded by: Ignacio María González
- In office December 26, 1876 – March 2, 1878
- Vice President: Vacant
- Preceded by: Marcos Antonio Cabral
- Succeeded by: Ignacio María González

4th Vice President of the Dominican Republic
- In office October 6, 1856 – October 8, 1856
- Preceded by: Antonio Abad Alfau
- Succeeded by: Domingo Daniel Pichardo Pró

Personal details
- Born: Ramón Buenaventura Báez Méndez; July 14, 1812 Barahona, Captaincy General of Santo Domingo
- Died: March 14, 1884 (aged 71) Hormigueros, Puerto Rico
- Party: Red Party
- Relations: Marcos Antonio Cabral (son-in-law); Virgins of Galindo (nieces-in-law); Antonio Sánchez-Valverde (grandfather); Ana Valverde (second cousin-once removed); José Desiderio Valverde (third cousin)
- Children: 9 (possibly more)
- Parents: Pablo Altagracia Báez (father); Teresa de Jesús Méndez (mother)

Ramón Buenaventura Báez Méndez (July 14, 1812 – March 14, 1884) was a Dominican conservative politician and military figure. Known for having served as president of the Dominican Republic on five occasions, his rule was characterized by corruption and governing for the benefit of his personal fortune.

Born in the community of Rincón, today Cabral, into a wealthy family, at a very early age he was sent to France to be educated. Precisely because of his education, much higher than average, Buenaventura Báez was able to carve out a leadership from a young age that allowed him to be appointed as a deputy in the Haitian Congress, a position he held in 1843, when the Reform Revolution took place. From this position he began his work aimed at obtaining a protectorate from some foreign power, whether it was France, the United States, or any other.

Having achieved independence from Haiti in 1844, he was president of the brand new Dominican Republic on five occasions, a position in which he had some achievements, such as the founding of the first secondary school in the country, Colegio San Buenaventura; But, in general terms, Báez ruled dictatorially, orchestrating murders, engaging in political schemes, and alternating his first three terms. In 1861, he opposed annexation to Spain because the person promoting it was his longtime political enemy, Pedro Santana; However, after a few months, Báez managed and obtained the rank of marshal of the Spanish Army, with the intention of achieving the governorship of the overseas province that the country had become, which he did not achieve. Shortly after the Dominican Restoration War, the Dominican Republic regained its independence.

Since his return to power in the late 1860s, he attempted to negotiate another annexationist deal with the United States, under Ulysses S. Grant. However, the country was not annexed to the United States due to the opposition of Gregorio Luperón, who fought it on all fronts, supported by José María Cabral, and because the United States Congress rejected the offer, despite the fact that Báez had the measure approved in a plebiscite. With the failure of the project, as well as his definitive fall from power in the late 1870s, he died in Hormigueros, Puerto Rico, in 1884. His remains were repatriated in 1914, under the government of his son Ramón Báez.

== Early years and family ==
Báez was born on July 14, 1812, in Rincón (now Cabral) in the Captaincy General of Santo Domingo during the years of España Boba. He was raised in his father's hometown of Azua. Báez was the son of Pablo Altagracia Báez and Teresa de Jesús Méndez.

His father Pablo, a wealthy merchant from Azua, was left in an orphanage when he was born, as he was the result of an extramarital affair between Josefa Morales de Firpo (a married Spanish woman) (Note: Sources give the surname of Pablo's mother's husband as Firpo. At that time (circa 1770), the Firpo family comprised the children of Italian immigrant Gaetano Firpo: Rosa Firpo, who lived in Santiago with her husband the Canarian immigrant Domingo Sánchez Moreno (second-great-grandfather of President Ulises Espaillat); Cayetano Firpo, a seargeant who lived in Azua with his wife Josefa Morales; and Mateo Firpo (died 1788), who lived in Santo Domingo with his wife Isabel Magallanes. All of the children of Gaetano married in the 1760s. Given that the only man in Azua bearing the surname Firpo was Cayetano, Pablo's mother was Josefa Morales.) and priest and author, the mulatto Father Antonio Sánchez-Valverde. Pablo was raised by a French silversmith (a factor that generated a deep francophilia in both Pablo and Buenaventura) known as Monsieur Capellier, and became a wealthy businessman, slaveholder and politician. Teresa de Jesús Méndez was a mixed-race former slave from Rincón. She was born to a slave and a master, and was sold to Pablo Altagracia Báez, who freed her to take her as his mistress when his wife María Quezada told him to do so when realized that she was infertile herself; Pablo and Teresa had seven children.

Báez was light-haired and blue-eyed like his father, but had curly hair and was somewhat swarthy, earning the nickname of Jabao. Cultured and good-looking, Báez was very popular among women, especially because of his gallantry. Eager to build a bright future for his first-born son, Pablo Báez sent him to study in England. Buenaventura Báez did not pursue formal university studies, but from a young age he stood out for his attention to culture.

In the European continent, he learned various languages, including English and French.

Until the end of his life, he was a voracious reader, which allowed him to learn about the main social and political theories and be aware of the evolution of international processes. His prolonged stay in Europe placed him above the cultural average of young people from the ruling social sector, at a time when there were no higher education institutions. His father's wealth and talent facilitated an early foray into Haitian politics as a representative of the Azua region. In addition to his love for politics, Báez showed interest in business, like his father. In the early days of his adult life, before devoting himself fully to the struggle for power, he helped his father increase the family's wealth. When his father died in 1841, Báez, aged 29, inherited a large fortune that he used assiduously in politics, becoming elected in 1843 deputy to the Haitian Constituent Assembly.

== Independence conspiracy ==
=== As a deputy of Azua ===
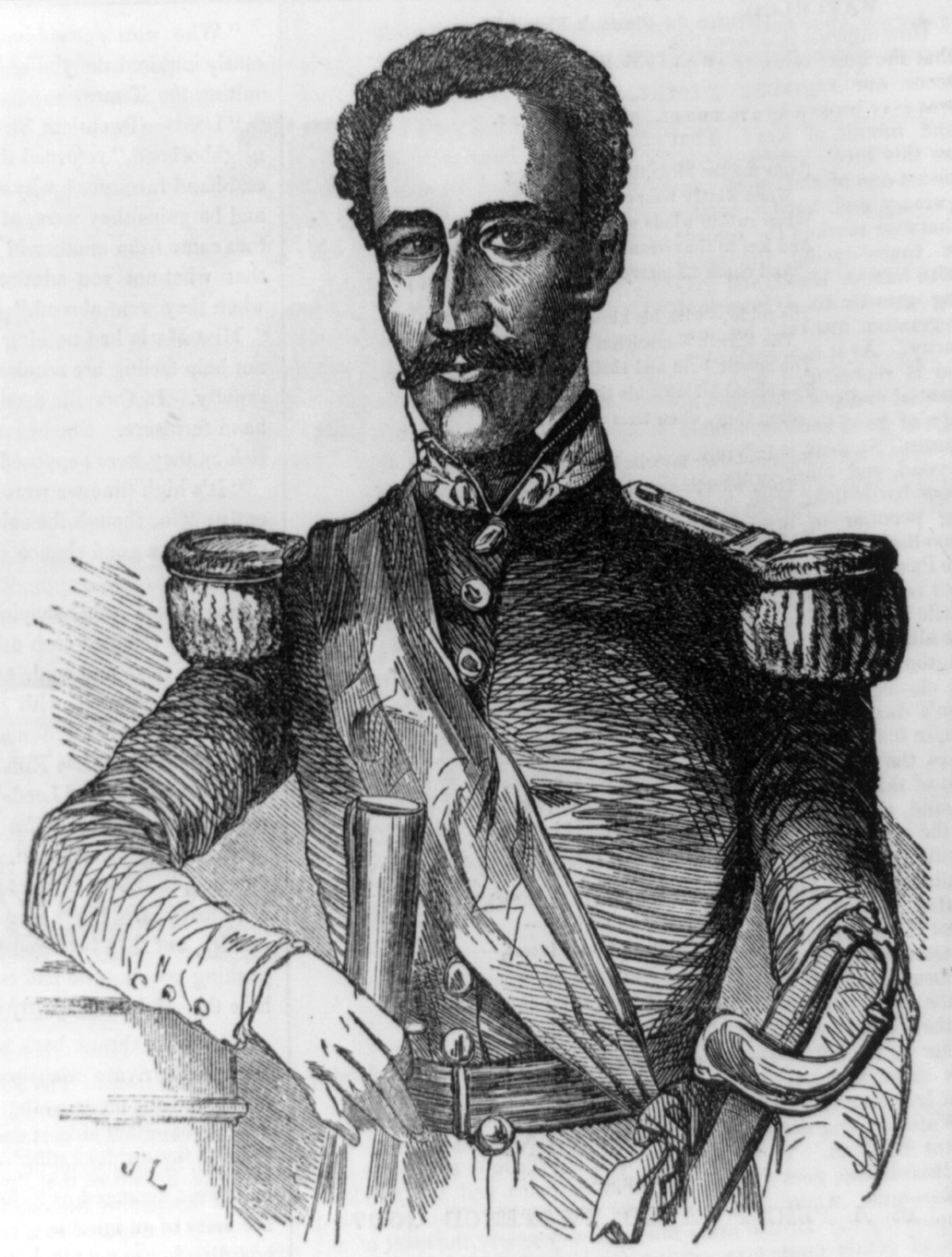
Portrait of Báez in 1854

At the beginning of 1843, an armed movement that was called the Reform broke out in Les Cayes, the third-largest city in Haiti, and the nucleus of the liberal mulatto sector. President Jean Pierre Boyer, who had ruled as an autocrat since 1818, soon had to abdicate. Those who overthrew Boyer in theory intended to establish a democratic regime, for which they convened a constituent assembly, which met during the second half of 1843 and approved a new constitution that replaced the one of 1816. Thanks to his gifts and influence, Báez was elected representative of Azua to the constituent assembly. His public life began there. He gained a place in the political world with proposals that attracted attention and positioned him as a representative figure of the interests of the Dominican ruling sectors.

As a deputy, Báez led a faction of Dominicans that tried, but failed, to remove the anti-white bias in the Haitian Constitution. Báez presented on that occasion a proposal to repeal the constitutional clause that stipulated that no white person could own property in Haitian territory. He argued that this prevented the entry of capital and immigrants from other countries, which were essential for economic progress. It can be seen that the germ of what would always be the central component in Báez's concerns: that the country would enter a path of progress similar to that followed by the countries of Western Europe and the United States. The counterpart to this conception consisted of the conviction that the country lacked the means to achieve progress on its own, so it was obliged to seek the protection of a great power or, if feasible, integrate as part of it.

=== Independence conspiracy ===
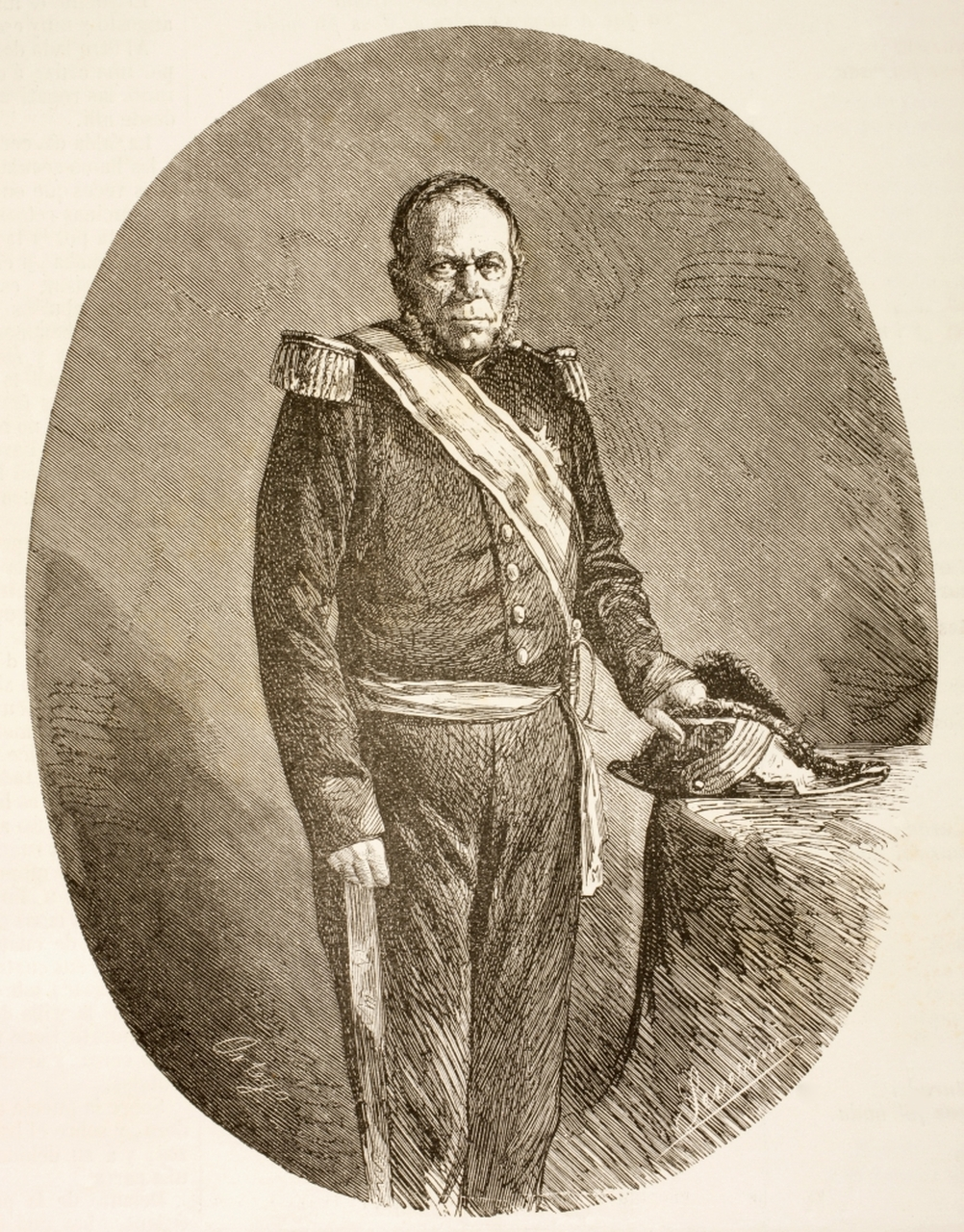
As preparations were in process, Báez aligned himself with other powerful conservative figures in favor of the separation from Haiti. One such figure was Pedro Santana, General of the southern army who would later become his political rival in the upcoming decades.

Báez was, at first, completely and totally against any move to leave the union with Haiti. Then, on December 15, 1843, Báez, as leader of the Dominican legislative faction, proposed to French consul Auguste Levasseur to establish a French protectorate in the Spanish-speaking side of the island with a governor appointed by Paris, in exchange for guns and warships to compel or fight Port-au-Prince for a retreat. The diplomat proposed a plan so that the Dominican Republic would be governed by a French governor for a period of 10 years, with the possibility of extensions; it would donate the Samaná Peninsula to France, and would be willing to collaborate in the event that France launched a war to reconquer Haiti. The proposal, although confidential in nature, was called the Levasseur Plan, and was welcomed by the Dominican representatives in the Haitian capital, from which the adjective "Frenchified" originated. The French consul, without authorization from his government, conceived this plan as the first step towards Haiti becoming a French colony again. Dominican conservatives saw the opportunity to free themselves from Haitian domination and obtain the help of a power to take off towards progress.

Consul Levasseur was very well disposed and constantly exchanged correspondence between Paris and the conspirators. They considered that Haitian rule placed them in a subordinate situation that prevented them from developing business and, in general, developing their interests. The sentiment was taking shape largely because the Dominican economy was experiencing a certain dynamism, while the Haitian economy remained stagnant.

Upon learning of the efforts of the Trinitarios, at the beginning of 1844, Báez, who had good relations with Haitian officials, denounced Gabino Puello, brother of José Joaquín Puello, when he arrived in Azua with the January 16 manifesto. Puello escaped capture by the warning given to him by the future general Valentín Alcántara. As the proclamation of independence on February 27 clashed with his political plans, Báez tried to oppose it in Azua, which led to his arrest and sent to Santo Domingo. He tried futilely to prevent the publication of a copy of the Dominican Act of Independence in Azua, and, in February, did not allow the flag of the newly Dominican state to be raised in the city plaza; in part, he was very pessimistic due to the numerical superiority of Haitians and thought that a rebellion against Port-au-Prince with no foreign support was futile. Báez and the other French supporters launched a manifesto – the text of which has been lost – on January 1, 1844, through which they called for the founding of the Dominican Republic under the protection of France. The progression of the work of Báez's group was what pushed the Trinitarios, led by Francisco del Rosario Sánchez, to establish an alliance with a sector of the conservatives headed by Tomás Bobadilla. Together they wrote the January 16 manifesto, which also called for the constitution of the Dominican Republic, but as a sovereign state. He changed his mind once he saw the popular fervor and decided that the time had come to part ways with Port-au-Prince.

A few days later, he was released and returned to Azua with the expeditionary force, alongside his leader Pedro Santana, with whom he established good relations. Using his powers as general-in-chief of the Southern Front, Santana appointed Báez to the rank of colonel, and as such he was close to the events that culminated in the Battle of Azua. Once the campaign was over, Báez found that the Haitian troops, when they captured and burned Azua, caused the destruction of much of his family's wealth. In the following years, Báez's political prominence would bring him considerable losses of his assets. Santana and Báez agreed on the convenience of seeking French protection, both convinced that the country lacked the resources to face the Haitian military threat. When the Trinitarios dismissed the conservatives from the Central Government Board – the provisional collegiate government established on 27 February – Báez was one of those who had to hide and requested asylum at the French consulate. During the first years after independence, despite his ability, Báez was a background figure, possibly because he remained in the minds of many who had tried to oppose the birth of the Republic. Some versions later propagated by his enemies confirmed details of the denunciation of the conspiracy led by the Trinitarios. Although Santana considered him one of his own, it seems that in those years he kept him at a certain distance, perhaps considering him as an individual with too much personal independence.

== Constitution of 1844 ==
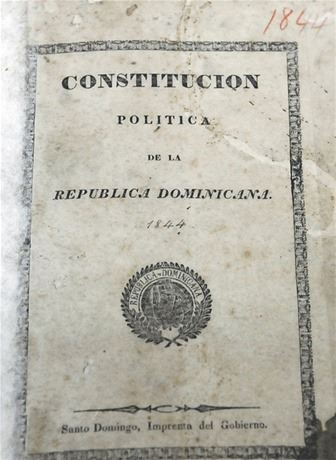
Constitution of San Cristóbal, passed on November 6, 1844.

Despite his equivocal attitude towards the independence, Báez had to be taken into account for his talent and his relationships in Azua and other places with prominent social figures. He was elected to the constituent assembly that met in San Cristóbal and approved the first constitution of the Dominican Republic, on November 6, 1844. Being the most capable of said constituent body, he took the main initiatives in the work. At his motion, it was agreed that the persons of the constituents were inviolable while they performed their functions, a way of distancing themselves from the overwhelming influence of Santana. In those days, a situation of tension developed between the members of the Central Government Board and the constituents, despite the fact that both parties had conservative positions. Several of the delegates to the assembly showed reluctance to the absolute power to which Santana aspired. This only renewed the possible hatred that Santana could have had in those days towards Báez.

Due to Báez's experience in the constituent assembly of Port-au-Prince the previous year, the delegates meeting in San Cristobal agreed that he would direct the commission in charge of drafting the draft constitution. The bulk of the document appears to have been the work of Báez. Understanding that the establishment of a modern political order was coming, similar to that existing in "civilized" countries, Báez was inspired above all by the United States constitution, although he also took into account the Haitian constitution, which he knew inside and out. The document approved in November 1844 was not exactly liberal in nature – for example, it established restrictions on the right to elect and be elected – but it contained many aspects of the liberal conception, such as the separation of powers. Those Dominican conservatives of 1844, among whom Báez stood out, applied a criterion according to which the conservative regime to which they aspired, with the mandate to safeguard traditional interests, should be governed by precepts taken from the modern liberal current. Santana was appointed president for two consecutive terms in the constitution. But he refused to take office under the rather liberal clauses contained in the Magna Carta. He demanded, without hesitation, that absolute powers be recognized. The constituents were forced to include the famous article 210, which granted the president dictatorial powers.

== First presidency ==
In 1846, Báez was assigned to carry out a mission in France and England in order to obtain recognition of the Dominican Republic. That representation lasted about two years, during which time Báez was isolated from government affairs. Upon returning to the country, he was appointed a member of the Conservative Council, the name of the upper house then, known today in our country as the Senate. In the debates of that organization he distinguished himself as an exponent of proposals aimed at having the country adopt precepts that would prepare it for modern life. Báez was then a conservative with strong shades of liberalism and a bourgeois progressive sense.

Despite his personal notoriety, Báez's performance was discreet in those years. Perhaps that was why Santana did not object when he was elected by the congressmen for the presidency of the Republic, on September 24, 1849, after Manuel Jimenes was dismissed and Santiago Espaillat refused to accept the position under the conditions of Santana's preeminence. Furthermore, Báez had been the promoter of the appointment of Santana as supreme chief of the army in April 1849, when it was feared that the Haitian ruler Faustin Soulouque would arrive before the walls of Santo Domingo. This relevant position in favor of Santana made it easier for the latter to abandon the doubts he had about such a bold and capable politician. (Báez was the first president to serve the term for which he was elected, something that in the 19th century, they could only achieve it again, in once, and the presidents after 1880, Fernando Arturo de Meriño and Ulises Heureaux).

His administration contrasted with that of Santana, since he maintained Jimenes's position of not engaging in repressive acts. He respected freedom of the press and the resentments left by Santana's dictatorial management diminished. One of the distinctive notes of this management was the order in the management of budgetary resources, which made it possible to limit the damage caused by the circulation of paper money. Báez also introduced a new military concept, thanks to the advice of French officers who advised offensive maritime actions against Haiti.

Despite the scarcity of resources, the unique conservative president with liberal edges had the good sense to care about the promotion of education. During that period of government, at his request, the San Buenaventura School was founded which, although it did not have a university level, brought together the most select spirits of the country and contributed to forming the generation of intellectuals that followed the birth of the Republic. He managed to gain the support of some young intellectuals and officials, to whom he assigned preeminent positions, such as Manuel María Gautier, Nicolás Ureña de Mendoza, and Félix María del Monte. Possibly all of this provoked envy among the members of Santana's inner circle, who must have felt displaced by an emerging and rival group. At the end of the four-year period, in February 1853, he transferred the presidency to Santana, who had expressed interest in occupying it again. Shortly after, the new president sharply denounced Báez and ordered his expulsion from the country, possibly because he feared that he would try to become the dominant figure.

From exile, Báez prepared the bases for the open confrontation with Santana. Thus a division emerged within the conservative side, which was unprecedented, since until then Santana had been recognized as its undisputed leader. Santana's contradictions with some conservatives had not led to the formation of a rival current. Báez, on the other hand, had a strong political will, intelligence and money, and enjoyed the advantage of having carried out a government administration far superior to that of Santana. Therefore, all those who repudiated Santana's actions had no other option than to align themselves behind the leadership of their enemy. Báez was concerned about expanding as much as possible the support base that would allow him to return to power. On the one hand, he questioned the dominance of the reduced oligarchy that accompanied Santana. Perhaps due to his condition as a mulatto, he made it known that he considered himself a representative of the interests of the colored population, against the exclusivism of the whites, and proclaimed himself the standard bearer of the poor majority, especially the peasants. The truth is that, despite such proclamations, he never stopped being a conservative who used the defense of the humble as a demagogic resource. He did not believe in the sovereign realization of the national conglomerate, but in a progress designed to benefit the upper portion of society.

In his fight against Santana, in addition to running as a tribune of the people, Báez tried to attract the support of the greatest number of sectors. He was very skillful in presenting his proposal as compatible with everyone, which is why his popularity grew. First, he offered the clergy compensation and treatment different from that which Santana had given him. Secondly, he sought to obtain the support of the European consuls, in order to question Santana's pro-North American position. Additionally, he attracted the support of the liberal and cultured youth of the city of Santo Domingo, who abhorred Santana's absolutism. On his way to Santo Domingo, Antonio María Segovia, first Spanish consul, met with Báez in Saint Thomas, the island where he was exiled. The diplomat arrived with the mission of hindering the advance of United States influence. Upon settling in Santo Domingo, Segovia announced that all Dominicans who requested it would receive Spanish nationality, which the Baecistas took advantage of to oppose Santana. Faced with growing popular opposition that had the support of European consuls, Santana chose to resign when it became impossible for him to lease Samaná to the United States.

== Second presidency ==
Shortly after Santana left power, Báez returned to the country and resumed the presidency in October 1856. He immediately ordered General José María Cabral, one of his supporters, to arrest Santana, who was deported. For several weeks the Baecistas were in full euphoria, celebrating Santana's misfortune. In his second administration, Báez took a transcendental measure, consisting of issuing a large amount of paper money during the tobacco harvest in the surroundings of Santiago, supposedly with the intention of protecting farmers. This item was already the one that left the largest sums in exports.

During the harvest period, the price of paper money revalued because the amount of gold in circulation increased due to the shipments made by foreign merchants to buy the tobacco harvest. Peasants bought and sold in paper money. When they went into debt with merchants, by acquiring goods in advance for subsistence, they did so at a devalued rate of banknotes, since there was little circulation of gold coins; However, during the harvest, they had to immediately pay off the debts at a revalued rate due to the abundant circulation of gold, which was unfavorable for them. Such seasonal differences in the price were used by merchants to increase their profits through loans at usurious rates.

Alleging that that year the agio against the harvesters had reached exorbitant levels, Báez ordered an issue of national paper pesos, with the declared purpose of improving the prices that the harvesters would receive in transactions with merchants, and subsequently made successive issues until reach several million pesos. Without a doubt, the issuance of paper money and its subsequent devaluation immediately benefited the farmers, who could thus obtain a better price for tobacco and pay more comfortably the debts they had contracted with the merchants. But with the measure the central government entered into open conflict with the commercial sector of Cibao, the richest area of the country. The merchants faced the risk of bankruptcy, not only because their profit margins decreased, but because the government dispatched agents with large amounts of banknotes in order to acquire a considerable portion of the harvest and hoard the largest possible amount of strong pesos in gold.

It is believed that behind this operation could have been hidden the purpose of strengthening the regime at the expense of Cibao's regional interests. It is also possible that Báez conceived the measure for personal gain. The result was that the merchants and other urban sectors of Cibao understood that they were being victims of intolerable aggression from the central government, so they chose to declare rebellion. On July 7, 1857, an uprising broke out in Santiago that spread quickly throughout the country and left the Baecistas isolated behind the walls of Santo Domingo. Báez's supporters in other places, such as generals Pedro Florentino in La Vega, and José Hungría in Santiago, were neutralized without major difficulty. In addition to Santo Domingo, the pro-government groups were only able to put up resistance in Higüey and Samaná. On that occasion, taken by surprise, the Cibaeño peasants could not express the gratitude that they were surely already beginning to feel for Báez.

The enlightened young people of Santo Domingo gave enthusiastic support to Báez, especially when Santana took charge of the operations against the besieged city. Francisco del Rosario Sánchez and José María Cabral, two highly prestigious figures, directed the defense operations of the capital. After 11 months of siege, Báez capitulated, but remained a power alternative to Santana, who overthrew the Cibao liberals who had started the 7 July revolution.

== Annexation period ==
When the annexation to Spain was proclaimed in March 1861, Báez was in Europe and did not interfere with the position taken by his supporters in exile to oppose the fact. Several prominent Baecistas, such as Manuel María Gautier and Valentín Ramírez Báez, brother of the caudillo, had joined Francisco del Rosario Sánchez, in a Revolutionary Junta, to fight against the annexation to the metropolis. Immediately, Báez did not disavow his supporters, but he kept his distance from their efforts. Although, when the annexationist regime was consolidated, Báez offered his services to the Spanish monarchy, surely calculating that it would not take long for conflicts to arise between Santana and the Spanish, which in that case would allow him to become the dominant figure in the Spanish administration. In return, the queen of Spain, Isabel II, named him field marshal. Given the position of their leader, the Baecistas abroad distanced themselves from patriotic efforts.

When the Dominican Restoration War broke out, Báez adopted a cautious attitude and chose to settle in Paris, but at no time did he resign from his position in the Spanish Army. The rebellion against Spanish rule had no relationship with the previously existing flags. Former supporters of Santana and Báez participated equally, as well as people who had not taken part in that conflict. This explains why, despite the support that Báez gave to the Spanish government, many of his supporters who had remained within the country took part in the Restoration War. For example, the first president of the restoration government of Santiago, José Antonio Salcedo, was known as a Baecista, as was Pedro Florentino, who was appointed head of operations in the south. The leadership that Báez continued to hold was evidenced by the fact that, despite his adherence to Spain, President Salcedo proposed to manage his return to the country to hand over the presidency to him. That loyalty to his leader was one of the reasons for the dismissal and execution of Salcedo, since the head of the restoration army, Gaspar Polanco, had been a supporter of Santana, and the civilian heads of the government in Santiago were leaders of the rebellion against Báez in 1857.

== Third presidency ==
=== Return to office ===
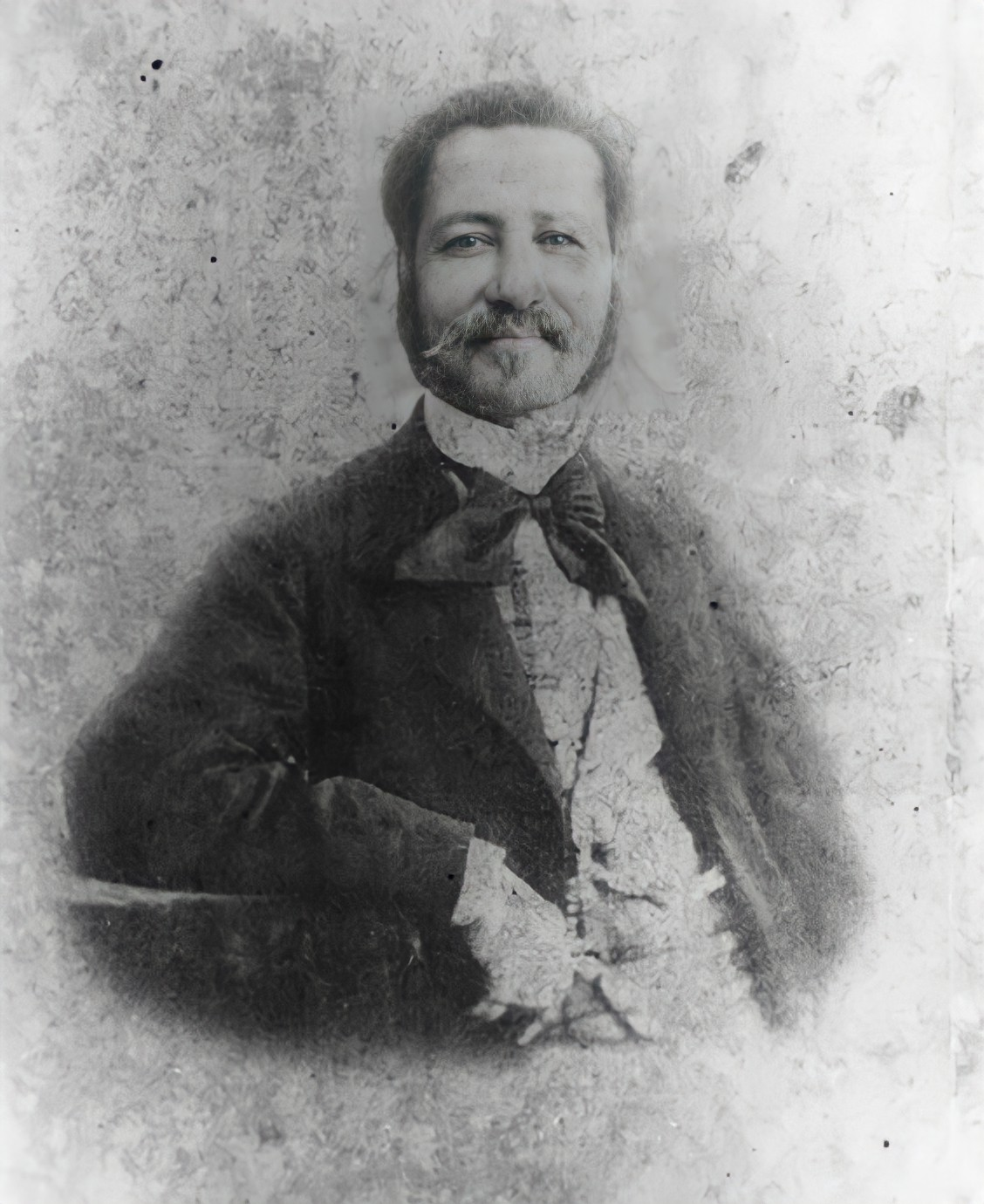
Photograph of Báez c. 1860s-1870s

Báez renounced his rank in the Spanish Army only after the peninsular troops abandoned the island, and he believed that his support for the Spanish government had been a mistake that would keep him away from the country for a long time. He settled in Curaçao to wait patiently for the development of events, surely calculating that, in the long run, he had factors in his favor despite his mistake. He was sure he was close to the ripe fruit. The first thing he had to consider was that, with Santana gone, there was no other experienced leader capable of gathering the forces to establish a stable government.

In the midst of the disorderly emergence of the leaders, who had gained power in the restoration struggle, Báez could expect that conflicts would continue to emerge among them that, sooner or later, would regain their validity. Furthermore, he may have realized that he had many supporters in the restoration ranks, among them was José María Cabral, who held the presidency after the departure of the Spanish, was recognized as a former Baecista. The generals of the Restoration, for the most part, lacked cohesion and a complete government project. Only a few had become involved with the liberal principles adopted by the members of the Santiago command. These gave rise to a liberal current that became known as the Blue Party. They proposed to establish an institutionalized democratic regime that would guarantee national sovereignty and the country's march towards progress.

The conceptions of the liberals clashed head-on with Báez's personal aspirations. However, at first the positions were not completely demarcated, which explains why several restorative generals from the east, followers of Báez, led by Pedro Guillermo, set up a movement in October 1865 to overthrow Cabral, who did not confront them, but instead agreed to hand over the presidency to his former boss, Buenaventura Báez, whom he went to Curaçao to look for in November.

Upon taking possession of the presidency without opposition, Báez appointed Cabral as Secretary of War and Pedro Antonio Pimentel, another of the main champions of the Restoration, as Secretary of the Interior. Gregorio Luperón, among the leading men of arms, refused all dealings with the new president and tried unsuccessfully to build a movement against him. However, some civil figures felt astonished by the course of events, which was expressed by the priest Fernando Arturo de Meriño, in the investiture speech of the new president, when he reproached him for having been indifferent to the struggle of the people against Spanish rule. Uncomfortable due to his dependence on figures whose fidelity was not yet guaranteed, Báez conceived measures to consolidate himself in the presidency. One of them was to distribute 200 pesos, a considerable sum at the time, to the generals who participated in the Restoration War. But above all, he put his administrative skills into play to affirm the idea that only he was capable of making government management more efficient.

His popularity recovered without major difficulties, since the sentiment of the people did not take into account his previous accession to Spain. In a country destroyed after two years of war, the population only wanted the government to improve the situation. In his memoirs, Luperón admits the popularity of his enemy, which he explains by the memory that the monetary devaluation of 1857 left in the peasant population. Báez was concerned at all times to feed back his image as protector of the poor people, which would allow him to differentiate himself from the blue liberals, who under the two Cabral governments gave priority to the recomposition of the commercial elite, a sector that they saw as the generator of progress.

=== Clashes with the Blue Party ===
In 1866, Báez's preeminence had not yet been fully recovered because most of the Restoration generals – the main leading sector of public affairs – had not previously participated in national politics and, therefore, had not They were baecistas. This situation allowed some of the leaders of the Restoration to join forces against Báez, apparently because they perceived that he was working to acquire absolute prerogatives. Cabral went abroad, spoke out against the government and prepared to prepare an expedition to Haiti. Luperón landed in Puerto Plata, where Governor Manuel Rodríguez Objío turned his back on the executive, and the movement spread throughout Cibao. The government assigned Pedro A. Pimentel, Secretary of the Interior, to crush the insurrection, but upon arriving in Cibao he changed sides. Báez fell within a few days and left the country again. It is not surprising that from now on the anti-Baecista party had Cabral, Luperón, and Pimentel as leaders. But among them there were almost constant differences, while in the rival party there was a single leadership in the hands of Báez, despite the fact that he relied on leaders of primitive stock.

It was following the fall of Báez's third government when the open demarcation between his supporters and the liberals occurred. To settle differences, a provisional triumvirate was appointed among the liberals, but finally the presidency fell to Cabral, the most influential of the three generals. The country was polarized between those who shouted "long live Báez" and those who opposed him. The red and blue colors used in the Cibaeño Revolution were resumed, so many have maintained that the blues of 1866 were the former supporters of Santana, opposed to Báez for personal reasons. As Manuel Rodríguez Objío explains in his book Relationships, this is an erroneous conclusion, because the National Party was nourished by the liberals of Santiago and people who were just starting out in politics, although he recognizes that some old Santanistas joined them through their dislike of Báez.

Despite having a large part of the intellectuals, the ineptitude of the blues in managing public affairs was taken advantage of by Báez. In a short time he obtained the support of almost all the leaders who had taken part in the Restoration War. Even Benito Monción and Federico de Jesús García, two of the most notable leaders of the last national war on the Northwest Line, and until shortly before joining the blue ranks, joined the red side. The return of Báez was a demand of the vast majority of the population, so the leaders, who idolized him, tended to take up arms. Hardly in the rest of Dominican history has a similar phenomenon of such popularity of a political leader occurred.

In October 1867, a revolt broke out in Monte Cristi, led by Francisco Antonio Gómez and other Baecista leaders, which could no longer be contained. Luperón narrates in his memoirs that the Cibaeño peasants rose up en masse against the liberals in government and surrounded the cities. Cabral's second administration ended up being completely discredited when it was learned that he had authorized negotiations to lease the Samaná peninsula to the United States in exchange for a sum of money and weapons in order to crush the caudillos. Báez and his followers, raising a nationalism of opportunity, accused Cabral of treason.

=== Six Years' War ===
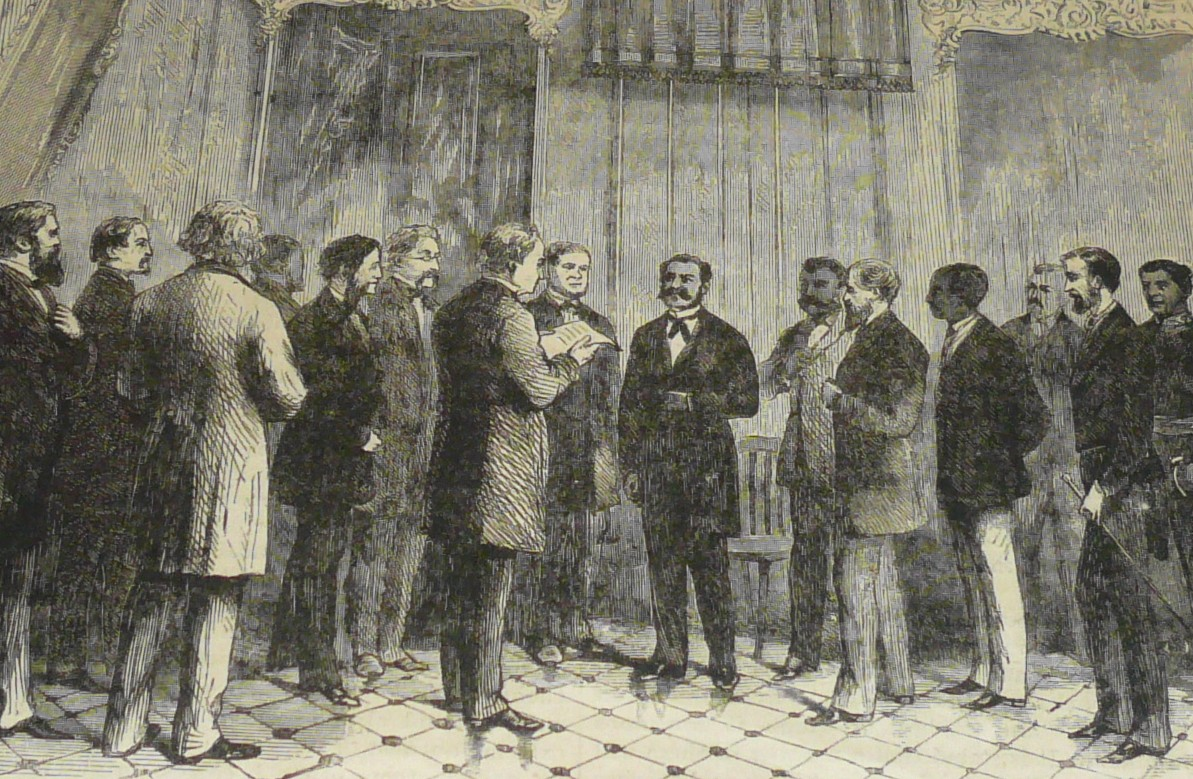
Báez, still convinced that the Nation was still in a political and economic crisis, proposed a deal to annex the Dominican Republic to the United States.

The Reds forced Cabral to capitulate in January 1868, and Báez resumed the presidency some time later. Although he rejected the dictatorship offered by his followers, he set out to establish an iron regime that would guarantee his indefinite permanence. As has been expressed, he enjoyed the support of the majority of the people, who, as Sócrates Nolasco highlights in Old Memories, firmly believed that the conservative president guaranteed their well-being through high tobacco prices. This support was manifested through the almost unanimity in his favor expressed by the leaders, the strong and influential men of each region of the country.

For their part, the blues represented minority urban circles that believed that it was necessary to subdue the leaders and establish a modern political system. Almost all intellectuals identified with the blues, but the merchants ended up kowtowing to Báez, convinced that he guaranteed stability and was the only politician endowed with the knowledge required to govern efficiently. However, the blue ones were valid because they represented the proposal to establish a modern system. Sure of the reason for their cause, the blues did not care that they had been isolated from the majority of the population. As soon as they were removed from power, the liberals set out to overthrow Báez, for which they proceeded to ally themselves with the Haitians led by Nissage Saget. Cabral headed to Haiti and began operations on the southern border, where he had prestige for having been the last head of the Restoration there. He gained the support of some generals, especially the Ogando brothers, and was able to start a war that lasted for more than four years.

The blue guerrillas in the south proclaimed themselves the embodiment of the Dominican patriotic tradition, emphasizing that independence was in danger due to the annexationist efforts of the red government. Indeed, since he became president and taking advantage of the expansionist interest of Washington government circles, Báez had entered into negotiations to annex the country to the United States. In November 1869, a preliminary convention was signed, after which a plebiscite was held, in which only 11 votes were recorded against the annexation. The consultation was held under conditions of extreme political repression, which prevented people from spontaneously demonstrating. In any case, it is certain that the majority of the population agreed with the annexation for the simple fact that Báez proposed it and because he saw it as a means to escape wars and poverty; but also, with absolute certainty, a not insignificant portion was opposed by patriotic considerations.

As the war led by Cabral gained some support for its patriotic content, the government unleashed measures of terror to extirpate its enemies. The prisons were filled with political prisoners and many opponents were forced to flee the country to avoid assassination or imprisonment. In repressive tasks, the red government used thugs who dedicated themselves to applying terror with an unprecedented ferocity in the country, murdering hundreds of people. These hitmen were widely known in the southwest by their nicknames, such as Solito, Baúl, Musié, Llinito, and Mandé. They sneaked behind the guerrilla lines, beyond the Yaque del Sur, where they dedicated themselves to killing everyone they found.

Wherever the blues tried to rebel, the government applied bloody repression, as General José Caminero did in the east, in operations against the guerrilla of the restorer general Eusebio Manzueta, who was captured and shot. In Cibao, the liberals could not do anything, given the unwavering support of the peasants who they saw as the savior of high tobacco prices, so the government delegate, Manuel Altagracia Cáceres, did not have to resort to terror.

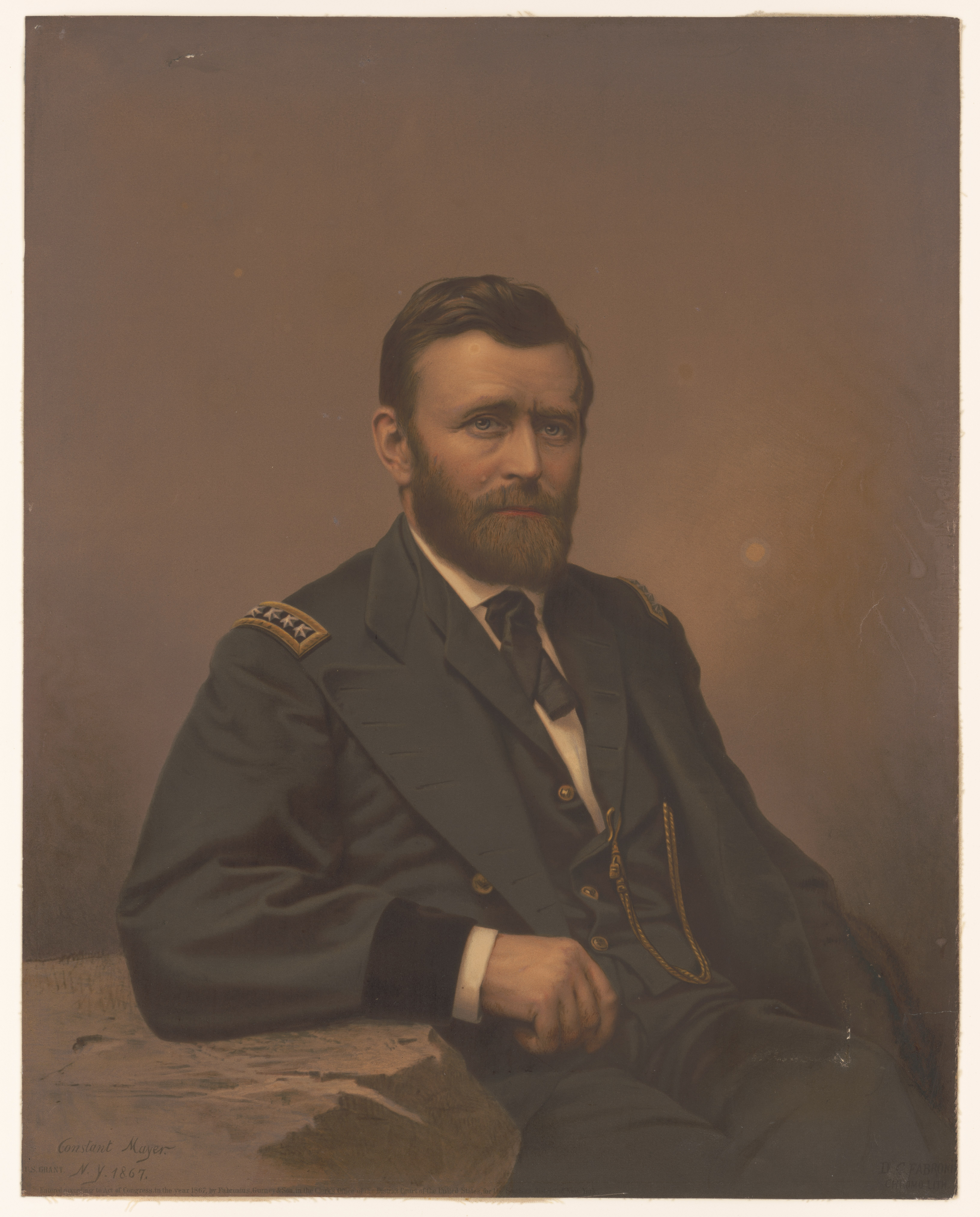
US President Ulysses S. Grant

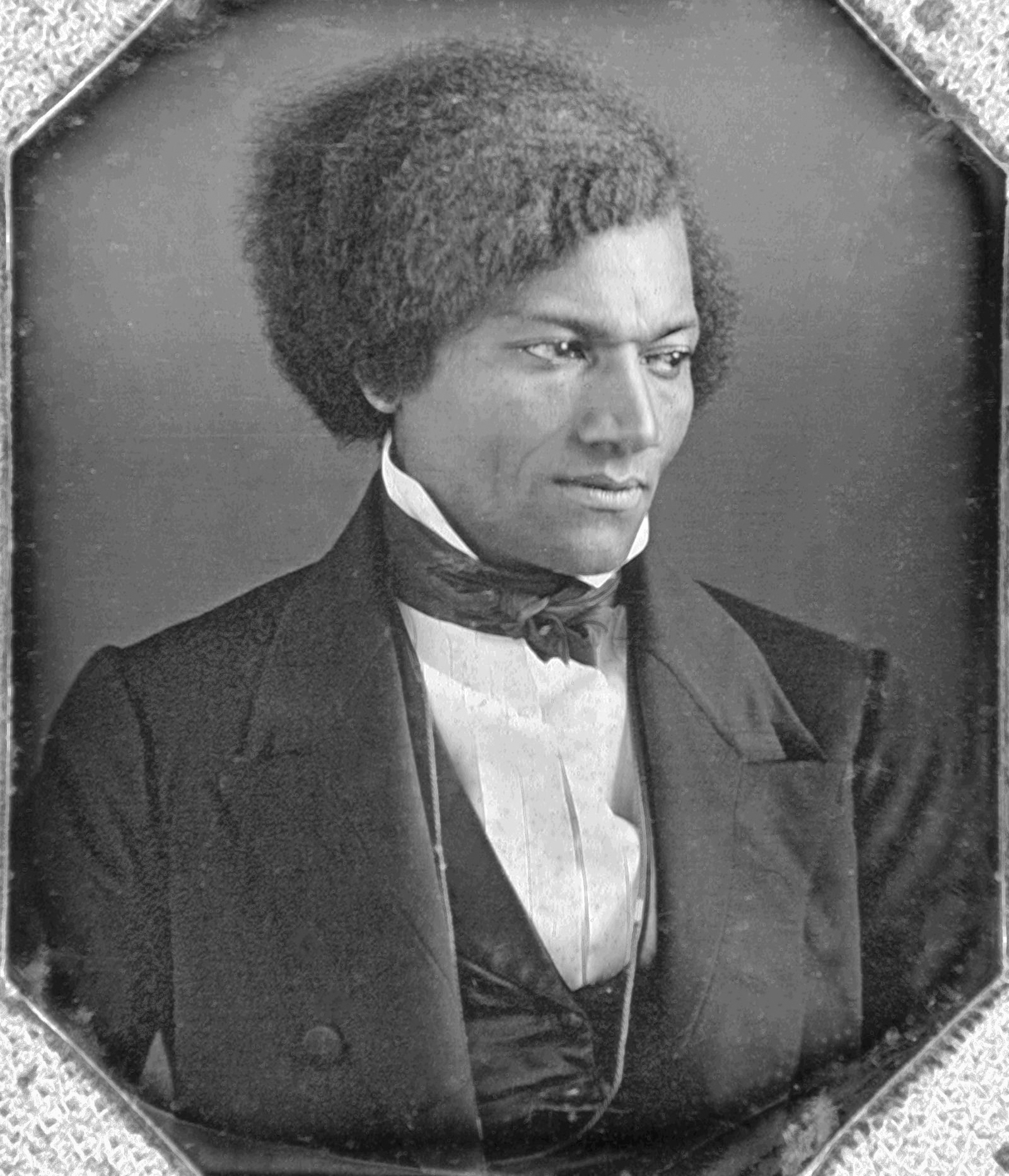
American abolitionist Frederick Douglass

For various reasons, the country's economic situation continued to be desperate. The fate of the fourth Báez administration depended on obtaining extraordinary financial resources, in order to gain time and be able to complete the annexation to the United States. To that end, the government appointed Edward Hartmont as financial agent in England, who received authorization to contract a loan. This Jewish banker committed an extravagant fraud, as he issued bonds for more than 400,000 pounds sterling and only delivered 38,000 to the Dominican government. The small sum received did not allow the government to overcome the precariousness. Not even the secretaries of state received their emoluments regularly. Báez showed consistency, guaranteeing the correct use of scarce resources, and devotion to the Red Party led everyone to show a willingness to sacrifice. The reality was that, after the annexation to the United States, Báez had big business plans planned in conjunction with officials close to President Ulysses S. Grant and the adventurers William Cazneau and Joseph Fabens, inspirers of everything that was woven. This even allowed him to become well acquainted with the abolitionist leader, Frederick Douglass.

The US Senate rejected the annexation treaty in 1871, so Báez's fall was a matter of time. The Dominican government still maintained hope in relations with the Americans, since a parallel preliminary treaty had been signed to lease the Samaná peninsula in exchange for annuities of 150,000 dollars, the first of which was paid by Washington. The United States flag flew over the peninsula during those years, which was used by American filibusters to form a company for speculative purposes, the Samana Bay Company. The rental amount was a relatively high sum for the era, but this did not prevent the unrest from spreading. Now, Báez's fourth administration had been consolidated despite the difficult economic situation, to the point that the insurrection in the south was defeated at the beginning of 1873. Wherever the blues tried to stick their head out, they were crushed. Under these circumstances, the only way for Báez to fall was if he did so at the hands of his own followers.

Given the impotence of the liberals and the wear and tear of the administration, it did not take long for various opposition demonstrations to take place within the ranks of the reds against their president. The focus of discontent was located on the Northwest Line. To complete the wear and tear, on 25 November 1873, the pillars of Baecism in Cibao, Ignacio María González, governor of Puerto Plata, and Manuel Altagracia Cáceres, government delegate, took up arms and in a few days forced their former boss to present his resignation. In addition to the serious economic situation, a constitutional reform that expanded Báez's powers and allowed him to be re-elected indefinitely caused discomfort.

November 25 marked the end of Báez's central role in Dominican politics. New national leaders began to emerge from the red ranks, while the blues, under the leadership of Gregorio Luperón, began to slowly expand their influence. The leaders were divided and politics was characterized by continuous chaos, in which each faction tried to seize power in a disorderly manner. It seemed that Báez's leadership had been buried, but he did not give up. He still had a considerable portion of the population, and this allowed him to take advantage of the disorder caused by the desire for power. His supporters managed to overthrow the second government of Ignacio María González and he was able to become president for the fifth time at the end of 1876, remaining there for just over a year.

A seasoned politician, Báez realized that in a short time the conditions of the country had undergone changes, that national independence could not be questioned and that public opinion demanded a climate of peace. Upon reaching the presidency for the fifth time, he tried to adapt to these new conditions and proceeded to issue a manifesto in which he criticized himself for previous actions, declaring that democracy and national independence would henceforth be his flags. He immediately received the support of renowned intellectuals of the liberal current, who wanted more than anything else that order and peace be implemented. Even José María Cabral, former head of the blues, accepted a secretary of state in the last administration of the red leader.

However, other blues considered that the president had the intention of establishing himself again as a dictator and that he was secretly deploying annexationist efforts. At the beginning of 1878, a rebellion led by Máximo Grullón and Benito Monción broke out on the Northwest Line, which was followed by other leaders. In the east Cesáreo Guillermo rose, who swept away the government troops in Pomarrosa, near Guerra. Soon, Báez was forced to flee the country, this time for good. In October 1879, Gregorio Luperón overthrew President Cesáreo Guillermo, thus beginning a stable order, characterized by the preponderance of the blues. The seditious attempts of the leaders of the other bands could be crushed, although they required the second blue president, the priest Fernando Arturo de Meriño, to assign himself dictatorial powers and order the summary execution of those who took up arms.

== Death ==
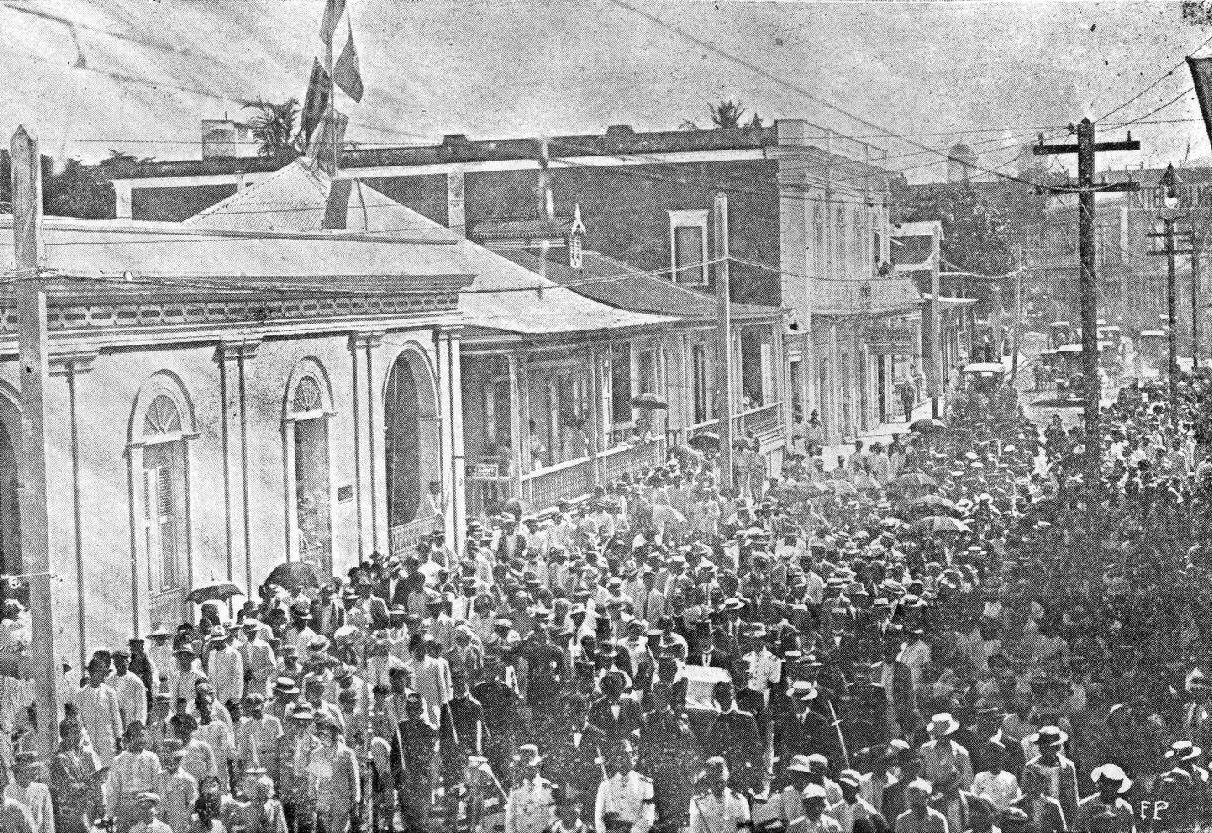
Funeral and burial of Báez in Puerto Rico.

During those years the country experienced a phase of prosperity and conditions changed rapidly. The once prominent figure of Báez lost validity although he continued to be missed by many former followers. Báez died in his home in Hormigueros, in western Puerto Rico, in 1884. The most renowned leaders of the Red Party, such as Manuel María Gautier, chose to ally themselves with Ulises Heureaux, Luperón's pupil who ended up betraying him and adopting the principles autocratic of his former enemies. The forgotten Báez was reincarnated, in a certain way, in Heureaux's autocratic replacement.

He is buried in the Basilica Cathedral of Santa María la Menor.

== Offspring ==
Genealogical studies have identified President Báez, and President Espaillat as well, as the most recent common ancestors for most of the Dominican oligarchy, since their offspring managed to establish bonds with the most rich and powerful families from Santiago, and thus, from the country.

- Ramón Buenaventura Báez Méndez (1812–1884)
  - Manuel Báez Batista (1839–?)
  - Teodoro Osvaldo Buenaventura Báez Machado (1857–?)
    - José Ramón Báez López-Penha (1909–1995)
    - Buenaventura Báez López-Penha (1907-?)
      - Marcos Antonio Báez Cocco
  - Altagracia Amelia Báez Andújar (†1879)
    - José María Cabral y Báez (1864–1937)
      - Amelia María Cabral Bermúdez (1899–1996)
        - Juan Bautista Vicini Cabral (1924–2015)
          - Felipe Augusto Antonio Vicini Lluberes (b. 1960)
          - Amelia Stella María Vicini Lluberes (b. 1974)
          - Juan Bautista Vicini Lluberes (b. 1975)
        - Laura Amelia Vicini Cabral de Barletta (1925–2006)
        - José María Vicini Cabral (1926–2007)
          - José Leopoldo Vicini Pérez
          - Marco Vicini Pérez
        - Felipe Vicini Cabral (1936–1997)
      - Auristela Cabral Bermúdez (1901–1988)
        - Donald Joseph Reid Cabral (1923–2006)
        - William John Reid Cabral (1925–2010)
          - Patricia Reid Baquero (b. 1953)
            - Isabela Egan Reid de Pittaluga
            - Meghan Egan Reid
        - Robert Reid Cabral (1929–1961)
      - José María Cabral Bermúdez (1902–1984)
        - María Josefina Cabral Vega
          - Manuel Díez Cabral (b. 1964)
        - José María Cabral Vega
          - Amalia Josefina Gabriela Cabral Lluberes (b. 1963)
          - Claudia Cabral Lluberes (b. 1964)
            - Ana Amelia Batlle Cabral
            - Laura Emilia Batlle Cabral
          - José María Cabral Lluberes (b. 1967)
        - Petrica Cabral Vega (b. 1938)
          - María Amalia León Cabral (b. 1960)
            - Sarah Amalia Jorge León
          - Lidia Josefina León Cabral (b. 1962)
          - José Eduardo León Cabral (1963–1975)
        - Marco Buenaventura Cabral Vega
      - Marco Antonio Cabral Bermúdez (1906–1973)
      - Josefina Eugenia Cabral Bermúdez (1910–1994)
        - Pedro Ramón Espaillat Cabral
        - Alejandro Augusto Espaillat Cabral
          - Alejandro José Espaillat Imbert
          - Pedro José Espaillat Vélez
          - Carlos José Espaillat Vélez
        - Fineta Rosario Espaillat Cabral
      - Pedro Pablo Cabral Bermúdez (1916–1988)
        - Lucía Amelia Cabral Arzeno de Herrera
        - José María Cabral Arzeno (b. 1959)
          - José María Cabral González (b. 1988)
        - Luis José Cabral Arzeno
        - Lucía Amelia Cabral Arzeno
        - Virginia Cabral Arzeno
    - Ramona Antonio Cabral y Báez
      - Eduardo Sánchez Cabral
    - Buenaventura Cabral y Báez
      - Carmen Amelia Mercedes Cabral Machado
      - Carlos Alberto Cabral Machado
      - Pablo Buenaventura Cabral Machado
    - Mario Fermín Cabral y Báez (1877–1961)
      - Manuel Antonio Cabral Tavares (1907–1999)
        - Alba María Antonia "Peggy" Cabral Cornero (b. 1947)
  - Ramón Báez Machado (1858–1929)
    - Buenaventura Báez Soler
      - Ramón Báez Romano
        - Ramón Buenaventura Báez Figueroa (b. 1956)
          - Ramón Buenaventura Báez Zeller (b. 1982)
          - José Ramón Báez Alvarez (b. 1999)
        - José Miguel Báez Figueroa
          - Raquel Cristina Báez Rauch (b.1985)
          - José Miguel Báez Rauch (b.1988)
            - Gina Sofía Báez Castro (b.2022)
            - Ana Amelia Báez Castro (b.2023)

Mercedes Báez Soler

      - Julio Ernesto de la Rocha Báez
        - Ramón de la Rocha Pimentel (b. 1951)
        - Clarissa Altagracia de la Rocha Pimentel de Torres (b. 1959)

== See also ==
- First Dominican Republic
- Second Dominican Republic
- Cibaeño Revolution
- Six Years' War
- Annexation of Santo Domingo
- Pedro Santana
- Ulysses S. Grant

== Bibliography ==
- Martínez, Rufino. Santana y Báez. Santiago, 1943.
- Martínez, Rufino. Diccionario biográfico-histórico dominicano, 1821-1930. Santo Domingo, 1971.
- Nolasco, Sócrates. Viejas memorias. Santo Domingo, 1968.
- Rodríguez Demorizi, Emilio (ed.). Papeles de Buenaventura Báez. Santo Domingo, 1969.
- Rodríguez Demorizi, Emilio (ed.). Informe de la comisión de investigación de los E. U. A. de 1870. Ciudad Trujillo, 1955.
- Rodríguez Demorizi, Emilio (ed.). Proyecto de anexión de Santo Domingo a Norteamérica. Santo Domingo, 1965.

Political offices
Preceded by Manuel Jimenes	President of the Dominican Republic; 1849–1853	Succeeded by Pedro Santana
Preceded by Antonio Abad Alfau Bustamante	Vice President of the Dominican Republic; 1856	Succeeded by Domingo Daniel Pichardo Pró
Preceded by Manuel de Regla Mota	President of the Dominican Republic; 1856–1858	Succeeded by José Desiderio Valverde
Preceded by Pedro Guillermo	President of the Dominican Republic; 1865–1866	Succeeded by Triumvirate
Preceded by Junta of Generals	President of the Dominican Republic; 1868–1874	Succeeded by Ignacio María González
Preceded by Marcos Antonio Cabral	President of the Dominican Republic; 1876–1878	Succeeded by Council of Secretaries of State
