= Gaspar Polanco =

10th President of the Dominican Republic (1864–1865)

Gaspar Polanco Borbón
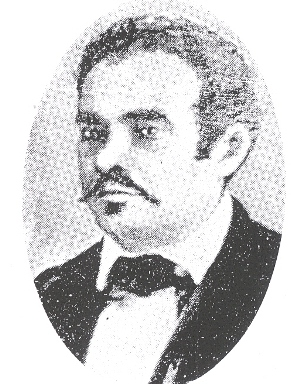

10th President of the Dominican Republic
- In office October 10, 1864 – January 24, 1865
- Vice President: Ulises Francisco Espaillat
- Preceded by: José Antonio Salcedo
- Succeeded by: Benigno Filomeno de Rojas

Personal details
- Born: 1816 Monte Cristi, Captaincy General of Santo Domingo
- Died: November 28, 1867 (aged 50–51) La Vega (aged 52)
- Citizenship: Dominican
- Spouse: María Ortega
- Occupation: Military officer, rancher, tobacco grower, politician

Military service
- Rank: Generalissimo
- Battles/wars: Dominican War of Independence, Dominican Restoration War

Gaspar Polanco Borbón (1816 – November 28, 1867) was a key leader of the Dominican Restoration War.

He has been considered one of the most notable Military affairs geniuses of the History of the Dominican Republic and served as its 10th president. Several historians classify him as "the first sword" of the Dominican Restoration War.

By August 1863 he already held the rank of general, and assumed, as Commander in Chief, leadership of the restoration war owing to his natural intelligence, his extraordinary military ability, and above all because he was the only general of the former Republic.

== Biography ==
Son of Valentín Polanco (1790-), a wealthy cattle rancher from Santiago de los Caballeros, owner of cattle and tobacco plantations, based in Monte Cristi, and of Martina de Borbón. Despite coming from a distinguished bourgeois family, he did not attend school in his childhood and could not read or write, although he did sign his name. His older brother, Juan Antonio Polanco, was also a brigadier general in the Restoration War and one of its principal organizers. His sister, Rita Polanco Borbón, was the wife of fellow restorer Federico de Jesús García His niece Ana Polanco, daughter of Juan Antonio, was the wife of fellow restorer and 9th president of the Dominican Republic Pedro Antonio Pimentel

Polanco Borbón married María Ortega in Santiago de los Caballeros, later settling in Cañeo, Esperanza, in the province of Valverde, where his four sons grew up: Tomás, Francisco, Manuel, and José Mauricio, who devoted themselves to agricultural and livestock activities on the family's holdings in Valverde and in Navarrete.

== Military and political career ==
=== War of Independence ===
In 1844, he took part in the Dominican War of Independence, with the rank of Colonel, distinguishing himself in the Battle of Talanquera and the Battle of Santiago (1844). He distinguished himself in the Military campaign of the Northwest Line with troops from rural areas. In 1848 he was promoted to captain and assigned to the Cavalry units of the Northwest Line, taking part that year and in 1849 in siege, harassment, and attack actions against the Haitian forces stationed in the region along the Maguaca River.

By then Polanco had gained fame as a vanguard soldier and an expert in the terrain of the region, and he was employed, as he would always be, as chief of scouts and of the vanguard. With the rank of lieutenant colonel and chief of the vanguard he distinguished himself in the Battles of Sabana Larga and Jácuba, for which around the same time he was promoted to General of brigade. In 1858, he already held the military command of the La Peñuela Section.

=== Revolution of 1857 ===
Buenaventura Báez was regarded by Gaspar Polanco and his men as an enemy of the interests of the Cibao, since he caused the ruin of the tobacco growers and a severe economic crisis. In July 1857, General Gaspar Polanco led a Revolution together with generals Domingo Mallol and Juan Luis Franco Bido that established a parallel government with José Desiderio Valverde as president and based in Santiago. The capital, Santo Domingo, was besieged from July 31, 1857 until June 13, 1858

=== Spanish Annexation Period ===
As Brigadier General and chief of the Cavalry and the Military Reserves in the Northwest Line, Gaspar Polanco initially remained in the service of Spain upon the consummation of the Annexation, which he supported, convinced by Pedro Santana. In these duties, under the orders of General José Antonio Hungría, Lieutenant Governor in the northern region, he led the Spanish forces that pursued the restorer patriots, among whom was his older brother Juan Antonio Polanco, who in February 1863 attempted to start the war against Spain

=== War of Restoration ===
From August 16 onward, the Spanish brigadier Manuel Buceta and the Spanish are pursued from Capotillo through the entire Northwest Line by Pedro Pimentel, his brother Juan Antonio Polanco, and Benito Monción. The bold and experienced warrior places himself at their side and arrives with them at the outskirts of the city of Santiago, which has begun to be besieged by thousands of men.

He was proclaimed Commander-in-chief of the restorer forces by all the revolutionary caudillos of the region. He was accepted for his qualities as a brave and competent warrior, for having been the only general of the Independence campaigns who had taken part in the movement up to that point, and for his social standing, his prestige, and his authority.

=== The siege of Santiago ===
On August 31, 1863, General Gaspar Polanco rose up from Quinigüa and set out to take Santiago. He led the attack on the city of Santiago on September 6, 1863, which he intended to capture by blood and fire. He made the decision to set fire to part of the town of Santiago, surrounding the San Luis Fortress in a torrent of flames and smoke.

The strategy had the expected effect, since once the city was reduced to ashes, it lost strategic value for the Spanish, who had no way to resupply or take shelter. When those besieged in the San Luis Fortress decided to head out toward Puerto Plata, he pursued them relentlessly, ambushing them at El Carril and El Limón, inflicting numerous losses on the Spanish. At Gurabito he defeated Hungría, Alfau, and Buceta. At Puerto Plata, he also defeated the Spanish. He fought other important battles in the restoration campaign.

Polanco attained the rank of Generalissimo for his efficiency and valor in the siege of Santiago.

== Presidency of the Republic ==
Polanco's dedication to the restorer cause was unquestionable. He did not approve of the hesitant attitude toward the Spanish authorities shown by the government headed by José Antonio Salcedo (Pepillo), who had proclaimed himself president of the Republic without the approval of the majority of the restorers. The restoration revolution had lost momentum due to negligent attitudes and suspicious movements by President Salcedo. Influenced by his brother Juan Antonio, who was educated, he led the rebellion against Salcedo and brought about his overthrow on October 10, 1864.

After removing Salcedo from the presidency, he was president of the Republic in arms from October 10, 1864 until January 24, 1865. During his government, Polanco took some very positive measures for the country in both economic and educational terms. Ulises Francisco Espaillat was his vice president, and his cabinet included fellow restorers Máximo Grullón Salcedo and Silverio Delmonte on the Commission of Interior and Police; and the restorer and poet Manuel Rodríguez Objío on the Commission of Foreign Relations,

He ordered Gregorio Luperón to exile former president Salcedo to Haiti, but the Haitian authorities did not accept him. To avoid risking the success of the restoration, and due to Salcedo's intentions of sponsoring the return of the annexationist caudillo Buenaventura Báez, Polanco, with the approval of the other restorers, ordered Salcedo's execution by firing squad. Despite the resounding success of the restoration campaign, his action against Salcedo overshadowed Polanco Borbón's glory in certain leading circles.

== Overthrow and death ==
He was overthrown from the presidency by a movement, supported by his brother Juan Antonio, led by Pimentel, Monción, and García, who regarded his attempt to monopolize the Tobacco with his friends and relatives as an arbitrary and dictatorial decision, and he went on to devote himself to his ranches and agricultural activities where he resided in Esperanza, Valverde.

After the Republic was restored, Polanco took part in several revolutionary movements, like all those of his time, for a simple substitution of the Government. In an armed action in 1867 in defense of the government of Gen. José María Cabral, the first president elected by universal suffrage, he was taken to Santiago to receive medical attention and then transferred to the city of La Vega, where he died afflicted with tetanus, a result of the wound he had received. His older brother Juan Antonio continued the anti-annexationist struggle against Buenaventura Báez, leading a military rebellion in Monte Cristi in late 1873 together with Ulises Heureaux which, although suppressed, marked the beginning of the end of his six-year government.

His remains rest in the National Pantheon.

== Bibliography ==
- Cassa, Roberto. "Héroes Restauradores". Archivo General de La Nación. 2009
- García Lluberes, Alcides . «El General Gaspar Polanco». CLIO No. 93. 1952
- Bosh, Juan. "La Guerra de la Restauración". Santo Domingo. 1996
- Monción, Benito. "Relación Histórica: De Capotillo a Santiago" CLIO No. 81. 1948. Pag 33-39
- de la Gándara y Navarro, Gral. José, "Anexion y guerra de Santo Domingo" Tomo I. Imprenta El Correo Militar, Madrid. 1884
- de la Gándara y Navarro, Gral. José, "Anexion y guerra de Santo Domingo" Tomo II. Imprenta El Correo Militar, Madrid 1884
- Lopez Morillo, Adriano. "Memorias sobre la segunda reincorporación de Santo Domingo a España" Tomo I-III. Sociedad Dominicana de Bibliófilos 1983
- González Tablas, Ramon. "Historia de la dominacion y ultima guerra de España en Santo Domingo" Madrid. 1870
- Archambault, Pedro Maria. "Historia de la Restauracion". La Librairie Technique et Economique. Paris. 1938
- Rodríguez Demorizi, Emilio. Próceres de la Restauración: noticias biográficas. Editora del Caribe. 1963
- Luperon, Gregorio. Notas Autobiográficas y Apuntes Históricos. Editorial El Diario. 1939
- Rodríguez-Objio, Manuel. "Relaciones". Ciudad Trujillo. 1951

Preceded by José Antonio Salcedo	President of the Dominican Republic; 1864–1865	Succeeded by Benigno Filomeno de Rojas
