= Domingo Daniel Pichardo Pró =

Dominican politician (1809–1884)

Vice President of the Dominican Republic
- In office 1857–1858
- President: José Desiderio Valverde

Minister of the Interior, Justice and Public Instruction
- In office 1857–1858

Minister of War and Navy (acting)
- In office May 31, 1858 – 1858

Personal details
- Born: February 27, 1809 Ceuta, Spain
- Died: September 24, 1884 (aged 75) La Vega, Dominican Republic
- Party: Red Party
- Parent(s): Domingo Pichardo; Dolores Pró y Baeza
- Profession: Lawyer

Domingo Daniel Pichardo Pró (February 27, 1809 – September 24, 1884) was a Dominican politician and lawyer. A member of La Trinitaria, he took part in the Dominican War of Independence, and in 1857–1858 he was Vice President in the provisional government of José Desiderio Valverde.

== Early life ==
Pichardo was born in Ceuta on February 27, 1809, and was baptized the following day. His father, Domingo Pichardo, a native of Santiago de los Caballeros, was a lieutenant in the Cantabria Regiment, which had been posted to Ceuta after Spain ceded Santo Domingo to France in 1795; his mother, Dolores Pró y Baeza, was from Ceuta. In 1813 the family sailed from Cádiz to Puerto Rico and from there to Santo Domingo, where they settled in Santiago de los Caballeros.

== Independence ==
Pichardo belonged to La Trinitaria, the secret society founded by Juan Pablo Duarte in 1838 to end Haitian rule. When Santiago declared for separation from Haiti in 1844, he told a meeting of the town's notables and authorities that the resolve of the Dominican people alone was enough to sustain the separation. He then accompanied Pedro Ramón de Mena, the delegate of the Central Governing Board, to Puerto Plata, where he, Juan Luis Franco Bidó and Pedro Ezequiel Guerrero formed the commission that negotiated the surrender of the Haitian garrison under General Cadet Antoine. The capitulation was signed on March 14, 1844.

== Political career ==
After independence Pichardo was mayor of Santiago de los Caballeros. In 1850 he presided over the Tribunate, the legislative chamber that preceded the present Chamber of Deputies, and in 1855 he was senator for the province of Santiago.

In the provisional government of José Desiderio Valverde during the Cibaeño Revolution (1857–1858), he was Vice President and Minister of the Interior, Justice and Public Instruction, and from May 31, 1858 also acting Minister of War and Navy. When Pedro Santana returned to power on July 13, 1858, Pichardo refused to recognize his government and went into exile.

== Later life ==
Pichardo returned to the Dominican Republic around 1860 and practiced as a lawyer. He supported the annexation of the country by Spain in 1861; a royal order of October 7, 1861 authorized him to act as a public defender, and on July 28, 1862 he was made a commander of the Order of Isabella the Catholic. During the annexation he again served as mayor of Santiago.

During the Second Republic (1865–1916) he belonged to the Red Party led by Buenaventura Báez, and on December 1, 1876 he signed the manifesto that refused to recognize the government of Ignacio María González. He died in La Vega on September 24, 1884, at the age of 75, while serving as judge of the court of first instance.
