= First Dominican Republic =

Period of Dominican statehood following independence from Haiti (1844–1861)

Dominican Republic Spanish: República Dominicana
- 1844–1861
- Flag Coat of arms

- Map of Hispaniola from 1858.
- Status: Dominican territory
- Capital: Santo Domingo (1844–1857) Santiago de los Caballeros (1857–1858) Santo Domingo (1859–1861)
- Common languages: Spanish
- Demonym: Dominican
- Government: Presidential republic
- President
  - 1844–1848 (first): Pedro Santana
  - 1848–1849 (second): Manuel Jiménes
  - 1849–1853 (third): Buenaventura Báez
  - 1853–1856 (fourth): Pedro Santana
  - 1856–1856 (fifth): Manuel de Regla Mota
  - 1856–1858 (sixth): Buenaventura Báez
  - 1858–1858 (seventh): José Desiderio Valverde
  - 1858–1861 (last): Pedro Santana
- History
  - Proclamation of the Dominican Republic: 27 February 1844
  - Spanish annexation of the Dominican Republic: 18 March 1861
- Currency: Dominican peso
Preceded by	Succeeded by
Haitian occupation of Santo Domingo	Annexation of the Dominican Republic to Spain

The First Dominican Republic (Spanish: Primera República Dominicana, Primera República) was a predecessor of the currently existing Dominican Republic, which began on February 27, 1844, with the proclamation of the Dominican Republic, and ended on March 18, 1861, with the annexation of the country to Spain. During these 17 years, the nation was economically and politically unstable, due to prior war against Haiti and internal conflicts. Within its 17 years of existence, it had eight governments, three of which were led by Pedro Santana and two by Buenaventura Báez.

The era of the First Republic was a period of great importance in Dominican history, as it marked the beginning of its independent life. The independence of the Dominican Republic was proclaimed on February 27, 1844, when a group of young patriots led by Juan Pablo Duarte and other prominent Dominican leaders rebelled against Haitian rule. This proclamation marked the end of the Haitian occupation of Santo Domingo, leading to the establishment of the new nation. After this, the Dominican Republic would have to fend off against external interests from Haiti, Spain, France, Great Britain, and the United States to maintain its sovereignty.

Internally, the new nation faced a series of challenges, including the construction of a stable political system and the organization of the state structure. During this stage, the country's first Constitution was promulgated in November 1844, which established a republican and democratic system. However, for much of this time, the nation operated under the rule of conservative caudillos, who sought to refute the liberal principles that laid the foundation for the patriotic sentiment.

== History ==
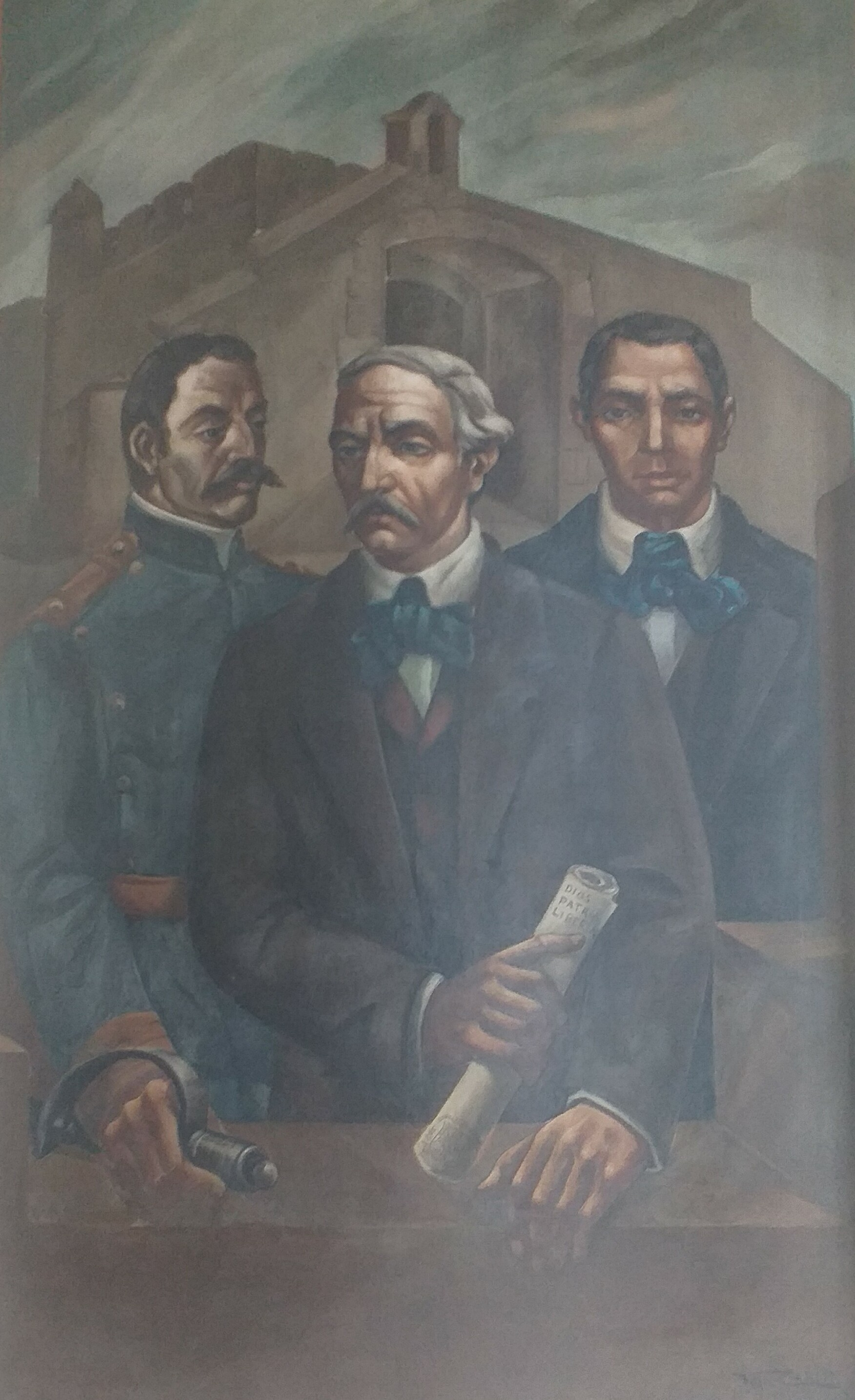
Painting of founding fathers of the Dominican Republic: Matías Ramón Mella, Juan Pablo Duarte, and Francisco del Rosario Sánchez.

On the night of February 27, 1844, the leaders of the Triniatrios met in order to plan their fight, not only to free the Dominicans from Haitian control, but to establish an independent state free from all foreign power. At dawn, the blunderbuss shot of Matías Ramón Mella rang out at the Puerta de la Misericordia, and thus, the Dominican Republic was born. That same day, the Dominican Act of Independence, which became the Constitutive Act of the Dominican State, was read at the Puerta del Conde. Simultaneously, another group of patriots led by Francisco del Rosario Sánchez, declared independence and forced the Haitian garrison in Santo Domingo, led by Desgrotte, to capitulate. As there were few detachments of Haitian troops in the area, it was initially an easy task to shake off their domination. Throughout the First Republic, the Haitians tried on numerous occasions to regain control over the Dominican part of the island, but were defeated time and again by Creole forces. The decision of the vast majority of Dominicans to be free and independent, the fact that the fight was in their own territory and that the Dominicans generally had more advantageous positions, the use of pack animals for transport and combat while the Haitians marched on foot and did not receive support of food, medicine and other supplies from their country when they were on campaign were all factors that contributed to militarily consolidating independence from Haiti.

=== Development of a new constitution ===
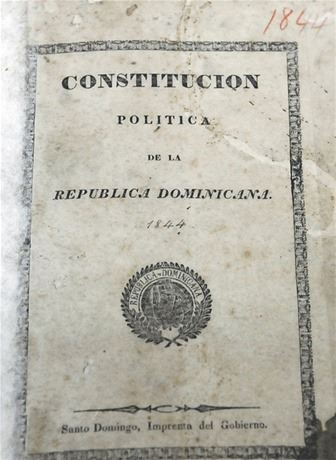
The Dominican Constitution of 1844

During this time, a new Constitution was established that laid the foundation for the country's political organization. The new Constitution was drafted and promulgated in 1844, shortly after the Dominican Republic declared its independence from Haiti. This Constitution established a republican system of government, in which the fundamental rights and freedoms of citizens were recognized.

One of the most notable aspects of this Constitution was the division of powers. Executive power was in the hands of a president, elected by popular vote, who was in charge of governing the country. Legislative power fell to a bicameral Congress, composed of a Chamber of Deputies and a Senate, in charge of making laws. Judicial power rested with a Supreme Court of Justice, in charge of guaranteeing impartiality and justice in the legal system.

In addition to the division of powers, the Constitution of the First Republic also established the separation of Church and State. This meant that the State could not intervene in religious affairs and that every citizen was free to profess the religion of his or her choice.

=== Conflicts and political struggles ===
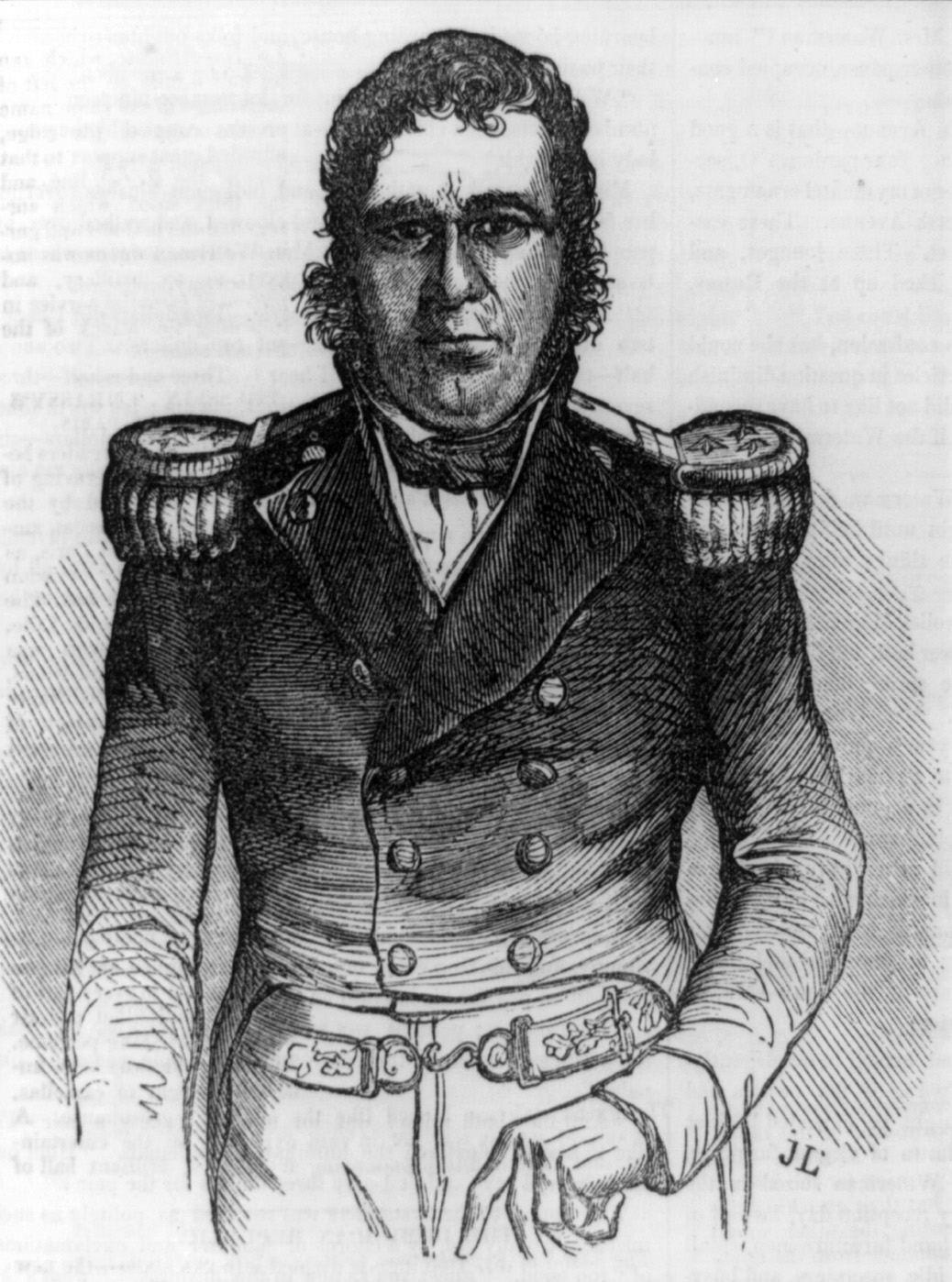
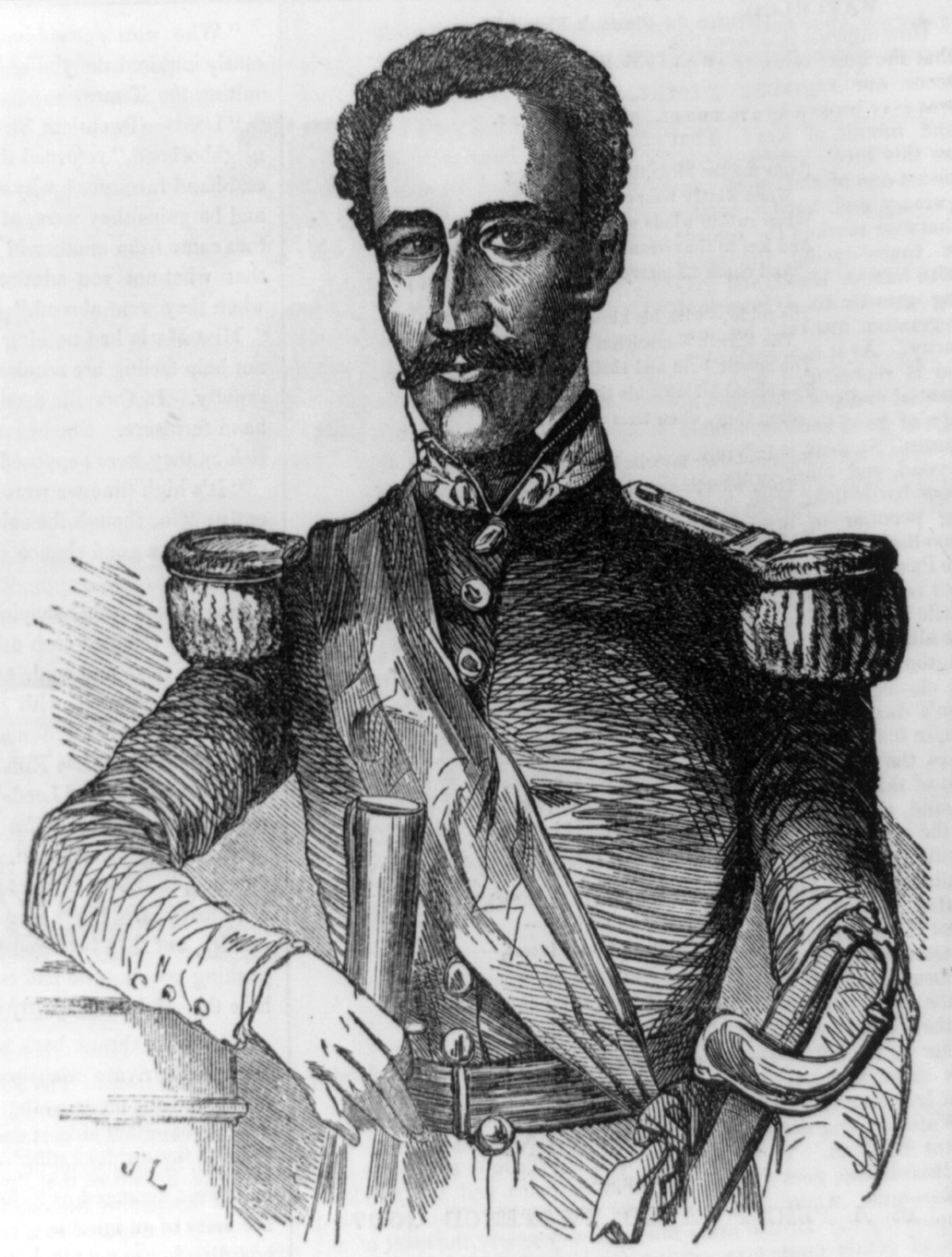
Within the 17 years of the First Republic, the influence of liberal that led to the establishment of the Dominican Republic would lose prominence, and conservative politics took the reins of the government. The two most prolific politicians to emerge from this period was Pedro Santana (left) and Buenaventura Báez (right).

After its formation, the First Dominican Republic faced a series of internal conflicts and political struggles. One of the main conflicts was the struggle between conservatives and liberals, who had divergent political and economic visions. After the declaration of independence, political power passed to the conservative group of hateros and Frenchified bureaucrats. Through majority control, the presidency of the Central Government Board was in the hands of Tomás Bobadilla, and the Liberation Army was controlled by General Pedro Santana and his Seiban lancers. Although they were the ones who had experience in managing men for the upcoming war, they were also bourgeoisie allies of foreign importers and exporters who supported the annexation of the country to the highest power. After a failed attempt by the petty bourgeoisie to regain power under the leadership of Juan Pablo Duarte, who represented the strongest component opposed to the imposition of foreign rule, the hatero sector led by Santana, leader of the east of the country, expelled the Trinitarios and established a military dictatorship, which was only disputed by his former protégé, Buenaventura Báez, a rancher-logger and merchant from the South, who was more educated, a better administrator, more cunning and honest than Santana.

As the Dominican War of Independence raged on through the 1840s and 1850s, both politicians extended their influence over the entire nation. One of the key moments of this period was the government of Pedro Santana. Santana was a Dominican military man and politician who played a fundamental role in the country's independence. However, his government was marked by corruption and political repression. During his term, Santana adopted authoritarian and centralist measures, which led to discontent among various sectors of Dominican society. In addition, his economic policy favored large landowners and harmed small farmers and workers. These unpopular measures and the lack of legitimacy of Santana's government contributed to the worsening of the political crisis in the First Dominican Republic.

However, other administrations proved to be just as disastrous. In 1857, the tobacco farmers and retail merchants of Cibao and Santiago, who had continued to grow economically without achieving greater influence in the government, rose up against the Báez government under the leadership of José Desiderio Valverde, accusing him of speculating against them with tobacco and hard currency. The revolutionaries displaced the Baecistas around Santo Domingo, proclaimed the Constitution of Moca, and moved the capital to Santiago, but also accepted the return of Santana and put him in command of the besieging troops. After finally triumphing against Báez, Santana also turned against the Cibaeño liberals, reestablished his control over the country and ending the Cibaeño Revolution. He would soon take advantage of international conditions, the American Civil War, and the new rise of European colonialism, to propagate a new annexation project. This became the prelude for the annexation to Spain in 1861.

=== Border conflicts with Haiti ===
The border conflict with Haiti was one of the main challenges faced by the First Dominican Republic. After its independence in 1844, the Dominican Republic had to deal with territorial disputes and tensions with its Haiti. The border between the two countries was not clearly defined and this led to constant conflicts and territorial disputes. Haiti claimed the entire island of Hispaniola, while the Dominican Republic defended its independence and sovereignty over its territory.

These border tensions led to several armed clashes between the two countries. The Dominican Republic had to defend itself and protect its borders from Haitian incursions and attacks. To resolve the conflict, various negotiations and diplomatic agreements were held, but none achieved a lasting solution. Territorial disputes continued throughout the existence of the First Dominican Republic. This border conflict with Haiti had a significant impact on the political and economic stability of the country during that period. The Dominican Republic had to allocate resources and efforts to defend its territory, which affected its development and growth as a nation.

Despite diplomatic and military efforts, the border conflict with Haiti was not resolved during the First Dominican Republic. It was not until years later, in the 20th century, that clear boundaries were established between the two countries.

== Economy ==
The First Republic was a period characterized by relative economic stability in the country. During this time, the Dominican economy was based primarily on agriculture, especially the production of sugar, coffee, and tobacco. These products were exported to other countries, which generated income for the development and growth of the country. Sugar production was especially important during this period, as the Dominican Republic became one of the main sugar producers in the Caribbean. This attracted foreign investments and contributed to the country's economic growth.

In addition to agriculture, other economic activities were also developed, such as mining and trade. Deposits of gold and silver were discovered in some regions of the country, which attracted miners and businessmen interested in exploiting these resources. Trade also benefited, as trade relations were established with other countries in the region and ports were built to facilitate the exchange of goods.

== Presidents ==
Presidents of the First Republic
Santana	Jimenes	Santana	Báez	Santana	Regla Mota	Báez	Desiderio Valverde
1844	1848	May 1849	September 1849	1853	1855	1856	1857
Santana
1858-1861

== See also ==
- History of the Dominican Republic
- Second Dominican Republic
- Third Dominican Republic
- Juan Pablo Duarte
- Vice Presidents of the Dominican Republic (1844–1861)
