= Cibao =

Region of the Dominican Republic

Coordinates: 19.6269°N 70.2774°W

Cibao Region Región del Cibao (Spanish)
- Cultural Region
- Cibao Macroregion; Macrorregión del Cibao (Spanish)
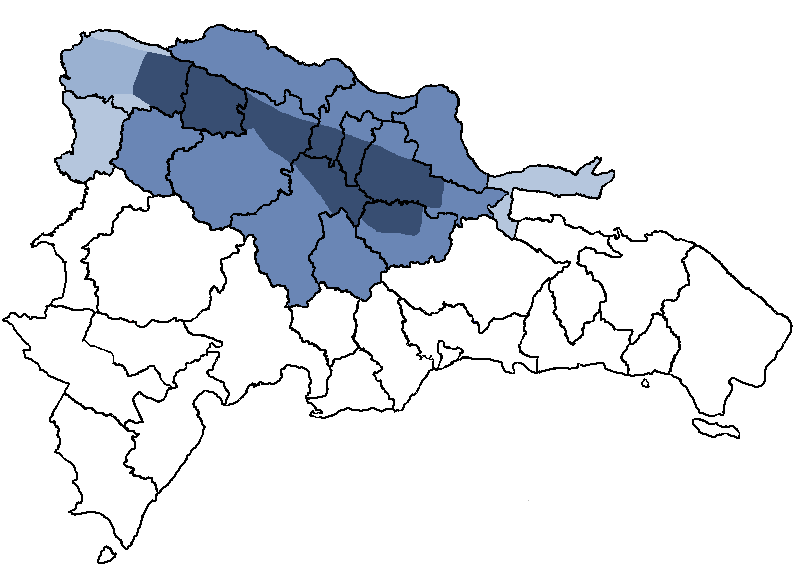
- Sovereign state: Dominican Republic
- Subdivision of the Spanish Empire: 1492
- Department of French First Republic: 1795
- Province of Spain: 1811
- Republic of Spanish Haiti: 1822
- Haitian occupation of Santo Domingo: 1844
- Department of the First Dominican Republic: 1844
- De-facto Cibao State: 1857
- Capital: Santiago de los Caballeros
- Official languages: Spanish
- Ethnic groups (2023): 50% Mestizos; 30% White Dominicans; 15% Mulatos; 5% Asian & Other
- Religion (2023): 85% Catholic; 8% Protestant; 7% Other
- Demonym(s): Cibaeño/a

Government
  - President: Luis Abinader
- Legislature: Congress

Area
  - Total: 19,058.62 km^{2} (7,358.57 sq mi)
  - Water (%): negligible

Population
  - 2023 census: 3,450,875
  - Density: 180/km^{2} (466.2/sq mi) (2)
- GDP (nominal): 2024 estimate
  - Total: $60.995 billion
  - Per capita: $17.675
- HDI (2022): 0.835 very high
- Currency: Dominican peso (DOP)
- Time zone: UTC-4 (UTC)
  - Summer (DST): not observed
- Calling code: +1

The Cibao (Spanish pronunciation: [siˈβa.o] sib-OW), usually referred as El Cibao, is a cultural and administrative region of the Dominican Republic located in the northern part of the country. As of 2017, the Cibao region has a population of 3,450,875 million, making it the second most populous region in the country.

The region has its own cultural identity, it forms a "macroregion of development"; with a large industrial base and high levels of progress among its inhabitants, it has high levels of education and the highest quality of life among the three main regions of the Dominican Republic. The Cibao is characterized socioculturally by the overwhelming predominance of the European legacy, (predominantly Spanish and French) and economically by being the most prosperous region of the country.

== Etymology ==
The word Cibao, from Taino Ciba-o 'stone mountain'; from Taino ciba 'rock, stone' and o 'mountain'. Cibao was an Indigenous name for the island, although the Spanish used it during the Spanish conquest to refer to the rich and fertile valley between the Central and Septentrional mountain ranges.

== Geography and economy ==
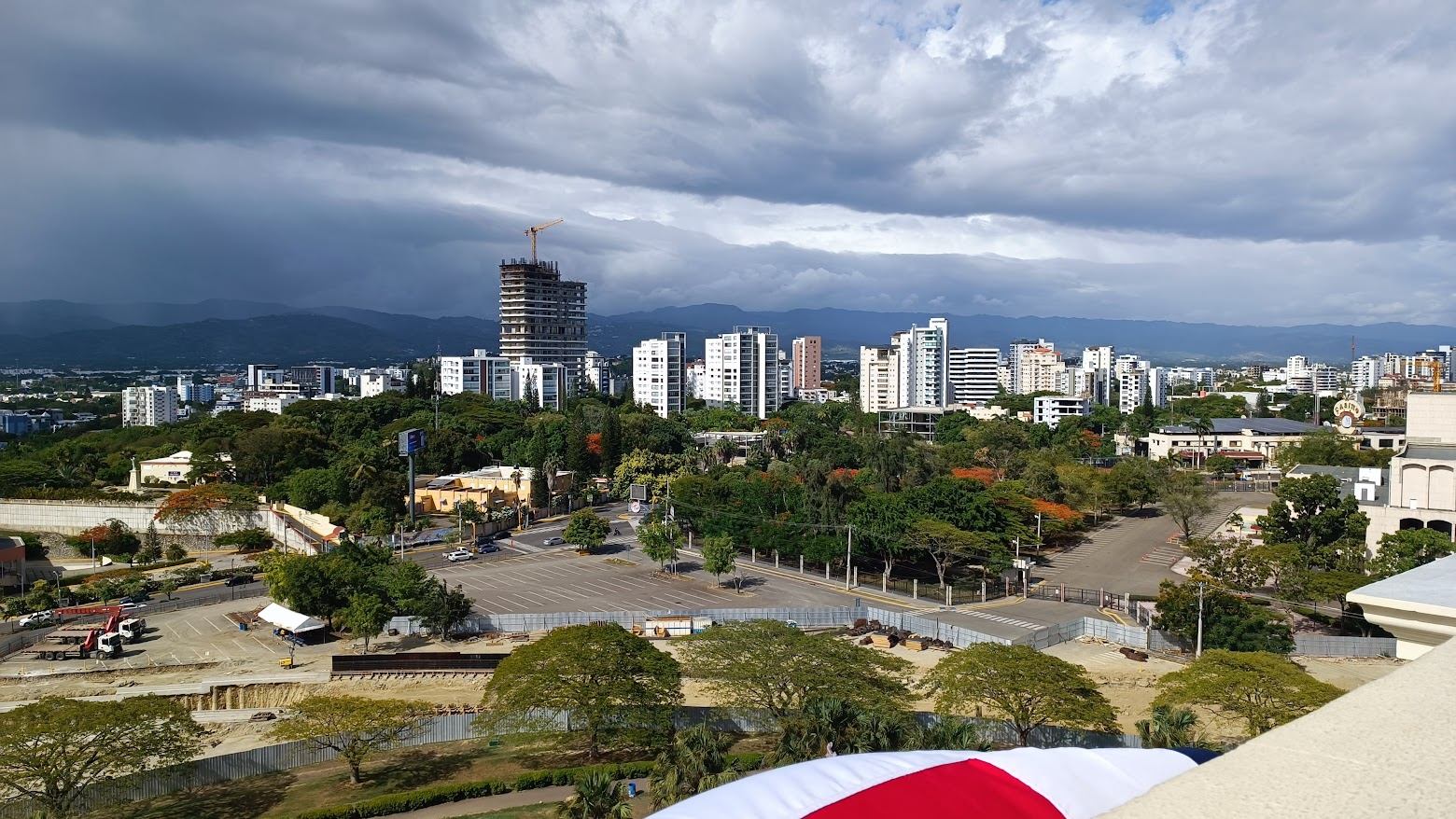
Santiago de los Caballeros is the economic center of the Cibao region.

El Cibao occupies the central and northern part of the Dominican territory. To the north and east of the region lies the Atlantic Ocean; to its west lies the Republic of Haiti and to the south the Central Range, which separates El Cibao from the other natural regions.

The Cordillera Central mountain range is located within El Cibao, containing the highest peak in all of the Caribbean, Pico Duarte. Two of the largest rivers of the country are also located inside this region: the Yaque del Norte, the largest river of the Dominican Republic, and the Yuna river. Both of these rivers contain several chains of dams used to provide the region with water for irrigation (since agriculture is the main activity of the area) and hydroelectric energy. Rice, coffee and cacao are the most important crops grown in the area.

The central mountain range also has important mining activity. Its main mineral resources include gold, iron and nickel, among others. The largest gold mine in the Americas and second largest in the world, the Pueblo Viejo mine, is located in the Cibao region. The internationally known Barrick Gold and Falconbridge are the companies in charge of the extraction of these ores.

== Culture ==
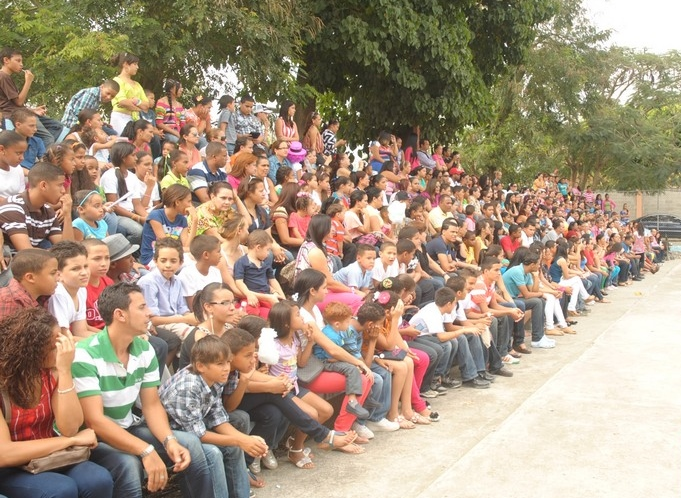
Cibaenians in the town of Moca, Espaillat.

The valley is not only a geographical unit, but also a cultural and linguistic unit. The Cibao region is considered to be the cultural heartland of the Dominican Republic. The typical accent spoken in the Cibao region is a mixture of two dialects: that of the 16th- and 17th-century Portuguese colonists in the Cibao valley, and of the 18th-century Canarian settlers.

Merengue music, played using the güira, tambora and accordion, was originated in El Cibao. The original folk type of merengue is known as perico ripiao or típico, which is played to this day by local musical groups, as a variation of the merengue, with a faster pace.

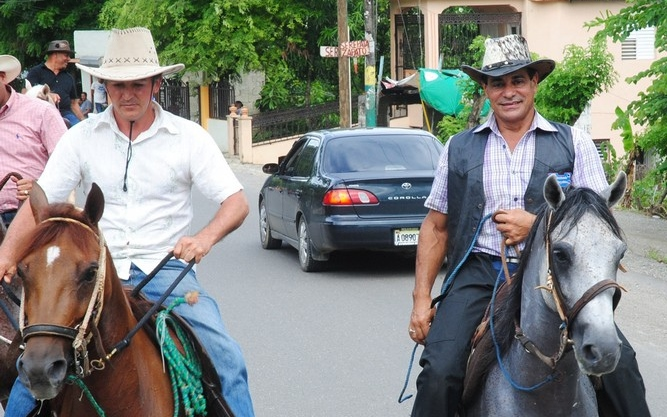
Horse riding culture in El Cibao.

During Late January and through February, several carnivals are held within the region. The most popular of these festivals belongs to the province of La Vega, and dates back to the first European settlements. It began as a religious activity celebrating the pre-Lent season, and the carnival's theme revolves around the victory of good over evil.

Many important Dominican patriots were of Cibaenian origin. Among the most important are local generals José Desiderio Valverde and José Antonio Salcedo, who were responsible for the restoration of the Republic in the later decades of the 1800s. During the Trujillo dictatorship, the Mirabal sisters arranged clandestine organizations to rebel against the fascist dictatorship. The sisters were brutally murdered in 1960, and remain today as some of the biggest martyrs on behalf of the Dominican nation.

The bulk of the population is mainly concentrated in the center of the region. The city of Santiago de los Caballeros constitutes the regional center and main focus of development of the area.

== Provinces ==
Province	Capital	Area (km^{2})	Population	Density	Map region
Dajabón	Dajabón	1,020.73	62,046	61	4
Duarte	San Francisco de Macorís	1,605.35	483,805	301	5
Espaillat	Moca	838.62	425,091	507	8
Hermanas Mirabal	Salcedo	440.43	196,356	445	21
La Vega	Concepción de la Vega	2,287.24	585,101	556	13
María Trinidad Sánchez	Nagua	1,271.71	135,727	119	14
Monseñor Nouel	Bonao	992.39	367,618	370	15
Monte Cristi	San Fernando de Monte Cristi	1,924.35	111,014	58	16
Puerto Plata	San Felipe de Puerto Plata	1,852.90	312,706	168	20
Samaná	Santa Bárbara de Samaná	853.74	91,875	108	22
Sánchez Ramírez	Cotuí	1,196.13	151,179	126	23
Santiago	Santiago de los Caballeros	2,836.51	1,543,362	320	28
Santiago Rodríguez	San Ignacio de Sabaneta	1,111.14	259,629	234	29
Valverde	Santa Cruz de Mao	823.38	258,293	314	31
Total		19,058.62	5,246,690	165	-
