= 1843 Constitution of Haiti =

The 1843 Constitution of Haiti was enacted on December 30, 1843, during the administration of Charles Rivière-Hérard.

It was the sixth constitution of twenty-two that have been ratified since the Haitian Revolution ended in 1804. This constitution was in place for less than three years, and the constitution it had replaced, the Haitian constitution of 1816, was once again reinstated. Although many of the changes that the Constitution of 1843 attempted to implement did not prevail past the limited life of the document itself, this constitution laid the groundwork for future protections of civil liberties and checks and balances within Haiti.

== Background ==
On October 17, 1806, Emperor Jacques I of Haiti was assassinated. This led to a subsequent split and unofficial partition of the First Empire of Haiti into the Republic of Haiti in the south and the State of Haiti to the north.

The first Republic of Haiti was established with the Constitution of 1806, with Alexandre Pétion serving as the president. In 1816, Pétion revised the Constitution of 1806 and greatly expanded his own power as President of the Republic of Haiti. Among the changes were Pétion declaring himself President for life, weakening the powers of the legislature, and eventually suspending the legislature altogether before his death in 1818. After his death, he named one of his generals, Jean-Pierre Boyer, as the next President of the Republic of Haiti.

The State of Haiti was led by President Henri Christophe under the new Constitution of 1807. Like the Republic of Haiti's 1816 revision, the Constitution of 1807 named Christophe President for life and limited certain other freedoms. The legislature could only view and work on legislation that the President had introduced, and the public practice of any religion other than Catholicism was banned. This Constitution stood until Christophe constructed the 1811 Constitution of Haiti, declaring himself as the King of Haiti and establishing a hereditary monarchy. Christophe would reign until 1820 when he died of suicide. After his death, Boyer reunited the north and south under one government, and the monarchy Christophe established did not continue.

After reuniting the country, Boyer would continue to rule under the 1816 revisions to the Constitution of 1806. The most infamous legacy of Boyer's presidency is the 1825 indemnity payment that he agreed Haiti would pay to France for diplomatic recognition of its independence as a nation. The debt that Boyer agreed to pay back to France was 150 million francs within five years, which effectively crippled the Haitian economy to this day. Boyer's presidency continued until 1843 but was hamstrung by serious economic hardships from the fallout of the indemnity payments. Boyer attempted galvanize the Haitian economy to help pay down the debt by setting quotas on production for rural farmers and tying farmers to their land, often denying them the opportunities to leave their farm and enter cities or set up alternative shops or businesses. Not only did this semi-feudal measure prove to be ineffective in making a dent in the indemnity payment, it also further heightened the discontent amongst the largely rural Haitian population who had no say in agreeing to the indemnity payment or electing the leader who did. Due to the Pétion-era presidency rules established in the Constitution of 1806, the largely rural populous of Haiti who had been hit hard by the nation's financial hardships were unable to democratically vote out the president of the republic. This reality led to many calls for a forceable change in leadership, which came to fruition on February 13, 1843 under the direction of Charles Rivière-Hérard, who was named the next President of Haiti shortly after.

The presidency of Hérard began with a new constitution, the Constitution of 1843, in which the President's power was severely limited relative to the previous 1816 revisions to the Constitution of 1806. These changes were supposedly proposed and ratified by the Haitian parliament without the support or knowledge of Hérard. Despite these constitutional changes that enhanced the power of the Haitian people, there was still a high level of discontent with Hérard's government. An armed revolt broke out in early 1844, and by May 3 of that year, Hérard was replaced by the aging general Philippe Guerrier. Guerrier's presidency lasted less than a year, as did the term of his replacement, Jean-Louis Pierrot. Pierrot's successor was Jean-Baptiste Riché, who was himself a former supporter of Jean-Pierre Boyer. After taking office in March 1846, one of Riché’s first actions was to reinstate the Constitution of 1816 from the Presidency of Alexandre Pétion. This marked the end of the governing done under the Constitution of 1843.

There were five Haitian Constitutions that were used to rule over either what was considered Haiti as a whole, or subdivisions of the nation that declared themselves to be the true government of Haiti during a period of infighting and strife prior to the Constitution of 1843. Vestiges of each constitution remain until the Constitution of 1843 and some even well beyond that, while others are reversed entirely by its enactment.

=== Constitution of 1805 ===
As the first constitution used to govern the newly-free nation of Haiti, the Constitution of 1805, paved the way for many of the subsequent constitutions and shaped many of the things that they sought to continue and change. The first two actions taken in the constitution are declaring Haiti a free nation and abolishing the practice of slavery in Haiti forever. Although the Empire of Haiti would briefly split, Haiti remains independent from foreign colonialism today, and the abolition of slavery has likewise continued. The government laid out in this constitution was run by a single Emperor, who had unchecked power over governmental and military decisions.

=== Constitution of 1806 ===
The Constitution of 1806, largely written by President Alexandre Pétion, was the establishing document of the Republic of Haiti. Specifically, the Constitution continued with the abolition of slavery, set limits on the judicial and legislative branches, and outlined the executive branch as the most powerful of the branches.

=== 1816 Revisions to the Constitution of 1806 ===
Also during the presidency of Alexandre Pétion, the 1816 revisions did more than just establishing him as President for life. It allowed for a significant increase in executive power, while also making certain concessions to the people that the Constitution of 1806 previously lacked. A bicameral legislature was established, and given purview over taxation, but little more. All laws were While members of the common populous were allowed to pick their representatives in the legislature, they had to due so from a list of nominees hand-picked by President Pétion. It also gave the President the purview to name his successor, with only the legislature having the power to reject it and chose a different name. This process severely limits the role of the people in choosing their leader, as the members of the legislature themselves must be nominated by the president and not by the public themselves.

=== Constitution of 1807 ===
Beyond establishing Christophe as President for life, the founding constitution of the State of Haiti was notable for leaving out certain sections that had been cornerstones of previous post-revolution Haitian constitutions. While slavery was abolished, there was no ban on white ownership of land, the practice of religions other than Catholicism was outlawed in public, and the constitutional rights afforded to Haitians were suspended any time that the army is dispatched. The constitution also gives President Christophe the absolute right to command the army, meaning that he could effectively suspend constitutional rights without any checks or balances.

=== Constitution of 1811 ===
The Constitution of 1811 served as a broad expansion of power for Henri Christophe and his rule following the Constitution of 1807 that had previously ruled the State of Haiti. In the constitution, Christophe was named King of Haiti and a royal bloodline was established. All clergy and other government officials had to take an oath of fidelity to the king. Many of the contentious parts of the Constitution of 1807, such as allowing white ownership of land and the suspension of the constitution on army grounds, were not addressed or resolved by this constitution.

=== Specific Provisions of the Constitution of 1843 ===
The Constitution of 1843 tackled a broad range of issues dealing with the powers and limitations of the executive, the military, and personal freedoms. However, there were still shortcomings that were not rectified by this constitution.

The constitution contained many important innovations. The judges were to be elected by the people, instead of being appointed by the President. Aside from previously selecting which of the presidentially nominated legislators to elect, this represents the first time that the Haitian public had a significant role in choosing members of the government. This policy was particularly important because all offenses, either criminal, political, or by the press, were to be submitted to trials by jury. This was a significant step towards allowing political participation from the lower classes of Haitian society. Presidency for life was abolished following the Boyer presidency, and the term of the Chief of the Executive Power was limited to four years. Additionally, no measure could be adopted by the President without the countersign of the proper Minister, while the right to introduce laws was conferred on the House of Representatives and on the Senate as well as on the President. This shift marked the most expansive system of checks and balances in the over forty years of Haitian independence, and was not matched again for many years after the Constitution of 1843 was replaced. Other notable changes from previous constitutions included: matters concerning the communes and the arrondissements were in charge of the municipalities and the arrondissement councils. An estimate of the revenues and expenses was to be voted annually; a Court of Accounts was instituted. The Army was declared a law-abiding body and strict measures were enacted in view of guaranteeing personal freedom and respect of property.

Although the Constitution of 1843 is not a particularly well-known or significantly regarded document even in modern Haitian history, its legacy as a document that aimed to protect civil liberties and limit the powers of an absolute ruler relative to its time and context survives to this day. While the reforms that were made reflect the progressive nature of this document for its time, its subsequent removal shortly after provides a reminder of the divided nature of Haiti during this time period.

=== Comparison to the Constitution of the United States ===
Important facets of the Constitution of 1843 mirror some of those outlined in the Constitution of the United States, which was ratified in 1788. Primarily, both constitutions aim to consolidate and organize power following a revolution. In the case of Haiti, this constitution aims to address power vacuums left by the Haitian Revolution ending in 1804 as well as the revolution in 1843 that removed Jean-Pierre Boyer from power. Both of these constitutions therefore aim to provide non-violent methods for the public to choose alternative leadership if they are unsatisfied rather than the potential for violent revolution and potential civil war. It is also notable that both constitutions provide clear limitations on the terms of the presidency and how much power one person can hold. For example, both constitutions lay out four-year terms for presidencies so that no one ruler is in power too long without being reelected. The American Constitution provides a system of checks and balances in which all three of the legislative, executive, and judicial branches can override the other and be overruled by others. In the Haitian Constitution of 1843, the President could not enact any legislation without the countersign of the Proper Minister of the Haitian legislature.

Another similarity between the two constitutions is the inclusion of provisions that protect the freedom of individual rights. The most notable protection granted in the American Constitution is the Bill of Rights, headlined by the first amendment. The United States guaranteeing these civil liberties in writing was one of the earliest implementations the protection of individual rights from the state, and Haiti became another nation that attempted to codify these rights. One example that can be seen in the constitution was that every person in Haiti was given the right to trial by jury for any crime that had been accused of being committed, and the military was reverted to a law-abiding body instead of having the ability to suspend the constitution. This progress towards due process is a notable change that not only helped to ensure justice and fairness for those accused of crimes, but also further legitimized the judicial system in a place that had long been ruled in an autocratic manner.
