= Cabral, Dominican Republic =

Cabral
- Location within the Dominican Republic
- Coordinates: 18°15′N 71°13′W
- Country: Dominican Republic
- Province: Barahona

Area
  - Total: 149.3 km^{2} (57.6 sq mi)

Population (2012)
  - Total: 14,523
  - Density: 97.27/km^{2} (251.9/sq mi)
- Climate: Aw

Cabral is a town in the Barahona province of the Dominican Republic.

== Climate ==
Climate data for Cabral, Dominican Republic (1961–1990)
Month	Jan	Feb	Mar	Apr	May	Jun	Jul	Aug	Sep	Oct	Nov	Dec	Year
Record high °C (°F)	36.8 (98.2)	35.2 (95.4)	37.0 (98.6)	37.2 (99.0)	36.7 (98.1)	39.8 (103.6)	37.0 (98.6)	39.7 (103.5)	38.3 (100.9)	38.0 (100.4)	37.0 (98.6)	35.5 (95.9)	39.8 (103.6)
Mean daily maximum °C (°F)	31.3 (88.3)	31.7 (89.1)	32.6 (90.7)	33.3 (91.9)	33.0 (91.4)	32.8 (91.0)	33.4 (92.1)	33.8 (92.8)	33.7 (92.7)	33.2 (91.8)	32.6 (90.7)	31.7 (89.1)	32.8 (91.0)
Mean daily minimum °C (°F)	18.9 (66.0)	19.4 (66.9)	20.1 (68.2)	21.2 (70.2)	21.2 (70.2)	21.4 (70.5)	21.5 (70.7)	21.9 (71.4)	21.6 (70.9)	21.1 (70.0)	20.3 (68.5)	19.2 (66.6)	20.7 (69.3)
Record low °C (°F)	13.0 (55.4)	10.1 (50.2)	13.8 (56.8)	15.8 (60.4)	14.0 (57.2)	14.0 (57.2)	16.0 (60.8)	14.0 (57.2)	17.0 (62.6)	15.3 (59.5)	14.1 (57.4)	13.0 (55.4)	10.1 (50.2)
Average rainfall mm (inches)	14.1 (0.56)	20.4 (0.80)	22.9 (0.90)	29.5 (1.16)	134.8 (5.31)	126.6 (4.98)	37.9 (1.49)	100.8 (3.97)	84.0 (3.31)	122.7 (4.83)	53.8 (2.12)	25.5 (1.00)	773.0 (30.43)
Average rainy days (≥ 1.0 mm)	2.3	3.0	3.0	3.6	9.1	8.7	4.0	5.9	7.3	9.2	3.6	2.1	61.8
Source: NOAA

== Sources ==
- World Gazeteer: Dominican Republic – World-Gazetteer.com
