= Cibaeño Revolution =

1857–1858 armed conflict in the Dominican Republic

Date	July 7, 1857 – June 21, 1858
Location	Cibao, Dominican Republic
Result	Liberal victory: Baez resigns from office; Santana regains the presidency

Belligerents
Liberal revolutionaries	Dominican Government

Commanders and leaders
José Desiderio Valverde; Benigno Filomeno de Rojas; Matías Ramón Mella	Buenaventura Báez; Francisco del Rosario Sánchez; José María Cabral

The Cibaeño Revolution (Spanish: La Revolución Cibaeño) was an armed uprising that occurred in the Dominican Republic between July 1857 and June 1858, centered in the Cibao region. It was led by liberal sectors and merchants opposed to the dictatorial regime of President Buenaventura Báez, who had centralized political and economic power in the capital, Santo Domingo. The revolution culminated in the establishment of a provisional government in Santiago and later with the fall of Báez.

The insurgent movement was notable for its defense of democratic and federal principles, while promoting a redistribution of political power among the country's different regions. It had the support of important civilian and military figures from the Cibao, including José Desiderio Valverde and Benigno Filomeno de Rojas, who played fundamental roles in the organization and leadership of the insurrection.

The Cibaeño Revolution represented one of the first significant demonstrations of opposition to centralism in Dominican political history. Although short-lived, its impact was decisive in the evolution of the national political system, as it led to the fall of an authoritarian regime and set a precedent for future regional conflicts and debates over the structure of the Dominican Republic.
