= José Antonio Salcedo =

9th President of the Dominican Republic (1863–1864)

- Photograph of José Antonio Salcedo y Ramírez, c. 1860s.

9th President of the Dominican Republic
- In office September 14, 1863 – October 10, 1864
- Vice President: Matías Ramón Mella
- Preceded by: Pedro Santana
- Succeeded by: Gaspar Polanco

Personal details
- Born: 1816 Madrid, Spain
- Died: November 5, 1864 (aged 48) Monte Cristi, Dominican Republic

Military service
- Allegiance: Dominican Republic
- Branch/service: Dominican Army: Liberation Army; Restoration Army
- Years of service: 1844–1864
- Rank: General
- Battles/wars: Dominican War of Independence; Dominican Restoration War

General José Antonio Salcedo y Ramírez, known as "Pepillo" (1816 – November 5, 1864) was Dominican military leader who played a fundamental role in the Dominican Restoration War, which achieved the independence from Spain in 1865. A martyr, he was the first Dominican head of state to be assassinated in the history of the Dominican Republic.

== Early life ==
Salcedo was born in Madrid, Spain from Criollo (white creole) parents of Spanish heritage who had been stationed in Spain for over a year, as part of the traditional Grand Tour of rich Latin American Criollos to Spain.

The names of his parents were José María Salcedo and Luisa Ramírez y Marichal, both Cuban-born Dominicans (many Dominicans fled the island due to the Napoleonic Wars, the Haitian Revolution and the political instability from 1795 to 1809: about 4,000 went to Cuba and 100,000 did so to Venezuela while scores exiled in Puerto Rico and Mexico; many Dominicans and their foreign-born children eventually returned to the island).

Leaving Spain, the family returned to Cuba when Salcedo was a year old before settling in the lands of their ancestors in the Cibao valley. He grew up near the border of Haiti where he managed large tracts of land, herds of livestock, and a rich timber business in the towns of Hatillo Palma, Estero Balsa, and Botoncillo in the northwest.

In 1844, when the First Dominican Republic was proclaimed, he joined the ranks of the Dominican Army and participated in the bloody battles of the Dominican War of Independence. He was said to have taken part In the Battle of Beler, in 1845, and the Battle of Sabana Larga, in 1856. He attained the rank of colonel for his services.

== Dominican Restoration War ==
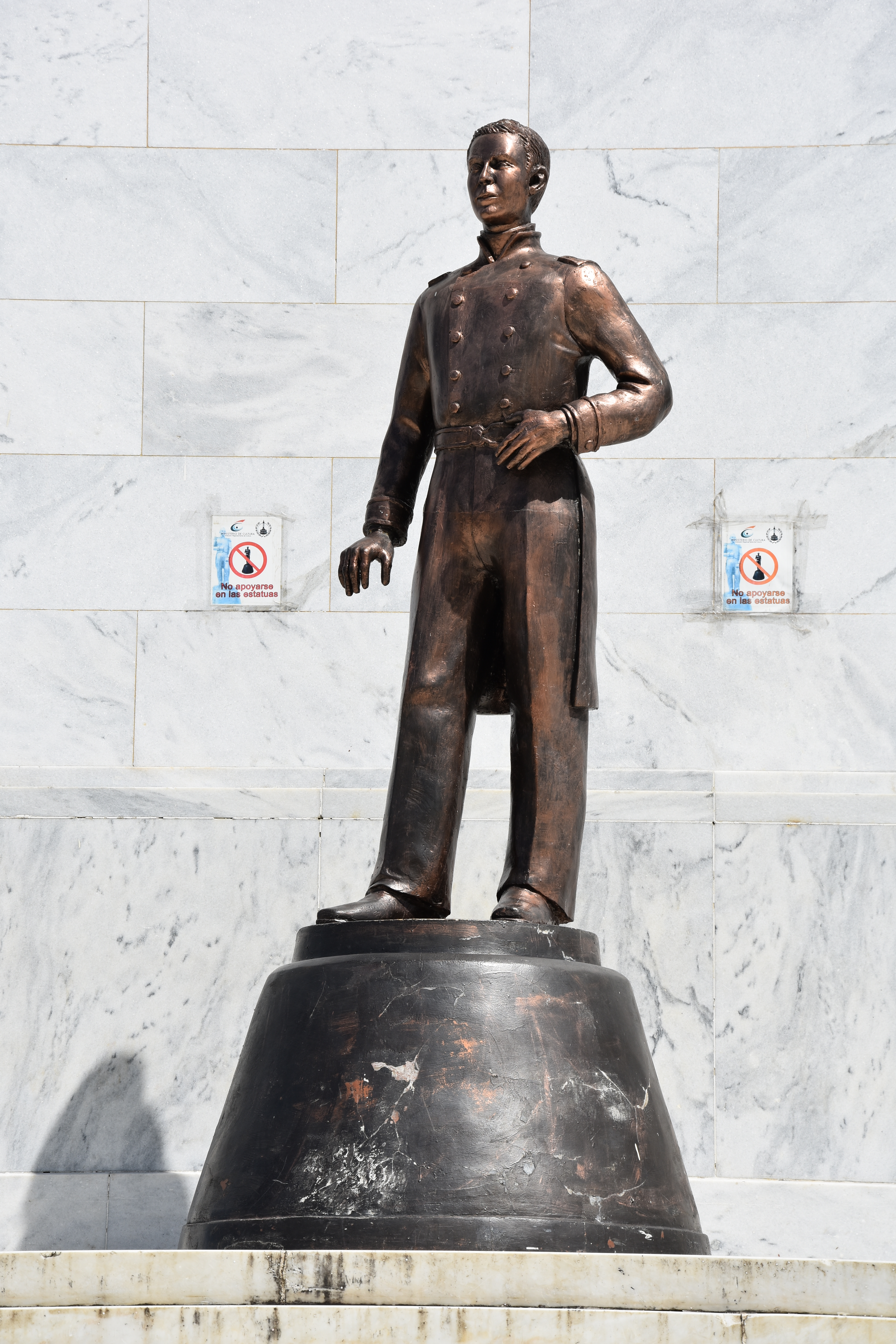
Statue of José Antonio Salcedo in Santiago de los Caballeros, Dominican Republic.

Salcedo led a civil war which aimed at the restoration of the Dominican Republic, which Spain had reoccupied in 1861. The Dominican Restoration War began on August 16, 1863, and by September 14, 1863 a Provisional Government was established, over which the general presided.

After he became the 1st head of state of the Dominican Republic, the general was opposed by the Nationalist movement, who viewed his policies as favoring those supporting the annexation of the country.

== Assassination ==
On October 15, 1864, Head of State Salcedo sent word to his wife (who lived in Guayubín) about the opposition, with a young soldier who was nearly in his mid-twenties named Ulises Heureaux. Later on the same day, he was assassinated by Coronel Agustín Masagó by order of General Gaspar Polanco.

== Personal life ==
Salcedo married Águeda Rodríguez of Guayubín, Monte Cristi. Together they had at least four children: José Tomás (born 1841 and married Rosa Elvira Brea in 1869), Antonia (born 1846), Cristina (born 1851), and Julia (married Rosendo Batista in 1888) Salcedo y Rodríguez. Antonia Salcedo married and had a daughter with another Restoration figure, Dionisio Troncoso (1834–1891), named Antonia María Troncoso y Salcedo. A great granddaughter of Pepillo, Genoveva Cruz, was 95 in 2017.

== Honors ==
The town of Pepillo Salcedo, in Monte Cristi province, was named in his honor.

== See also ==
- List of presidents of the Dominican Republic
- Gaspar Polanco
- Gregorio Luperón
- Dominican Restoration War

Political offices
Preceded by None/Spanish annexation	Head of State of the Dominican Republic; 14 September 1863 – 10 October 1864	Succeeded by Gaspar Polanco
