= José Desiderio Valverde =

7th President of the Dominican Republic (1858–1858)

José Desiderio Valverde Pérez
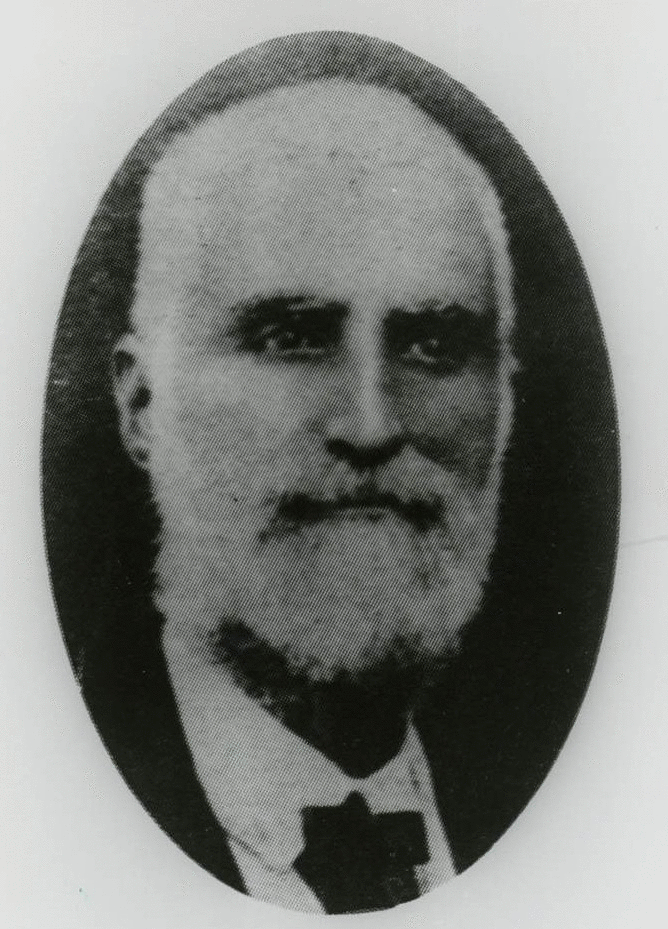

7th President of the Dominican Republic
- In office June 13, 1858 – August 31, 1858
- Vice President: Benigno Filomeno de Rojas
- Preceded by: Buenaventura Báez
- Succeeded by: Pedro Santana

Personal details
- Born: 1822 Saint-Yague, Cibao, Island of Haiti
- Died: December 22, 1903 (aged 81) Santiago de los Caballeros, Santiago, Cibao, Dominican Republic
- Relations: Ana Valverde (aunt); Antonio Sánchez-Valverde (first cousin-twice removed); Buenaventura Báez (third cousin)

José Desiderio Valverde Pérez (1822 – December 22, 1903) was a Dominican military figure and politician. He was one of the initiators of the Cibaeño Revolution, during which he served as the 7th President of the Dominican Republic from June 13, 1858 until August 31, 1858.

== Early years ==
He was born in Santiago in 1822. Son of José María Valverde Fernández, descendant of the Counts of Oropesa belonging to the Spanish nobility, and Ana María Teresa Pérez, a family dedicated to medium commerce.

== Political and military career ==
He entered the military in 1844, as a prominent leader of the Dominican War of Independence. He led the Battle of Santiago, in which Haitian forces were defeated in their attempt to penetrate through the valley of Cibao to occupy the country. Valverde, alongside Matías Ramón Mella, participanted in the task of organizing the defense of the Cibao region, after the independence movement, organizing the troops of San José de las Matas. When the militia was organized he was assigned the rank of Captain. In 1845 he was Tribunate representing the city of Santiago. In the Battle of Sabana Larga in 1856, he distinguished himself and thanks to his military skills, victory was achieved. He was promoted to General. He was Provincial Governor of Santiago.

He married Ana Rosa Mallol, in the city of Santiago, on February 26, 1848. This marriage produced seven children: Ana Rita, José Cipriano, José Emilio, Manuel Desiderio, Julia Ercilla, José Desiderio and José Desiderio Rafael Valverde Mallol.

In 1850, he was among many politicians to sign the treaty with Great Britain, which meant the recognition of Dominican independence by an international power.

He led the bourgeois revolt in Santiago against the merchants, a movement that essentially also disputed the economic measures decreed by the country's president, Buenaventura Báez. He directed the provisional government established in Santiago on July 7, 1857, triggering the Cibaeño Revolution. Once Báez was overthrown from the presidency of the State, Valverde was elected president by the Constituent Assembly of Moca, held on March 1, 1858, although he resigned from office on the day August 28 of that same year. He was exiled to the United States. The liberal constitution of Moca was annulled and General Santana returned to govern with the Constitution of 1854, which guaranteed him an authoritarian government.

His government's priorities consisted of improving the monetary system and reorganizing the public administration and the army. The highlight of his brief tenure was the move of the country's capital to Santiago.

== Last years and death ==
As a supporter of the annexation to Spain, which occurred in 1861, General Valverde returned to his country, collaborating with the Spanish officials. Several years later, the Dominican Restoration War had ravanged on the island. He accompanied the Spanish in their retreat to Puerto Plata. He settled down to live with his family in Santo Domingo. He was appointed by the Spanish government as Field Marshal of the annexationist army. He held the position of Director of Administration of the annexationist government. With the support given to the Spanish army, his figure fell into total discredit that was never lifted. After Spain's defeat, Valverde left the island.

In exile, he began a journey through several Ibero-American and European countries until Valverde settled permanently in Spain, acquired numerous properties in Tierra de Campos, Province of Valladolid, where a relative of his was death Deputy in Cortes for the constituency of Villalón de Campos. Although, Valverde never intervened directly in Spanish politics.

During Báez's six-year government he was exiled. He then returned back to the country. He joined the Blue Party in 1879, led by General Gregorio Luperón. His figure did not rise in said party, due to his support for the annexationist government of 1861. He retired from political activities and dedicated himself to his family in the city of Santiago, where he died on December 23, 1903.

He was buried in the "March 30 Cemetery," in the so-called Untouchable Pantheons.

== Honors ==
In his honor, on March 27, 1958, a new province was created in the Dominican Republic, when the old province of Santiago was divided, giving it the name of Valverde Province, with capital in Santa Cruz de Mao (or simply Mao).

== See also ==
- List of presidents of the Dominican Republic
- Matías Ramón Mella
- Dominican War of Independence
- Cibaeño Revolution

== Sources ==
- Biography of José Desiderio Valverde . Available at: http://www.biografiasyvidas.com/biografia/v/valverde_jose_desiderio.htm . Retrieved January 28, 2016 .
- Gerón, Cándido. ( 2001 ). Dominican political dictionary (1821–2000), Santo Domingo, Editora de Colores.
- García, José Gabriel. (1968). Compendium of the history of Santo Domingo, Volume 3, Santo Domingo, Ahora.
- Martínez, Rufino. (1971). Dominican Biographical-Historical Dictionary, 1821-1930, Santo Domingo, Autonomous University of Santo Domingo.
- Valverde, José Desiderio (ca. 1825-1903) . Available at: http://www.mcnbiografias.com/app-bio/do/show?key=valverde-jose-desiderio . Accessed January 28, 2016.

Political offices
Preceded by Buenaventura Báez	President of the Dominican Republic; 1858	Succeeded by Pedro Santana
