= José María Cabral =

13th and 16th President of the Dominican Republic (1816–1899)

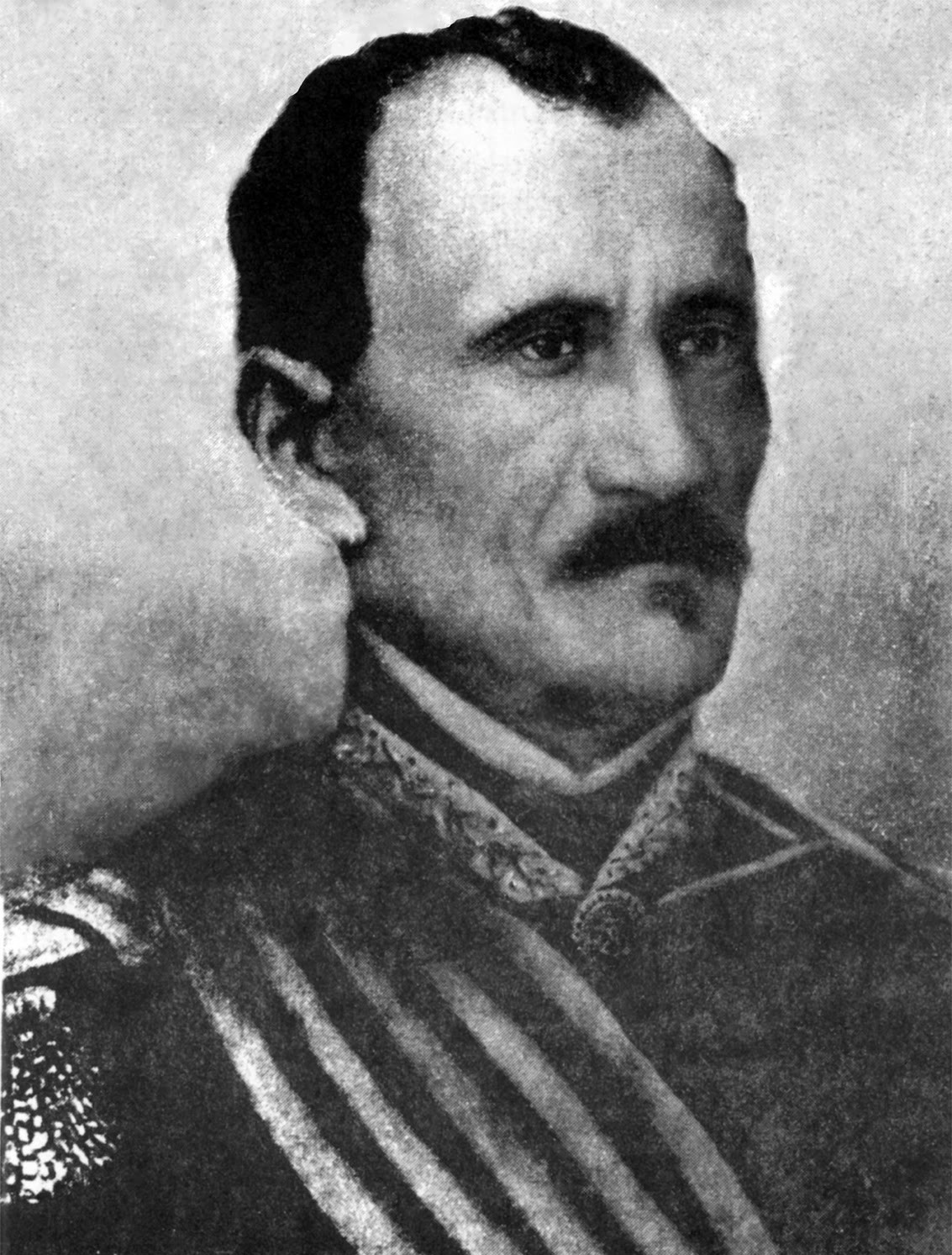
- Illustration of General José María Cabral
- Born: December 12, 1816; San Cristóbal, Dominican Republic
- Died: February 28, 1899 (aged 82) Santo Domingo, Dominican Republic
- Allegiance: Dominican Republic
- Branch: Dominican Army: Liberation Army; Restoration Army; Blue Army
- Service years: 1844–1899
- Rank: General
- Conflicts: Dominican War of Independence; Cibaeño Revolution; Dominican Restoration War; Six Years' War

13th President of the Dominican Republic
- In office August 4, 1865 – November 15, 1865
- Preceded by: Pedro Antonio Pimentel
- Succeeded by: Pedro Guillermo

16th President of the Dominican Republic
- In office September 29, 1866 – January 31, 1868
- Preceded by: Triumvirate
- Succeeded by: Manuel Altagracia Cáceres

General José María Cabral y Luna (born Ingenio Nuevo; December 12, 1816 – February 28, 1899) was a Dominican military figure and politician. He served as the first Supreme Chief of the Dominican Republic from August 4, 1865, to November 15 of that year and again officially as president from August 22, 1866, until January 3, 1868.

In his military career he stood out for his work commanding the troops that defeated Haiti in the Battle of Santomé (December 22, 1855), and even in the Cibaeño Revolution. After the annexation of Santo Domingo to Spain, decreed by General and President Pedro Santana in 1861, José María Cabral joined Francisco del Rosario Sánchez to fight against the annexation and restore the Republic. Once the country's independence was recovered in 1865, José María Cabral assumed the presidency of the second Dominican Republic. At the end of the same year, Buenaventura Báez took power, but was overthrown by Gregorio Luperón; Cabral then assumed his second presidential term.

A member of the Reform or Blue Party, José María Cabral's mandates were as arbitrary as those of his predecessors and successors. In 1868 he was overthrown by a movement that accused him of attempting to lease Samaná Bay to the United States. He then took part in the Six Years War, resulting in the overthrow of Báez. Afterwards, he lived his life away from political affairs until he died in 1899.

He was the only Dominican head of state that was a prominent participant in all 4 wars of liberation of the Dominican Republic.

== Early life and family ==
Little data has emerged about the first two decades of Cabral's life. He was born in Ingenio Nuevo, near San Cristóbal, on December 12, 1816. His family, which had ancient colonial backgrounds, Portuguese and Canarian, was part of the weak upper strata that remained in the country after the upheavals caused by the Treaty of Basel of 1795, which stipulated the transfer to France. The social position of his parents made it possible for young Cabral to go to England to study. He did not achieve an academic training, but instead concentrated on commercial studies. But the knowledge of the most developed country at the time penetrated his character and political conceptions. His identification with liberalism, as a current that gave support to an independent and democratic State, should not have been foreign to the English experience, the country where modern political institutions first emerged and where the first liberal thinkers met.

He was the uncle of future Dominican president Marcos Antonio Cabral.

== First Republic ==
=== Preparations for war ===
In 1844, Cabral was 27 years old, the age at which one begins to emerge from youth and one's personality traits are finally defined. Then he was already responding to the masterful characterization of his figure that, as if he were painting him live, made by the historian Sócrates Nolasco:

It is difficult to find another liberator of America so patient to read insults against his reputation without being moved or answering them. High and dry, sober and cold […]. His temperance was admirable and his fortitude in suffering was admirable. He ate, since he lived; but in parsimony no one equaled him. He thought and spoke, since he led men; but he used to remain silent for hours and hours, finally interrupted by a brief order or specific monosyllable. At times it seemed that it was going to become a stone monument.

He was still young, but he was ready to enter fully into the historical scene that was being inaugurated. Like so many others, he set out to contribute to the consolidation of Dominican independence. The great problem to overcome at that time was to crush the attempts of the Haitian government to annul independence and roll back the occupation that had begun since February 1822. Consequently, the race for arms was the order of the day for those who wanted to help the homeland. In accordance with his vocation, Cabral enlisted in the Dominican Army, taking part in the Battle of Azua. His warrior skills earned him promotions; In 1845 he was promoted to colonel and became part of the General Staff of General Antonio Duvergé, under whose responsibility was the defense of the Dominican territory, and therefore took part in all the important military actions that occurred in those first years of independent life on the southern border.

Friendly relations were established between Duvergé and Cabral, which must have contributed to completing our hero's military training. It must be taken into consideration that Duvergé was the number one strategist of the Dominican army. He had to systematize military action based on assault with edged weapons, in order to compensate for the inferiority in numbers and modern weapons. Duvergé's military doctrine was inspired by a long-standing memory that came from the 17th century, when the natives of the country, grouped in militias, successfully opposed the attacks of the buccaneers. Cabral was not actually a professional military man, since at that time the army was not a permanent institution, but was made up of recruits called up due to the aggressive plans of the Haitian rulers. When the danger ceased, everyone went home to take care of their usual affairs. And this was precisely what Cabral did, whose liberal ideas were not to the liking of conservative President Pedro Santana. Now, his military skills were beginning to be recognized, so Santana promoted him to general in 1855.

=== Dominican War of Independence ===
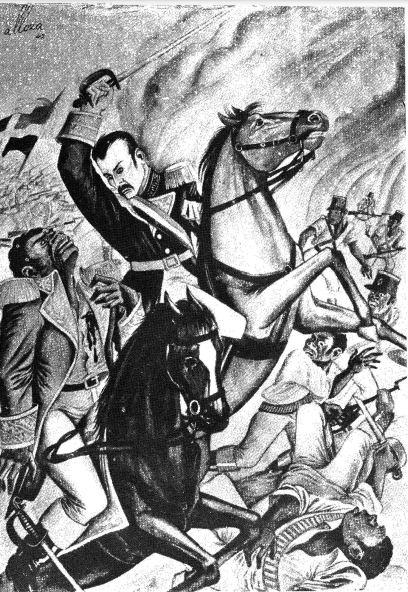
Cabral was a prominent figure during the fourth campaign, standing out in the Battle of Santomé.

During the first three campaigns of the Dominican War of Independence, between 1844 and 1849, Cabral participated as a second-rate officer, he covered himself with glory in the fourth campaign, between December 1855 and January of the following year. He had been appointed one of the leaders of the southern border when it was learned that the emperor of Haiti, Faustin Soulouque, was preparing to invade the country for the second time. After the start of the Haitian offensive, Santana did not want to give command of the troops to Cabral, despite the knowledge he had of the area, possibly because he did not inspire political confidence. The 12,000 men of the Haitian army advanced rapidly and the Dominicans had to retreat. The troops that regrouped in San Juan de la Maguana, composed of about 3,000 troops, were commanded by General Juan Contreras, a personal friend of Santana. Cabral was assigned leadership of the right wing. Santana threatened terrible punishments if the Haitians' horses drank water from the San Juan River. The combat took place in the Sabana de Santomé, a short distance from San Juan de la Maguana. General Contreras lost track of the entire battle. This caused a part of the troops on the left wing to believe that the Haitians had won, beginning the retreat. Given the vacuum created, Cabral assumed command and managed to inflict a devastating defeat on the Haitian army, leaving hundreds dead on the ground.

For the first time, Cabral exhibited his exceptional military skills. He represented an example of a military leader different from that of Santana, who always kept his distance from the theater of operations. In the Battle of Santomé, the figure of Cabral began to acquire legendary overtones. His subordinates were amazed to see him fighting like a beast in the first line of fire. In the midst of the heat of combat, another of his personality traits emerged: humanity. When the general in chief of the Haitian troops, Antoine Pierrot, Duke of Tiburon, saw that defeat was imminent, he preferred to lose his life and rushed almost alone against the Dominican lines. Cabral gauged his enemy's intention and set out to save his life, revealing a respectable sense of honor. But he arrived late to the duke, who was killed by a Dominican's machete.

Over time, a legend circulated, contrary to the facts, according to which the Dominican general severed the head of the Haitian duke in a hand-to-hand duel. Santomé's victory stopped Soulouque's plans in their tracks and ratified the ability of the Dominicans to maintain independence thanks to their own forces. It also ended up evidencing the incapacity of the Haitian army, despite its numerical and weapons advantage. Cabral was covered in glory, as one of the signature personifications of the country, which was recognized by Congress after Santana resigned from the presidency.

=== Cibaeño Revolution ===
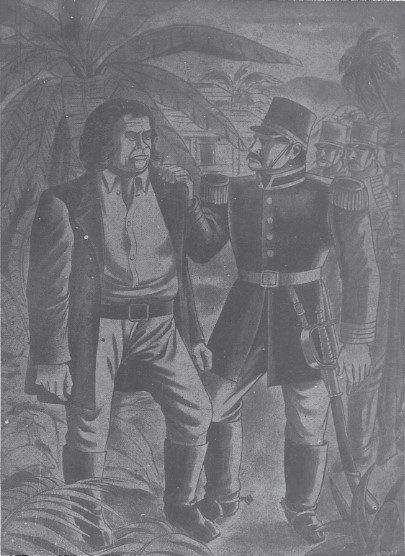
Illustration of Cabral arresting General Pedro Santana

Since the struggle for power between Santana and Buenaventura Báez began in 1848, after the latter's first administration concluded, Cabral took his side, although initially discreetly. When Báez returned to the presidency in mid-1857, he found in Cabral one of his few supporters with military merits. The new president entrusted Cabral with the symbolic mission of heading to El Seibo to bring Santana prisoner and deport him. As historians such as Sócrates Nolasco and Rufino Martínez have explained, Baecism at that time constituted an amalgamation of sectors that for various reasons repudiated Santana's despotism. Among them, young people from the city of Santo Domingo with liberal leanings stood out.

Due to the civil war of 1857 and 1858, when the leading sectors of Santiago questioned Báez's actions, Cabral held the main military responsibility for Baecism, as commander of the province of Santo Domingo. He directly confronted Santana, to whom the Cibaeños ceded leadership of the siege over the centuries-old walled city. Despite the enthusiasm of the young people of the capital, their cause was lost, since they were opposed by the rest of the country.

== Annexation period ==
=== Early resistance ===
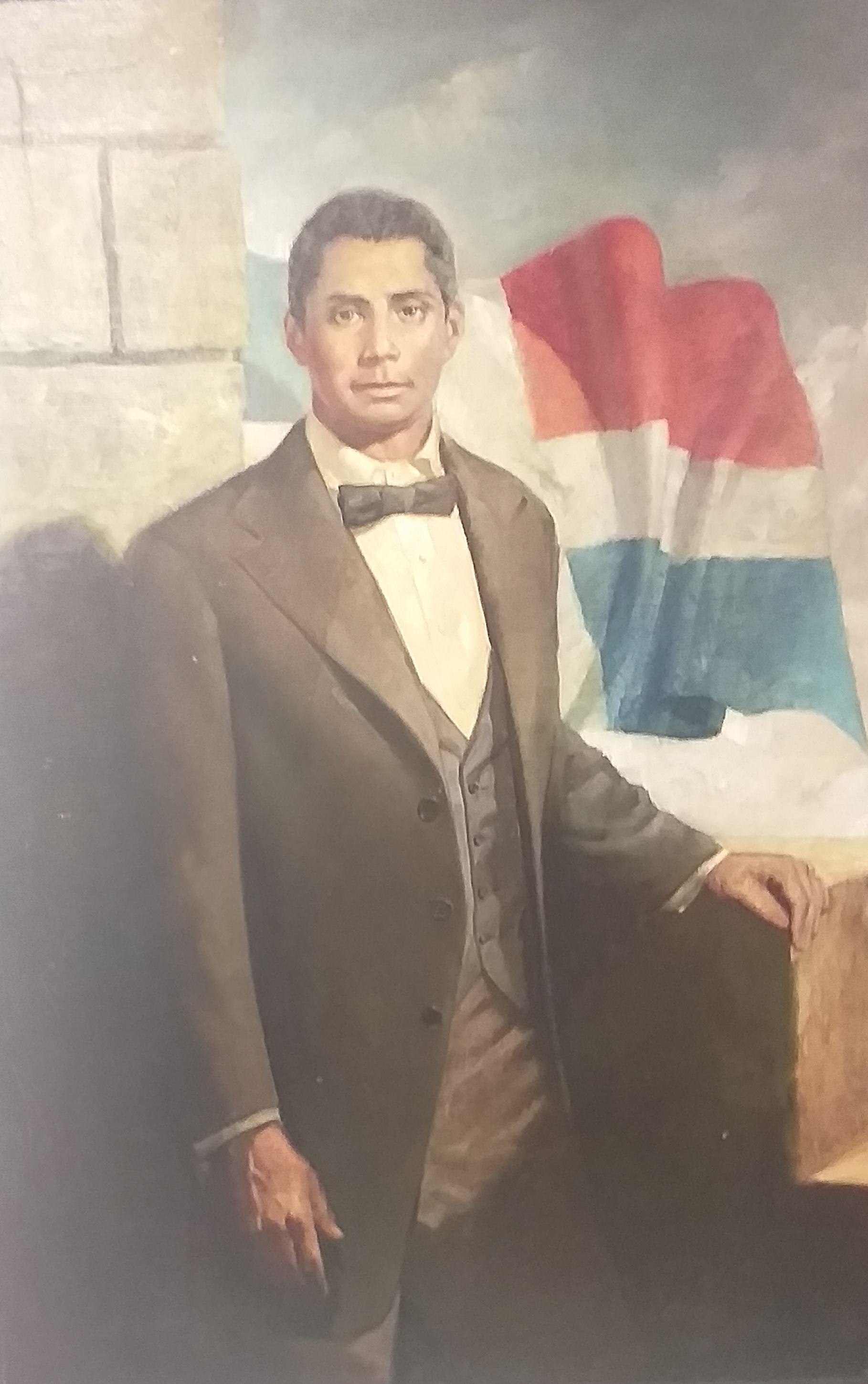
Angered by the loss of sovereignty, Cabral took part in the early resistance, led by Francisco del Rosario Sánchez, to stop the annexation.

Báez had to abandon power in mid-1858 and Santana ignored the government of Santiago the liberal constitution promulgated in Moca months before. Cabral left the country with the fallen president and his collaborators. But, like so many Baecistas of that time, he remained with the former president to the extent that he represented the opposition to Santana. On the occasion of Santana's plans to annex the Dominican Republic to Spain, Cabral's national and democratic position was strengthened, in contrast to Báez's ambiguity. He withdrew towards Europe, leaving his supporters free to oppose Santana's plans, but in the end he sought the position of field marshal of the Spanish army in the hope of replacing Santana as the dominators' favorite. Faced with such action, some friends of Báez united under the leadership of Francisco del Rosario Sánchez, who defined the reasons for the opposition to the annexation and proposed to conclude an alliance with the Haitian government of Fabré Geffrard to fight against it.

After Sánchez released his glorious manifesto on 20 January 1861, Cabral himself issued his own manifesto. Just like Sánchez, he denounced Santana as a traitor and attacked the Spanish regime, which still held authority in Cuba and Puerto Rico. He would go on to call the Dominican people to arms, highlighting the importance of the many revolutionary struggles of freedom that shook North America. His manifesto stated:

Saint Thomas, March 30, 1861

DOMINICANS!

Eighty-five years ago the first cry of freedom and independence resounded in virgin America. This sublime cry raised by the firstborn of the republics, the homeland of Washington, was welcomed by the most advanced of nations in modern civilization. Noble France lent North America its treasures, its ships, the prestige of its approval and even its heroes.

Shortly after, a prodigy was seen that has lately been appreciated at its fair value, the sublime genius of Victor Hugo and Lamartine. The world saw, astonished, the scream that the oppressed classes raised in the western part of the island of Santo Domingo turned into harangues and cheers for freedom, and the descendants of Africa formed a republic that remains today on the path of civilization and progress.

The entire world of Spanish America and the Spanish part of the primacy of the Indies claimed their rights to independence, and alone among the great Antilles, Cuba and Puerto Rico were left, with stains of ignominy on the map of the New World, although it is true that their noble sons, if they have not been able to triumph over the tyranny that overwhelms them, have known how to provide victims for the holocausts of despotism.

The Spanish part of the island of Santo Domingo, after proclaiming its independence in 1821 and after having remained free for 22 years, united with the western part, saw its wishes crowned by rising to the rank of free and independent nation on February 27, 1844 with the recognition and moral protection of the civilizing powers, in whose number Spain itself entered.

The proverbial misfortune that has pursued this island since its discovery meant that the Dominican Republic would of course fall into the hands of a barbaric but fortunate despot, who has played with its destinies in the most scandalous way that the history of tyranny could tell and the aberrations of despotism. After seventeen years of heroic struggle, of noble sacrifices; through the most dislocated procedures and using the most absurd and most concealed hypocrisy that a miserable traitor has ever used, we have witnessed the most ignoble and degrading act that human understanding can conceive: this act is scandal and shame from America.

Pedro Santana, the tyrant of Santo Domingo, the Domitian of the Antilles, after exploiting and tyrannizing the Dominican Republic for seventeen years; enjoying uncontested power and in the midst of tranquility and progress advocated in all the newspapers of the Republic, he gave, in the primacy of the Indies, the first example of abandonment of national independence in favor of subjection to foreign despotism. Nineteen days after having celebrated the seventeenth anniversary of independence, and having sworn in the interests of the homeland, to support it, he lowered the national flag and raised the Spanish flag in the middle of an unnoticed and stunned population in the presence of a act as criminal and reckless as it was unexpected.

What words can ever express with their due force the enormity of the betrayal? It seems that one is witnessing a farce, where the assumption prevents the feigned spectacle from affecting the mood as it should, given the reality of what is witnessed; because on the day of March 18, when the most serious act that a town can witness was carried out in the capital of Santo Domingo, not only was there a lack of pomp, which should not even have been imitated by routine, but even the sanction of terror with which despotism knows how to decorate its actions when it cannot make it love.

Thus the Dominicans in half an hour stopped being Dominicans and became Spanish, without applauding, without fearing, without approving or resisting: it seems that the excess of this unspeakable act destroyed all kinds of popular sensation. This impassivity of the capital has been the occasion for Santana to have consummated his iniquitous act in other towns of the republic after the towns had been disarmed, flying the Spanish flag in the manner that has already been said, making people believe that there was a combined plan and ponderable resource of Spanish forces.

No one ignores that throughout the republic, and mainly in the capital itself, there was a feeling of invincible repugnance against such a project. But Santana has been careful, after banning the entire national party, to disarm all the towns, as has already been said, and to put in prison the characters whose liberal sentiments made him fear a patriotic resistance.

Now, what legality can be given to the sale of a town, when its will has not been consulted beforehand? They want to assert the argument that the populations have received the change of nationality, spontaneously, but this is not only a complete falsehood, but, even if it were true, it would mean nothing in favor of Santana's betrayal, who by the mere fact of being its first president and having sworn in the interests of the homeland and before the nation to defend and guarantee national independence, was less permitted than anyone else to destroy that nationality that has cost so many sacrifices, and which is the only good that Dominicans have enjoyed under his fatal and bloodthirsty power.

When all of America is free and independent; When the island of Cuba itself has to periodically witness the banning and gallows with which its most illustrious sons are punished for their aspirations to freedom and independence, is it conceivable that a people that enjoys these benefits would sacrifice them to favor of a power whose colonial system makes it unbearable in America?

Spain, Dominicans, has to follow one of these two systems to govern you: either it must leave you the civil liberty, political freedom and equality that you have enjoyed for forty years, or it must govern you with a system of civil or political slavery, with their race concerns and their inequality of hierarchies. The first system is impossible, because it implies contradiction with its own interests; The second is forced to follow him so as not to give cause for complaint and to preserve the colonial balance of Cuba and Puerto Rico.

It is true, Dominicans, that the first days they will flatter you with salaries and with demonstrations of feigned consideration; but this will be very temporary. As soon as Spain secures her domination, you will find yourself subjected to the vilification of the most capricious taxes and the most shocking inequality; then you will see that you will have exchanged your flag in vain, because you will be Spanish as subjects, but you will always remain as a conquered people, and whose fear of thinking about their freedom again will make the government adopt the harshest and most humiliating measures with such that they assure him of the prey he wishes to conquer. Spain cannot set the bad example of respecting in Santo Domingo the freedom and equality that it prescribes in Cuba and Puerto Rico; Then you will see that the change of flag has only been carried out to ensure the peaceful enjoyment of a few who will enjoy the price of your freedom.

Keep in mind, Dominicans, that the word annexation with which they want to fascinate us is nothing more than a gross deception: that the Dominican Republic cannot in any way form part of the Spanish monarchy: it cannot be more than a colony, as are Cuba and Puerto Rico, that is to say: land of slaves, land of oppression for its inhabitants, land of inequality for the poor and the little ones, land of humiliation and contempt for those who are not noble; land, in short, that can only suit the satraps who govern it and the henchmen who collect the first fruits of despotism, sacrificing all personal dignity.

Dominicans! To the weapons! You who, at the price of your blood and your rest, formed the Dominican Republic, have enough courage to rebuild it again. To achieve such a noble goal, all you have to do is join the leaders of honor who are fighting to regain your freedom and independence, to once again raise the banner of the cross.

Dominicans! To the weapons! Gather around that flag that you have led to victory so many times. Sacrifice all past resentments for the sake of the homeland, and from now on there will be only one party: the national party, on the other side only Santana will be left with the four achievers who have speculated with your freedom and independence. Be encouraged and fight, certain that victory will come to meet you. Do not forget that the great Bolívar said these words that since then have served as a consolation to all the oppressed: "the people who want to be free, there is no power that can subject them to slavery."

If a single man, if a greedy and denatured despot has been able to sell you as slaves, you must refute this concept by declaring yourselves free, independent and Dominican, so that posterity, when reading the history of the political events of our country, sees that if the Dominican Republic has produced a treacherous and cowardly monster, capable of selling the nation it governed; there has also been a brave and generous people who rejected such ignominy and regained their freedom and rights.

Long live the Dominican Republic!

Long live freedom!

Long live Religion!

Sánchez's second in that glorious day, placed at the head of military operations, could not be other than Cabral himself. Both had fought shoulder to shoulder in 1857 and did so again in June 1861, in the expedition they led from Haitian territory. Sánchez took command of the central column of the expeditionary force, while he assigned Cabral the left column, whose mission was to take Las Matas de Farfán and advance from the west on San Juan de la Maguana. Fernando Tabera was assigned the right column, which should fall on Neiba.

The progress of the expedition was stopped as a result of the cessation of Geffrard's help, as a result of pressure from Joaquín Gutierrez de Rubalcava, who sent a Spanish flotilla to the bay of Port-au-Prince, threatening to bomb the city if support for the Dominican patriots was not withdrawn. Upon receiving the news, Cabral understood that the expedition was doomed to failure, so he unilaterally ordered the withdrawal and returned to exile. Although he sent a message to Sánchez, informing him of his decision, the absence of political sense that is often typical of the military was evident, since the correct thing would have been, before ordering withdrawal, to wait for Sánchez's dispositions. The above does not mean that Cabral had responsibility in the holocaust of Sánchez and his companions, since they were victims of the betrayal of Santiago de Óleo, one of the influential men in the El Cercado area, who set up an ambush with a view to reconciling with the Spanish government.

Cabral never abandoned the military vision of things, which probably constituted the greatest limitation of his career. Despite the services he rendered to the independence of the country, he lacked a political and intellectual proposal for the national order, unlike heroes such as Juan Pablo Duarte, Francisco del Rosario Sánchez, Pedro Francisco Bonó or Matías Ramón Mella. In the same way, this absence of political elaboration led him to moderate positions that avoided harshly confronting the agents of despotism and annexationism. In accordance with this mood, when the Spanish rulers ordered an amnesty that favored those who had opposed the annexation, Cabral lowered the battle flag because he judged that there was no possibility of renewing the insurrectional fight. In a document dated July 6, 1861, he accepted the fait accompli of Spanish rule and later returned to the country, where he remained calm, awaiting the course of events.

=== Dominican Restoration War ===
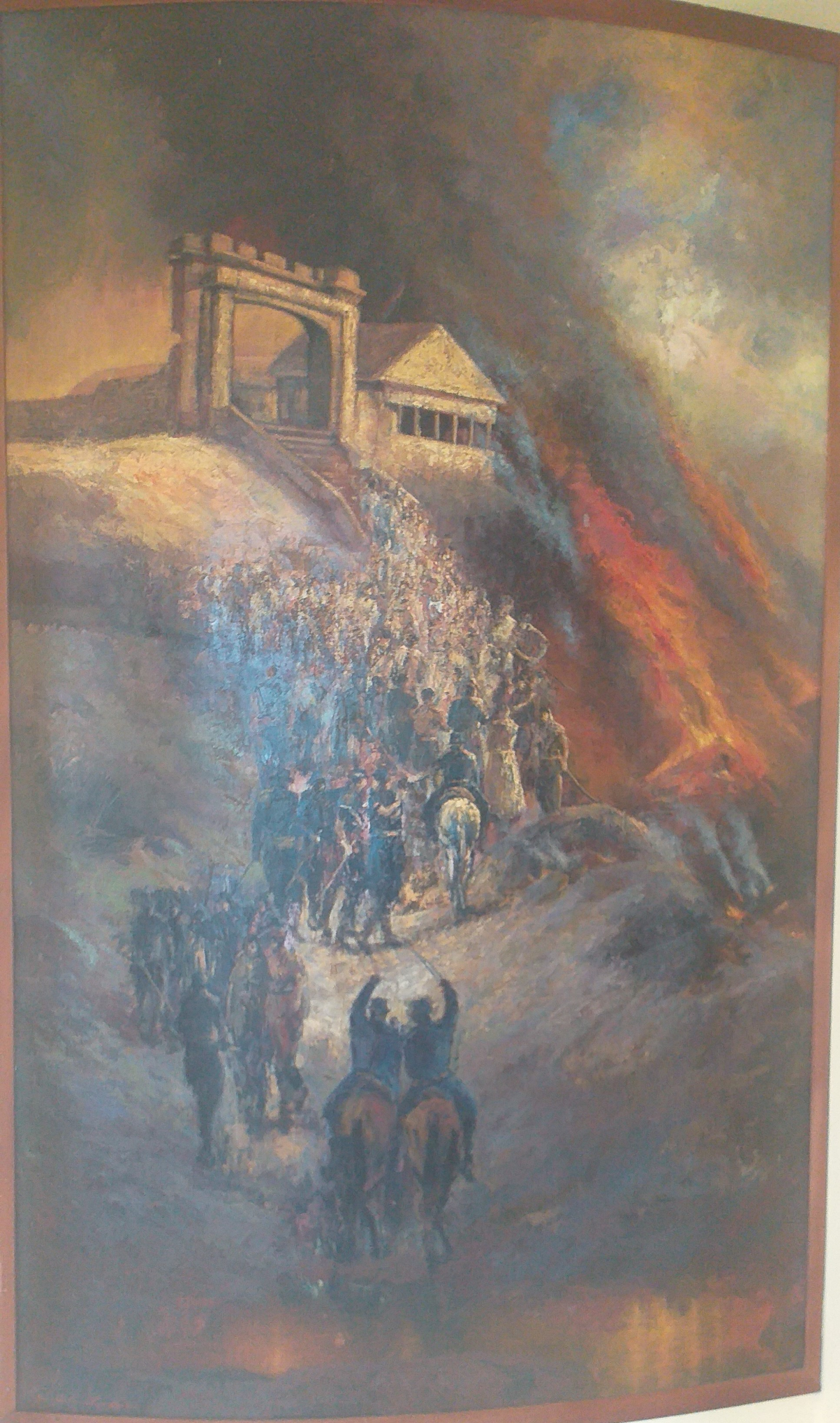
Monument depiction of the Siege of San Luis Fortress during the Dominican Restoration War.

After the Dominican Restoration War began, in August 1863, Cabral was deported abroad, suspected of sympathizing with the rebels. When he set foot on homeland again, in June 1864, the Spanish troops had been deploying an offensive in the south for some time. To respond to this advance, the then chief restaurateur in the region, Pedro Florentino, had responded with the application of terror measures against the Spaniards, which did not prevent chaos from spreading in the national ranks. Adverse circumstances prevailed, such as the influence that the Mocano Juan de Jesús Salcedo had in the region, who acted in the style of a bandit leader. General Manuel María Castillo, perhaps because he was not a native of the region, could not print unity to the resistance against the annexationist General Eusebio Puello. After failed attempts to straighten things out in the south, the Restoration Government of Santiago entrusted the leadership of that front to Cabral, counting on his knowledge of the area and his gift of command. From the first days in the leadership, the inferiority in which the Dominicans found themselves in the south began to be reversed. Cabral managed to remove Juan de Jesús Salcedo and other leaders who were involved in looting scenes from circulation, and gave assurances to those who had sought the protection of the Spanish out of fear. He imposed order on military formations and prepared the conditions for the counteroffensive.

The opportunity to consolidate the recovery of the national cause arose in the Battle of La Canela, on December 4, 1864, when the troops led by Cabral defeated those of General Eusebio Puello. The Dominicans ambushed the enemy and caused a large number of casualties, with those who were saved fleeing. From then on the pace of operations entered an ascending phase, and Cabral proceeded to advance over almost the entire territory, with the exception of the cities near the coast and its surroundings. Since the beginning of 1865, the city of Santo Domingo was almost under siege, since the restoration guerrillas dominated the territory that separated it from San Cristóbal. Cabral became the champion of the Restoration in the south and obtained the support of almost all the generals, who saw him as the guarantor of victory. The war in the region took an autonomous course from that dictated by the Santiago government. Since the Spanish troops abandoned the country, on July 11, 1865, a regionalist feeling emerged among the southern generals, who considered that it was no longer valid for the capital of the Republic to continue in Santiago, as was the intention of the Cibaeño president Pedro Antonio Pimentel. He understood the weak position he was in and decided to move to Santo Domingo; But along the way he was surprised by a pronouncement by generals led by Eusebio Manzueta who proceeded to overthrow him. On August 4, 1865, Cabral was proclaimed protector, a title with which he was elevated to the presidency of the Dominican Republic.

== Post-restoration War ==
=== First presidency ===
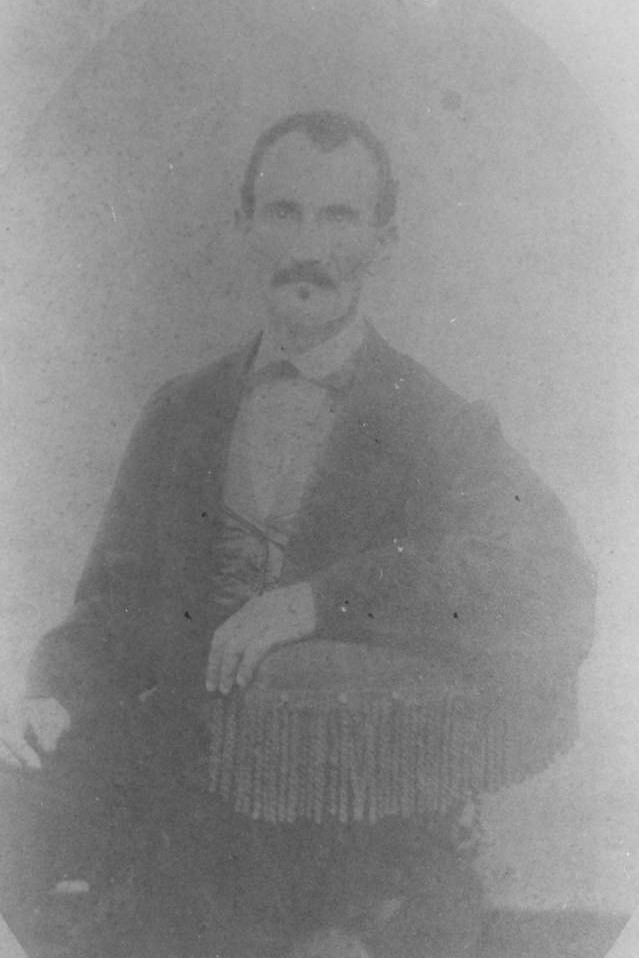
Photograph of Cabral, c. 1860s

Cabral's first administration was known as the Protectorate. According to the historian Roberto Cassá, the new government faced regionalist divisions and the challenge of national unity following two years of war that had left the country economically devastated, and early hopes for rapid recovery were constrained by the country's economic and cultural conditions.

Covered with enormous prestige, the protector set out to reconcile all Dominicans, so he offered positions in the government train to prepared people who had collaborated with the Spanish authorities, regardless of whether they had been followers of Santana or Báez. He aspired to the establishment of a democratic regime, subject to the government of the most capable, since he was convinced that the mission of governing was reserved for those endowed with an adequate cultural level. It can be inferred that, imbued with patriotism and genuine selflessness, he considered his mission as president from the angle of the man at arms called to guarantee the correct exercise of power by the capable. The truth is that the title of protector that the southern generals gave him was tailored to their intentions.

Following this logic, and in line with his modesty, he adopted a low profile as president, delegating a large part of his powers to Juan Ramón Fiallo, a lawyer he trusted, who advocated a moderate orientation aimed at attracting the support of conservative sectors. Cabral was identified with Fiallo's conception, as he believed that it was imperative to unify the thinking sectors in the government and that their execution should guarantee the correct functioning of the institutions and economic activity, which in the first place meant offering guarantees to the merchant exporters and importers from the ports, almost all foreigners, who dominated the country's economy.

But his government, despite the favorable reception from the higher sectors, could not do anything in a country suffering from tremendous difficulties, in the first place because it enjoyed less than three months of stability. In October 1865, the leader Pedro Guillermo, one of the leaders of the Restoration in the east, raised the banner of rebellion and dragged other strong men in the demand that Buenaventura Báez be brought to the presidency. Like so many other local leaders of the Restoration, Guillermo had been a supporter of Báez until 1861, and he did not find it contradictory to his fidelity to the leader that he had taken the oath to the Spanish flag while he was taking part in the national war. Cabral tried to resist, seeking support from reserve units around Santo Domingo; but when Pedro Guillermo appeared threatening on the other side of the Ozama, he chose to seek a negotiated solution to the situation. He decided to comply with the demand of the rebellious leaders, for which he attested to his former sympathy for Báez and offered to go look for him in his exile in Curacao in order to hand over the presidency to him.

In truth, Cabral had long before ceased to be counted among Báez's followers, since his prominence during the Restoration had made him a symbol of the national cause, in diametric opposition to someone who had managed a position in Spain. But the fields had not yet been demarcated and Cabral preferred, like almost all the leaders of the feat, to temporize with Báez. The latter, eager to gain new supporters among the military leaders of the recently concluded war, offered Cabral the Ministry of War and Navy. It did not take long before insurmountable differences arose between Cabral and the new President. The first realized that his former boss had the objective of establishing a dictatorial regime that would guarantee his preeminence. Cabral could no longer help but see in Báez a confessed supporter of handing over the country's destinies to a power. On the other hand, despite his lack of political ambitions, he had to come to the conclusion that his category was far above that of Báez's subordinate.

=== Second presidency ===
Cabral left the country prepared to promote an insurrectional movement. On April 26, 1866, he published a manifesto in Curacao that constituted a memorial of grievances against Báez. He accused him of having illegally occupied office through violence, exercising power arbitrarily and without subjection to the law, ignoring the liberal constitution and having supplanted it with that of 1854 that enshrined despotism, as well as filling the prisons with opponents, put pressure on congressmen, allow excesses and exactions, compromise the country's credit through a large debt abroad and waste budget resources.

With these arguments in hand and having obtained the support of Andrés Ogando and other generals who had been his subordinates during the Restoration, Cabral crossed the border. The uprising in the south was followed by a demonstration in Puerto Plata that brought Luperón from his exile in the Turks and Caicos Islands. Báez did not have the strength to stop the advance of Cabral and Luperón's men. He sent Pimentel, Minister of the Interior, to confront the uprising in Cibao, but the former president joined the rebels, his colleagues from the Restoration. Báez abdicated and a Triumvirate composed of Gregorio Luperón, Pedro A. Pimentel and Federico de Jesús García took over the government. In accordance with the conception of Luperón and Pimentel, their sole objective was to call elections for the designation of a definitive government. Cabral was selected as the candidate of liberal circles, who were already beginning to recognize themselves by the color blue, as opposed to the red of Báez's supporters. Luperón did not aspire to the presidency, Pimentel had not recovered from the discredit in which he was plunged at the end of the war and Cabral continued to be the leader who enjoyed the greatest recognition in the influential circles of the capital. On August 22, 1866, he was sworn in again as president of the Republic.

In this second government, Cabral once again entrusted the affairs of the government to Juan Ramón Fiallo, who placed the former Santanistas in the leading positions of the public administration, determined to erase the divisions that the national war had left and encouraged by the consideration that They had to be won as allies to confront Báez's prestige among leaders and peasants. Perhaps for this reason, since then some have interpreted that the blues were the same old followers of Santana, always determined to oppose Báez, a false conclusion since it ignored the emergence of an ideological current inspired by the ideals of the Restoration, which sought to give rise to a formal entity carrying liberal principles, which was called the National Party. What happened was that, to maintain validity and oppose Báez, the Santanistas decided to ally themselves with the liberals and they accepted them.

Armed with demagoguery, Báez presented himself as a champion of the humble people, in contrast to the liberal sector that defended the leading role of the educated minority of the middle class, although in truth his concept of progress hardly differed from that raised by his liberal enemies. Leaving aside national considerations, for him, progress had to be achieved in the shadow of a power; and, in the meantime, he was the only one endowed with the privileges to govern, so he had to do so invested with dictatorial prerogatives. For the blue liberals, both assumptions of the reds were unacceptable: the exercise of despotism as a guarantee of society and annexation to a power as a panacea for progress.

They believed that the people met the conditions to be agents of a happy destiny, through a democratic government. But to stay in power, facing the disorderly sedition of the leaders who idolized Báez, the blues resorted to exceptional measures, using repressive methods that did not differ much from those that characterized the conservatives.

Cabral's second government ordered the execution of those guilty of sedition, contradicting the abolition of the death penalty for political reasons that the same president had established in August 1865. Some red leaders were put to death, although in almost all of them The cases were tried in accordance with current laws. But the repressive measures could not contain the avalanche in favor of Báez, acclaimed by the majority of Dominicans. Faced with this, the blues clung to power, convinced that they represented justice, order and civilization, and that the revolution promoted by their enemies entailed the disappearance of respect for social interests and the rule of naked despotism.

In October 1868 the Reds began an insurrection in Monte Cristi, thanks to the support they received from Haitian President Sylvain Salnave and with the approval of the ruling circle in the United States, which operated through two unscrupulous adventurers, Joseph Fabens and William Cazneau. An alliance was being consolidated between the Reds and Salnave's supporters to oppose the concert between Haitian and Dominican liberals that tried to prevent a power, especially the United States, from occupying any portion of the island of Santo Domingo. The United States government, in effect, had outlined the guidelines of expanding its influence throughout the Caribbean, in order to consolidate naval superiority over the European powers and incorporate territories that would allow the supply of sugar, coffee and other tropical goods.

Immediately, the cabinet of Ulysses S. Grant, general in chief of the northern states that had defeated the southern states in the recently concluded Civil War, was urged to establish a naval base in the Caribbean area. Two points appeared especially attractive: the Môle-Saint-Nicolas, extreme northwest of Haiti, and the Samaná peninsula, northeast of the Dominican Republic. The Dominican government received the Samaná lease proposal through Undersecretary of State William Seward Jr., who visited Santo Domingo. Overwhelmed by the irresistible push of the Reds, Cabral made the tremendous mistake of accepting Pablo Pujol to travel to Washington, in order to complete the negotiations. The Dominican envoy reached an agreement with William H. Seward, Secretary of State, through which Samaná was leased for 29 years in exchange for one million dollars in cash and another million payable in weapons. This help was seen by the circle that surrounded Cabral as the only lifeline that would prevent the return of the Reds to power.

The effect of the Samaná leasing plan was completely disastrous. As soon as the details of the negotiation emerged, the exiled red leaders claimed that the blues had betrayed the country and were preparing for worse acts. An inevitable discredit fell on the Blues' regime, and sharp disagreements arose among themselves. Luperón decided to leave the country in protest, warning Cabral that he was ready to oppose with weapons in hand, in case the negotiations continued. His defection left a void impossible to fill in the Cibaeña region and contributed to precipitating the fall of the blue government.

== Six Years' War ==
=== Clashes with Báez ===
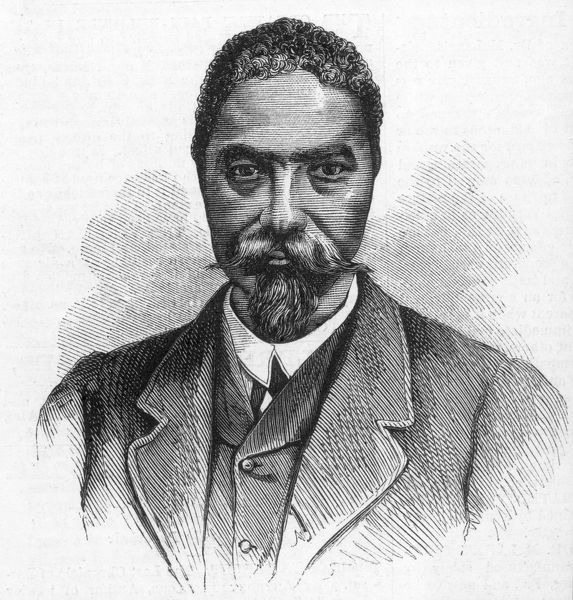
As tensions arose between liberals and the new government, some sought an alliance with the Haitians, especially with Sylvain Salnave (pictured).

With the entry into Santo Domingo of General Manuel A. Cáceres, on January 31, 1868, the so-called Six Years Government began, one of the most tragic periods in 19th-century history. Cabral and his supporters left the country for Venezuela and then spread between Puerto Rico, Curaçao and Saint Thomas. Some ventured to head towards Haiti, despite the presidency of Sylvain Salnave, to whom the Reds largely owed their victory. Despite the danger he could run and taking advantage of the presence of some of his supporters, Cabral spent several weeks in Haiti in mid-1868, taking steps to prepare for war against the Reds. The Haitian liberals, led by Nissage Saget, occupied the city of Jacmel, in the south of the country, and cooperation agreements were renewed between the liberals of both countries on the island. The blue volunteers played an important role in several defeats of Salnave's supporters. When the opportune moment arrived, after signing a unity pact with the other blue chiefs in the Haitian city of Saint Marc and while the civil war was developing in the interior of Haiti, Cabral got Saget's men to clear the way for him to the border, accompanied by few followers.

Returning to Dominican territory in March 1869, he once again took refuge under the protection of General Andrés Ogando, the main leader in the southwestern confines, where Báez had not managed to consolidate his presence. Cabral quickly obtained the support of other generals in the region and formed a considerable troop that was in a position to dispute the land with the government. Many of his supporters, who were in Haiti and other nearby countries, rushed to join him, ready to fight the inveterate Red enemies.

But the blues were in a disadvantageous situation. His rearguard in Haiti was insecure, since Saget's party still did not control the territory of that country in its entirety; At the same time, the Reds had unleashed a horrific escalation of terror. As the blue guerrillas spread, the government responded by creating flying gangs of outlaws that spread panic in the populations that were under the rule of the insurgents. The most famous leaders of these groups, Carlos Justo de Vargas and Aniceto Chanlatte, known by the nicknames Baúl and Solito, confessed years later, in a judicial process, that they had murdered 143 people, (94 people, respectively, with their hands). Additionally, Báez enjoyed an extraordinary charisma among the population, while the blues did not have any figure that unified them, victims of the disputes for hegemony between Cabral, Luperón and Pimentel, as well as, to a lesser extent, between some prestigious intellectuals. who supported them from exile. None of the three supreme chiefs was endowed with Báez's ability or surrounded by his aura of popularity. However, the blues were able to consolidate their extensive bastion beyond the Yaque del Sur River, because they represented the ascending sense of history, which tended to consolidate the national order, despite all the obstacles that arose.

The cause of the blues gained legitimacy when the Dominican government's preparations to annex the country to the United States became public. It was a vulgar sale, since corrupt officials from the United States ruling circle were involved in the operation, who hoped to seize enormous areas of Dominican territory at a bargain price. The shadow of the monster from the north was already beginning to unfold against the independence of the Dominican people. Before dissolving, the Dominican State would receive the sum of two million dollars, with the pretext of cleaning up public debts, but obviously aimed at compensating the ruling clique. On November 29, 1869, a preliminary protocol was signed between Manuel María Gautier, gray brain of the Red Party, and Raymond Perry, on behalf of the Washington government. In order to offer emergency aid to the Báez regime, a lease agreement for the Samaná peninsula was signed, which would come into force in the event that objections to the annexation appeared in the United States Congress. In exchange for $150,000 annually, the United States had sovereign prerogatives over the peninsula and the adjacent keys.

The annexation treaty stipulated that it must be ratified by the United States Congress and by the Dominican people through a plebiscite. This was hastily convened in February 1870, less than five years after the end of the Dominican Restoration War, throwing up the fallacy that only 11 Dominicans opposed integration as a territory, that is, a colony, of the United States. It is true that a large portion of Dominicans favored annexation for the following reasons: for many it was enough that Báez wanted it this way, who was given the gift of being infallible, like the pope; others were tired of the continuous state of wars, which they associated with poverty, coming to the conclusion that the only way for peace to reign was through foreign rule; A similar judgment was derived from the conviction of many people of high cultural level that the country lacked the means to undertake the march towards progress on its own, so some form of protectorate or annexation would be advisable.

The blues had been quite marginalized, but that does not mean that they constituted an insignificant minority, as proclaimed by the red publicists Félix María del Monte and Francisco Javier Angulo Guridi, who took pleasure in accusing the patriots of being bandits, agents of Haiti, calling them crooks. There is no doubt that the blues had the support of the most conscious portion of the population, but that could not be translated into practice, with the exception of the southern border area, due to the deployment of terror by the Baecista gangs or of how overwhelming the adhesion of a large part of the mass of the people to the figure of the former Spanish field marshal was.

Additionally, the blues were suffering from profound weaknesses that contributed to rebuilding the strength of their enemies, the most important of which was the division of their ranks between the followers of their three main leaders. The disputes between Cabral and Luperón were particularly serious, to the point that the latter came to express himself in a harsh and sometimes insulting manner about his companion, in various passages of Luperón's book, Autobiographical Notes and Historical Notes. The key to this rivalry was that each of them aspired to supreme leadership over operations. At the request of the Haitian liberals, a unity pact was signed between the Dominican liberal leaders. In fact, that instrument consecrated the supremacy of Cabral, who was assigned command of the Southern Front, the only one in which they had achieved implantation. Luperón and Pimentel, on the other hand, were not successful on the northern border, where the leaders were firmly united behind Báez and had the support of the peasant masses, who since 1857 viewed that tyrant as the defender of their interests.

Despite the pact of unity between the three leaders, each one continued to operate on his own. Luperón obtained support from the merchants of Saint Thomas, concerned about the negative consequences that annexation to the United States would cause them. He acquired the steamship El Telégrafo, from which he tried, without success, to attract support from the towns he was touching. Cabral refused to provide help to Luperón's plans, despite the deep symbolic meaning that El Telégrafo's adventure had to confront the plans of the United States government, which led to it declaring Luperón a pirate. To the extent that Cabral was the only one of the three who was fighting an effective war, his leadership was consolidated and he became recognized by almost all the exiles as the undisputed leader.

Cabral was once again covered in glory by becoming the symbol of the redemption of the Dominicans in the resistance against annexation to the United States. Once again he knew how to wisely apply his military skills, realizing that he lacked the resources and support required to overthrow Báez in the short term. He resorted to guerrilla warfare, a tactic that he had applied during the Restoration War from his late companion, Matías Ramón Mella, and that recognized the superiority of the enemy, which is why he avoided frontal clashes and relied on the control of the territory through small detachments that subjected the opponent to harassment. Although it is true that the blue troops dominated the territory to the west of the Yaque, they did so unstablely, subject to retreats every time the reds carried out expeditions from Azua.

Between 1869 and 1872, the war between the reds and the blues was characterized by expeditions led by government dignitaries, such as Francisco Antonio Gómez, Manuel Altagracia Cáceres, Juan de Jesús Salcedo and Valentín Ramírez Báez, the latter the father's brother of the President and his delegate in Azua. After each of these expeditions, it became clear that the Reds could not sustain the harassment of the Blues' guerrilla groups, so they proceeded to retreat towards Azua. As Socrates Nolasco observed, the garrisons they left in some parts of the desolate region were inevitably exterminated.

=== Salnave's offer ===
In February 1870, after Cabral had been directing the guerrilla resistance for nearly a year, the Haitian president Sylvain Salnave was overthrown and, leading 1,500 men, abandoned Port-au-Prince with the intention of escaping the besiegers of the city. Suffering several defeats along the way, Salnave was forced to enter the Dominican Republic with a view to benefiting from the protection of Báez. But he had to enter the area dominated by the blues. Since he learned of Salnave's arrival on Dominican soil, Cabral put all his troops on alert, fearing that the Baecistas would attempt a simultaneous attack from Azua. Furthermore, it was a matter of principle for him to prevent Haitian fugitives from crossing his territory armed. Cabral agreed to enter into negotiations with a delegation that Salnave offered to send.

When he saw that he made a countermarch and did not keep his promise, he prepared to attack him. He sent a small detachment, under the command of Colonel Bartolo Batista, who engaged in combat and had to retreat due to the superiority of Salnave's troops. Cabral then dispatched General Vidal Guitó with 150 men. The former Haitian president tried to mislead the blues and sent requests to Valentín Ramírez Báez to attack from Azua, which was carried out, although without results. On January 10, 1870, a bloody clash broke out between Dominican blues and Haitian Salnavistas in the area of La Cuaba, in the heart of the Bahoruco mountain range, near Polo. After several hours of combat, with heavy casualties on both sides, including General Guitó and women and children relatives of Salnave's entourage, he surrendered.

The newly installed government in the Haitian capital, chaired by Saget, an ally of Cabral, requested that Salnave be sent to him along with his companions, since they were accused of committing political crimes. In a desperate attempt to save himself, Alfred Delva, Salvane's former minister, offered Cabral a large sum of money in exchange for not handing them over. He reasoned that, with that sum, it would be easy for him to supply his troops to overthrow Báez. The former minister did not take into account the moral character of Cabral, who was outraged by such audacity. He decided to delegate the delicate matter that represented the fate of Salnave to a council of generals, in which he limited himself to serving as president. It was resolved, apparently unanimously, that Salnave and his assistants be handed over to the Haitian Government.

This decision immediately acquired highly controversial overtones, as Salnave and some of his comrades were shot by the Haitian authorities. Political leaders of the time and later historians have estimated that, with that decision, Cabral tarnished his personal history, because he did not observe the rule of neutrality in his territory. Even Luperón censures the decision in his memoirs, claiming that he made his protest public at that moment. It has been alleged that the Blues received a large sum of money from the Haitian government as a reward, and there are those who have dared to insinuate that Cabral benefited from the operation.

In reality, the sum delivered by President Saget was symbolic, since it was 5,000 pesos or dollars, an amount that, although for the blues it still had a certain weight, it had no effect on the progress of the war. It is also definitive that Cabral did not get his hands on that money. From this it can be concluded that the delivery of Salnave did not involve a pecuniary transaction. It must have been difficult for Cabral and some of his generals to agree to the Haitian regime's demand, but for reasons of political realism they were inclined to do so. Letting Salnave pass was equivalent to endangering the entire national cause, strengthening Báez, who could use him to harass the Haitian ally. It was proven that Salnave was a declared enemy of the Dominican patriots and that he had entered their territory in the spirit of war. One of his generals was the Dominican Tomás Cristo, who had distinguished himself at the siege of Jacmel. Additionally, the argument can be accepted that, by not having acceded to the request, Cabral and his companions put at risk the alliance with the Haitian liberals, which was vital to sustain the guerrilla resistance.

=== Conclusion of the war ===
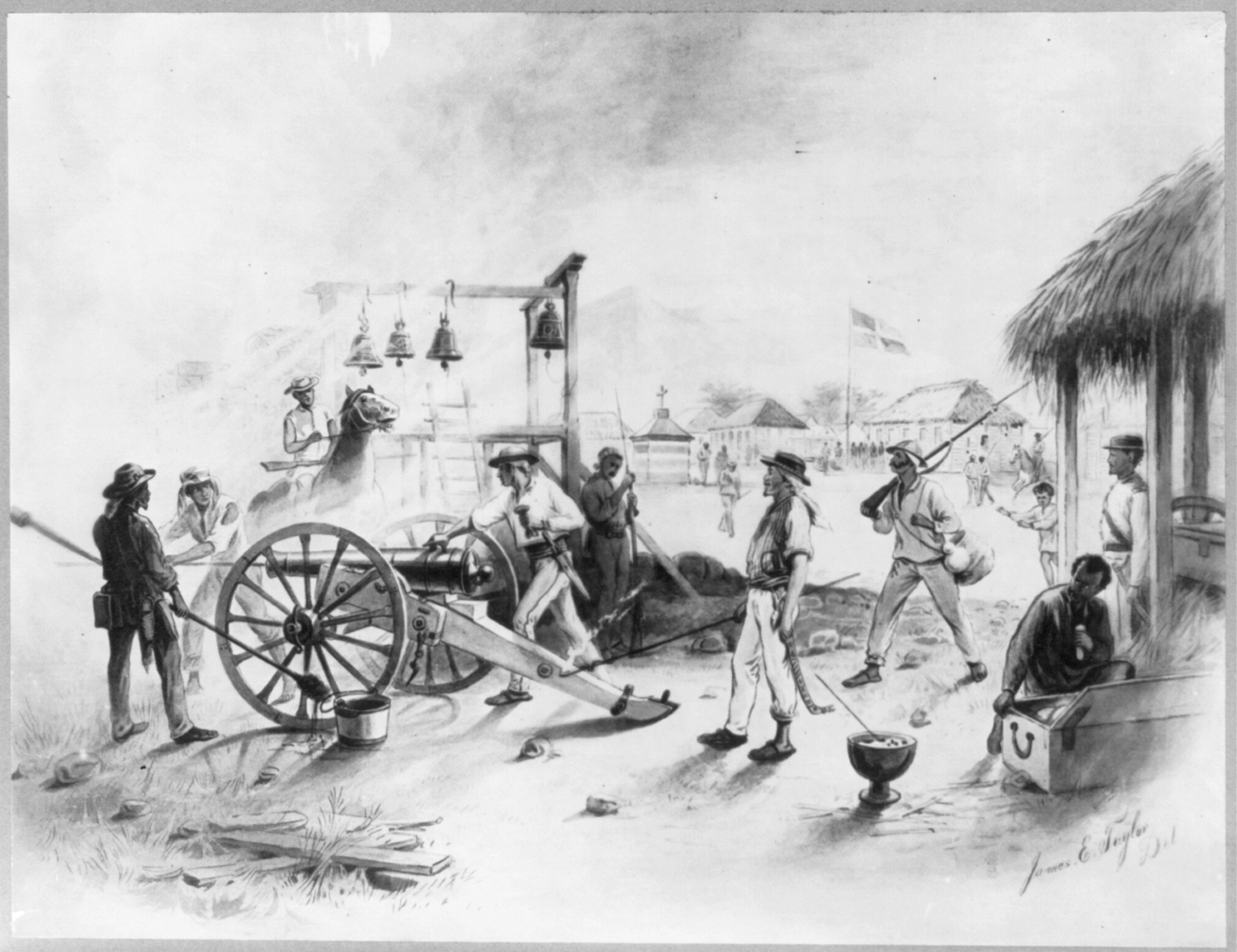
Illustration of Azua officials alerting of an attack by Cabral.

The war continued with the characteristic ups and downs, although in an ascending phase for the blues until 1871, thanks to the legitimacy of the objective of preventing annexation to the United States. When the patriot generals considered that they had consolidated their dominance over the extreme southwest, they decided to form a government with the title of Provisional Government of the Revolution, headed by Cabral as president of the Dominican Republic. The acts and arguments of this unique guerrilla government would be collected in a newspaper published in Haiti, which ended up with the name Dominican Pavilion. The Cabral government claimed to have control over the territory and tried to put together administrative devices.

In those very difficult circumstances, Cabral was concerned about guaranteeing individual safety and property; To prevent degeneration into banditry, any act of plunder was punishable by the death penalty. Despite all the triumphs, the conditions were not conducive to the functioning of the Provisional Government, and in December 1871 the ministers Alejandro Román and Mariano Antonio Cestero decided to abandon their positions without even presenting their resignation. There was a reorganization of the government into commissions for the Interior, Justice and Foreign Relations, Finance and Commerce, and War and Navy; As their directors were the main military leaders and intellectuals who accompanied Cabral, almost all of them generals, such as Andrés Ogando, Francisco Moreno, Manuel Rodríguez Objío, Manuel María Castillo, Tomás Ramón Castillo, Francisco Gregorio Billini and Timoteo Ogando.

After the failure of successive campaigns, Báez decided to personally lead a march in order to crush the guerrillas. He made a levy of nearly 10,000 men and he himself assumed the direction of the main body that fell on San Juan and Las Matas. Other bodies were in charge of his main lieutenants, such as Vice President, Manuel Altagracia Cáceres. Although the blues were not annihilated, the insurrection entered a phase of weakening, until it became something that stopped worrying the red hierarchs. This evolution is attributed by Nolasco to the murder of Andrés Ogando, while he was sleeping in Cambronal, at the hands of a party of government macheteros led by Baúl, who had managed to infiltrate behind the blue lines.

In 1873, Báez's focus shifted to resolving the growing conflicts he was confronting with his own followers. Perhaps the blues lost some legitimacy, after the annexation project had been rejected by the United States Senate in 1871. The cessation of the prospect of an annexation made Báez's fall a matter of time. There was a last respite due to the lease of Samaná for 150,000 dollars to a company supported by Fabens and Cazneau, the Samana Bay Company of Santo Domingo, in accordance with the same clauses of the instrument that for this purpose had been previously signed with the government of the United States.

That money had cardinal importance for Báez, since in those years no government could sustain itself if it did not have extraordinary financial resources. In 1870, the Jewish banker Edward Hartmont subscribed debt securities in the name of the Dominican government for about 450,000 pounds sterling, of which he only delivered 38,000. This notorious fraud prevented the Dominican Government from contracting other loans abroad.

From mid-1873 signs of discontent began to appear on the Northwest Line, to the point that some of the main supporters of the government in that region proposed to overthrow it. On November 25 of that year, the two top red leaders of Cibao, Manuel Altagracia Cáceres and Ignacio María González, began a movement that put an end to the Six Years regime. November 25 had a transcendental importance in Dominican history, since it meant the consolidation of the national State. From then on, no ruler dared openly advocate annexation to the United States. Historian Pedro Henríquez Ureña characterized the change that occurred as a product of the Dominican people's understanding of the nation.

These facts highlight that the Six Years tyranny did not fall as a result of the resistance of the blues; but it does not diminish the significance of the war that the patriots led by Cabral waged for four years in the confines of the southwest. In his opposition to President Grant's plan to annex Dominican territory, Massachusetts Senator Charles Sumner argued that the resistance led by General Cabral constituted evidence contrary to the results of the plebiscite orchestrated by Báez. Sumner was animated by liberal ideas, which is why he disapproved of the authoritarianism of the reds and identified with the cause of the blues. To gain credit with international public opinion, the blues organized a plebiscite in the territory they dominated, casting more than 6,000 votes against the annexation. Sumner forcefully refuted the allegations of his colleague Oliver P. Morton, in the sense that José María Cabral was “merely a bandit leader who does not harm and has not harmed the Báez government.” But the failure of the annexation project was also motivated by racist considerations, since several of the American congressmen considered that the Dominican people were not suitable for civilized life. In the debates, New York Senator Fernando Wood, for example, spoke disparagingly about the Dominicans:

The population is of a highly degenerate type, being mainly composed of a race whose blood is two-thirds native African and one-third Spanish Creole, unlike any colored race known in this country or anywhere in the world. This is a mixture completely incapable of assimilating civilization, and disqualified, under any possible circumstances, from becoming citizens of the United States and exercising, as all do under our present modified system, the privileges of representation and of being represented.

== Final years ==
Once the Six Years' government fell, Cabral became outdated as a politician, as José Gabriel García rightly perceived in a letter. His contribution to the national cause was strictly military, and the danger of an annexation project had already disappeared. Under these conditions, Cabral stripped himself of all party spirit, responding to the clamor of the thinking groups that demanded an end to civil strife. He considered that his contribution should become that of a moderating entity, with the express purpose of contributing to peace. He showed his detachment and offered support to the government of Ignacio María González, being appointed by this Minister of War and Navy in 1875. But Luperón, the other blue man, thought very differently; Although he did not aspire to occupy the presidency, he did intend for power to pass into the hands of the liberal sector. For this reason, Luperón came into conflict with President González and supported the civic movement that led to his overthrow in 1876.

That same year, still under the presidency of Ulises Francisco Espaillat, Cabral, identified, accepted the position of Agricultural Inspector of the province of Azua. But, unlike Luperón, he had distanced himself from his own party. That led him to support Buenaventura Báez in his fifth and last administration, which began in 1877, when the tyrant of the Six Years declared himself a democrat. Cabral did not act alone in approaching his former boss, since, for the sake of peace, several of the prominent intellectuals of Santo Domingo, such as: Emiliano Tejera, José Gabriel García and Mariano Cestero, offered their assistance to the last Báez government.

These positions expressed a reduction in the conceptual differences that until recently had mortally confronted the two currents of blue liberals and red conservatives. Now, Luperón continued to refuse to accept these positions, and it was up to him to maintain the identity of the blues. He was endowed with a more developed political sense than Cabral. And, although he did not have popularity, he became the sole leader of the liberals and prepared the ground for the seizure of power in 1879. As is known, in the following years, the blues implemented a kind of dictatorship, since, in The events prevented the electoral competition of the other political bands, which entered into a marked decline. It was under the aegis of Luperón that an integrated liberal conglomerate was formed, although a political party in the modern sense did not emerge then either.

Thus, the seizure of power by the blues, in 1879, meant that Cabral, its main founder, was removed from public affairs. After this, he spent long periods in San Juan de la Maguana. The house that Cabral built in that city is still standing, an eloquent example of the poverty in which he lived. He had the satisfaction of having contributed to the good of the country as much as possible, without pursuing wealth, power or glory. For this reason, he enjoyed the admiration of all those around him, who saw in him a living symbol of freedom.

At some point, he relocated to Santo Domingo, living his final moments there until he died on February 28, 1899, the day after the 55th anniversary of the national Dominican independence, at the age of 82. He was one of the last surviving veterans of the Dominican War of Independence, only survived by Timoteo Ogando, who died some nine years later in 1908.

== See also ==
- Gregorio Luperón
- Antonio Duvergé
- Francisco del Rosario Sánchez

== Ancestry ==
Ancestors of José María Cabral

16. Capt. Miguel Cabral Torres (1700–1749)
8. Marcos Cabral Maldonado (Mayor of Hincha; †1794)
17. Leonor Maldonado de Reyes
4. Marcos Cabral Valera (†1838)
18. Juan de Valera Sotomayor
9. Magdalena Valera Reyes
19. María Josefa de los Reyes Jiménez
2. Juan Marcos Cabral y Aybar (1792–1853)
10. Manuel de Aybar
5. María de Aybar y Luna
11. Petrona de Luna y Andújar
1. José María Cabral y Luna (1816–1899)
24. Blas de Luna Guzmán
12. Manuel de Luna y Andújar
25. Gregoria de Andújar Valera
6. Blas de Luna Franco
26. José Franco
13. Juana Franco Santana
27. Juana Santana
3. Mª. Ramona de Luna y Andújar (b. 1787)
28. Juan Hernández
14. Juan Evangelista de Andújar y Valera
29. Andrea de Valera
7. Mª. Francisca Andújar de Soto
30. Miguel de Jesús de Soto Prado (1706–1745)
15. Mª. Francisca de Soto y Franco
31. Mª. Dionisia Franco Peguero (1701–1791)

== Bibliography ==
- García, José Gabriel. Compendio de la historia de Santo Domingo. 4 vols. Santo Domingo, 1968.
- Luperón, Gregorio. Notas autobiográficas y apuntes históricos. 3 vols. Santo Domingo, 1974.
- Martínez, Rufino. Diccionario biográfico-histórico dominicano, (1821-1930). Santo Domingo, 1997.
- Monclús, Miguel Ángel. El caudillismo en la República Dominicana. Santo Domingo, 1962.
- Nolasco, Sócrates. José María Cabral y Luna. (El guerrero), Obras completas. 3 vols. Tomo II. Santo Domingo, 1994, pp. 447-468.
- Rodríguez Demorizi, Emilio. Proyecto de incorporación de Santo Domingo a Norte América. Santo Domingo, 1965.
- Rodríguez Objío, Manuel. Relaciones. Ciudad Trujillo, 1951.
- Soto Jiménez, José M. Semblanzas de los adalides militares de la independencia. Santo Domingo, s. f.

Political offices
Preceded by Triumvirate	President of the Dominican Republic; 1866–1868	Succeeded by Manuel Altagracia Cáceres
