= List of elections in 1874 =

The following elections occurred in the year 1874.

- 1874 Argentine presidential election
- 1874 Belgian general election
- 1873–74 Colombian presidential election
- 1874 German federal election
- 1874 Greek parliamentary election
- 1874 Honduran presidential election
- 1874 Italian general election
- 1874 Newfoundland general election
- 1874 Serbian parliamentary election

== North America ==
=== Canada ===
- 1874 Canadian federal election
- 1874 Manitoba general election
- 1874 New Brunswick general election
- 1874 Newfoundland general election
- 1874 Nova Scotia general election

=== Caribbean ===
- 1874 Dominican Republic general election

=== United States ===
- 1874 New York state election
- 1874 United States elections

==== United States Senate ====
- 1874 and 1875 United States Senate elections

==== United States House of Representatives ====
- 1874 United States House of Representatives elections
- 1874 United States House of Representatives elections in Florida
- 1874 United States House of Representatives elections in South Carolina

==== United States lieutenant gubernatorial ====
- 1874 Connecticut lieutenant gubernatorial election

==== United States gubernatorial ====
- 1874 Alabama gubernatorial election
- 1874 Arkansas gubernatorial election
- 1874 Connecticut gubernatorial election
- 1874 Delaware gubernatorial election
- 1874 Kansas gubernatorial election
- 1874 Maine gubernatorial election
- 1874 Massachusetts gubernatorial election
- 1874 Michigan gubernatorial election
- 1874 Missouri gubernatorial election
- 1874 Nebraska gubernatorial election
- 1874 Nevada gubernatorial election
- 1874 New Hampshire gubernatorial election
- 1874 New Jersey gubernatorial election
- 1874 New York gubernatorial election
- 1874 Oregon gubernatorial election
- 1874 Rhode Island gubernatorial election
- 1874 South Carolina gubernatorial election
- 1874 Vermont gubernatorial election

==== United States mayoral elections ====
- 1874 Boston mayoral election
- 1874 Madison, Wisconsin mayoral election
- 1874 Philadelphia mayoral election

== Europe ==
=== United Kingdom ===
- 1874 United Kingdom general election
  - 1874 United Kingdom general election in Ireland

== South America ==
=== Argentina ===
- 1874 Argentine presidential election

== See also ==
- Category:1874 elections
