= 1874 Dominican Republic general election =

General elections were held in the Dominican Republic in 1874. Ignacio María González was elected president.

== Results ==
=== President ===
Candidate	Votes	%
Ignacio María González	15,533	77.86
Manuel Altagracia Cáceres	4,209	21.10
Ulises Francisco Espaillat	93	0.47
Durocher	44	0.22
Pedro Valverde y Lara	10	0.05
Gregorio Luperón	7	0.04
Tomás Cocco	6	0.03
Juan Bautista Zafra	4	0.02
Manuel María Gautier	4	0.02
Pedro Francisco Bonó	3	0.02
José María Cabral	3	0.02
José Altagracia Cáceres	2	0.01
Ildefonso Damirón	2	0.01
Isidro Jimenes	2	0.01
Juan Nepomuceno Tejera	2	0.01
Juan de Jesús Salcedo	2	0.01
Eugenio Valerio	2	0.01
Ignacio Aquino	1	0.01
Damián Báez	1	0.01
José Caminero	1	0.01
Jacinto de Castro	1	0.01
Antonio García	1	0.01
Etanislao García	1	0.01
Manuel M. García	1	0.01
Eugenio González	1	0.01
Juan Letán	1	0.01
Juan Nepomuceno Núñez	1	0.01
Francisco Ortea	1	0.01
M.A. Peralta	1	0.01
Joaquín de Portes	1	0.01
Domingo Puchardo	1	0.01
Valentin Pérez	1	0.01
Federico Ramírez	1	0.01
Vicente Tavárez	1	0.01
Others	4	0.02
Total	19,949	100.00
Source: Campillo Pérez
