= Samana Bay Company of Santo Domingo =

Samana Bay Company of Santo Domingo Dominio de Samana
- Territory of United States
- 1872–1874
- Flag
- Demonym: Samanenses
- Government
  - Type: Commanders
- President
  - 1869–1873: Ulysses S. Grant
- Commander
  - 1869–1870: William Leslie Cazneau
- History
  - Established: December 28, 1872 1872
  - Disestablished: 1874
- Today part of: Samana

The Samana Bay Company of Santo Domingo was a company established in the mid-19th century with the aim of developing the Samaná Peninsula in the Dominican Republic.

== History ==
Following the failed annexation of Santo Domingo by the United States, the company, which was based in New York City, was granted a concession by the Dominican government to develop the area, including building infrastructure and attracting settlers. The agreement, which was signed on December 28, 1872 and ratified by the Senate of the Dominican Republic on February 19, 1873, also granted the Company complete corporate sovereignty over Samaná Bay and the surrounding land.

Following the signing of the agreement, American investment increased significantly in the Dominican Republic, and there was an influx of planters of both sugar and tobacco from the United States, Cuba, and Puerto Rico, and sugar production especially increased dramatically.

In January 1874, however, President Buenaventura Báez was overthrown, and the new government under Ignacio María González subsequently cancelled the concession and seized the Company's assets due to the Company's non-payment of their $150,000 annual lease (equivalent to $4,031,250 in 2025).
