= Antoine Pierrot =

Haitian army general

Gen. Antoine Pierrot
- Born: Antoine Pierrot; Hispaniola
- Died: December 22, 1855; San Juan, Dominican Republic
- Military career
- Allegiance: Haiti
- Branch: Haitian Army
- Rank: General
- Conflicts: Dominican War of Independence; Battle of Santomé

General Antoine Pierrot was a high-ranking Haitian military figure who was killed in combat at the Battle of Santomé during the Dominican War of Independence.

== Early life ==
Antoine Pierrot was born on the island of Hispaniola.

During the Second Empire of Haiti, Pierrot was a general in the Haitian Army. In the 1850s, he was given the honorary title of Duke of Tiburon by Haitian Emperor Faustin Soulouque.

== Dominican War of Independence ==
=== Battle of Santomé ===
When Emperor Faustin I initiated a third invasion attempt of the Dominican Republic, Antoine Pierrot led the Haitian Army against the Dominican troops of General José María Cabral at the Battle of Santomé. The battle was fought on December 22, 1855, in the province of San Juan. Over 600 Haitian soldiers perished in the battle including the general, and the rest were forced to retreat.

== Death ==
Antoine Pierrot died on December 22, 1855, after being killed in combat by Dominican forces, in the province of San Juan.

== See also ==
- Second Empire of Haiti
- Dominican War of Independence
- Battle of Santomé
