= San Juan de la Maguana =

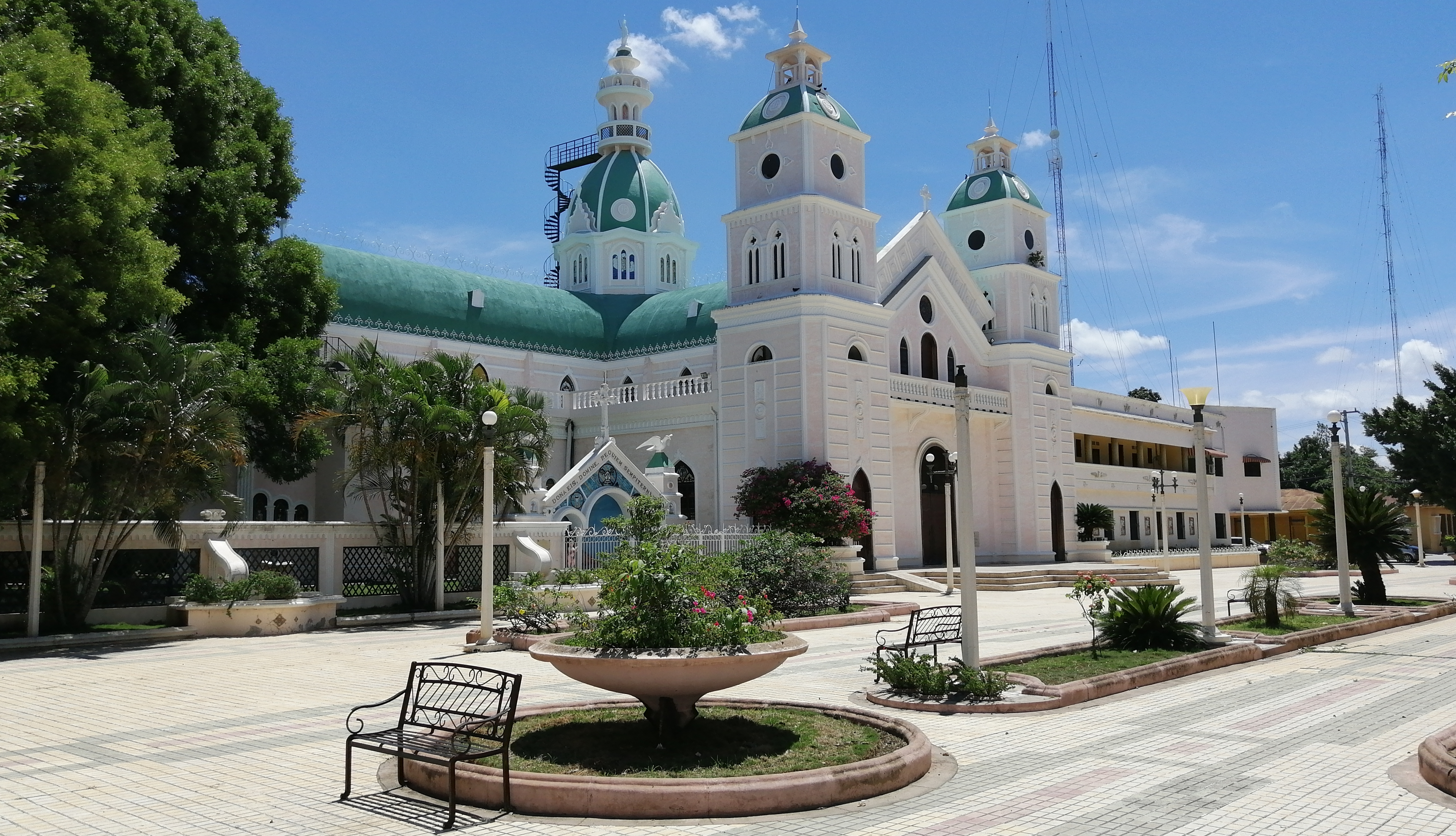
- Cathedral of San Juan de la Maguana, Dominican Republic

- Flag

- San Juan de la Maguana in the Dominican Republic
- Coordinates: 18°48′36″N 71°13′48″W
- Country: Dominican Republic
- Province: San Juan
- Founded: 1503; 1733

Area
  - Total: 1,876.21 km^{2} (724.41 sq mi)
- Elevation: 415 m (1,362 ft)

Population (2012)
  - Total: 169,032
  - Density: 90.0923/km^{2} (233.338/sq mi)
  - Demonym: Sanjuanero(a)
- Distance to – Santo Domingo: 200 km
- Municipal Districts: 9

San Juan de la Maguana is a city and municipality in the western region of the Dominican Republic and capital of the San Juan province. It was one of the first cities established on the island; founded in 1503, it was given the name of "San Juan de la Maguana" by San Juan Bautista, with Maguana being the Taíno name of the valley. The term Maguana means "the first stone, the unique stone".

== Geography ==
San Juan de la Maguana is in the center of the Valley of San Juan with the Central ("Cordillera Central") mountain range to the north and east, and the Sierra de Neiba to the south. To the west, there is a range of low hills. The San Juan River is the main river of the region, and the city was founded on the eastern side of this river.

== History ==
San Juan de la Maguana is one of the oldest cities in the Dominican Republic. It occupies the same valley where the chiefdom seat had Maguana and the historic "Corral of the Indians". Their leader and warlord was Caonabo (which in Taíno means "great lord of the earth"), who led one of the most notable battles against the Spanish colonizers.

In 1494, conquistador Alonso de Ojeda captured Caonabo in a ruse. The leader's town later became the site of San Juan de la Maguana, founded by Rodrigo Mejia Trillo.

San Juan de la Maguana was founded in 1503 by conquistador Diego Velázquez de Cuéllar following the Jaragua Massacre. However, the town experienced little growth; it was largely depopulated by 1574 and abandoned by 1605 as part of the Devastations of Osorio.

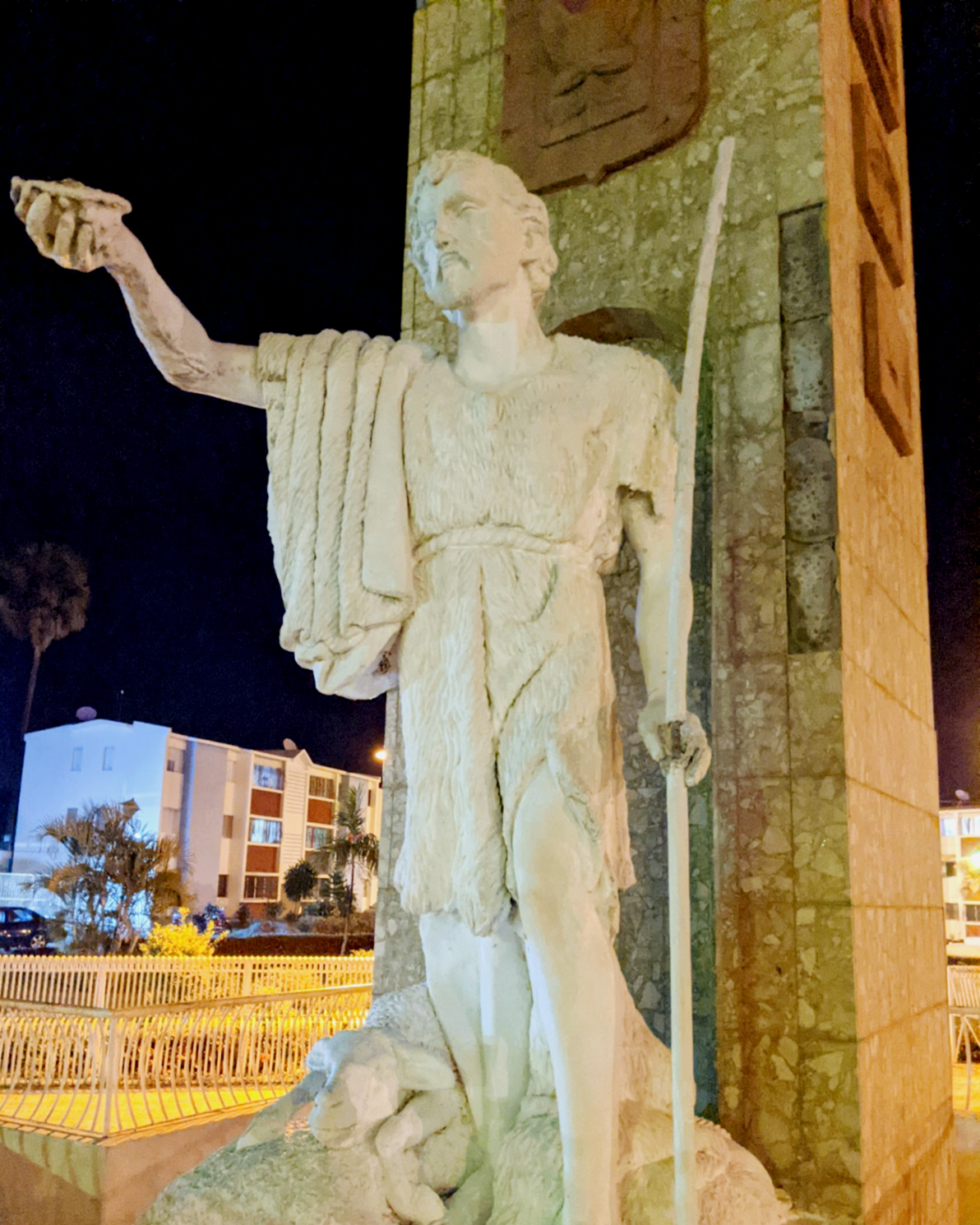
San Juan province statue.

Starting in the late 17th century, the San Juan valley began to be inhabited again by colonists from other settlements as well as the Canary Islands. In 1733, the town of San Juan was founded once more, close to the site of the original settlement. The town grew steadily during the 18th century, with a population of 1,851 according to a census done in 1777; of those people, 1,223 were free and 618 were enslaved. Like many towns in the region at the time, the primary economic activity was cattle ranching. The town exported hundreds of cattle to the neighboring French colony of Saint-Domingue, surpassed in volume only by the towns of Hincha (now part of Haiti as Hinche) and El Seibo.

San Juan was temporarily ruled by the French when the Spanish colony was ceded to France under the Peace of Basel in 1795. It returned to Spanish jurisdiction in 1809 following the Spanish reconquest of Santo Domingo. In 1820, President of Haiti Jean-Pierre Boyer sent Dézir Dalmassi to San Juan and other cities to amass support for the incoming annexation. In 1821, San Juan became part of the short-lived Republic of Spanish Haiti, which would later be annexed by the Republic of Haiti (1820–1849) the following year. During this time, the city was known as Saint-Jean de la Maguâna and was part of the department of Ozama in the Haitian state.

The eastern part of Hispaniola declared independence as the Dominican Republic on February 27, 1844, and San Juan became part of the Azua Province. Haitian forces would attempt to recapture the east in a 12-year war; one of these battles, the Battle of Santomé, took place close to San Juan. Dominican forces prevailed and San Juan and surrounding areas remained a part of the Dominican Republic.

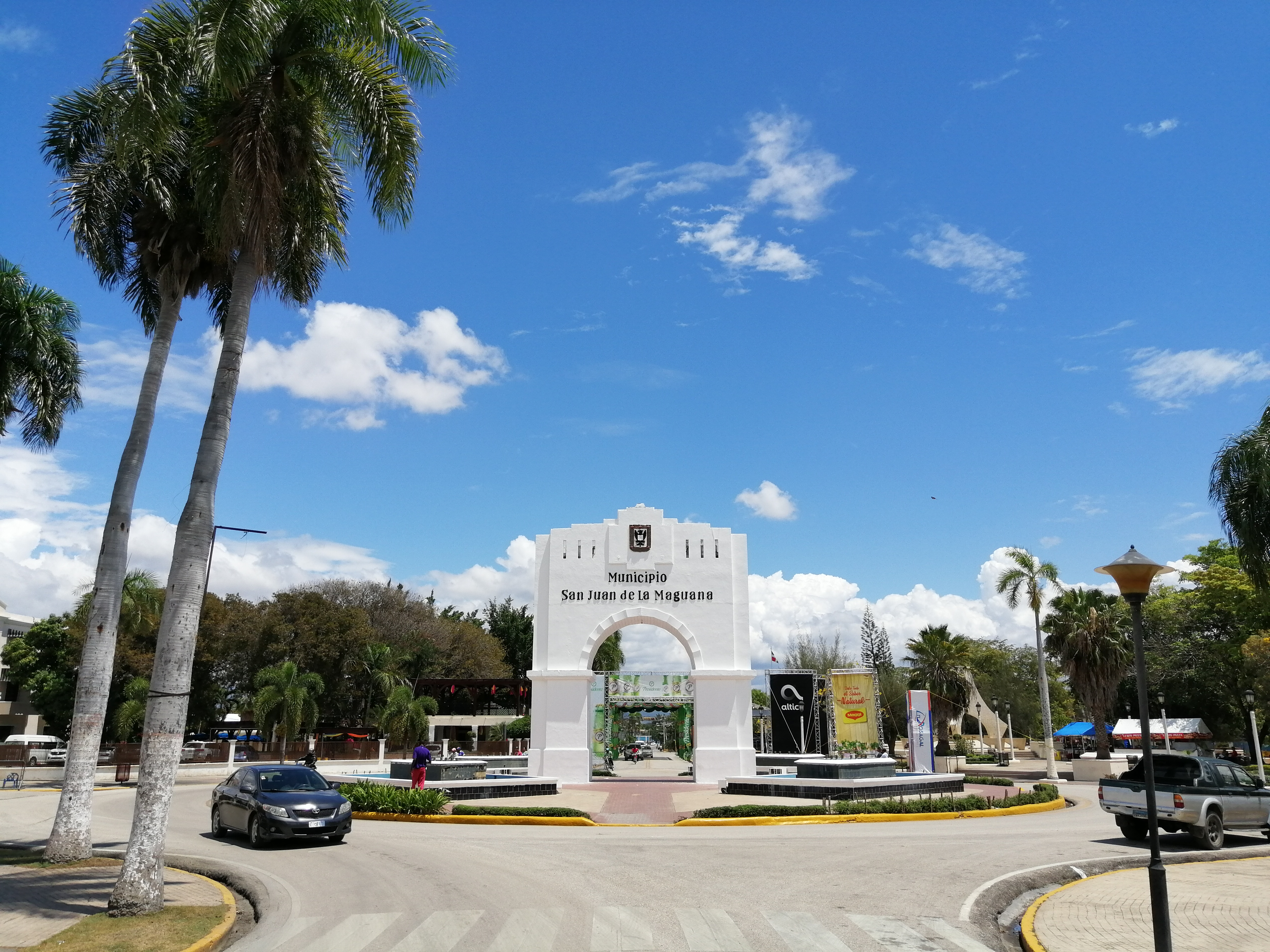
Arco de Triunfo

Since its inception, San Juan flourished due to its fertile lands and climate. A diverse range of fruits were grown in the town; the exploitation of sugarcane as a commercial item of importance was the main source for the employment of labor. San Juan possessed in principle four "mills" for the exploitation of cane. The first of these mills was installed in the center of town.

== Economy ==
The main economic activities in the province are livestock and agriculture; as it has been since the since colonial times thanks to the fertile soil and climate which is suitable for cultivation of cereals and legumes such as beans, rice, corn, peanuts, pigeon peas, and sorghum.

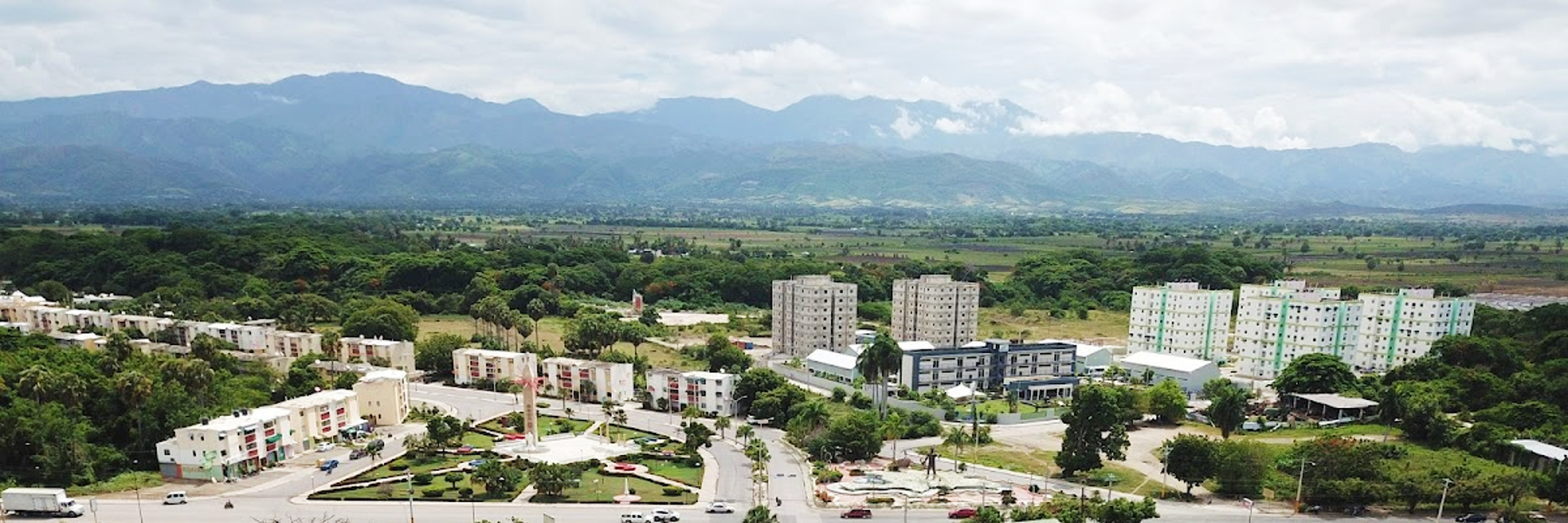
San Juan residential buildings panoramic view

== Culture ==
The patron saint festivities of San Juan de la Maguana are celebrated on June 24 of each year, the day of San Juan Bautista. San Juan is known on the island for hosting a diversity of cultural traditions. It is known as "Fiesta de palos", which is a ritual done from time to time in the municipality. Figures are made to which magical powers are attributed, called Witches of San Juan.

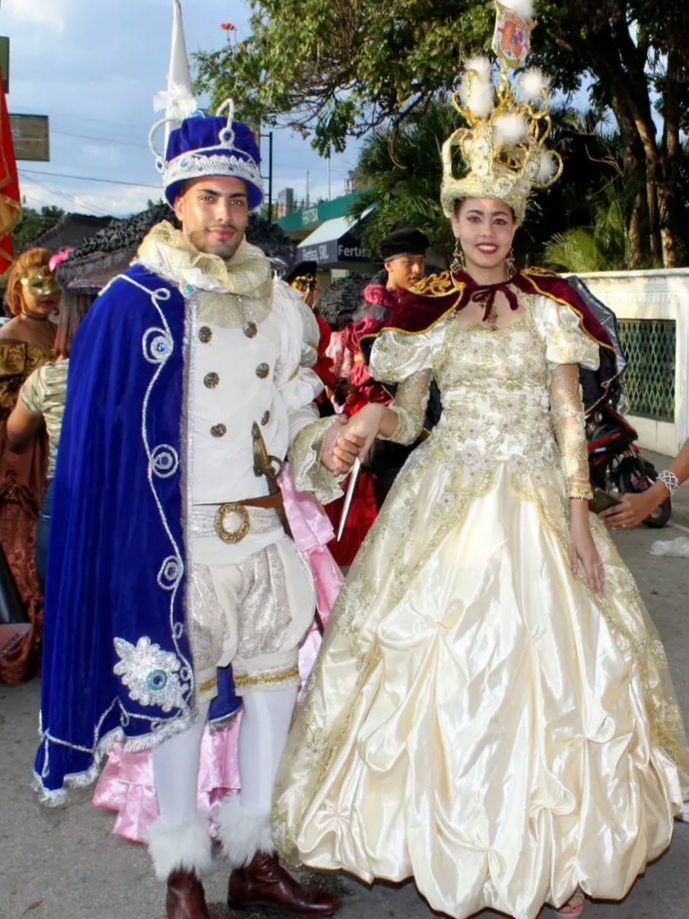
People in carnival of San Juan de la Maguana, Dominican Republic.

In addition, evangelical Christianity has gained a significant presence in the local community, being one of the most growing religious communities in recent years composed mostly of young people. There is also the presence of Jehovah's Witnesses, members of the Church of Jesus Christ of Latter-day Saints, and other religious denominations related to Christianity.

== Climate ==
Owing to its location in a sheltered basin, San Juan de la Maguana has a relatively dry tropical savanna climate (Köppen Aw). Maxima are hot year-round, although the city’s moderate altitude lessens humidity somewhat and cools the mornings by around 4 to 5 °C (7 to 9 °F). There is a very pronounced dry season from December to March, when only 76.9 millimetres or 3.03 inches of rain can be expected, and a moderate wet season covering the remainder of the year

Climate data for San Juan de la Maguana (1961–1990)
Month	Jan	Feb	Mar	Apr	May	Jun	Jul	Aug	Sep	Oct	Nov	Dec	Year
Record high °C (°F)	33.9 (93.0)	35.5 (95.9)	36.8 (98.2)	36.2 (97.2)	36.2 (97.2)	37.0 (98.6)	39.0 (102.2)	37.5 (99.5)	37.5 (99.5)	36.9 (98.4)	35.0 (95.0)	33.5 (92.3)	39.0 (102.2)
Mean daily maximum °C (°F)	29.6 (85.3)	30.4 (86.7)	31.4 (88.5)	31.5 (88.7)	31.0 (87.8)	31.8 (89.2)	32.7 (90.9)	32.7 (90.9)	32.2 (90.0)	31.0 (87.8)	30.1 (86.2)	29.6 (85.3)	31.2 (88.2)
Daily mean °C (°F)	22.45 (72.41)	23.25 (73.85)	24.4 (75.9)	25.2 (77.4)	25.45 (77.81)	25.95 (78.71)	26.15 (79.07)	26.25 (79.25)	26 (79)	25.25 (77.45)	24.1 (75.4)	22.75 (72.95)	24.77 (76.60)
Mean daily minimum °C (°F)	15.3 (59.5)	16.1 (61.0)	17.4 (63.3)	18.9 (66.0)	19.9 (67.8)	20.1 (68.2)	19.6 (67.3)	19.8 (67.6)	19.8 (67.6)	19.5 (67.1)	18.1 (64.6)	15.9 (60.6)	18.4 (65.1)
Record low °C (°F)	8.5 (47.3)	8.7 (47.7)	9.4 (48.9)	11.8 (53.2)	13.7 (56.7)	15.6 (60.1)	13.5 (56.3)	15.5 (59.9)	13.5 (56.3)	14.0 (57.2)	10.1 (50.2)	7.2 (45.0)	7.2 (45.0)
Average rainfall mm (inches)	12.1 (0.48)	15.4 (0.61)	31.2 (1.23)	69.3 (2.73)	141.5 (5.57)	90.2 (3.55)	108.3 (4.26)	128.2 (5.05)	148.4 (5.84)	134.7 (5.30)	53.1 (2.09)	18.2 (0.72)	950.6 (37.43)
Average rainy days (≥ 1.0 mm)	1.5	1.8	3.1	5.9	9.7	7.9	7.7	8.9	10.3	10.8	4.8	1.5	73.9
Average relative humidity (%)	70.1	68.5	67.3	69.5	73.3	72.0	69.8	70.2	72.3	75.4	73.8	71.3	71.1
Source 1: NOAA
Source 2: Daily mean calculated using maximum and minimum temperatures

== Demographics ==
According to the 2012 Population and Housing Census, the municipality had a total population of 169,032. The urban population of the municipality was 60.10%. These population data include the populations of the municipal districts.

== Notable people ==
- Sandy Alcantara, Major League Baseball pitcher
- Jean Segura, Major League Baseball Player
- Francisco Alberto Caamaño, Expresident of the Dominican Republic
- Ramón Mateo, Chess grandmaster
- Danilo Medina, Expresident of the Dominican Republic
- Jose Joaquin Puello, Dominican revolutionary and military general
- Manuela Rodríguez Aybar (c. 1790 - 1850), poet
