= Jane Cazneau =

American journalist, lobbyist, publicist

Jane Maria Eliza Cazneau (née McManus, widowed Storm; April 6, 1807 – December 12, 1878) was an Irish-American journalist, lobbyist, and publicist who advocated the annexation of all of Mexico during the Mexican–American War.

== Education and early career ==
Cazneau was born on April 6, 1807, in Brunswick, Rensselaer County, New York, the daughter of Congressman William McManus and Catharine (Coons) McManus. She attended Troy Female Seminary, one of the earliest colleges for women, but did not graduate. On August 22, 1825, she married Allen B. Storm. They separated in 1831, and Allen Storm died 1838 in New York City. Their son, William Mont Storm (b. August 2, 1826), became an inventor whose first invention was patented on Feb. 4, 1851 for an "Improved method of obtaining motive power". He had at least 33 patents to his name, with most in firearms, but many other devices as well.

In 1832, Jane's father ventured into land speculation, and was one of the founders of the Galveston Bay and Texas Land Company, and Jane and her brother Robert traveled to Texas, which was then still part of Mexico, to buy land. The next year, Jane, her father, her brother Robert and a company of German settlers set out to take possession of the land, but the scheme failed when the German settlers refused to go beyond Matagorda. She returned home with her father to Brunswick, New York. Her brother Robert remained in Texas and eventually became a wealthy planter.

Also at this time, Eliza Jumel named her as co-respondent in her divorce suit with Aaron Burr, alleging an affair in addition to his ruinous attempt at land speculation.

== Writing ==
Cazneau later turned to journalism, working for Horace Greeley's New-York Tribune, and Moses Yale Beach's New York Sun and the Democratic Review, strongly advocating manifest destiny. Cazneau embraced this with enthusiasm, and was to go on to be a firm believer in the expansion of the South and of slavery into Central America and the Caribbean. In Mistress of Manifest Destiny (2001), Linda S. Hudson argued that it was Cazneau who actually wrote the "Annexation" editorial, and thus coined the phrase "Manifest Destiny". Since many editorials in John L. O'Sullivan's publications were unsigned, Hudson used computer-aided "textual analysis" to support her argument. O'Sullivan biographer Robert D. Sampson disputes Hudson's claim for a variety of reasons.

== Mexican–American War and peace ==
Cazneau was sent by President James K. Polk on a secret peace mission to Mexico in 1845; she rode there on horseback. With the outbreak of the Mexican–American War, she went to the front, where she witnessed Winfield Scott's capture of the fortress of Vera Cruz in March 1847. She was the first female war correspondent in American history, and used the pseudonym "Cora Montgomery" in her writing about the war. She helped negotiate the Treaty of Guadalupe-Hidalgo (1848), which included guarantees of property rights to both male and female nonresident landowners. While in Mexico, she worked on canal-building expeditions and banking projects. At the end of the Mexican–American War she turned her attention to Cuba, and the potential it represented, advocating for its annexation and denouncing its Spanish colonial overlords. She later settled at Eagle Pass, a frontier village three hundred miles up the Rio Grande from the Gulf of Mexico, and got to know many of the local Indian chiefs.

== Caribbean ==
In 1849, she married William Leslie Cazneau. They moved to the Dominican Republic in 1855. Despite her earlier sympathies for southern expansionism she disapproved of secession, and was hired by William H. Seward, President Abraham Lincoln's Secretary of State, to write denunciations of the Confederacy. To her, the war was a serious interruption to further prospects of American expansion in the Caribbean.

In 1878, she drowned on her way to Santo Domingo, after the steamer Emily B. Souder on which she was travelling was caught in a storm. Only two men survived the shipwreck.
