= Manuela Rodríguez Aybar =

Dominican poet

- Born: 1790; San Juan de la Maguana
- Died: 1850 (aged 59–60); Santo Domingo
- Occupation: Writer, poet, editor

Manuela Rodríguez Aybar (c. 1790 - 1850) was a poet and essayist from the Dominican Republic. Known as "La Deana", she self-published poems and the autobiographical and political essay Historia de una mujer (History of a Woman, 1849).

Manuela Rodríguez Aybar was born on 1790 in San Juan de la Maguana. Her mother was Maria Rodríguez. Many of the details of her life, including the name of her father, are unknown. She lived with her godfather, José Gabriel Aybar, the dean of the Cathedral of Santo Domingo, the source of her nickname "La Deana".

Rodríguez Aybar self-published her work, mostly décimas and other poems, using a hand-cranked printing press that is thought to be the first privately owned printing press in the Dominican Republic. She distributed her work in the form of leaflets and pamphlets to the masons rebuilding colonial fortifications in Santo Domingo and other working class people. Many of these works have not survived. She is thought to have printed La Miscelánea, clandestine political newspaper published around 1821, and in 1843 edited La Chicharra, a long-running leaflet.

She was a stalwart, outspoken supporter of President Pedro Santana, and Santana's negative historical reputation is thought to be why her work has fallen into obscurity. Santana's rival, President Manuel Jimenes, attempted to imprison and execute Rodríguez Aybar. She fled to the home of Jonathan Elliot, a United States commercial agent, and there she wrote Historia de una mujer, which discusses her political and feminist views regarding the role of government and the place of women in the Dominican Republic.

Manuela Rodríguez Aybar died in 1850 in Santo Domingo.
