= 1874 Nevada gubernatorial election =

- November 3, 1874

Nominee	Lewis R. Bradley	J. C. Hazlett
Party	Democratic	Republican
Popular vote	10,310	7,785
Percentage	56.98%	43.02%
- County results Bradley: 50–60% 60–70% 70–80% Hazlett: 50–60% No Data/Vote
Governor before election
Lewis R. Bradley
Democratic
Elected Governor
Lewis R. Bradley
Democratic

The 1874 Nevada gubernatorial election was held on November 3, 1874, in order to elect the Governor of Nevada. The incumbent Democratic Governor of Nevada Lewis R. Bradley won re-election against Republican nominee and Nevada State Senator John Clark Hazlett.

== General election ==
On election day, November 3, 1874, incumbent Democratic Governor of Nevada Lewis R. Bradley won the election by a margin of 2,525 votes against his opponent Republican nominee John Clark Hazlett, thereby retaining Democratic control over the office of Governor. Bradley was sworn in for his second term on January 3, 1875.

=== Results ===
Nevada gubernatorial election, 1874
Party	Candidate	Votes	%	±%
Democratic	Lewis R. Bradley (incumbent)	10,310	56.98%	+3.04%
Republican	J. C. Hazlett	7,785	43.02%	−3.04%
Majority		2,525	13.96%	
Total votes		18,095	100.00%	
Democratic hold		Swing	+6.08%	

=== Results by county ===
County	Lewis R. Bradley Democratic		J. C. Hazlett Republican		Margin		Total votes cast
County	#	%	#	%	#	%	Total votes cast
Churchill	43	78.18%	12	21.82%	31	56.36%	55
Douglas	273	52.50%	247	47.50%	26	5.00%	520
Elko	884	67.07%	434	32.93%	450	34.14%	1,318
Esmeralda	372	66.43%	188	33.57%	184	32.86%	560
Eureka	794	50.54%	777	49.46%	17	1.08%	1,571
Humboldt	580	66.21%	296	33.79%	284	32.42%	876
Lander	368	45.60%	439	54.40%	-71	-8.80%	807
Lincoln	888	65.29%	472	34.71%	416	30.59%	1,360
Lyon	373	48.82%	391	51.18%	-18	-2.36%	764
Nye	577	59.00%	401	41.00%	176	18.00%	978
Ormsby	498	42.97%	661	57.03%	-163	-14.06%	1,159
Storey	3,433	57.49%	2,538	42.51%	895	14.99%	5,971
Washoe	687	62.68%	409	37.32%	278	25.36%	1,096
White Pine	540	50.94%	520	49.06%	20	1.89%	1,060
Totals	10,310	56.98%	7,785	43.02%	2,525	13.95%	18,095

==== Counties that flipped from Republican to Democratic ====
- White Pine

==== Counties that flipped from Democratic to Republican ====
- Lander
- Ormsby
