= Manuel Altagracia Cáceres =

Dominican Republic politician (1838–1878)

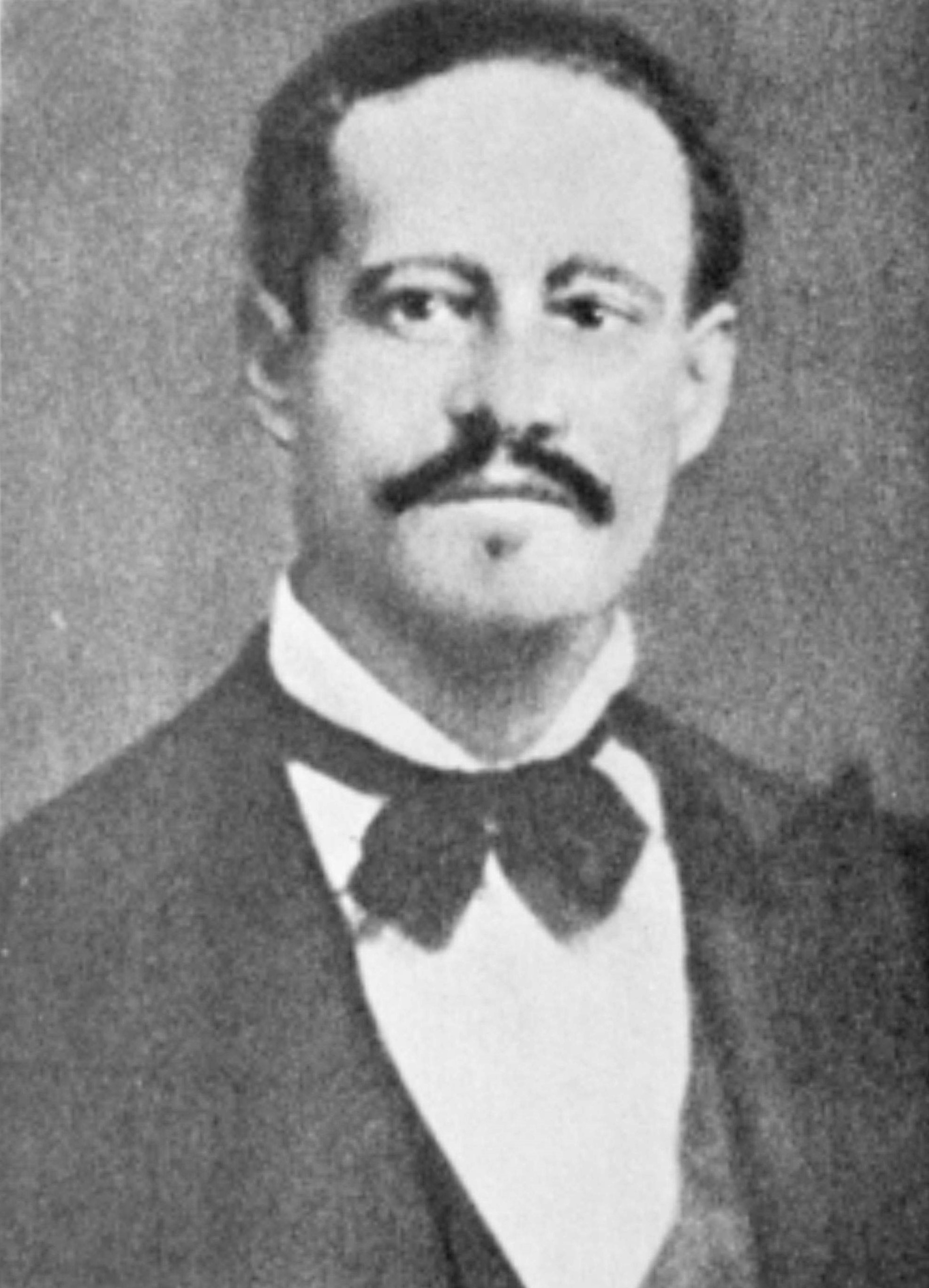
Manuel Altagracia Cáceres

Manuel Altagracia Cáceres y Fernández, sometimes called Memé (1838 in Azua – 1878) was a Dominican politician who briefly served as 17th President of the Dominican Republic from January 31, 1868 until February 13, 1868. He also served as General-In-Chief of the Dominican Republic.

== Biography ==
He was born in the city of Azua in 1838, during the years of the Haitian occupation.

A supporter of President Buenaventura Báez, he fought the rebels during the revolution of July 1857, which earned him accusations of conspiracy. An annexationist, he approved the Law of Annexation by Spain in 1861, but fought alongside President Pepillo Salcedo during the Dominican Restoration War of 1863.

In 1867, he was again a supporter of Báez and participated in the coup d'état against the government of José María Cabral. In 1868 he briefly held the position of president of the Dominican Republic for one brief month. After Báez returned to power in May, he entered the presidential cabinet. In 1871, he participated in a coup against Báez with Ignacio María González, who became president. A few months later, he attempted to depose González, but failed and was exiled to Puerto Rico.

After the fall of the government in 1876, he returned to the Dominican Republic and led an armed movement against Ulises Francisco Espaillat. Captured, he was exiled again. In December 1876, he returned to the country and became Minister of Finance in the new government of Buenaventura Báez. This government was overthrown by González in 1878. When elections were scheduled for September, he was assassinated on the orders of Ulises Heureaux.

His son, Ramón Cáceres, avenged him by assassinating Heureaux in 1899.

== See also ==
- Buenaventura Báez
- Ulises Heureaux
- Ramón Cáceres

Political offices
Preceded by José María Cabral	President of the Dominican Republic; 1868	Succeeded by Junta of Generals
