= Ignacio María González (politician) =

18th, 20th, 23rd and 25th President of the Dominican Republic (1838–1915)

Ignacio María González Santín
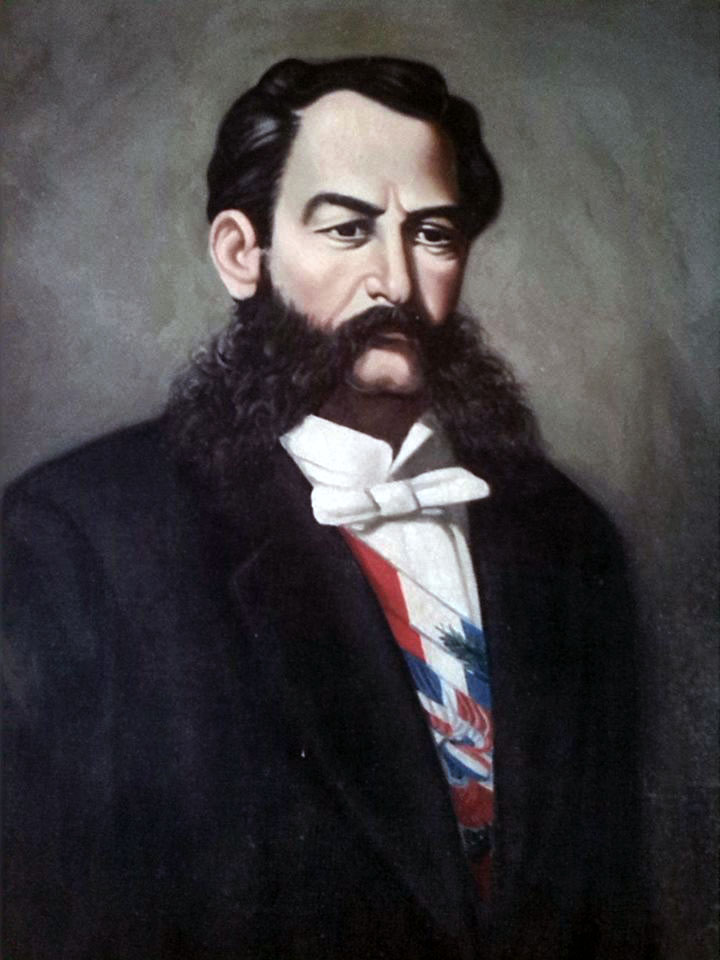
- Painting of Ignacio María Gonzalez as President of the Dominican Republic

18th President of the Dominican Republic
- In office January 2, 1874 – January 22, 1874
- Preceded by: Buenaventura Báez
- Succeeded by: Ulises Francisco Espaillat

20th President of the Dominican Republic
- In office January 22, 1874 – April 6, 1874
- Preceded by: Ignacio María González
- Succeeded by: Ignacio María González

14th President of the Dominican Republic
- In office April 6, 1874 – February 23, 1876
- Preceded by: Generals-in-Chief: Ignacio María González; Manuel Altagracia Cáceres
- Succeeded by: Council of Secretaries of State

3rd Supreme Chief of the Dominican Republic
- In office November 11, 1876 – December 9, 1876
- Preceded by: Superior Governing Junta
- Succeeded by: Marcos Antonio Cabral

18th President of the Dominican Republic
- In office July 6, 1878 – September 2, 1878
- Preceded by: Cesareo Guillermo
- Succeeded by: People's Military Chiefs

Personal details
- Born: January 26, 1838 Saint-Domingue (now Santo Domingo), Ozama Department, Island of Haiti (now in the Dominican Republic)
- Died: February 8, 1915 (aged 77) Santo Domingo, Santo Domingo Province (now "Distrito Nacional"), Dominican Republic
- Party: Green Party
- Spouse: Dolores Roselló Miret

Ignacio María González (January 26, 1838 – February 8, 1915) was a politician from the Dominican Republic who was President of the Dominican Republic from 1873 to February 1876, November 1876 to December 1876, March 1878 to May 1878, and July 1878 to September 1878. He was liberal.

== Birth and early career ==
González was born in the city of Santo Domingo in 1838, during the Haitian occupation of Santo Domingo.

Once the annexation to Spain was concluded following the Dominican Restoration War, he devoted himself fully to politics, joining the party of Buenaventura Báez, in whose six-year regime he was inspector of Customs and governor of Puerto Plata. His actions in that position earned him a good reputation. When the project to incorporate the Dominican Republic into the United States failed, Báez sent him to that country with the mission of ordering the printing of ballots and the minting of copper coins. In 1873, when the President began to lose political control due to the size of the public debt, González, anticipating the imminent triumph of the liberal or blue revolution, declared against his boss, leading the so-called Unionist Movement. February of that year. Appointed leader of the movement, he went to the capital, where with the mediation of foreign consuls he negotiated the capitulation of Báez, who resigned on January 2, 1874, subsequently abandoning the country. Master of the situation, González issued a decree by which he prohibited the entry into the Republic of the restoration and anti-Baecista hero Gregorio Luperón and the former presidents Pedro Antonio Pimentel and José María Cabral, until the constitutional Government was installed. The elections were held in February and González won.

== Presidency ==
His Government initially enjoyed great popularity. He terminated the contract that Báez had concluded with the Samana Bay Company, signed a treaty of peace, friendship, trade and navigation with the Haitian president Michel Domingue, and granted licenses to foreign companies for the production of textiles, soaps, chocolate, coffee and other agricultural sectors. However, on the political level he did not govern in accordance with the postulates of the Unionist Movement, which is why the Baecistas dedicated themselves to conspiring to impose Manuel Altagracia Cáceres as President, who spoke out against him in Santiago.

González headed to Cibao at the head of his troops to fight him and, with the support of the liberals, who did not want to return to the times of Báez, defeated the insurgents. Then, believing that the frustrated uprising of Cáceres was due to his condescending policy, he accepted the advice of his supporters and proclaimed himself Supreme Leader of the Nation by the will of the People, calling a Constituent Assembly to modify the Magna Carta for not conforming to the circumstances of the country. The new Constitution was promulgated in March 1875.

From that moment on, González's autocratic actions distanced him from the blues, a distance that increased when he refused to recognize as public debt the debts that Luperón had incurred during his fight against Báez. The Santiago liberals restructured their party under a new patriotic association called the Peace League and in February 1876 prepared to overthrow González, whom they accused of violating the Constitution, becoming a dictator, and embezzling public funds. Since no one wanted a new civil war, the blues and Baecistas or reds reached an agreement through which Congress would desist from hearing about these accusations in exchange for González's resignation, which he made effective immediately. At Luperón's initiative, the blues proposed Ulises Francisco Espaillat, a restaurateur leader, as a presidential candidate, who was elected on March 24. He soon found himself forced to confront the revolutionary movements that emerged in the north and south led by González and General Marcos Antonio Cabral, who rose up in the name of Báez. Even when Espaillat declared a state of siege throughout the country and appointed Luperón Minister of War and Navy, González arrived at the gates of the capital on October 5 and on December 20, the President resigned, taking refuge in the French consulate.

== Fall from power ==
Dissatisfied with the resignation, the Reds surrounded the city of Santo Domingo, forcing González to resign, after which they called Báez, who took possession of the Presidency for the fifth time on December 27. His government lasted 14 months, during which he again unsuccessfully managed the annexation of the Dominican Republic to the United States. The blues grouped together under the leadership of Father Fernando Arturo de Meriño and at the beginning of 1878 they revolted against Báez. After his departure, two governments were formed: one in the capital headed by Cesáreo Guillermo and the other in Santiago headed by González. Faced with the danger that a new fratricidal conflict would break out, the blues agreed with González to occupy the Presidency on the condition that he appoint some of his own people to various ministries. González accepted and on June 25 he regained power, but a few weeks later he failed to fulfill his promise and ordered Luperón's arrest.

In view of what happened, the liberals revolted and González surrendered on September 2. Jacinto de Castro, president of the Supreme Court of Justice, was in charge of the provisional Government until new elections were held. Guillermo, who had besieged the capital, maneuvered to get himself elected at the end of 1879 and Luperón left for Europe.

== Minister of Foreign Affairs ==
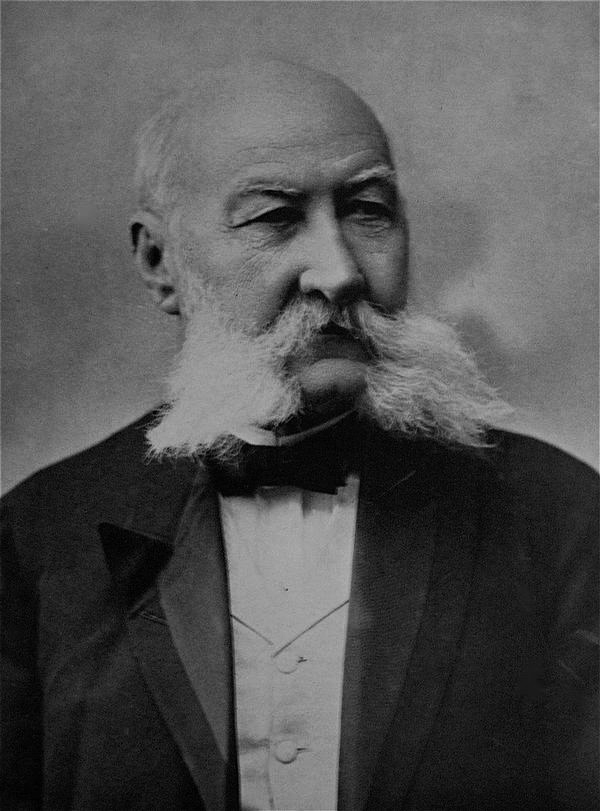
Photograph of Ignacio María González in 1907 during the government of Ramón Cáceres

During the governments of Luperón and Meriño, González stayed away from politics, but Heureaux appointed him Minister of Foreign Affairs in his various presidential terms. As an old man, he protested, as a senator, the election in 1912 of Eladio Victoria Victoria as president of the Republic. He died three years later at the age 77 on February 8, 1915.

== See also ==
- Buenaventura Báez
- Ulises Francisco Espaillat
- Gregorio Luperón

Political offices
Preceded by Generals-in-Chief	President of the Dominican Republic; 1874-1876	Succeeded by Council of Secretaries of State
Preceded by Cesareo Guillermo	President of the Dominican Republic; 1878	Succeeded by People's Military Chiefs
