= Battle of Santomé =

1855 battle of the Dominican War of Independence

- Part of the Dominican War of Independence
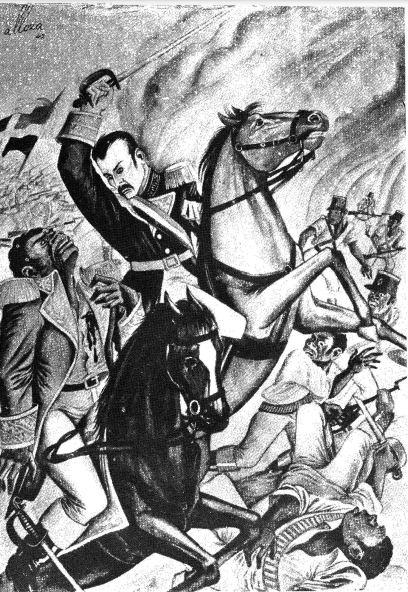
- Illustration of General José María Cabral in the Battle of Santomé by José Alloza c. 1979
Date	22 December 1855; 168 years ago
Location	Savannah of Santomé, San Juan Province
Result	Dominican victory

Belligerents
Dominican Republic	Haiti

Commanders and leaders
(Dominican Republic) José María Cabral	(Second Empire of Haiti) Antoine Pierrot †

Strength
4,500	12,000

Casualties and losses
Moderate	695 killed, many wounded

The Battle of Santomé (Spanish: Batalla de Santomé) was a major battle during the years after the Dominican War of Independence and was fought on 22 December 1855, in the province of San Juan. A detachment of Dominican troops forming part of the Army of the South, led by General José María Cabral, defeated an outnumbering Haitian force led by Antoine Pierrot. Almost 700 Haitian soldiers perished in the battle, and the rest, many of them wounded, were forced to retreat, being pushed back as far as the Fortress of Cachimán and subsequently beyond the border. The Haitians met defeat on the same day at the Battle of Cambronal.
