= William Leslie Cazneau =

American pioneer (1807–1876)

William Leslie Cazneau (October 5, 1807 – January 7, 1876) was a Texas pioneer who is credited with having buried the Alamo Heroes with full military honors.

William Leslie Cazneau was born in Boston, Massachusetts, on October 5, 1807. In 1839, he moved to Texas and established a general merchandise business. Appointed on the staff of Thomas J. Chambers in 1835, he served until the Texas Army disbanded. He was dispatched to the United States to raise men and supplies. He was assigned the burial of the remains of the Alamo heroes, as well as the guarding of Mexican prisoners on Galveston Island. He moved to Austin in 1839 and was appointed Commissary General by then-Texas President Mirabeau B. Lamar.

An influential figure in Texas politics, Cazneau represented Travis County in the Seventh, Eighth, and Ninth Congresses, in the Convention of 1845, and in the inaugural Texas state legislature. He served during the Mexican-American War until August 1847, when he entered into partnership with Henry Lawrence Kinney. In 1850, after his marriage to Jane McManus, he established the townsite of Eagle Pass to extend his trading enterprises into Mexico.

Under the patronage of James Buchanan, Cazneau was twice appointed special agent to the Dominican Republic in 1853 and 1859. In 1856, he contracted to furnish one thousand colonists to William Walker in Nicaragua. In 1861, he partnered with Joseph W. Fabens to colonize formerly enslaved people in Santo Domingo and later was involved in other equally unsuccessful endeavors. He continued to make his home in the West Indies except for brief intervals until his death at his Jamaica estate on January 7, 1876. José Gabriel García termed him a "tenacious adventurer."

Cazneau's wife, Jane Cazneau, was lost at sea while traveling to Jamaica to recover his body.
