= List of Dominican painters =

The following list of painters from the Dominican Republic (in alphabetical order by last name) includes painters of various genres, who are notable and are either born in Dominican Republic, of Dominican descent, or who produce works that are primarily about the Dominican Republic.

== A ==
- Oscar Abreu (born 1978), painter, sculptor, and performance artist
- Juan Andújar (born 1984), painter

== B ==
- Cándido Bidó (1936–2011), Santo Domingo-born painter
- Alejandro Bonilla (1820–1901), painter and teacher born in Santo Domingo, considered one of the fathers of the national Dominican pictorial tradition

== C ==
- Jaime Colson (1901–1975), Modernist painter, writer, and playwright; born in Puerto Plata
- José García Cordero (born 1951), Dominican-born French painter

== D ==
- Luis Desangles (1861–1940), painter, sculptor, and educator

== G ==
- Zenobia Galar (born 1958), painter
- Adolfo García Obregón (1865–1931), painter, illustrator, educator, and critic
- Enrique García-Godoy (1886–1947), painter and journalist
- Scherezade García (born 1966), Dominican-born American painter, printmaker, and installation artist
- Paul Giudicelli (1921–1965), abstract painter
- Aurelio Grisanty (born 1949), Dominican-born American painter, graphic artist, muralist, set designer, costume designer
- Arturo Grullón (1869–1942) painter, ophthalmologist, and educator
- Hulda Guzmán (born 1964), figurative painter

== H ==
- Gilberto Hernández Ortega (1923–1979), painter
- Diego José Hilaris, painter during the colonial period

== L ==
- Kamalky Laureano (1983), painter
- Clara Ledesma (1924–1999), Dominican-born American painter

== M ==
- Yoryi Morel (1906–1979), painter, musician, and teacher

== N ==
- Leopoldo Navarro (1862–1908), painter, educator, mathematician, and sculptor
- Elsa Núñez (born 1943), abstract artist, painter; born in Santo Domingo

== P ==
- Raquel Paiewonsky (born 1969), Dominican painter of Lithuanian descent
- Olivia Peguero (born 1961), Dominican-born American contemporary landscape and botanical artist
- Fernando Peña Defilló (1926–2016), Dominican painter of Canarian descent and Catalan descent
- Guillo Pérez (1923–2014), painter
- Eligio Pichardo (1929–1984), Dominican-born American painter

== R ==
- Moses Ros (born 1958) Dominican-American architect, sculptor, painter, printmaker and muralist

== S ==
- Amaya Salazar (born 1951), painter
- Jorge Noceda Sánchez (1925–1987), surrealist painter, diplomat, and gastroeonerolgist
- Darío Suro (1917–1997), painter, art critic, and diplomat from La Vega, Dominican Republic

== T ==
- Rosa Tavarez (1939–2023), painter and engraver
- Edward Telleria (born 1974), painter

== U ==
- Alberto Ulloa (1950–2011), painter, sculptor, and poet from Altamira, Dominican Republic
- Abelardo Rodríguez Urdaneta (1870–1933), sculptor, photographer, painter, and educator
- Fernando Ureña Rib (1951–2013), Dominican-born painter

== V ==
- Francisco Velásquez, 18th and 19th-century painter during the colonial-era
- Miguel Vila Luna (1943–2005), architect and painter; born in Santiago

== W ==
- Delia Weber (1900–1982), painter, teacher, poet, film actress, and feminist
- Celeste Woss y Gil (1891–1985), painter, educator, and feminist activist

== See also ==
- Culture of the Dominican Republic
- List of artists from the Dominican Republic
- List of lists of painters by nationality
- List of people from the Dominican Republic
- List of Dominican Republic women artists
