= Clara Ledesma =

Dominican-American painter

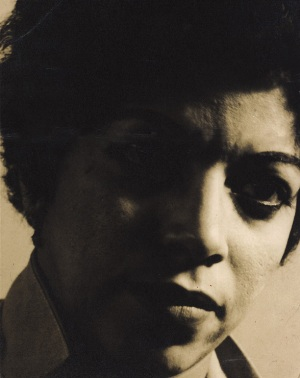
- Born: 5 March 1924; Santiago de los Caballeros, Dominican Republic
- Died: 25 May 1999 (aged 75); Jamaica, Queens, New York, U.S.
- Known for: Painting
- Spouse: Walter Terrazas

Untitled, 1960, oil on panel, Museo Bellapart (Santo Domingo, Dominican Republic)

Clara Ledesma Terrazas (5 March 1924 – 25 May 1999) was a Dominican-born American artist

== Early years and education ==
Born in Santiago de los Caballeros, she attended Escuela Ercilia Pepín and in her teenage years studied art under Yoryi Morel at his self-named Academia Yoryi.

Ledesma later was one of the first women to enroll in — as well as graduate from — the National School of Fine Arts in Santo Domingo, graduating in 1948. There, her professors included Celeste Woss y Gil and George Hausdorf, while her primary mentor was painting professor Josep Gausachs. Fellow students included Gilberto Hernández Ortega and Eligio Pichardo. After graduating, she took a position teaching drawing at the same school.

== Career, continuing education and personal life ==
In 1949, Ledesma had her first solo exhibition at the Ateneo of San Pedro de Macorís. In 1951 she opened a combination studio and gallery, where she displayed her works as well as those of other artists. With the proceeds from a very successful solo exhibition in 1952, Ledesma traveled to Europe to further her education. She studied painting in Barcelona and Madrid, and exhibited her works in galleries in Spain. Ledesma also traveled to Lisbon and Paris to visit important museums. She was particularly influenced by the works of Marc Chagall, Joan Miró and Paul Klee. During her stay in Europe, Ledesma met Bolivian native artist Walter Terrazas, who returned to Santo Domingo with her in 1954.

"She studied painting at prestigious academies abroad and then returned to the country where she presented works that she had conducted in Europe under the influence of Miro, Chagall and Paul Klee, among others."

In Santo Domingo, she worked closely with other important Dominican artists, including Gilberto Hernández Ortega, Josep Gausachs and Jaime Colson. In 1955, she was named vice director of the National School of Fine Arts.

In 1961, Clara Ledesma and her husband moved to New York City, where she opened another gallery. She lived and worked there until her death in 1999.

=== Exhibitions and artwork ===
Ledesma had numerous international solo exhibitions, including events in Madrid, Mexico City and New York, and participated in group exhibitions in Brazil, Spain, Cuba, Haiti, Venezuela, Argentina and Puerto Rico.

Ledesma's paintings ranged in style from Expressionism and Surrealism to Abstraction. She is known for her use of brilliant colors, imaginative figures and the feeling of magic and mysticism created in her paintings and drawings. In 1955, journalist Horia Tanasescu described her work: "At times ironic, often playful, but taking great care in the production of her paintings, this artist introduces an enthusiasm for life to the national art scene that is in striking contrast to the solemnity of the majority of her fellow artists."

"Ledesma also touched on social realism in her work, with her most noted series underlining the racial inequities of the time.”

"She tried to represent native paintings, with concern, but away from the drama. One of her best stage was marked by the issue of blackness."

Her artwork can be found in various private collections worldwide. It can also be found in the Metropolitan Museum of New York, the Metropolitan Museum of Miami, the Museum of Modern Art in Mexico, the Contemporary Art of Madrid and the Gallery of Modern Art. Ledesma's work has also been featured in the Sarduy Gallery of New York, Art Gallery Nader, Signs of New York, and the Gallery of Modern Art in Santo Domingo.

== Awards and achievements ==
- 1948: Gran Premio de Pintura de Bellas Artes en Escultura
- 1949: Honorable mention, Exposición Femenina de Bellas Artes, Brazil.
- 1950: Third prize, painting, La V Bienal Nacional de de Artes Plásticas de Santo Domingo
- 1951: Representative of the Dominican Republic at the I Bienal Hispanoamerica de Arte, Madrid, Spain
- 1954: First prize, drawing, La VI Bienal Nacional de de Artes Plásticas de Santo Domingo for "Retrato"
- 1951: Representative of the Dominican Republic at the II Bienal Hispanoamerica de Arte, Havana, Cuba
- 1956: First prize, painting, La VII Bienal Nacional de Artes Plásticas de Santo Domingo
- 1958: First prize, painting, La VIII Bienal Nacional de Artes Plásticas de Santo Domingo, for "El Sacrificio del Chivo" ("The Sacrifice of the Goat")
- 1960: Second prize, painting, La X Bienal Nacional de Artes Plásticas de Santo Domingo, "Crepusculo en una Aldea" ("Twilight in a Village")
- 1960: Solo show at the Contemporaries of New York
- 1963: Second prize, painting, and first prize, drawing, La XI Bienal Nacional de Artes Plásticas de Santo Domingo
- 1964: Second prize, drawing, el Primer Concurso Anual de Arte Eduardo León Jimenes, for "Eco atávico"
- 1996: Knight of the Order of Merit of Duarte, Sánchez and Mella awarded by Leonel Fernández Reyna, president of the Dominican Republic
- 1999: Diploma de Honor, Asociación Dominicana Críticos de Arte, ADCA/AICA (posthumous)
- 2010: National Prize for Plastic Arts (posthumous)
- La Bienal de Madrid, Premio Nicaragua y Medalla de Oro
- Selected for the collective for the Medical Association for Puerto Rico titled "Maestros del Continente" ("Teachers of the Continent")

== Death ==
Ledesma died in Jamaica, Queens, at the age of 75.

== See also ==
- List of Dominican painters
- Visual art of the United States
- Women Surrealists
