= Jorge Noceda Sánchez =

Dominican-born American painter, diplomat

Cultural attaché, Dominican Republic Embassy in Tokyo
- In office 1964 –
- Constituency: Dominican Republic

Personal details
- Born: 6 September 1925 Santo Domingo, Dominican Republic
- Died: 11 March 1987 (aged 61) Miami, Florida, United States
- Education: Autonomous University of Santo Domingo; New York University; National Academy of Design
- Occupation: Diplomat, painter, gastroeonerolgist

Jorge Noceda Sánchez (6 September 1925 – 11 March 1987) was a Dominican-born American diplomat, and painter. His surrealist artwork has been collected by international museums. He also worked as a gastroeonerologist, and a dog breeder.

== Early life and education ==
Jorge Noceda Sánchez was born on 6 September 1925 in Santo Domingo, Dominican Republic. Sánchez received a medical degree from the University of Santo Domingo in 1952. After graduation, he moved to New York City to specialize in gastroenterology at New York University while working as a resident in the Bronx.

However, he quickly became absorbed with painting, his new-found hobby. Initially self-taught, his talent developed rapidly. In 1956, Sánchez enrolled at the National Academy of Design in New York City, where he received instruction from French and American artists, including Robert Philipp and René Bouché. His technique, magnificent color sense and whimsical style received immediate critical acclaim at exhibitions in New York, Havana and Santo Domingo, and later in Paris, Washington, D.C. and Mexico City.

== Career ==
By 1959, Sánchez decided to leave medicine and focus on his artwork. That year, he embarked on a world tour which brought him international recognition. During the tour, he exhibited in Tokyo, Hong Kong, New Delhi, Tel Aviv, Athens, Rome and at the Royal Academy in London. In 1960, he won a Gold Medal Award at the Biennial in São Paulo, Brazil.

In 1964, the Dominican Republic appointed Sánchez cultural attaché at the Dominican Republic Embassy in Tokyo.

In 1966, he was the first Dominican painter to exhibit at the Association Fraternal Latinoamericano . He later exhibited at Galleria 88 in Rome, the Federal Reserve in Washington, D.C. and galleries in New York City, including the Caravan Gallery, Hammer Gallery and, in 1975, at the Bodley Gallery, which featured the leading surrealist artists including Max Ernst, Yves Tanguy and René Magritte.

== Death ==
Sánchez died on 11 March 1987 in Miami, Florida, of colon and lung cancer at the age of 61.

== Museum collections ==
- Bellapart Museum, Santo Domingo, Dominican Republic
- Musée national d'Art moderne, Paris, France
- National Museum of Modern Art, Tokyo, Tokyo, Japan
- Museo de Arte Contemporáneo, Madrid, Spain
- Palacio de Bellas Artes, Mexico City, Mexico
- Museo Nacional de Bellas Artes de La Habana (Palacio de Bellas Artes), Havana, Cuba
- Ethnological Museum of Berlin, Berlin, Germany

== See also ==
- List of Dominican painters
- List of New York University alumni
- List of people from Miami
