= George Hausdorf =

German painter

George Hausdorf (1894–1959) was a German artist who worked in Germany, the Dominican Republic, and the United States. He produced works in oils, watercolors, pastels, and charcoal, as well as engravings. Subjects included landscapes, still lifes, portraits, cityscapes, and genre scenes.

== Early years and career in Europe ==
Hausdorf was born in Breslau, Germany, (now Wrocław, Poland) in 1894. He studied art in Berlin and continued his training in the Netherlands. Afterwards, he returned to Berlin to work as an art teacher. Hausdorf later moved to Hamburg, where he founded a painting academy that he directed for 20 years. Of Jewish descent, Hausdorf went into exile in the Dominican Republic in 1939 due to Nazi persecution of Jews in Germany.

== Career in the Dominican Republic ==
After arriving in the Dominican Republic, he started a private art school in Santo Domingo. He had his first solo exhibition in the Dominican Republic in 1939, and participated in numerous exhibitions and Biennial art shows over the next few years. He became a professor at the National School of Fine Arts when it opened in 1942. His students included notable Dominican artists Gilberto Hernández Ortega, Clara Ledesma, Eligio Pichardo, Aquiles Azar, and Ada Balcácer. Hausdorf’s paintings evolved in the Dominican Republic to incorporate a tropical palette of vivid blues, greens and yellows, as well as scenes of rural daily life.

== Final years in New York ==
In 1948, Hausdorf moved to New York City, where his art changed once again to reflect his new surroundings. His palette softened and his range of subjects expanded to include cityscapes and sidewalk scenes. Hausdorf died in New York in 1959.

Hausdorf participated in numerous exhibitions in Europe, the Dominican Republic and the United States. A retrospective of his work was held in the Bellapart Museum in Santo Domingo in 2005.
