= Eligio Pichardo =

Dominican and American painter (1929–1984)

- Born: 1929; Salcedo, Hermanas Mirabal Province, Dominican Republic
- Died: 1984 (aged 54–55)
- Education: • National School of Fine Arts • Instituto de Cultura Hispánica
- Known for: Painting
- Movement: Expressionism, Abstract Expressionism

Eligio Pichardo (1929–1984) was a Dominican-born American painter. He worked in Santo Domingo and New York City, producing expressionist and abstract expressionist works.

== Early life and education ==
Eligio Pichardo was born in 1929, in Salcedo, Hermanas Mirabal Province, and raised in San Francisco de Macorís, Duarte Province.

He enrolled in the National School of Fine Arts in Santo Domingo in 1945, studying under José Vela Zanetti and alongside Clara Ledesma and Gilberto Hernández Ortega. His early work was greatly influenced by Dominican artists Vela Zanetti, Jaime Colson and Darío Suro.

== Career ==
El Sacrificio del Chivo (Sacrifice of the Goat), oil on canvas, 1958 (Santo Domingo, Museo de Arte Moderno)

In the early 1950s, Pichardo painted hundreds of murals in schools throughout Santo Domingo. Themes included the history of the Dominican Republic and Don Quixote.

He participated in important biennial art exhibitions held throughout the world, including São Paulo, Madrid and Paris. In 1951, he won a prize at the Madrid Biennial. Three years later he received a scholarship from the Instituto de Cultura Hispánica to study in Madrid. During his time in Europe, he was influenced by the work of Pablo Picasso and Jean Dubuffet.

After returning to Santo Domingo, he became a professor at the National School of Fine Arts. He had several solo exhibitions and participated in biennial art shows. He won the Santo Domingo Biennial in 1958 with his painting El Sacrificio del Chivo (Sacrifice of the Goat).

In 1961, after signing with "The Contemporaries" gallery in Manhattan, Pichardo moved to New York City. He had his first solo exhibition in the city in 1962. Later, his work was exhibited in the Sarduy Gallery.

The artist continued to live and work in New York City until 1978, when he returned to Santo Domingo.

== Death ==
Pichardo died in 1984, at age 54–55.

== See also ==
- List of American artists 1900 and after
- List of Dominican painters
- List of Latin American painters
- List of people from New York City
