= Yoryi Morel =

Dominican painter, musician, and teacher (1906–1979)

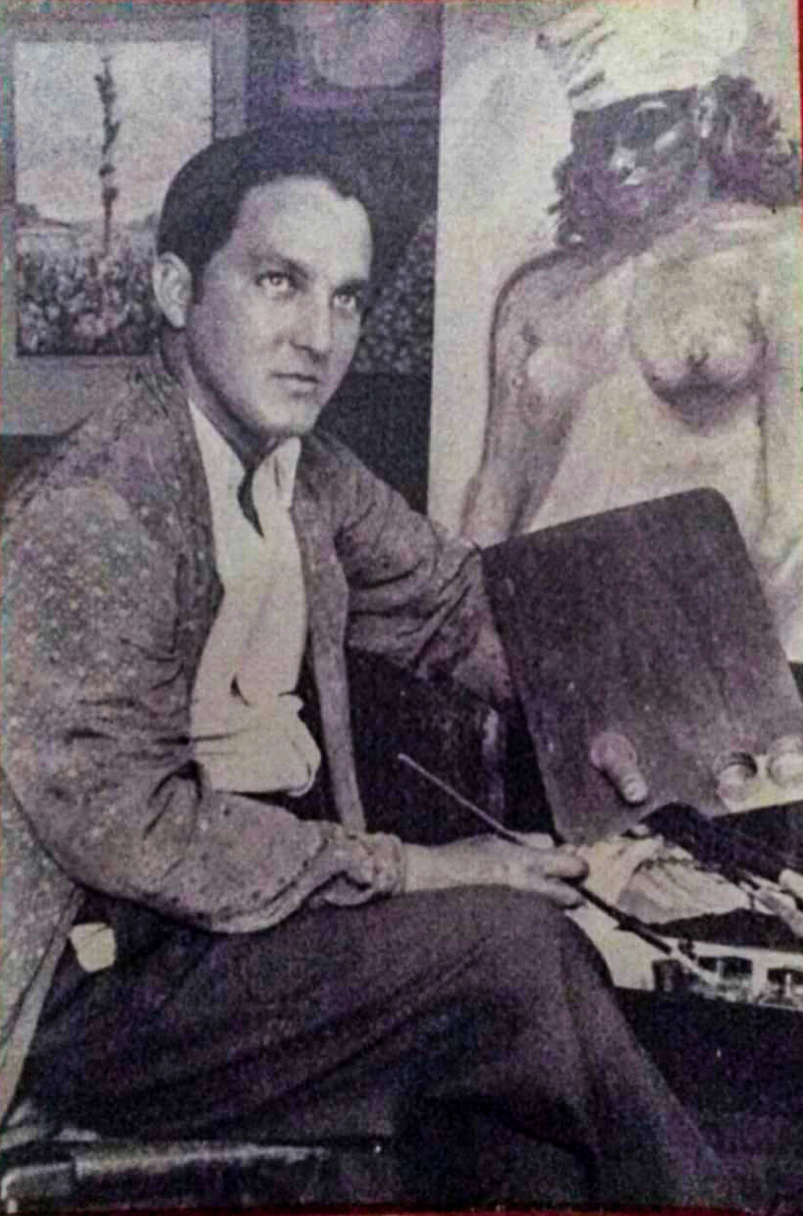
- Born: Jorge Octavio Morel Tavárez (or Tavares); 25 October 1906; Santiago de los Caballeros, Dominican Republic
- Died: 1979 (aged 72–73); Santiago de los Caballeros, Dominican Republic
- Education: Juan Bautista Gómez; self-taught
- Known for: Painting
- Spouse: Ilonka Szabó

Jorge Octavio Morel Tavárez (known as Yoryi Morel) was a Dominican painter, musician, and teacher born in Santiago de los Caballeros, Dominican Republic; he is remembered as the leading costumbrista painter in the country and one of the early progenitors of the Dominican modernist school of painting, along with contemporaries Jaime Colsón, Darío Suro, and Celeste Woss y Gil.

His style integrated realist and post-Impressionist techniques depicting a range of subject matters, such as street scenes of his native city, Santiago, of villages and rustic landscapes throughout the Cibao region; popular customs like festivals, religious rituals, ceremonies, and gaming activities; as well as an array of portraits of local characters.

Morel spent most of his life in his native city. In 1933, he founded a fine-arts school in Santiago de los Caballeros, going on to teach other native artists, including Clara Ledesma.

He died in 1979. Many of his works are exhibited in the National Museum of Modern Art in Santo Domingo.

== Life and career ==
Morel was born in Santiago de los Caballeros, one of seven children to Enrique Morel Bocanegra and Ana Teresa Tavárez Cabrera. His father owned a small cloth and hardware store, being listed as a merchant in the Directory and General Guide of the Republic, published at the beginning of the 20th century. This store was located on Calle del Sol, only a few blocks away from the family home on Las Piedras Street.

At an early age, Morel took to the arts, drawing and putting on puppet shows from the front porch of his house for the rest of the kids in his neighborhood. He first painted with inks and colors made from natural materials like linseed oil and the burning/boiling of sticks of campeche. When he was eleven, Morel began lessons with violinist Machilo Guzman, later joining the Santiago Philharmonic as second violin of the orchestra at the age of seventeen until the age of twenty. After high school, he declined his father’s wishes to pursue a university degree in Pharmacy, in order to focus on music and art. Though Morel was occasionally under the mentorship of fellow Santiago native Juan Bautista Gómez, he is generally considered to be self-taught.

In 1927, an Inter-Antillean Exhibition in Santiago was held; the art exhibition, which was attended by artists from Cuba, Puerto Rico, Haiti and other artists from Dominican Republic besides Morel. It wasn’t until the well-known journalist Juan Batutista Lamarche wrote an article on the twenty-four year old artist that enthusiasm and attention spread throughout the country for the provincial artist.

Morel held his first solo exhibition in Santo Domingo, at the time Cuidad Trujillo, in 1932. He participated in the Dominican Republic's first biennial art exhibition in 1942, and won first prize in the sixth biennial in 1952.

Morel for many years was devoted to teaching in Dominican Republic. His teachings influenced several generations of Dominicans artist such as Clara Ledesma and Ney Cruz, who was a leading Dominican costumbrista painter and is known for his landscapes, genre paintings, and portraits. He was good friends with other Dominican artists and writers such as Juan Bosch, Celeste Woss y Gil, Tomas Hernández Franco, Vigil Díaz, Manuel Llanes, and Aida Ibarra.

== Awards ==
He was declared the "Pintor Nacional" (national painter) by the Dominican Congress on October 25, 2006.

Morel was also appointed Deputy Director of the National School of Fine Art in 1948 and was honored by the Dominican government in 1973 with the “Order of Merit of Duarte, Sánchez and Mella” and the rank of "Caballero."

Two retrospectives were held to mark the 100th anniversary of his birth: Por los Caminos de Nuestra Expresión at the Museo Bellapart in Santo Domingo in 2006 and Autonomía y Trascendencia at Centro León in Santiago de los Caballeros in 2007.

== Personal life ==
He married Hungarian Ilonka Szabó, daughter of Károly Szabó and Szanet Czeglédy, with whom he had three children: Jorge Enrique Morel Szabó (1946), Janos Laszlo Morel Szabó (1949), and Ilonka Morel Szabó (1954). He also had two daughters from a previous relationship with Rosa Flete: Yolanda Antonia Morel Flete (1943) and Filomena Morel Flete.

== See also ==
- List of Dominican painters
