= Museo Bellapart =

Private art collection and museum in Santo Domingo, Dominican Republic

- Location: Santo Domingo, Dominican Republic
- Coordinates: 18.481955°N 69.925328°W
- Type: Art museum
- Director: Myrna Guerrero Villalona
- President: Juan José Bellapart
- Owner: Bellapart
- Website: museobellapart.com

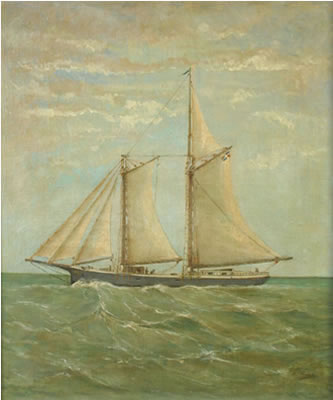
Schooner Separación Dominicana at the Battle of Tortuguero in 1844.

The Museo Bellapart is a free private art museum in Santo Domingo, Dominican Republic specifically in located at the corner of Av. John F. Kennedy founded in 1999 and is situated on the fifth floor, above a Honda car dealership. It was initially founded by Juan José Bellapart, a Catalan businessman. Bellapart died in 2020, however the collection is still owned by the Bellapart family. Its large permanent collection includes artwork from the mid-19th century to the 1960s.

== Collection ==
The museum's collection was carefully curated by Bellapart from his private collection, with the goal of teaching visitors about Dominican heritage and culture through the medium of art. The museum boasts has over 2000 pieces in its collection, including sculptures, paintings, engravings, drawings, and installations. They hold works by the following Dominican artists: Luis Desangles, Abelardo Rodríguez Urdaneta, Celeste Woss y Gil, Yoryi Morel, Darío Suro, Gilberto Hernández Ortega, Eligio Pichardo, Paul Giudicelli, Clara Ledesma, and many others. The museum holds the most complete collection of works by Jaime Colson. The works are arranged chronologically inside the museum. Additionally they host temporary exhibitions, highlighting artists who escaped the Franco dictatorship, and those exiled in the Dominican Republic during the Spanish Civil War.

The museum also holds a number of educational courses in Museology. In addition to this, they host art based workshops for children. The museum is free to visit.

== See also ==
- List of art museums
- List of museums in the Dominican Republic
