= José Joaquín Tejada =

Cuban painter (1867–1943)

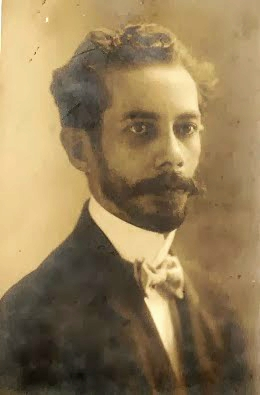
- Born: José Joaquín Tejada Revilla; 18 September 1867; Santiago de Cuba, Captaincy General of Cuba, Spanish Empire
- Died: 7 March 1943 (aged 75); Santiago de Cuba, Cuba
- Occupations: Painter, educator, writer
- Known for: Painting

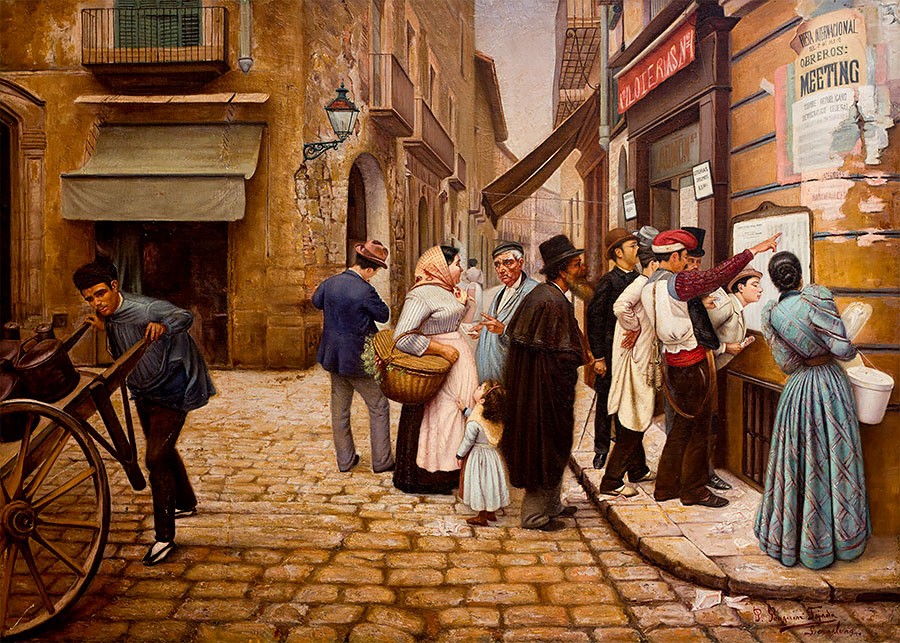
The Lottery List

José Joaquín Tejada Revilla (18 September 1867, Santiago de Cuba – 7 March 1943, Santiago de Cuba) was a Cuban painter. He was best known for his landscapes, which show the influence of the Barbizon school.

== Biography ==
His interest in art began by copying the lithographs made by his grandfather, Joaquín de Mata y Tejada, one of Cuba's first engravers. A government scholarship funded his initial studies, allowing him to visit Spain, Italy, France, and the Netherlands. After his return to Cuba he visited New York City, where he exhibited in 1894; at the same time he struck up an acquaintance with José Martí.

During the Cuban War of Independence, he took refuge in Mexico for three years. While there, he studied ancient Aztec art, which had a decisive effect on his color scheme.

Later in his career he taught at the Academy of Fine Arts in Santiago de Cuba, which has since been named after him, and also served as its director, in addition to being President of the Artistic Association of Oriente. Later, he was one of the founders of the Congreso de Arte. Among his best-known students was the Dominican artist, Celeste Woss y Gil. He was also a writer, publishing numerous essays on art in the journal Luz de Oriente.

A number of his important works were presented at the exhibit "Colonial Painting", which was held in 1950 at the Capitol Building in Havana. His paintings may be seen at the Museo Nacional de Bellas Artes de La Habana (with his most familiar painting, The Lottery List), the Emilio Bacardí Moreau Museum and the Museum of Arts and Sciences in Daytona Beach, Florida.

His cousin, Guillermo Collazo Tejada, was also a successful artist, with whom he occasionally collaborated.
