= José García Cordero =

Dominican artist

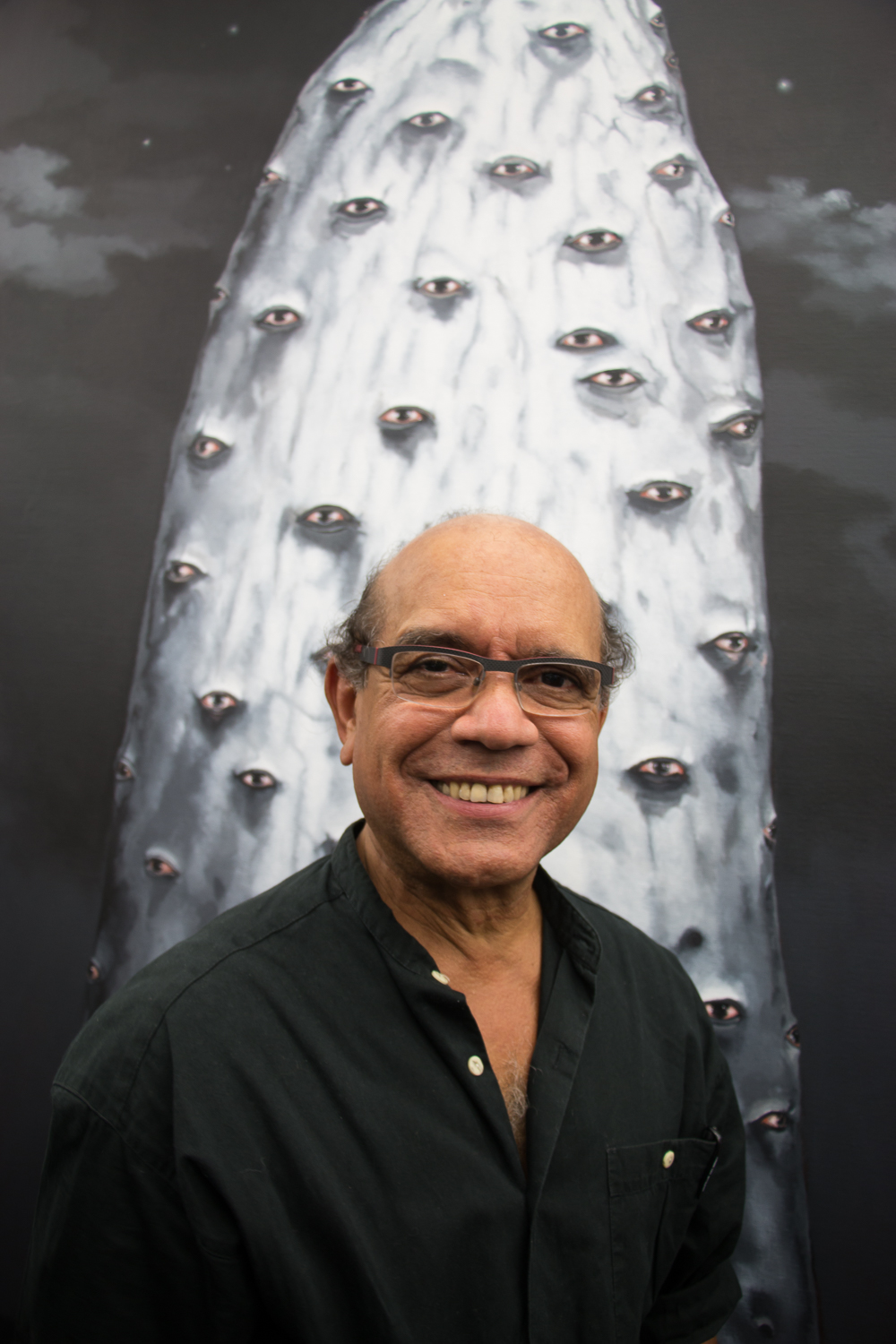
José García Cordero

José García Cordero (born 1951, Santiago, Dominican Republic) is a Dominican artist that lives and works in Paris.

== Education ==
He studied painting with the Dominican Master Hernández Ortega. In 1977, running away from Balaguer's dictatorship, he moves to Paris in a voluntary exile, where he studied Contemporary History in the University of Vincennes.

== Career ==
During his career, he has received multiple recognitions, such as the "Merit Medal" granted by the French Senate for his contributions to Latin American culture, the "Gold Medal" in the 1st and 3rd Edition of the Caribbean Biennale Museum of Modern Art of Santo Domingo, among others. His works have been exhibited in group and solo shows in galleries, museums, art fairs and institutions in Europe, Asia, Latin America, the Caribbean and the United States.

== Exhibitions ==
In 1994, he was part of the "Modern and Contemporary Art of the Dominican Republic," at the Americas Society of New York and the Bass Museum of Art of Miami Beach.

In 1995 he exhibits the itinerant show "Caribbean Visions" in the Smithsonian Museum, Washington, D.C., Center For The Fine Arts, currently named Pérez Art Museum Miami (PAMM), among other institutions. Judy Cantor, from Miami New Times, writes:

"In the stairwell leading to the exhibition hangs "Las Palmas de Morel" (Morel's Palm Trees), by Dominican painter José García Cordero. Depicting the tiny figure of an artist who stands at his easel below giant palm trees blowing fiercely in high winds, the painting provides an unsettling alternative to the typical tranquil image of the Caribbean landscape. [...] Garcia Cordero's painting hints that "Caribbean Visions" could be a provocative survey of inspired contemporary art [...]."

In 1996 he is selected for the "Marco Prize" in the Museum of Contemporary Art in Monterrey, Mexico. ARCO Madrid 97 "Latinoamerica en ARCO", Lyle O. Reitzel Gallery, curated by Octavio Zaya. 1998 "The Circle Comes Round: Recent Art From The Dominican Republic", The City University of New York (CUNY), N. Y. FIAC 2001 "Regard Sur L'art Latino Americain", Galerie Patrice Trigano, Paris. 2003 (Solo) "Human Conditions", Museum of Latin American Art, Long Beach, California. 2003 "Paradise Lost? Aspects of Landscapes Latin American Art", The Lowe Art Museum, Coral Gables, FL. 2003-2004 "EL MATA PERROS... Y OTROS COMO YO", Galería Angel Romero, Madrid, Spain. 2005 (Solo) "Dominicanazo: New wave of Dominican Contemporary Art", Samson Projects, Boston, MA. 2006 (Solo) "L'Eau Qui Dort", Galerie 13Sévigné, Paris, France. 2007 (Solo) "Full Optimist", Lyle O. Reitzel Gallery Miami, during Art Basel Miami Beach. 200 "Extended Boundary", Inter-American Development Bank Cultural Center, Washington, D.C. 2010 "Caribbean Trilogy’: Edouard Duval-Carrié, José Bedia and García Cordero, Little Haiti Cultural Center, LHCC, curated by Lyle O. Reitzel and Duval-Carrié, Art Basel Public Program, Special Event, Miami, FL. 2012 KIAF Seoul (South Korea), 2015 ‘Caribes’ Colección Cortés, Museo de San Juan, Puerto Rico.

His work has been exhibited in contemporary art fairs around the world like Context Art Miami during Art Basel, ArteBA Buenos Aires (Argentina), MIArt Milan (Italy), Scope NY, Scope Miami, and others.

He recently had his first ever solo show in New York, "Tales from the Caribbean Nights" at Lyle O. Reitzel NY's new branch opening on June 11 until July 30, 2016. This exhibition is a body of work consisting of 13 paintings, most of them unpublished, produced in acrylic on linen, covering the period of 2005–2016.

== Collections ==
His work belongs to the Permanent Collection of Salón Vitry-Sur Seine, France. Jesús David Alvarez/Vega Sicilia, Madrid, Spain, Angel Romero, Madrid, Spain. FRAC- Fondo Regional de Arte Contemporáneo, Martinica. Fundación Colección Cortés, Viejo San Juan, Puerto Rico. Colección Arq. Marcelo Narbona, Panama. Centro León Jimenes, Santiago, DR. Museo de Arte Moderno, Santo Domingo, DR. Banco Central, DR. Fundación Ortiz Gurdian, León, Nicaragua, the Congress of Dominican Republic, as well as the Museum of Latin American Art (MoLAA), among others.
