= Adolfo García Obregón =

Dominican painter (1865–1931)

- Born: 17 August 1865; Santiago de Cuba, Cuba
- Died: 1931 (aged 65–66); Santo Domingo, Dominican Republic
- Education: Luis Desangles
- Known for: Painting, Art education

Adolfo García Obregón (1865–1931) was a Dominican Republic painter, illustrator, teacher, and art critic. The son of a Dominican mother and Spanish father, García Obregón was born in Cuba and settled in Santo Domingo at a very young age, where he studied painting in the art school of Luis Desangles, and then travelled to Europe where he completed his training. He mostly painted landscapes, pictorial scenes, and portraits in the Romantic and Neoclassical style. Along with contributing illustrations to various art magazines, Obregón wrote articles on contemporary artists and taught drawing and painting in the early decades of the 20th century. In 1901, García Obregón established the Academy of Drawing and Painting in Santo Domingo. He died in Santo Domingo in 1931.

== Biography ==
García Obregón was born on August 17, 1865, in Santiago, Cuba to a Spanish army officer and a Dominican mother; after his father died, he moved to Santo Domingo with his mother and brother, Joaquín. In 1887, he began taking art lessons in Luis Desangles's art school, eventually moving to Madrid, Spain to continue his artistic studies, around his early twenties.

After returning to Santo Domingo, García Obregón became a professor at the Normal School, founded by Eugenio María de Hostos, and established his own private school of artistic education in 1901; later he went on to teach art at Abelardo Rodríguez Urdaneta's art academy. Around this time, he wrote "Drawing in the Dominican School", a teaching methodological text for a long time used in training programs, learned from academic regulations and fundamentals of European painting during his time in Spain. Many of his works are housed in private collections and in the Museo Bellapart in Santo Domingo.

== Gallery ==
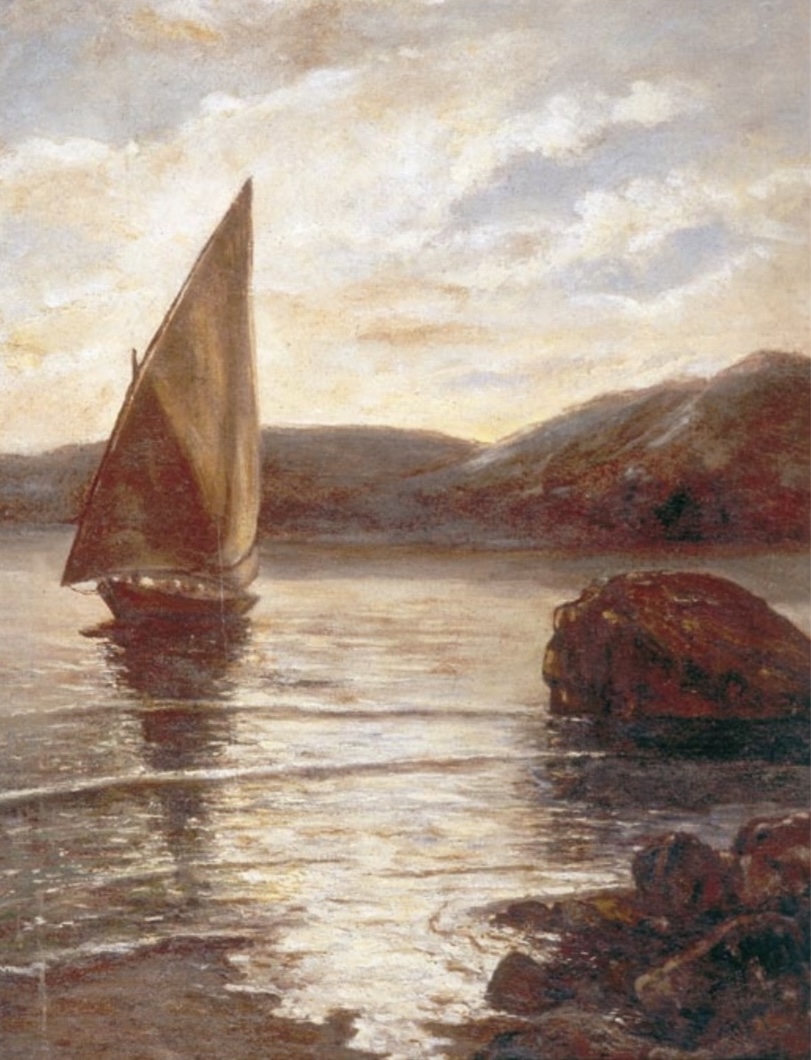
Marina, Adolfo García Obregón. Without date.

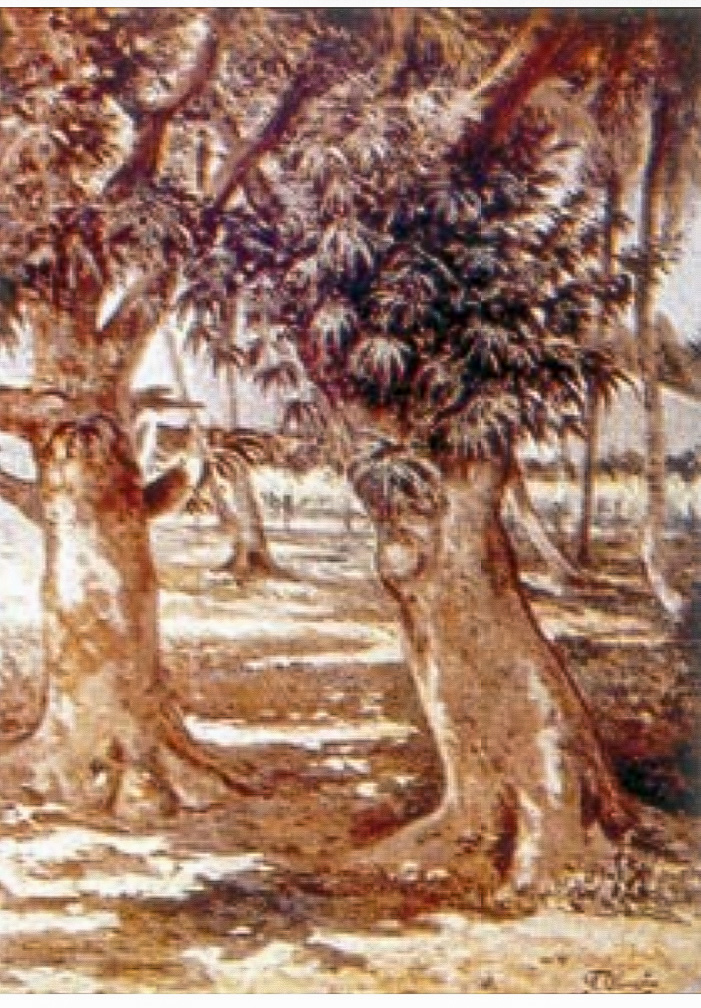
Tronco de Mango, Adolfo García Obregón. Sometime in the 1910s

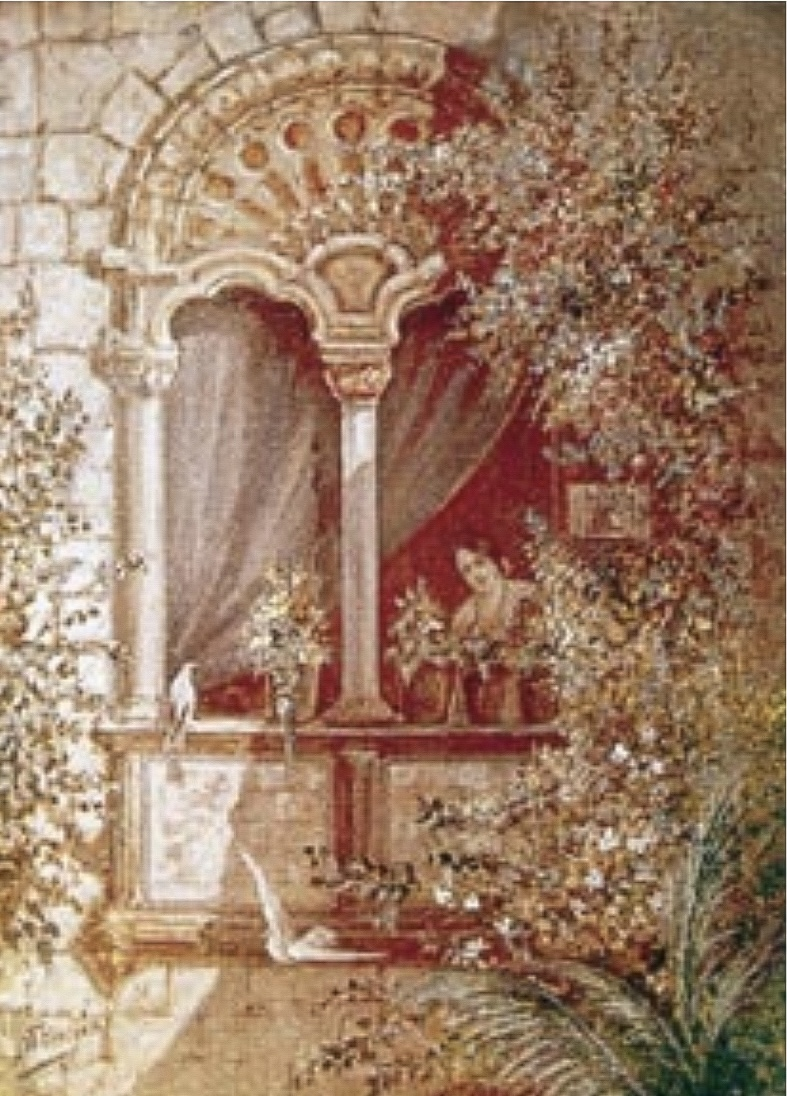
En espera, Adolfo García Obregón. Between 1910 and 1919

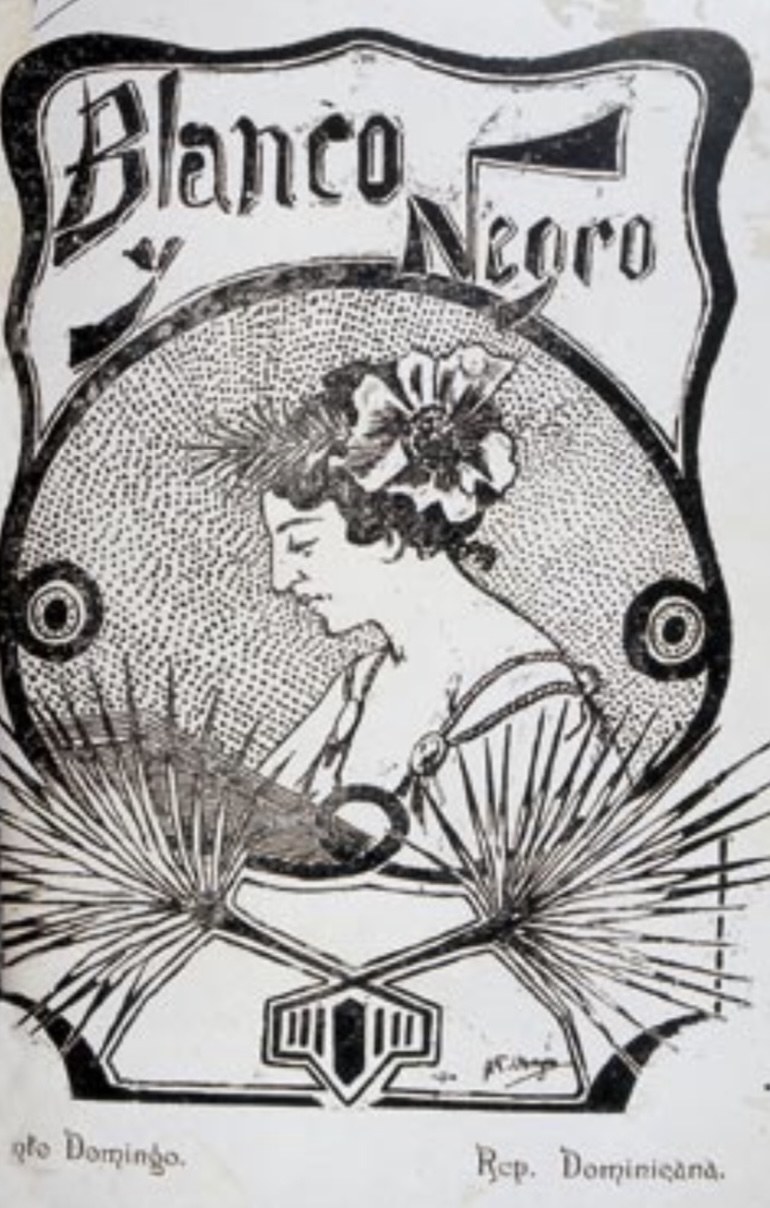
Revista Ilustrada Blanco y Negro. Adolfo García Obregón

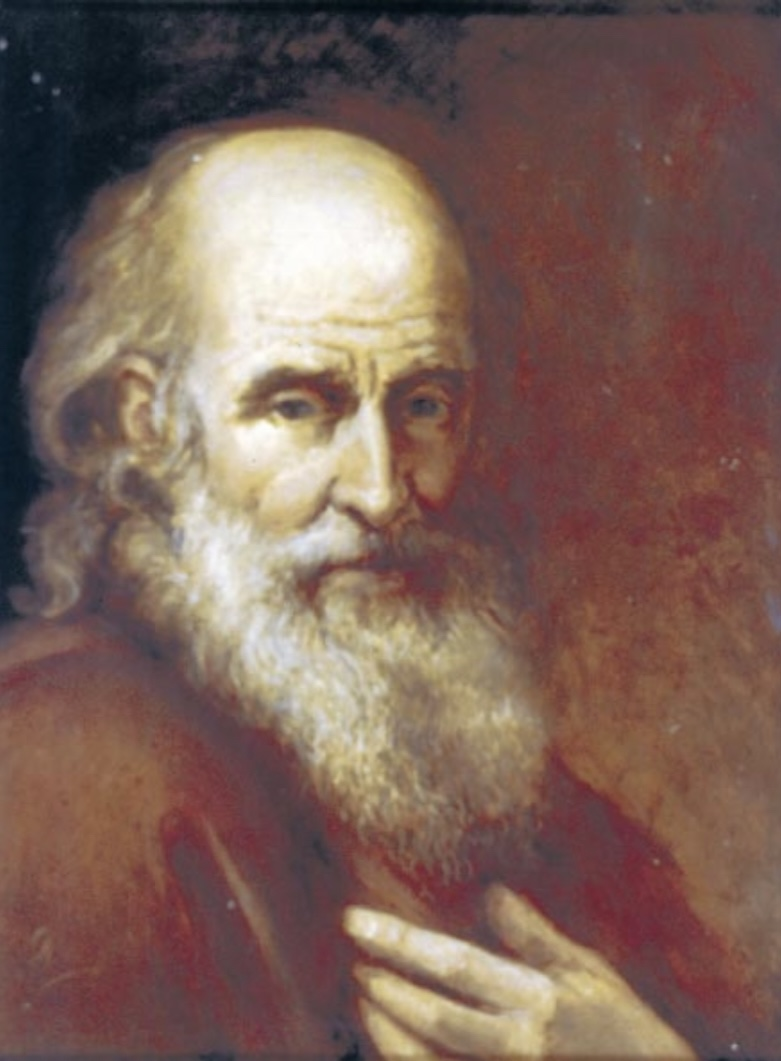
Retrato de anciano, Adolfo García Obregón. Without date.

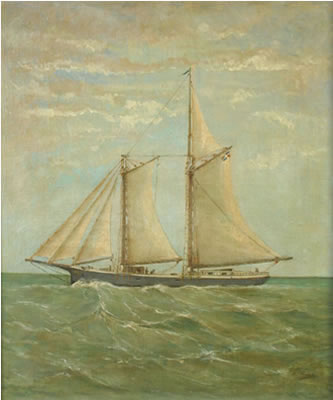
Goletaseparacion

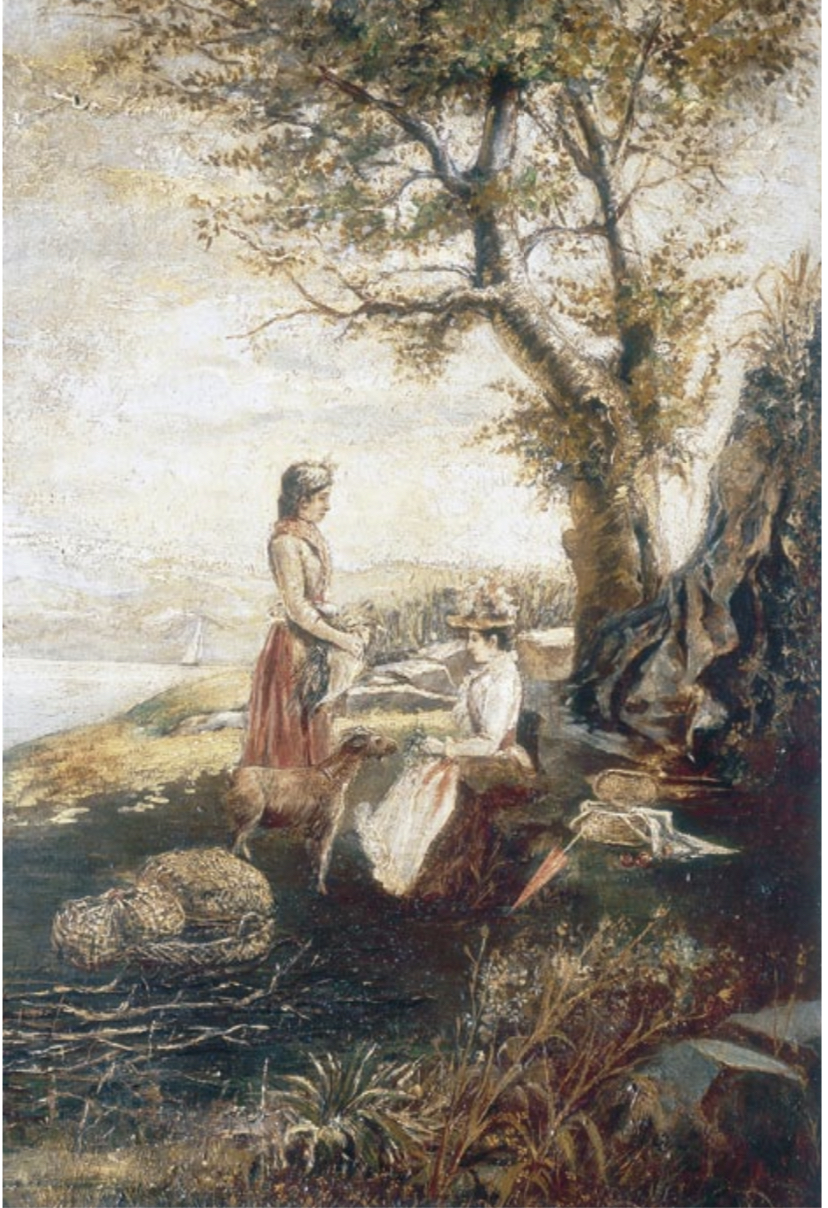
Comida Campestre, Adolfo García Obregón. Without date
