= Darío Suro =

Dominican diplomat and painter

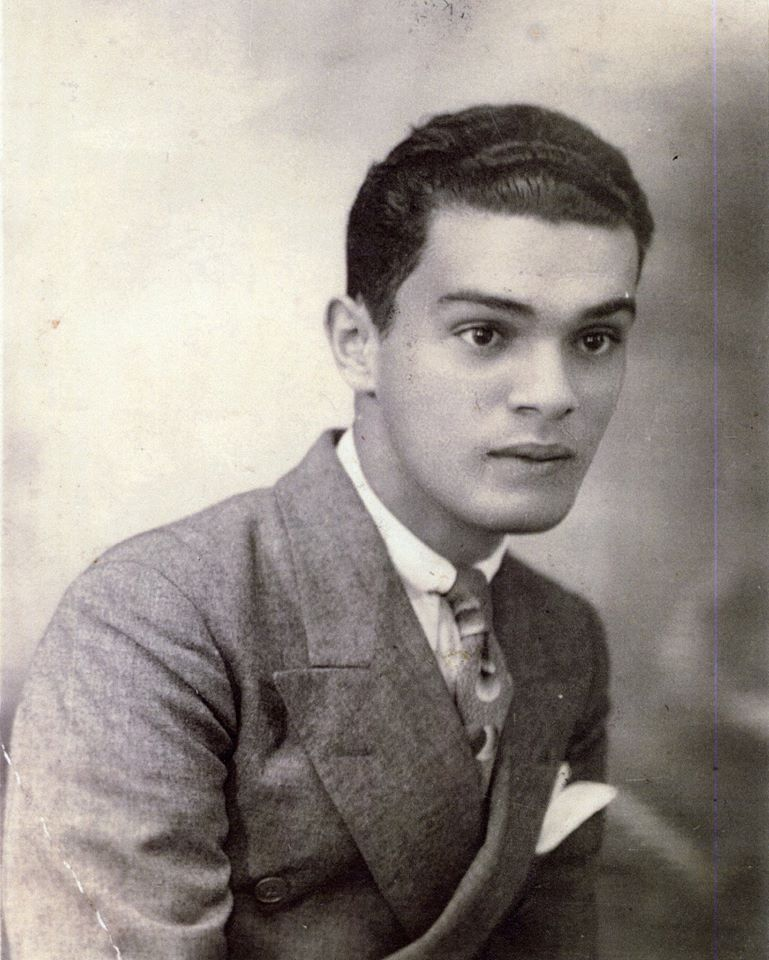

Cultural attaché, Embassy of the Dominican Republic Embassy, Mexico City
- In office 1943–1947
- Constituency: Dominican Republic

National Director of Fine Arts
- In office 1947–1950
- Constituency: Dominican Republic

Cultural attaché, Dominican Republic Embassy of the Dominican Republic, Madrid
- In office 1950 – c. 1953
- Constituency: Dominican Republic

Cultural attaché, Embassy of the Dominican Republic, Washington, D.C.
- In office 1962–1965
- Constituency: Dominican Republic

Counselor, Embassy of the Dominican Republic, Washington, D.C.
- In office 1965–1967
- Constituency: Dominican Republic

Minister Counselor, Embassy of the Dominican Republic, Washington, D.C.
- In office 1967–1970
- Constituency: Dominican Republic

Minister Plenipotentiary, Deputy Chief of Mission, Embassy of the Dominican Republic, Washington, D.C.
- In office 1970–1980
- Constituency: Dominican Republic

Adjunct Ambassador, Alternate Representative, Embassy of the Dominican Republic, Washington, D.C.
- In office 1980–1996
- Constituency: Dominican Republic

Personal details
- Born: June 13, 1917 La Vega, Dominican Republic
- Died: January 18, 1997 (aged 79) Santo Domingo, Dominican Republic
- Spouse: Maruxa Franco Fernandez
- Relations: Federico García Godoy (grandfather); Enrique García-Godoy (uncle); Rosa Delia García-Godoy (aunt); Héctor García-Godoy (cousin); Harold Priego García-Godoy (first cousin once removed); Laura García-Godoy (first cousin twice removed)
- Children: Jaime, Federico and Rosa
- Education: Escuela Nacional de Pintura, Escultura y Grabado "La Esmeralda"
- Occupation: Art critic, diplomat, painter

Darío Antonio Suro García-Godoy (June 13, 1917, La Vega – January 18, 1997, Santo Domingo) was a Dominican painter, art critic, and diplomat from La Vega, Dominican Republic, remembered as one of the most influential Dominican artists from the 20th century. Suro's paintings encompassed a wide range of styles from the impressionist mood of his early paintings, to the neo-realism of his maturity, and finally to the abstraction of his later works. Together with his contemporaries Yoryi Morel, Jaime Colson, and Celeste Woss y Gil, he is known as one of the progenitors of modernist art in the Dominican Republic.

In his country he studied first under his uncle, the painter Enrique García-Godoy. He worked as a diplomat throughout his career with his first appointment in 1943 as the cultural attaché of Dominican Republic to Mexico; during his stay in Mexico, Suro studied with Diego Rivera, Jesus Guerrero Galván, and Agustín Lazo. Upon his return to the Dominican Republic, Suro had an important solo exhibition at the National Gallery of Fine Arts.

Suro resided in Spain during the early 1950s where he became fascinated with the art of El Greco, Diego Velázquez, and Francisco Goya. In the late 1950s, Suro left his home country for New York City, where he lived for many years. Four years after the Dictator Rafael Trujillo's assassination, Suro returned to Dominican Republic in 1965, resuming his career as a diplomat serving in various embassies, culminating in a post in Washington, DC.

In addition to a career as a prolific painter, Suro wrote extensively on art and frequently contributed to Dominican and international art magazines. In 1969, Suro also produced a survey of modern Dominican painting consisting of brief monographs of the country's major artists. Throughout his long career, Suro was recognized with many honors, being the first artist to receive the 'Premio Nacional de Artes Plasticas' awarded by President Joaquin Balaguer in 1993.

== Early life ==
Suro was born in La Vega to a family of intellectuals and artists; his grandfather was writer Federico García Godoy (1859-1924), and his uncle was the painter Enrique Garcia Godoy, the founder of an arts school in La Vega. His parents were Jaime Vicente Suro Sánchez, who was a government worker, and Isabel Emilia García-Godoy Ceara; they had two children, Darío and Ruben, named after the famous Nicaraguan poet Rubén Darío, whom Jaime Suro greatly admired. From a very early age, Suro knew he wanted to dedicate his life to art, against his parents wishes; his first painting teacher was his uncle, when he enrolled into his school in 1935.

Suro's early paintings were of the tropical landscapes of his hometown, largely painted with soft tones. He became popular early on as an Impressionist landscape artist, often painting horses and rainy scenes of the Cibao region of his country. Suro had his first solo exhibition in 1938 at the Ateneo Dominicano in Santo Domingo. Subsequently, he was included in group exhibitions in New York City, at the Riverside Museum and the Dominican Republic Pavilion at the 1939 New York World's Fair.

In 1940, Suro participated in the Inter-American Exhibition of the Caribbean organized by the Organization of American States. In that same year, he participated in a group show at the Ateneo Dominicano in Santo Domingo. In 1942, he had a solo exhibition at the Escuela Nacional de Bellas Artes in Santo Domingo. In 1943, he married Maruxa Franco Fernandez, a school teacher from Santiago.

== Professional career ==
=== Mexico 1943-1947 ===
Shortly after marrying, Suro and his wife departed to Mexico City where the young artist was appointed cultural attaché in the Dominican Republic Embassy. During this time, the Mexican capital was considered the center of art in Latin America, and Suro began studying at Escuela Nacional de Pintura, Escultura y Grabado "La Esmeralda", where he studied art for nearly four years with some of the most prestigious artists in Mexico, including Diego Rivera, Agustín Lazo, Jesús Guerrero Galván and Manuel Rodríguez Lozano, as well as befriending other artists like José Clemente Orozco, Frida Kahlo, Lupe Marin and José Vasconcelos, who would play a crucial role in Suro's career. In 1944, he received word that he had won the second prize (silver medal) at the Second National Fine Arts Biennial in Santo Domingo. Two years later he won first prize (gold medal) at the Third National Fine Arts Biennial.

Suro's style changed dramatically during the four years he lived in Mexico; influenced by the nationalistic spirit of the Mexican social-realists that embraced indigeneity, Suro sought to create a Dominican perspective that changed the Indian for the Black. The Parsley massacre of 1937 was also fresh in the mind of the artist, who painted several works depicting terrifying scenes of mutilated children and headless corpses.

In 1946, he was included in a group show at the Palacio de Bellas Artes in Mexico City. The following year, he had a solo exhibition at the institution, an event that was widely publicized in the city, bringing him recognition from some of the most important art critics – but perhaps leading to his downfall with his own government. His embassy job was suddenly terminated. Suro was told by unofficial sources that the dictator Rafael Trujillo was not happy with the attention he had received in Mexico.

Shortly after Suro returned to his home country, Vasconcelos arrived in Santo Domingo on an official visit and raved to Trujillo about the recently repatriated diplomat and painter, calling him "brilliant", and strongly urged the Dominican leader to name Suro Director of Fine Arts. This happened in early 1947 and once again Suro was celebrated. That same year, he had a successful solo exhibition at the National Palace of Fine Arts in Santo Domingo, showing works that were shown in Mexico with a few recent Dominican additions. As Director of Fine Arts, received distinguished guests, including Alicia Markova and Anton Dolin and groups like the celebrated "Coros y Danzas" from Spain. He was responsible for overseeing new exhibitions at the Palacio de Bellas Artes and setting up cultural programs. He also gave lectures covering a wide range of themes, like the one on his friend José Clemente Orozco, "La Muerte de Orozco", which he gave at the Instituto Dominico Americano in Santo Domingo. In 1948, he participated in the 4th National Biennial of Fine Arts.

=== Spain 1950-1953 ===
In 1950, Suro was sent to Spain as cultural attaché of the Dominican Republic. Arriving with his family in Madrid, Suro befriended some of the most prominent Spanish artists of the time, including Antonio Saura, Antoni Tàpies, Manolo Millares, and Jose Caballero ("Pepe"). Suro was also able to see great art, including works by his personal favorites Velázquez, El Greco and Goya. Living in Spain also facilitated extensive travel to other European cities, including Paris, London and Amsterdam. He especially loved Italy, and was particularly impressed by the works of Piero della Francesca.

Combining diplomacy and art as he had in Mexico, Suro participated in group exhibitions in Madrid and Barcelona, as well as faraway places like San Francisco (Legion of Honor) and Pittsburgh (Carnegie Institute). He was invited to participate in the Salón de los Once in 1951, along with ten other artists, a venue organized by the philosopher Eugenio d'Ors. The same year, he participated in the First Hispano-American Biennial, which was exhibited in Madrid and Barcelona. He represented the Dominican Republic in several important congresses (including the Congreso de la Cooperacion Intellectual Latino Americano—1952) while continuing his travels throughout the Iberian Peninsula and several other European nations. In terms of his artistic development, Spain had a significant impact. This is where Suro painted his first abstract canvases, influenced by European trends.

As in Mexico, his busy professional life came to an abrupt end. His job was suddenly terminated, without any explanation. The Suros heard gossip about the termination of his job and a close friend, who happened to be related to Trujillo's wife, recommended that they leave the country.

=== United States 1953-1996 ===
With limited English, the artist moved to New York City with his family in 1953. His wife immediately found work as a seamstress in a factory, however Suro had a harder time. Visiting several establishments that hired artists to do fairly routine work, he soon realized that there was little demand. He finally found a job in a factory where artists painted porcelain, screens and other objects. They were given models to work from, with a limited freedom of artistic expression. Nevertheless, Suro explored the New York City art scene. He started contacting dealers and gallery owners, including Rose Fried, Betty Parsons, and Leo Castelli.

As an art critic, Suro wrote the first in-depth critical articles on both Piet Mondrian and Stuart Davis in the Spanish language. He reintroduced the work of Joaquín Torres García to the artists within the Rose Fried Gallery circle, where he was asked to write the text of an accompanying monograph for Torres Garcia's 1960 breakthrough exhibition. He wrote for many international publications, including the Paris-based Aujourd'hui and the Madrid-based Cuadernos Hispanoamericanos, and he was a frequent contributor at El Caribe and other newspapers in the Dominican Republic.

Through his job, he met Herman Somberg, who happened to be a close friend of Franz Kline. After a certain reluctance, the latter finally agreed to meet Suro and the two became fast friends (later Suro reminisced about the encounter and ensuing friendship in an article written for Americas Magazine "Franz Kline – Freedom and Space" in 1969). He frequented the Cedar Tavern in Manhattan, which he later called "one of the great universities of my life" and the place where he drank seriously along with his growing number of acquaintances. Another special friend was Philip Guston, who was fluent in Spanish. Many of the friends that he met were part of the Neo-Plasticist world. As in Mexico and Spain, Suro changed his style once again, expressing himself through geometric abstract images and eventually going on to paint works that were decidedly informal and expressionistic.

He participated in group shows at the Rose Fried Gallery, including the International Collage Exhibition in 1956, and the "International Avant Garde Perspectives" at the Newport Art Association in 1959. He finally had a solo exhibition at the Poindexter Gallery, in Manhattan, in 1962.
After the assassination of Trujillo in 1961, Juan Bosch, Suro's childhood friend, was elected President of the Dominican Republic in 1962. Bosch named Suro the cultural attaché at the Embassy of the Dominican Republic in Washington, D.C., as well as at the Organization of American States (OAS). Suro remained in these posts for most of the rest of his life.

Suro continued painting and exhibiting worldwide into his old age. He also continued writing, frequently contributing to Americas Magazine, several Dominican Republic publications, including Ahora and Listin Diario, as well as international ones, including Cuadernos Hispanoamericanos and Acento Cultural. He was promoted from cultural attaché to Counselor (1965) to Minister Counselor (1967) to Minister Plenipotentiary, Deputy Chief of Mission (1970) and finally Adjunct Ambassador, Alternate Representative (1980).

In October 1996, he returned to the Dominican Republic with his wife. He was hoping to concentrate on his art, however, he died the following January. His funeral was attended by many friends, as well as Dominican dignitaries; three former Dominican presidents were present – Salvador Jorge Blanco, Donald Reid Cabral and Juan Bosch. Suro was the first artist to receive "El Premio Nacional de Artes Plasicas" of the Dominican Republic in 1993, which was presented to him by President Joaquín Balaguer. The "Orden de Duarte, Sanchez y Mella" medal was presented posthumously to his widow by President Leonel Fernández in 1999.

== Personal life ==
Suro married Maruxa Franco Fernandez in 1943, and together they had 3 children: Jaime, Federico, and Rosa. Suro's first son, Jaime, died suddenly shortly before his second birthday.

Dario Suro died on January 18, 1997, at the age of 79.

== Gallery ==

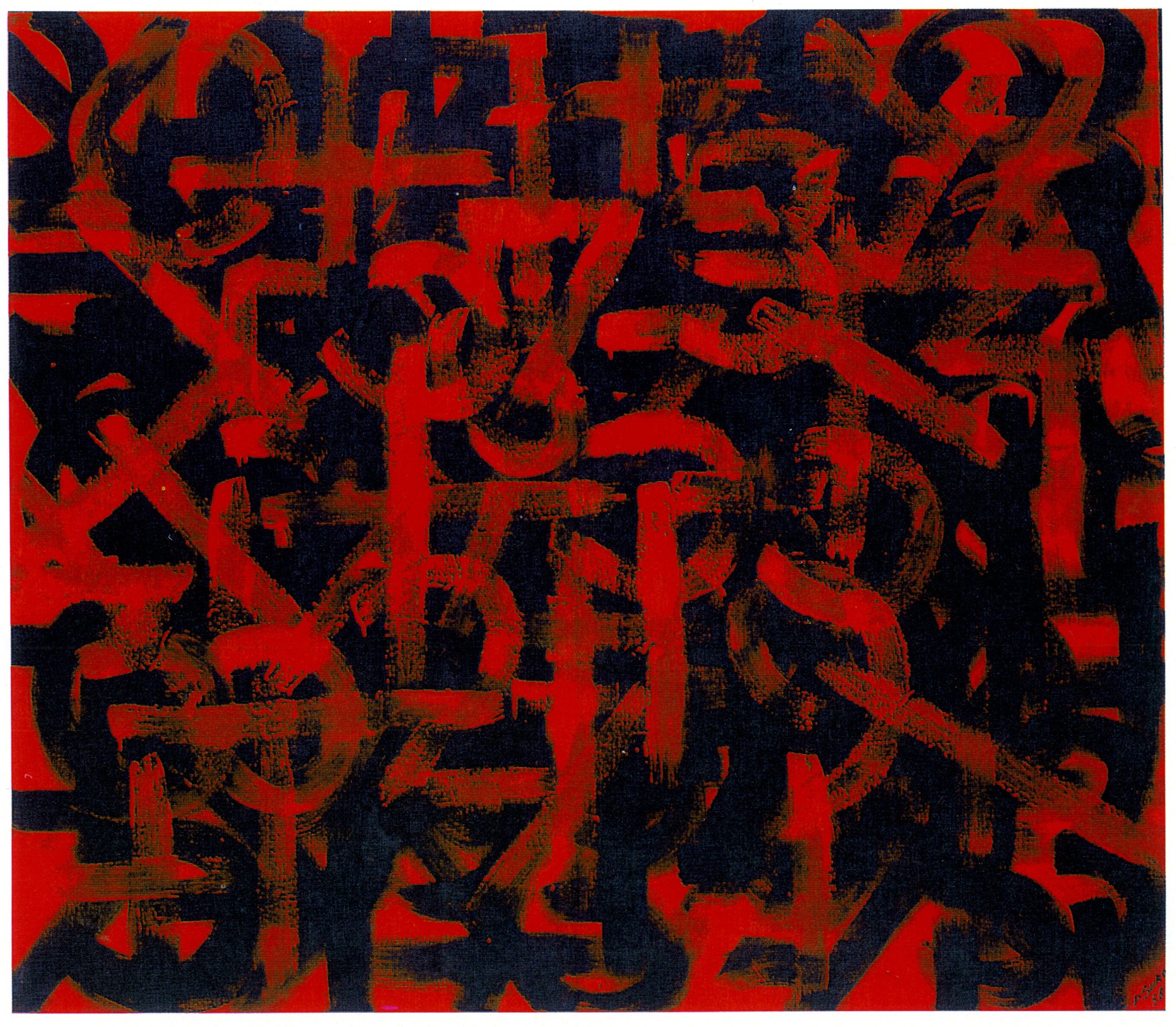
Numbers, 1958 (Private Collection)

== Writings ==
- Dario Suro. "Orozco en su sitio". Cuadernos Dominicanos de Cultura. Volume VI, Number 73. page 16. Santo Domingo. September 1949.
- Dario Suro. "El Mundo Magico Taíno". Cuadernos Hispanoamericanos. Number 17. page 259. Madrid. September–October 1950.
- Dario Suro. "La pintura de Esteban Vicente". El Mundo. San Juan. July 29, 1951.
- Dario Suro. "Dos Pintores Americanos: Davis y Glarner". El Caribe. page 11. Santo Domingo. January 9, 1955.
- Dario Suro. "L'espace: Mondrian et Picasso". Aujourd'hui - Art & Architecture. Number 20. page 28. Paris. December 1958.
- Dario Suro. "Joaquín Torres García" (monograph). Rose Fried Gallery. New York. 1960.
- Dario Suro. "De Malevich A Demain". Aujourd'hui - Art & Architecture. Number 29. page 54. Paris. December 1960.
- Dario Suro. "The Baroque in Santo Domingo". Americas. Washington, D.C. 1963.
- Dario Suro. "Torres Garcia of Uruguay, Universal Constructionist". Americas. Volume 17, Number 3. page 24. Washington, D.C. March 1965.
- Dario Suro. "Stuart Davis (1894–1964)". America. Washington, D.C. 1965.
- Dario Suro. "Taíno Sculpture – Of Artists and Owls". Americas. Volume 18, Number 3. page 21. Washington, D.C. March 1966.
- Dario Suro. "Estilo y Condicion". El Nacional de Ahora. page 25. Santo Domingo. October 29, 1967.
- Dario Suro. Arte Dominicano (first comprehensive history of Dominican Art). Santo Domingo; Publicaciones AHORA, C. por A.; 1968.
- Dario Suro. "Franz Kline - Freedom and Space". Americas - Volume 20, Number 6. page 21. Washington, D.C. June 1968.
- Dario Suro. "Taíno Sculpture" (part 2). Americas. Volume 20, Number 11–12. Washington, D.C. November–December 1968.
- Dario Suro. Colson – Dominicano Universal. Publicaciones Ahora. Santo Domingo. 1969.
- Dario Suro. "Construccion de un Desorden". Ahora. Number 440. Santo Domingo. April 17, 1973
- Dario Suro. "Thomas Jefferson, the Architect". Americas. Volume 25, Numbers 11–12. page 29. Washington, D.C. November–December 1973.

== Bibliography ==
- Staff (undated). "Dario Soro 1917–1998". Museo Bellapart. Retrieved August 23, 2013.
- Museo de Arte Moderno. Santo Domingo.
- Berardo Collection Museum. Lisbon.
- Latin Art Museum. Fernando Urena Rib (online). "Trascendencia en la obra de Dario Suro".
- Almagre, Juan (1946). "Notas de Arte". Ultimas Noticias del Excelsior. Mexico D.F.
- Anreus, Alejandro (1993). "Three Latin American Masters". Montclair Art Museum. Montclair, New Jersey.
- Anreus, Alejandro (Fall 1994). "Dario Suro: The Mexican Period"; STET. Volume 2, Number 2. Pages 18–19. New York.
- Anreus, Alejandro (Winter 1997). "Dario Suro"; ARS Atelier. New York.
- Barberan, Cecilio (1951). "Arte de Hoy en Madrid – Suro en el Salon de los 11". Informaciones. Madrid.
- Benitez, Benito (October 1946). "Dario Suro". Prensa Grafica – Seccion de Arte y de Letras. Mexico D.F.
- Bethel, Leslie (1995). The Cambridge History of Latin America. Volume 10 – Latin America Since 1930: Ideas Culture and Society. Page 414. Cambridge University Press.
- del Calstillo Pichardo, Jose (2007). "Dominican Cultures – The Making of a Caribbean Society". Markus Wiener Publishers. Page 73. (published in Spanish in 1981 by the Fundación Cultural Dominicana)
- Cirici Pelicer, A. (March 18, 1952). "Dario Suro". Hoy – Seccion La Forma Viva. Page 21. Barcelona.
- Cortes Tamayo, R. (October 21, 1946). "Dario Suro Pintor Dominicano". Prensa Grafica – Seccion de Arte y de Letras. Mexico D.F.
- Edmundo Ory, Carlos (March 15, 1952). "Exposiciones de la Semana". Diario de Barcelona. Barcelona.
- Edmundo Ory, Carlos (1952). "Nuestro Tiempo – Poesia & Pintura". (Suro and Ory collaborative monograph) Madrid.
- Ferretti, Figuerola (1951). "Octavo Salon de los Once (Sala Biosca)". Arte. Madrid.
- Garcia Cisneros, Florencio (1960). 40 Latin American Artists In New York. New York.
- Garcia Rogriguez, Jose Maria (June 17, 1948). "D. Suro o Lo Humano En La Angustia Del Hombre". La Nación. Santo Domingo.
- Gaton Arce, Freddy (July 18, 1949). "La Medida – Oleo de Suro". El Caribe. Page 9. Santo Domingo.
- Geron, Candido (2011). Dominican Art – From Modernism to the Vanguard – 1940–2010. Santo Domingo.
- Guest, Barbara (1956). "Notes on Collage", Arts. Volume 30, Number 6. Page 51. New York.
- Gil, Laura (December 5, 1987). "En La Galeria – Dario Suro". El Caribe. Page 13. Santo Domingo.
- Gil, Laura (December 1, 1990). "Rafael Squirru: Dario Suro es uno de los Grandes Maestros de Latino America". El Caribe. Page 13. Santo Domingo.
- Herman, Sara (Spring 1999). "Ceremonias y Tiempos. Suro y Su Ritual. Dario y El Presente". ARS Atelier. Page 15. New York.
- Izquierdo, María (October 1946). "Anoche se inauguro la exposiccion del pintor Dario Suro". El Nacional. Mexico D.F.
- Llado de Cosso, Jose (March 31, 1951). "Un gran pintor dominicano habla de una gran exposicion". El Día. Tegucigalpa.
- Lara Pardo, Luis (November 10, 1946). "Cuadros de Dario Suro". Revista de Revistas – Seccion Exposiciones. Page 39. Mexico City.
- Miller, Jeannette (October 31, 1981). "Suro: Drama y Movimiento; Una Magnifica Retrospectiva". El Caribe. Page 14. Santo Domingo.
- Miller, Jeannette (December 12, 1987). "La Pintura Bestial de Dario Suro". Hoy (Seccion Temas Especial Para Hoy en la Galeria). Santo Domingo.
- Mitila Lora, Ana (November 12, 1999). "Los Mexicanos Con Sus Indios, Los Dominicanos Con Sus Negros" (interview with Maruxa Franco viuda Suro). Listin Diario. Seccion La Republica – Memorias del Pasado. Page 12 A. Santo Domingo.
- Ortiz, Benjamin; Valdes Jr., Gustavo (1996). "Art in Transit – A Dominican Experience". (catalogue for the exhibit at INTAR Latin American Gallery). New York.
- Poupeye, Veerle (1998). Caribbean Art. London: Thames and Hudson.
- Ramon Jarne, Ricardo (2001). (catalogue raisonné with essays by Maria Ugarte, Laura Gil and Marianne de Tolentinos). "Dario Suro 1917–1879 : Metamorfosis y Transmigraciones". Santo Domingo. Centro Cultural de Espana.
- Reyes, Alfonso (1946). Dario Suro Exhibition Catalogue. (commentaries by Alfonso Reyes and María Izquierdo) Palacio de Bellas Artes. Mexico City.
- Salazar, Adolfo (1946). "Las Artes En Mexico De Semana A Semana". Novedades. Mexico D.F.
- de los Santos, Danilo (November 21, 1981). "1. La Leccion Retrospectiva De Dario Suro: Impressionismo, Realismo Racial y Expresionismo". Hoy – Suplemento Isla Abierta. Pages 4–5. Santo Domingo.
- de los Santos, Danilo (November 28, 1981). "2. La Leccion Retrospectiva De Dario Suro: Informalismo, Neopaisajismo y Figuracion Fraccionada". Hoy – Suplemento Isla Abierta. Pages 4–5. Santo Domingo.
- de los Santos, Danilo (2003–2007). "Memoria de la Pintura Dominicana" (eight-volume Encyclopedia of Dominican Art). Santo Domingo and Santiago de los Caballeros: Grupo León Jimenes.
- Santos Torroella, Rafael (1952). "1 Bienal Hipanoamericana de Arte". Mundo Hispanico. Number 46. Madrid.
- Soto Ricart, Humberto (December 8, 1974). "Dario Suro y Su Proxima Exposicion Retrospectiva". El Nacional De Ahora – Suplemento Dominical. Pages 4–5. Santo Domingo.
- Squirru, Rafael (1978). Arte De America (El Arte Erotico De Dario Suro. Pages 361–363). Buenos Aires: Ediciones Gaglianone.
- Sullivan, Edward J. (1996) "Dominican Crossroads" (from Modern and Contemporary Art of the Dominican Republic). Page 13. New York: Americas Society and the Spanish Institute.
- Suro, Federico (three-part article; January 2, 9 and 16, 1999). "Dario Suro Fragmentado – Apuntes De Una Vida En Formato De Collage" Listin Diario. Ventana, Artes Y Letras. Santo Domingo.
- Suro, Federico (January 9, 1999). "Dario El Dibujante". El Caribe. Page 20. Santo Domingo.
- Tanasescu, Horia (June 7, 1953). "Exposicion Retrospectiva de Dario Suro". El Caribe. Santo Domingo.
- de Tolentino, Marianne (October–November 1981). "Historica y Joven Retrospectiva de Dario Suro" Listin Diario (three-part article).
- de Tolentino, Marianne (November 28, 1987). "Bienvenido Sea El Desafio De Dario Suro". Listin Diario (Suplemento). Page 20. Santo Domingo.
- Tourres, Choucette (1946). "Exposicion Dario Suro". Revista Manana. Mexico D.F.
- Ugarte, Maria (February 7, 1967). "La Pintura De Dario Suro Esta En Continua Evolucion". El Caribe. Santo Domingo.
- Valdes, Zoe (Spring 1999). "Fantasia – Al Suro de todos los tiempos" (short story dedicated to Dario Suro). ARS Atelier. Page 17. New York.
- Valdes Jr., Gustavo (Summer 1998). "Dario Suro: La Herejia en el Arte". ARS Atelier. Page 10. New York.
- de la Vega, Lolita (February 1997). "Dario Suro – Gran Pintor, Critico de Arte y Diplomatico". Temas magazine. Volume 47, Number 542; New York.
- Velazquez Chavez, Agustin (November 13, 1946). "Dario Suro". Ars. Mexico D.F.
- Velazquez, Rufo (1951). "VIII Salon de los Once". Arte. Madrid.
- Zakrzewski Brown, Isabel (1999). Culture and Customs of the Dominican Republic. Page 170. Westport, Connecticut: Greenwood Publishing Group.
- Zanetti, Vela (May 1954). "Les Arts Plastiques". La Revue Française. Volume 6, Number 56. Pages 67–70. Paris.
- Several authors (2010). Coleccion Permanente de Arte de la Camara de Diputados. "Trascendencia y Esplendor". Santo Domingo.
