= Fernando Peña Defilló =

Dominican artist

Fernando Peña Defilló (1926 – 18 May 2016) was a Dominican Republican artist.

== Biography ==
Peña Defilló was born in 1926 in Santo Domingo into a white family of Spanish ancestry (by his father, he had colonial Canarian heritage, and by his mother, Catalan descent). His father, Manuel Arturo Peña Batlle (1902–1954), was a lawyer, historian and diplomat who served as President of the Chamber of Deputies of the Dominican Republic (1942–1943) and as Minister of Foreign Affairs (1943–1946); his mother was Carmelita Defilló Sanz, a cousin of Catalan musician Pau Casals Defilló.

He studied at the National School of Fine Arts from 1949 to 1951, where he received education from Josep Gausachs, José Vela Zanetti, and Celeste Woss y Gil.

He settled in Europe after graduating, first in Spain, where he joined Spanish informalism. From 1957 to 1963 he constantly moved from different European nations until his return to Santo Domingo.

In 2015 the Fernando Peña Defilló Museum (Spanish: Museo Fernando Peña Defilló) was inaugurated in Santo Domingo’s Colonial City to spread his legacy.

== Awards and decorations ==
- Premio Esso (1964)
- Premio de pintura of the Concurso Eduardo León Jimenes (1967)
- Premio Gulf & Western (1974)
- Premio de pintura by Casa de España (1976)
- Premio Nacional de Artes Plásticas (2010).
