= Alberto Ulloa =

Dominican artist

- Born: January 1, 1950; Altamira, Dominican Republic
- Died: October 1, 2011 (aged 61); Santo Domingo, Dominican Republic
- Education: National School of Fine Arts (Santo Domingo) Real Academia de Bellas Artes de San Fernando
- Known for: Painting, sculpture, poetry
- Awards: First Prize, XIV National Biennial of Visual Arts (1979)

Alberto Ulloa (1 January 1950 – 1 October 2011) was a painter, sculptor, and poet from Altamira, Dominican Republic. He was a student of the distinguished Latin American painter Jaime Colson, who also mentored Mario Carreño, the Cuban-Chilean master. Ulloa also studied drawing with illustrator and painter Domingo Liz.

== Career ==
Ulloa participated in more than a hundred solo and collective exhibits around the world and the subject of four books that illustrate his contributions. Art historian and author, Cándido Gerón of Alberto Ulloa, Visionario Fantástico, reveals Ulloa's gift: “As colors correspond to human emotions, Ulloa can achieve an optical illusion. Color in his work is impregnated with diaphanous sensitivity. His chromatic atmospheres sometimes make us think that we are before some sort of dream, due to the inscrutable sensuality of his tones”.

Ulloa was the recipient of many prizes and awards and given the keys to the cities of Miami, FL and Jersey City, NJ. Between the years 2001 to 2004 Ulloa served as Consul General of the Dominican Republic in Spain.

== Personal life and death ==
Ulloa died from complications following surgery for pulmonary edema on 1 October 2011.

== Alberto Ulloa works in permanent collections ==
- Queen Sofia Museum, Madrid, Spain
- Royal Palace of the Honorable Don Juan Carlos I and Doña Sofía, Honorable Kings of Spain
- Spanish Museum of Contemporary Art, Madrid, Spain
- Royal Academy of San Fernando, Madrid, Spain
- Museum of Art of Ponce, Ponce, Puerto Rico
- Museum of Modern Art, Santo Domingo, Dominican Republic
- Museum of Contemporary Drawing, Santo Domingo, Dominican Republic.
- Walsh Gallery, Seton Hall University, South Orange, New Jersey, USA

Sources:- ENCYCLOPEDIA OF THE DOMINICAN VISUAL ARTS (1844-2010), Cándido Gerón, eighth edition, Volume II, June 2010. https://www.listindiario.com/ventana/2010/07/10/149756/enciclopedia-de-las-artes-visuales

== Books ==
Alberto Ulloa: Visionario Fantástico: Author: Cándido Gerón. http://www.libreroonline.com/republica-dominicana/libros/9002/geron-candido/alberto-ulloa-visionario-fantastico.html Gerón ISBN 978-9945-00-041-2

Alberto Ulloa: El Paraíso de Las Invenciones: Authors: Authors Manuel Núñez, José Enrique García, Abil Peralta Aguero, Virginia Goris y Amable López Meléndez. Published by Editora Corripio 2006 ISBN 9993455970, ISBN 978-9993455974 https://www.abebooks.com/9789993455974/Alberto-Ulloa-paraiso-invenciones-inventions-9993455970/plp

Alberto Ulloa: Tiempo de Nacer: Author: Armando Alvarez Bravo. https://books.google.com/books?id=VB6SOAAACAAJ

Alberto Ulloa: Palabras de Colores Author Antonio Fernández Spencer. Reprinted by Alberto Ulloa, Edited by Alfa y Omega, Santo Domingo, República Dominicana; 1991 https://www.amazon.com/Palabras-Colores-Alberto-Ulloa/dp/B002B69GSS

Alberto Ulloa: Author: Antonio Fernández Spencer. https://books.google.com/books/about/Alberto_Ulloa.html?id=ec_VtAEACAAJ

Al son del amor: - Alberto Ulloa: ISBN 99934-73-23-5, Editora de Colores, S.A. Santo Domingo, República Dominicana, 2003.

== Selected publications ==
- Dictionary of Universal Art, Volume V, Enciclopaedia Britannica, Spanish Version, Ed. 1989.
- History of Dominican Painting, Danilo de los Santos. https://diariodigital.com.do/2006/03/27/presentan-volumenes-memoria-de-la-pintura-dominicana.html
- Masterpieces of Dominican Painting, 1844–1994, Volumes I, II and III, Cándido Gerón. https://books.google.com.do/books/about/Masterpieces_of_Dominican_painting_1844.html?id=kqUqnQEACAAJ&redir_esc=y
- Enciclopedia de las Artes Plásticas Dominicanas, 2008.https://www.amazon.com/Enciclopedia-las-artes-pla%CC%81sticas-dominicanas/dp/9993400084

== Selected awards ==
- 1973 National School of Fine Arts, Santo Domingo, DR.
- 1974 Dominican Falconbridge Award, Santo Domingo, DR.
- 1974 First Prize for Young Painters, Dominican Radio and Television, Santo Domingo, DR.
- 1974 First Prize for Painting, Royal Bank of Canada Contest, Santo Domingo, DR.
- 1974 First Prize, National School of Fine Arts, Santo Domingo, DR.
- 1975 First Prize, International Art Biennial, Marbella, Spain.
- 1975 Second Prize Painting, Hispanic American College, Madrid, Spain.
- 1978 Adaja Prize, Avila, Spain.
- 1978 Casa de España Prize, Santo Domingo, DR.
- 1979 First Prize for Painting, XIV National Biennial of Visual Arts, Museum of Modern Art, Santo Domingo, DR.
- 1992 Fifth Centennial Prize, awarded by the Spanish State Commission for the V Centennial, International Exhibition “Twenty Paintings of America and Spain”.
- 1996 Honorary Diploma, Institute of Hispanic Culture, Miami, FL, USA.
