= Fernando Ureña Rib =

Dominican painter

- Born: Fernando Ureña Rib; 21 March 1951; La Romana, La Romana Province, Dominican Republic
- Died: 27 December 2013 (aged 62); Berlin, Germany
- Other name: Fernando Rib
- Education: Universidad Autónoma de Santo Domingo
- Occupation: Painter
- Years active: 1973–2013
- Children: Dirk Manuél Ureña Spahn y Patrick José Ureña Spahn
- Website: http://www.latinartmuseum.com/salamandra.htm (in Spanish)

Fernando Ureña Rib (21 March 1951 – 27 December 2013) was a Dominican painter, whose career spanned four decades.

Born in La Romana, La Romana Province, Rib began his career in 1973 and studied at the Universidad Autónoma de Santo Domingo. He was fluent in Spanish, English, French, German and Italian.

Fernando Ureña Rib died on 27 December 2013, aged 62, at a health center in Berlin, Germany.
