= Cultural attaché =

Kind of diplomat

A cultural attaché is a diplomat with varying responsibilities, depending on the sending state of the attaché. Historically, such posts were filled by writers and artists, giving them a steady income, and allowing them to develop their own creative work while promoting their country's culture abroad. However, many countries’ cultural attachés serve a different purpose.

== Purposes ==
=== Gulf countries ===
The purpose of the Gulf countries’ cultural attachés is to preside over the post-secondary education of their nationals, especially those who are state-sponsored to study abroad or those in educational programs created by the state. As such, these cultural attachés work under their countries’ equivalent to a ministry of education rather than a ministry of culture or a ministry of Foreign Affairs. In other words, where an ambassador is the head of mission sent by the ministry of foreign affairs to serve the relations between the host country and the sending country, a cultural attaché in the Gulf is the head of mission sent by the ministry of education to oversee the education of the nationals of the sending country in the host country. This head-of-mission-status gives the Gulf states' cultural attachés high-ranking diplomatic status as opposed to other countries in which the role of cultural attachés is not as important nor vital.

For instance, the Saudi Arabian cultural attaché could be sent by the Ministry of Education to supervise and manage medical training programs that train Saudi Arabian medical students in universities and hospitals abroad (as well as performing the aforementioned responsibilities of overseeing other state-sponsored students and programs).

=== United States ===
American cultural attachés have historically been known to be spies posing as diplomats. While this tactic was used primarily during the Cold War against Eastern European states allied with the Soviet Union, the United States has sent spies posing as diplomats to Latin America, the Middle East, and North Africa. This is a highly effective intelligence tactic because cultural attachés have a very broad purpose and are covered by diplomatic immunity, protected by international law should they be accused of espionage.
