= Juan Andújar =

Dominican artist (born 1986)

- Born: 9 August 1986 (age 39); Loma de Cabrera, Dominican Republic
- Known for: Plastic arts
- Notable work: Marina

Juan Andújar (born 1986) is a Dominican contemporary artist. He is known for his modern paintings, often inspired in the ocean and rural life.

== Biography ==
Juan Andújar was born in 1986 in Loma de Cabrera, Dominican Republic. His family was full of artistic tradition, and his father, José Andújar, was the director of the music academy at Academia de Música Emilio Prud'Homme in Loma de Cabrera; his uncle Juan Plutarco Andújar is a painter. In Loma de Cabrera, Juan Andújar studies music while cultivates plastic arts. There, he participated, from 2000 to 2004, on the exposition "Unidos por el arte" (United for arts) with other local artist. Later, he joined the National School of Fine Arts (Escuela Nacional de Bellas Artes) in Santo Domingo to study plastic arts.

== Exhibitions ==
Juan has participated in several individual and group exhibitions at local and international localities.

=== Solo exhibitions ===
- Serena Mare, 2008, Mesa Fine Art, Santo Domingo.
- Estímulos de Vida (honoring his uncle Juan Plutarco), 2014, Shanell Art Gallery, Malecon Center, Santo Domingo

=== Group exhibitions ===
- Unidos por el arte, 2001, 2002, 2003, and 2004, Loma de Cabrera.
- Exposición anual Casa de Teatro, 2005, Santo Domingo.
- Arte Caribeño, 2005, San Juan, Puerto Rico.
- Exposición Profundo Fundación Mir, 2005, Casa de Campo, La Romana.
- 65 Artistas Latinoamericanos. Celebración 30 años de la Galería Nader, 2006, Santo Domingo.
- Arte siempre Arte; 3ra edición, 2006, Galería Nader, Santo Domingo.
- Artistas Dominicanos en Embajada Dominicana, Brussels, Belgium.
- Rutas de los Murales, 2007, Hermanas Mirabal.
- Murales de Arte Dominicano, 2006, Malecón Center, Santo Domingo.

== Awards ==
Juan Andújar has received several awards, including:

- Medalla de Reconocimiento por el Cabildo del Distrito Nacional, Santo Domingo.
- Premio Regional de la Juventud (desarrollo cultural).
- Distinción de honor Mural Malecón Center.
- Premio Nuestra Señora de la Altagracia, 2005, Loma de Cabrera.
- Premio Casa de Teatro, 2004, Santo Domingo.
