= Diego José Hilaris =

Dominican painter

- Born: 1700–1799 possibly Higuey, Dominican Republic
- Died: 1800–1830; Dominican Republic
- Known for: Painting

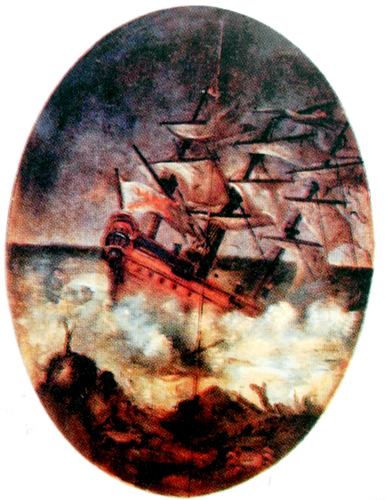
Hilaris El milagro

Diego José Hilaris (17?? - 18??) was a Dominican painter during the colonial period and one of the few colonial artists whose works and legacy survive today. Believed to be born in Higüey, his series of paintings cover miracles of the Virgin Mary, or Virgen de la Altagracia, throughout the colony. Hilaris's paintings can be described as naïve art, as he was not formally trained, though they are considered significant in their historical, religious, anthropological, and artistic value for depicting costumbrist scenes during the country’s colonial era.

== Biography ==
Although no dates concerning his biography survive, it is known he was a criollo born most likely in Higüey during the mid 1700s with an estimated year of death believed to be in the early 1800s. Hilaris, completely self-taught, painted his series, known as medallions for their oval shape, approximately between the years 1760 and 1778; of the 27 whose existence is known, 10 have been lost. Each medallion measures more than one meter high and 66 centimeters wide and are preserved in the Altagracia Museum located in Higüey.

According to the story, Hilaris was commissioned by the church to paint a series for the island’s Altragraciano miracles, and after initially declining, he became ill; only after praying to the Virgin Mary did he regain his health and eventually agree to paint the works. The medallion Autoretrato con santuario y montañas de Higüey is a self portrait depicting this event. The artist looks towards the church of Saint Dionisio in Higüey, one of the oldest churches in the Americas, while in the back mountains, several shacks and palms are shown, while a man riding a donkey climbs a trail. The cult of the Virgin of Altagracia is very old and has its origins in the earliest years of the colony, and she is considered the protective mother of Dominicans of Catholic faith to this day.

The medallion Los señores del cabildo de Santo Domingo is considered the richest and most complex of the series, for its composition, number of characters and for featuring a landscape layout. It depicts part of one of the oldest miracles, chronicled by the cleric Alcocer in 1650: taking place in Santo Domingo along the Ozama river bank, with the wall gates of San Diego and the Columbus Alcazar in the background, it depicts the moment when the citizens of the city realized that the significant painting of the Virgin Mary was nowhere to be found and the box that should have contained her image empty.

== Gallery ==
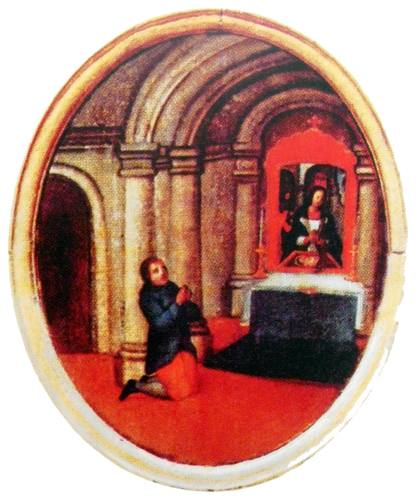
Hilaris Nuestra Señora

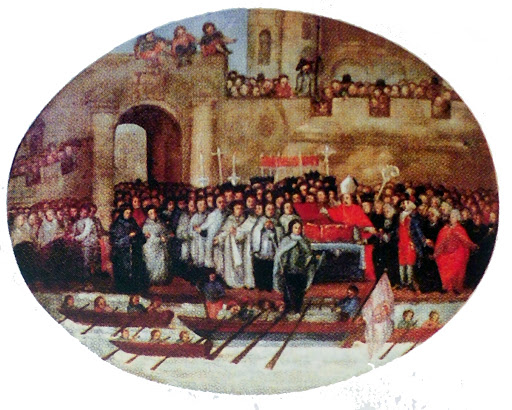
Medallón de los señores del cabildo de Santo Domingo

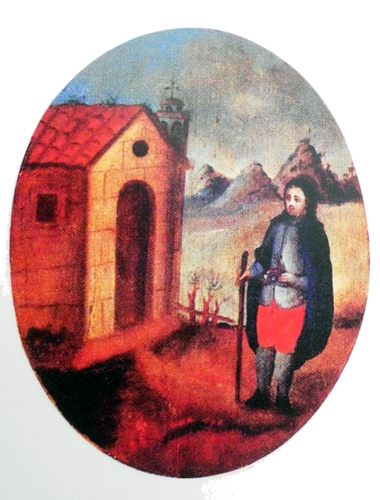
Hilaris Autorretrato

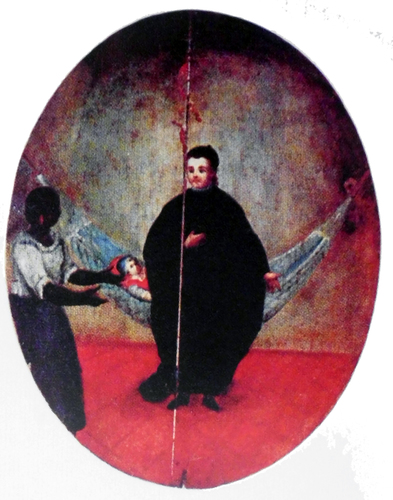
Hilaris El niño asfixiado

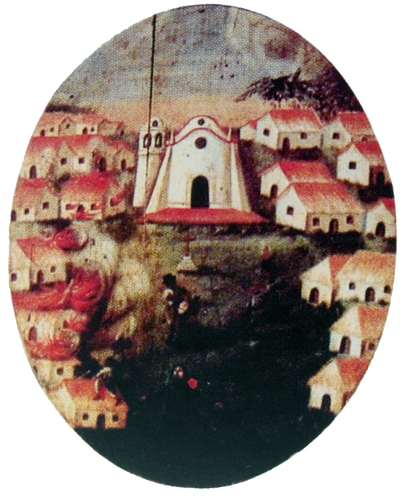
Hilaris Santuario
