= Enrique García-Godoy =

Dominican painter and journalist

Enrique García Godoy
- Born: 1886; La Vega, Dominican Republic
- Died: 1947 (aged 60–61); La Vega, Dominican Republic
- Known for: Art education, Painting

Enrique García–Godoy (1886–1947) was a Dominican painter and journalist. Godoy's work ranged from portraits, landscapes, and nudes to religious matters, costumbrist scenes, and historical themes. Godoy was also a journalist, providing analysis of international politics for various publications, including Listin Diario, one of the leading newspapers of the country.

He was born in 1886 in La Vega, Dominican Republic. In 1924, he traveled to Italy, serving as Dominican consul, later returning to La Vega in 1930, where he establishes an art school and reaches national renown as an artist. His academy of Drawing and Painting went on to influence a generation of naturalist painters, which includes María Lora de Dalmasí, Bolívar Berrido and his nephew Darío Suro, among others.

He died in La Vega on November 13, 1947.

== Biography ==
Born in 1886, Godoy belonged to a family of high social and intellectual standing; his father Federico García-Godoy (1857-1924) was a prolific writer, widely recognized in the country, with also many connections throughout Latin America, and his mother was Rosa Clara Jiménez. From an early age, Godoy's interest in the arts led him to take art lessons in his hometown and take part in his first exhibition in 1907, organized by the Dominican Athenaeum.

He was approximately forty years old when he moved to Italy, serving as Dominican consul, based in Genoa, in the period 1924-1930, during which Benito Mussolini ruled with a fascist regime. Upon returning to his native La Vega, Godoy founded the Academy of Drawing and Painting, influential in the evolution of the naturalist school in the country. He is also the first Dominican artist to formulate an aesthetic theory, about which there is knowledge; with the title Geometric Canon, aesthetic principle of the morphological conformation of the human body, it is a text written between 1924-1944 and whose manuscripts his daughter Raquel has transcribed and saved. It is an illustrated work with more than 70 color drawings.

== Gallery ==
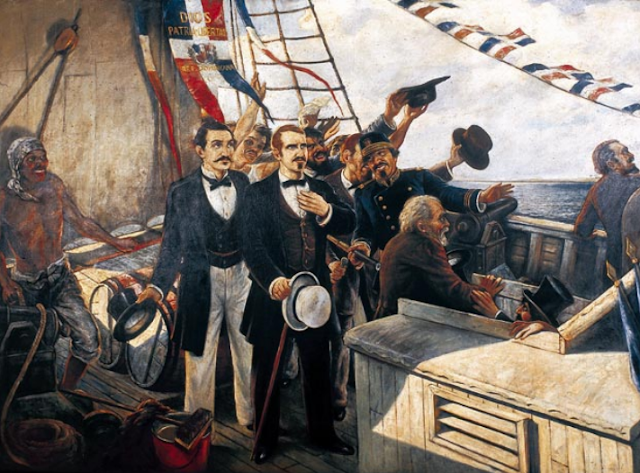
Regreso de Duarte a la Patria Libre
