= Edward Telleria =

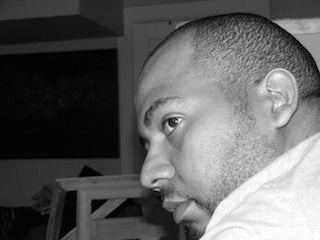
- Edward Telleria
- Born: Edward Robert Castro Telleria; 1974 (age 51–52); Santo Domingo, Dominican Republic
- Education: National School of Fine Arts (Santo Domingo)
- Known for: Painting
- Website: edwardtelleria.com

Edward Telleria (born 1974) is an artist from the Dominican Republic. He is known for his paintings of eyes, horses and roses.

== Early life and education ==
He was born in 1974 in Santo Domingo, Dominican Republic. Telleria received a Bachelor of Fine Arts in 1994 and a Master of Fine Arts in 1996 from the Escuela Nacional de Bellas Artes in Santo Domingo, Dominican Republic.

== Career ==
Telleria enrolled in La Escuela Nacional de Bellas Artes in Santo Domingo at the age of 15. During his time at La Escuela Nacional de Bellas Artes he won first prize for painting, the highest honor, two years in a row.

Over the past twelve years, Edward has held eight solo exhibitions, both in the Dominican Republic and in the United States.

Edward has been showing his work in the United States since 2007 at Cortile Gallery in Provincetown, MA. He had a solo show at the Cortile Gallery in September 2007. Edward participated in a collective exhibition at Brookline Arts Center in March 2009 and appeared on the front page of the Lifestyle/Arts section of the Brookline Tab as a result of the event. Edward's work is also shown at Mesa Fine Art in the Dominican Republic.

Edward has received various awards for his painting in the Dominican Republic. His artwork is included in the Dominican Encyclopedia of Plastic and Visual Artists.

== Exhibitions ==
=== Solo ===
- 1997 – Benetton Café, Plaza Central. "Deseos" ("Desires"). Santo Domingo, Dominican Republic.
- 1997 – National School of Fine Arts (ENBA). "Reflejos del Alma" ("Reflections of the Soul"). Santo Domingo, Dominican Republic.
- 2000 – Dominican School of Artistas Plásticos (CODAP). "Solo Para Pensadores" ("Only for Thinkers"). Santo Domingo, Dominican Republic.
- 2001 – Palma Cana. "Edward Telleria". Santo Domingo, Dominican Republic.
- 2002 – Collage Bar. "Edward Telleria". Santo Domingo, Dominican Republic.
- 2004 – Museo del Hombre Dominicano. "Experiencia Taina" ("Taina Experience"). 31 Anniversary. Santo Domingo, Dominican Republic.
- 2006 – Museo de las Casas Reales. "En Homenaje al Ego" ("Tribute to the Ego"). Santo Domingo, Dominican Republic.
- 2007 – Cortile Gallery. Provincetown, Massachusetts, United States.
- 2008 – Funglode. "Bestias y Rosas" ("Beasts and Roses"). Santo Domingo, Dominican Republic.
- 2010 – Mesa Fine Art. "La pasion del alma" ("The Passion of Alma"). Santo Domingo, Dominican Republic.
- 2013 – Gallery 360, Northeastern University, ("Identidad Caribeña"), Boston, MA USA.
- 2015 – Mesa Fine Art. "Dragon Flowers". Santo Domingo, Dominican Republic.

=== Group ===
- 1990–1996 – National School of Fine Arts, end of year exposition (ENBA). Santo Domingo, Dominican Republic.
- 1998 – Creative Workshop for Young Artists. "Calle Arte 98". Santo Domingo, Dominican Republic.
- 1998 – XXI National Biennial of Visual Arts. Santo Domingo, Dominican Republic.
- 1999 – Festival of Total Art. Jarabacoa, Dominican Republic.
- 2000 – Footprints of Dominican Artistas Palsticos, permanent mural, Ala Justo Susana. Museo del Hombre. Santo Domingo, Dominican Republic.
- 2000 – Foundation Guayasamín. Quito, Ecuador
- 2000 – United Nations; ALAI Afrocimarron. Festival of the Caribbean of Santiago of Cuba. Cuba.
- 2000 – Wild African Perception, UNESCO. Santo Domingo, Dominican Republic.
- 2002 – Classic Caribbean Art Gallery+Studio. Erosxwek Nanosmek. Curaçao.
- 2002 – "Compositions". 10 Dominican Artists. Curaçao.
- 2002 – "Determinant". Exhibition Parallel, IV Biennial of the Caribbean (CODAP). Santo Domingo, Dominican Republic.
- 2002 – "Pinta La Paz" Painting of the Américas, Casa de Teatro. Santo Domingo, Dominican Republic.
- 2003 – Collective Exhibition "Tribute to Milan Suero and Ramon Oviedo". Dominican School of Artistas Plásticos (CODAP). Santo Domingo, Dominican Republic.
- 2003 – "The Space between Artistas Plasticos". Forum Pedro Mir, Libreria Cuesta. Santo Domingo, Dominican Republic.
- 2004 – Collective "Tribute to Candido Bidó and Guillo Perez". Museum of the Dominican Family of Century XIX, House of Toasting. Santo Domingo, Dominican Republic.
- 2004 – Encuentro de Artistas Plasticos. Factory of Art Ramon Sandoval. Santo Domingo, DominIcan Republic.
- 2004 – "Glances", Selection of Honor. Santo Domingo, Dominican Republic.
- 2004 – Joint Line of Vision of Contemporary Art "Long Play". House of UNESCO. Santo Domingo, Dominican Republic.
- 2005 – Encuentro de Artistas "Foundation Almonte". Santo Domingo, Dominican Republic.
- 2005 – International Traveling Exposition, Francisco Nader, Latin American Art. Santo Domingo, Dominican Republic.
- 2008–2009 – Brookline Arts Center. "Minot Rose Garden Exhibition". Brookline, Massachusetts, United States.
- 2008 – Cortile Gallery. Provincetown, Massachusetts, United States.
- 2010 – Centro Cultural de la Raza. "Matices de las Americas". San Diego, California, United States.

=== Public auctions ===
- 2007 – Painting auctioned and sold at the Junior League of Boston Annual Charity Ball. Boston, Massachusetts, United States.
- 2009 – Painting auctioned at Massachusetts Society for the Prevention of Cruelty to Children. Boston, Massachusetts, United States.

=== Collections ===
- Museo de Arte Moderno, Santo Domingo, Dominican Republic
- Museo de las Casas Reales, Santo Domingo, Dominican Republic
- Museo del Hombre Dominicano, Santo Domingo, Dominican Republic
- Dominican Embassy, Jamaica

=== Affiliations ===
- 1999–2001 – President, Dominican School of Artistas Plásticos (CODAP). Santo Domingo, Dominican Republic.
- 2002–2004 – Vice President, Dominican School of Artistas Plásticos (CODAP). Santo Domingo, Dominican Republic.
- 2004 – Member, Association the International of Artistas Plásticos (AIAP) UNESCO. Santo Domingo, Dominican Republic.
- 2005 – Advisor to President of the Dominican School of Artistas Plásticos (CODAP). Santo Domingo, Dominican Republic.
