= Kamalky Laureano =

- Born: 1983 (age 42–43); Dominican Republic
- Occupation: Painter
- Known for: Hyperrealist paintings

Kamalky Laureano (born 1983) is a Dominican-born Mexican hyperrealist painter. Living in Mexico City since 2006, he has made his life and work in that country.

== Education ==
Laureano was accepted into the school, Altos De Chavon School of Design in 2004 and affiliated with Parsons(NY). Laureano continued to produce work in Mexico and was able to win scholarships to continue supporting the Faculty of Arts and Design of the National Autonomous University of Mexico.

== Artworks ==
Laureano explains that he takes inspiration from the world through his perspective. He believes that art imitates life and that art should be able to have a life of its own in many ways. The paintings look like high-resolution photos at first glance. These large detailed portraits include textures such as skin, freckles, and pores. He can depict faces clearly while also including shading and blurs. These photo-realistic portraits and landscapes which are large-scale acrylic on canvas. THe uses art to communicate the conscious living of the world around us and continues to work as an artist located in Mexico City since 2006.

=== Portraits ===
His most recognized work is the hyper-realistic portraits, made with incredibly strong details in eyes, skin, and hair textures in acrylic.

== Exhibitions ==
=== Group exhibition ===
==== An Island on Another Map ====
Since Laureano has been creating art in Mexico. He was one of five Dominican artists that were offered to participate for an exhibition aiming to present the collaborating cultures and the Dominican contemporary art that was being produced in Mexico in 2021. This exhibition included other artists that were living and producing art in Mexico, America Rodriguez, Daysi Baes, Niurka Guzman, Madeline Jimenez, Dorit Weil, Jose Francisco Baez Ferreira, Javier Reyes, and Mexican guest Jose Luis Bustamante.

===== Human Condition =====
In 2013 Galeria Tiro an Blanco, located in Guadalajara held an exhibition. Jean Berard, a photographer works were displayed alongside Laureano's larger paintings. The exhibition focused on hyperrealist artists that are able to capture humans to give the illusion of realism and to take a closer look into human characteristics.

==== Other ====
In 2014 he was able to participate in these exhibitions, Light Field, Beauty is in the Eye of the Beholder, and Ritual Mother, each at Primo Piano Living Gallery in Lecce, Italy. Laureano’s work has been showcased in different countries, including Italy, Argentina, France, and Mexico. He was featured in the Paul Mahder Gallery in the past and his work has been offered at auctions multiple times.
