= Amaya Salazar =

Dominican artist (born 1951)

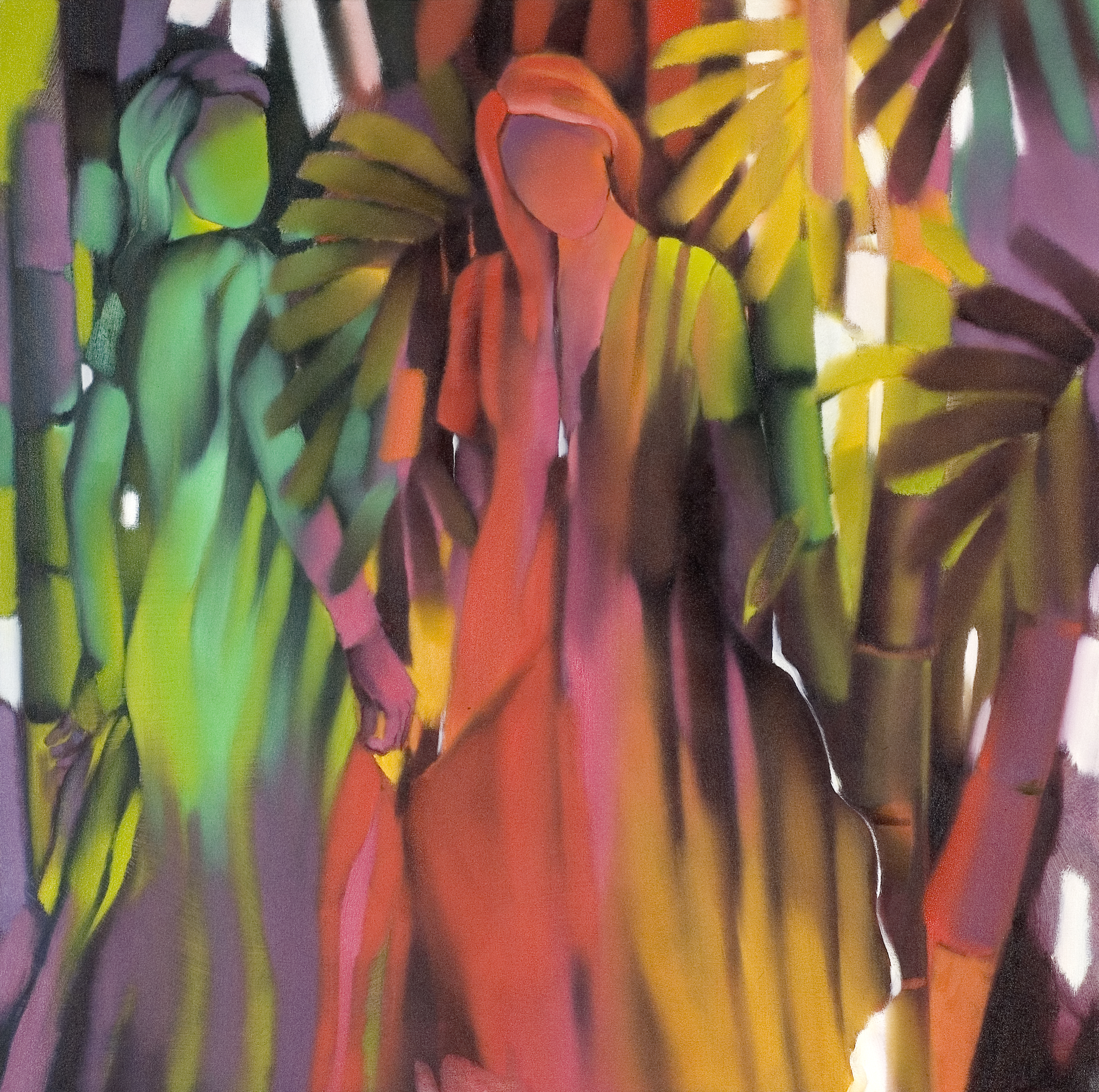
- Amaya Salazar
- Born: Amaya Salazar; 1951 (age 74–75); Santo Domingo, Dominican Republic
- Education: Academia Artium, Madrid; School of the Museum of Fine Arts, Boston
- Known for: Painting, Sculpture, Drawing

Amaya Salazar (born 1951, Santo Domingo, Dominican Republic) is a Dominican artist and painter. She known for her faceless personas that inhabit mystical and magical environments where light and the Antillean flora are present.

== Biography ==
Amaya Salazar studied at the Academia Artium, Madrid, Spain and at the School of Fine Arts, Boston, MA.

Salazar is mostly inspired by the female form and by mother and child images. She captures those intimate moments where women are escaping the reality of life and entering the warm of the Caribbean light.

Light and flora play an important role in Salazar's work. In her work, the rays of the sun and moon create kaleidoscope of tones throughout the landscape. In the nightscapes the palette turns dark almost black, but there is always an internal light that shines. Her brighter works give us the different tonalities that the sun create as it warms the landscape. The flora is an integral part of Salazar’s work. The banana leaves, the palm trees, the bamboo trunks are part of the environment that surround the characters; in some cases they are the only element of the piece.

Salazar also works in bronze, steel, and marble, as well as creates charcoal on paper drawings and water color and Chinese ink on paper.

Her work can be found in important collections worldwide. There are two monographs about the artist’s work and a third one is being produced.

== Collections holding Salazar works ==
- ABN/AMOR, Miami, Florida
- Admiral Club American Airlines, Santo Domingo, DR
- Art in Embassies Program, Department of State, USA
- Banco Popular, Santo Domingo, DR
- Bilbao Biscay, Kutxa, Bilbao, Spain
- BPD International Bank, New York
- Caja de Ahorros de Vitoria, Vitoria, Spain.
- Compañía Dominicana de Teléfonos, (CODETEL), Santo Domingo, DR
- Latin Art Museum
- Museo de Arte Moderno, Santo Domingo, DR
- Museo Hermanas Mirabal, Salcedo, DR.
- The National Museum of Catholic Art and History, New York, NY
- Voluntariado del Museo de las Casas Reales, Santo Domingo, DR

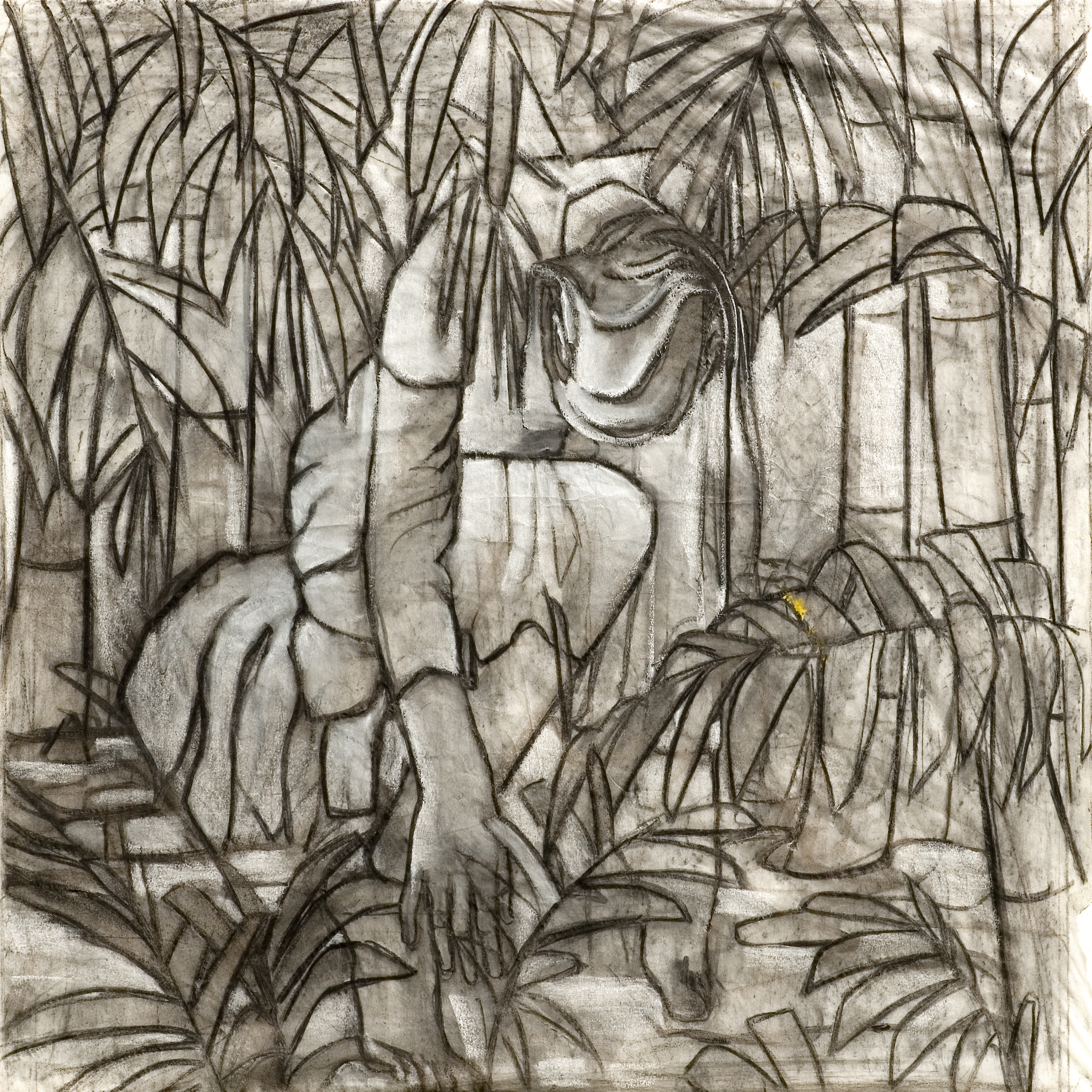
Unscathed Earth (2007)charcoal on butter paper, 32 x 32 in.
