= Paul Giudicelli =

- Born: 1921; San Pedro de Macorís, Dominican Republic
- Died: 1965 (aged 43–44); Santo Domingo, Dominican Republic
- Education: National School of Fine Arts
- Known for: Painting
- Movement: Abstract art
- Spouse: Mrs. Vidal (m. 1937–div. circa 1945)
- Children: Pablo Giudicelli Vidal, Ángel Giudicelli Vidal, Frida Giudicelli de Viñals

Paul Giudicelli Palmieri (1921–1965) was an abstract painter from the Dominican Republic.

== Early life and education ==
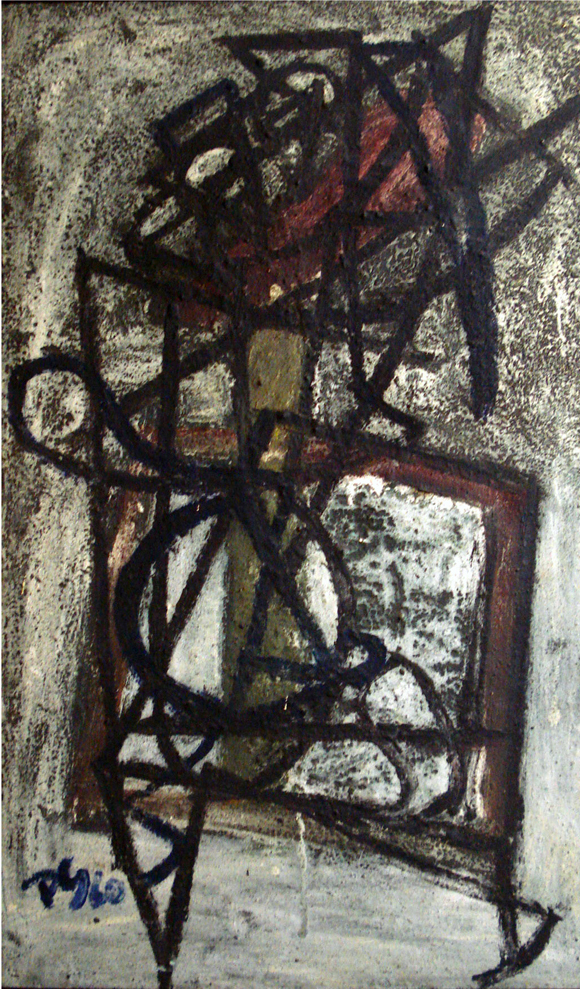
Hombre comiendo caña

He was born at the Ingenio Porvenir, in San Pedro de Macorís, Dominican Republic to Corsican immigrants. Giudicelli spent a few years of his early childhood in Europe, but returned to the Dominican Republic in the 1930s, living in Santo Domingo. In 1937, being aged just 16, Giudicelli married with a girl surnamed Vidal; they had 2 boys: Paul Giudicelli and Ángel Giudicelli. Although he showed a talent and enthusiasm for art in his youth, it was not until 1948, at the age of 28, that he began formal training at the National School of Fine Arts. He graduated from the school in 1951. In a second marriage he begat a girl: Frida.

== Career ==

Soon after graduating, Giudicelli participated in the São Paulo Biennial and the National Biennial (Dominican Republic) in 1952. He held his first solo exhibition in 1953 at the National Gallery of Fine Arts, showing 70 works. Art critic Horia Tanasecu gave the exhibition a very favorable review, stating that the artist had "extraordinary talent" and brought "new energy to the national art scene". Tanasecu also noted the incredible variety of stylistic influences in the artist's work, including Cubism, Abstraction, Impressionism, Symbolism, Expressionism, Surrealism, Fauvism, Naturalism and Academicism.

Giudicelli participated in group exhibitions in Barcelona (1956) and Switzerland (1957), as well as other National Biennials in the Dominican Republic. His second solo exhibition was held in 1957, and his third in 1959. The artist also began painting murals in 1959, receiving commissions for various public buildings.

In 1959, Giudicelli was offered a grant to study mural painting in France, but was denied a passport from the Trujillo dictator government. Giudicelli's son Pablo, an embassy employee in Costa Rica, had refused to follow an order from the dictator, creating negative effects for the entire family. As a result of the political scandal, in 1960 Giudicelli also lost the positions he had recently obtained as both professor and vice director of the National School of Fine Arts, but was reinstated in 1961 after the dictator's death.

== Death ==
Giudicelli continued his successful painting career until he died of cancer, aged 43–44, in East Santo Domingo.

== See also ==
- List of Dominican painters
