= Gilberto Hernández Ortega =

Dominican Artist

- Born: 21 December 1923; Baní, Peravia Province, Dominican Republic
- Died: 23 October 1979 (aged 55); Santo Domingo, Dominican Republic
- Education: National School of Fine Arts
- Known for: Painting
- Movement: Surrealism

Gilberto Hernández Ortega (21 December 1923 – 23 October 1979) was an artist from the Dominican Republic. He is considered a leading painter of his generation.

== Early life and education ==
He was born in Baní, Peravia Province, in 1923 but was raised in Santo Domingo. He was great-grandson of Pierre André Frier, a Frenchman.

Ortega first studied art under Celeste Woss y Gil at her private academy. Undecided about his career, he studied engineering for more than two years before committing to pursuing painting. He enrolled in the National School of Fine Arts, where he studied under Woss y Gil once again, as well as Josep Gausachs and George Hausdorf. Ortega was particularly influenced by Gausachs, maintaining a close relationship with the older artist until Gausachs's death in 1959. In addition to Gausachs, he worked closely with Jaime Colson and Clara Ledesma. Other sources of inspiration included Cuban artists Wifredo Lam and Mario Carreño Morales.

== Career ==
Untitled, oil on canvas, 1976 (Museo Bellapart, Santo Domingo)

In 1946, Ortega had his first solo exhibition, exhibiting 63 paintings and drawings. He also exhibited abroad, with his first international solo exhibition being held in Caracas, Venezuela, in 1951. Other international shows included exhibitions in the United States, Spain, Argentina, Brazil, Israel and Taiwan. In addition, he was awarded prizes in national Biennial art events in 1952, 1958 and 1974.

He also taught art for many years. Ortega became a professor at the National School of Fine Arts in 1946 and was named vice director in 1954. In 1966, he opened a private art school in Santo Domingo. During his many years of teaching, Ortega had a significant influence on major Dominican artists, including Ada Balcácer, Iván Tovar, Ramón Oviedo and Elsa Núñez.

While primarily a Surrealist, he also experimented with Expressionism and Abstraction. Most of Ortega's paintings are figurative, depicting distorted human forms. Although dark colors such as blues, violets, grays, greens, browns and black predominate, his palette is often enlivened with vibrant yellows, oranges and reds.

== Death ==
Ortega died in Santo Domingo in 1979.

== See also ==
- List of Dominican painters
