= Jaime Colson =

Dominican artist

- Born: 13 January 1901; Puerto Plata Province, Dominican Republic
- Died: 20 November 1975 (age 74); Santo Domingo, Distrito Nacional, Dominican Republic
- Known for: Painting, Art education, Poetry, Playwrighting
- Movement: Modernism, Cubism, Surrealism, Neohumanism
- Spouse: Toyo Kurimoto (m. 1945–1975)
- Parents: Antonio González (father); Juana Maria Colson Tradwell (mother)
- Relatives: Jayme Colson (uncle)

Jaime Antonio Gumercindo González Colson (13 January 1901 – 20 November 1975) was a Dominican modernist painter, writer, and playwright born in Tubagua, Puerto Plata in 1901. He is remembered as one of the most important Dominican artists of the 20th century, and as one of the leading figures of the modernist movement in 20th century Dominican art, along with Yoryi Morel, Dario Suro, and Celeste Woss y Gil.

His travels to Spain and France in the early 20th century led to his experimenting with Cubism, Surrealism and other avant-garde styles. He struck up friendships with artists like Maruja Mallo, Rafael Barradas and Salvador Dalí in Spain, and in Paris, came to know Pablo Picasso and Georges Braque, masters of the cubist school that influenced his style. In 1934, he decided to leave Europe for Mexico to teach art, where he befriended artists like José Clemente Orozco and Diego Rivera.

After leaving Mexico in 1938, Colson became professor at the art academy in Havana, Cuba to teach his "cubismo neo-humanista". The Cuban artist Mario Carreño was one of his pupils.

In May 1938, Colson held an art exhibition for the first time in his country, in Santo Domingo, at that time, Ciudad Trujillo. Years later, dictator Rafael Trujillo would go on to appoint him Director of the School of Fine Arts in 1950. Colson would go on to resign less than two years later as a result of the repressive regime.

Colson's art has mostly been described as Cubist, Surrealist, and Neohumanist. He is best known for his development of Neohumanismo (or Neohumanism) and Caribbean cubism or Afro-cubism. His most notable works include Merengue (1938), and his series Figuras Metafisicas (1930). Colson also wrote poetry and theatrical works.

Colson was a devoted Catholic his entire life and married his companion, Toyo Kurimoto, of Japan, in a Catholic ceremony. He died of throat cancer in Santo Domingo on November 20, 1975. Many of his works are displayed in the Museo Bellapart in Santo Domingo.

== Early life and education ==
Colson was born in Tubagua, Puerto Plata, Dominican Republic on 13 January 1901, to parents Antonio González, a Spanish merchant, and Juana María Colson Tradwell, who was born in Puerto Plata and was the daughter of American immigrants. His maternal grandparents were Henry Colson and Mary Eliza Tradwell, Anglo-American immigrants from Boston. He received his early education in Santo Domingo, and showed an interest in art at an early age.

Following the encouragement of his mother, Colson travelled to Barcelona in 1919 to study art. There he studied at the Barcelona School of Fine Arts under the tutelage of painters Cecilio Pla, Julio Romero de Torres, and Pedro Carbonell. During this time the young Jaime González Colson decided to go by his maternal surname and drop his paternal surname, considering it too common. His earliest works were influenced by Noucentisme, the prevailing artistic and literary aesthetic in Barcelona at the time, as well other avant-garde movements of the era. In 1920, he moved to Madrid and from 1920 to 1923, he attended the San Fernando School of Fine Arts in Madrid, where he took classes with José Moreno Carbonero, Joaquín Sorolla y Bastidas, and José Garnelo. After his formative years in Madrid, he returned to Barcelona where he was presented at the Real Círculo Artístico, by Santiago Rusiñol and Joaquin Terruella Matilla.

He lived in Paris from 1924 to 1934, where he discovered the works of Pablo Picasso and Giorgio De Chirico, which greatly influenced his paintings from the 30's-40's. During this time, Colson dove deeper into Cubist and Surrealist aesthetics, evoking a return to the classic and an irreality.

== Artistic career ==
Colson suffered economic hardships in Paris and sales of his works were minimal. Following suggestions from Dominican writer Pedro Henríquez Ureña and Mexican poet Maples Arce, he left for Mexico in 1934 with hopes of improving his situation; there, Colson held a personal exhibition, sponsored by the Secretary of Education and began teaching at the Workers' School of Art. During this period, Colson also devoted himself to illustration, such as in the book Eco by the poet and friend Elías Nandino, published in 1934, whose black and white surrealistic illustrations of male torsos and genitalia, bleeding wounds and mutilated organs were celebrated at the time. In Mexico, Colson befriended María Izquierdo, José Gorostiza, Antonin Artaud, Wifredo Lam and his Cuban student, Mario Carreño. In 1938, Colson left Mexico, traveling to Havana, Cuba, accompanied by Mario Carreño. He lived and taught there for a few months, and held an art exhibition, before shortly returning to his native country after twenty years of absence.

On May 26, 1938, Colson arrived in Santo Domingo and held his first exhibition in the country at the Dominican Athenaeum Soon after arriving, he was commissioned by the Trujillo government for a portrait of the dictator. Though Colson insisted on doing it from life, he had only one interview with the Trujillo before never meeting again. His first sketch which portrayed Trujillo too realistically, that is, presenting him as the mulatto that he was, was rejected. Colson immediately restarted but ultimately never finished the portrait. Convinced that his artistic career would be stifled under such a repressive regime, Colson decided to return to Paris in 1938.

The next year in Paris he exhibited at the prestigious Berheim-Jeune Gallery ten paintings and drawings, with artists Mario Carreño and Max Jiménez. However, as a result of World War II, Colson relocated to Barcelona. There, he completed numerous works including a set of murals on the island of Mallorca.

In 1950, Colson returned to Dominican Republic and became director of the National School of Fine Arts. However, in 1952 he resigned from his post without having served two years in office. Following his resignation, Colson illustrated the Dominican author Tomás Hernández Franco’s book Cibao, with drawings portraying the daily life of cibaeños. He also made a well-known portrait of him there.

In 1957 he traveled to Caracas, Venezuela, to hold an exhibition. Colson had already presented his work in Venezuela at the Valencia International Painting Exhibition, which was held in commemoration of the 400th anniversary of its founding. On this occasion he had brought a multitude of works to be shown at the Museum of Fine Arts in Caracas, however, after the interviews in the press announcing the exhibition, the general director of Fine Arts did not approve Colson’s works. The reason is unknown, possibly due to political issues, including the animosity of the Venezuelan government against Trujillo. Afterwards, Colson practically fled to Haiti with very few works, leaving behind a huge collection of paintings to the ambassador of his country, Brea Messina, including the entire series of "La Catharsis" and the best of his period of "reviving cubism" that have largely disappeared.

== Style ==
Colson’s works blend Cubism, Surrealism, Symbolism, Expressionism, and Neoclassicism into a style described as Neohumanism that he became known for. During his years in Paris, Colson got to know the work of Giorgio De Chirico and Pablo Picasso who were two of his biggest influences. The influence of the De Chirico can be seen in his works from the 30s and 40s, in the use of perspective and scenography, themes towards the metaphysical and surrealist, the return to the classical, unreal atmospheres, and the reinterpretations of Mediterranean mythology. All of this penetrated deeply into Colson's aesthetic. The mystery and loneliness that emanate from De Chirico's paintings can also be seen in Colson’s work.

In addition, Colson was influenced by the readings of Sigmund Freud (1856-1939), whose dream analysis had an impact on Colson’s more surrealistic paintings. Religious or mystical themes were also repeatedly explored in his various ecclesiastical murals and paintings, representing biblical and hagiographic subjects like El compte Arnau, one of his most colorful and famous works. Other works include Baquiní y la ciguapa del Camú from 1949, which shows a ritual wake for a dead infant.

Colson in his 1962 painting Los heroes de la calle Espaillat, not only perfectly captures all his evolution, from cubism, religious painting, fresco painting and neo-humanism, but also, due to its theme, delves into the social and the political environment of the time, that paid tribute to the student revolutionaries who were arrested, tortured, and killed by the dictatorship, on October 20, 1961.

== Death ==
He dedicated the final years of his life to continuing his work and teaching the techniques of mural painting. Colson died of pulmonary edema in Santo Domingo on November 20 1975, aged 74; he suffered from throat cancer because of his assiduous smoking habit. He was married to Japanese painter and sculptor Toyo Yutaka Karimoto.

A retrospective of his work was held at Museo Bellapart in Santo Domingo in 2008.
