= Celeste Woss y Gil =

Dominican painter

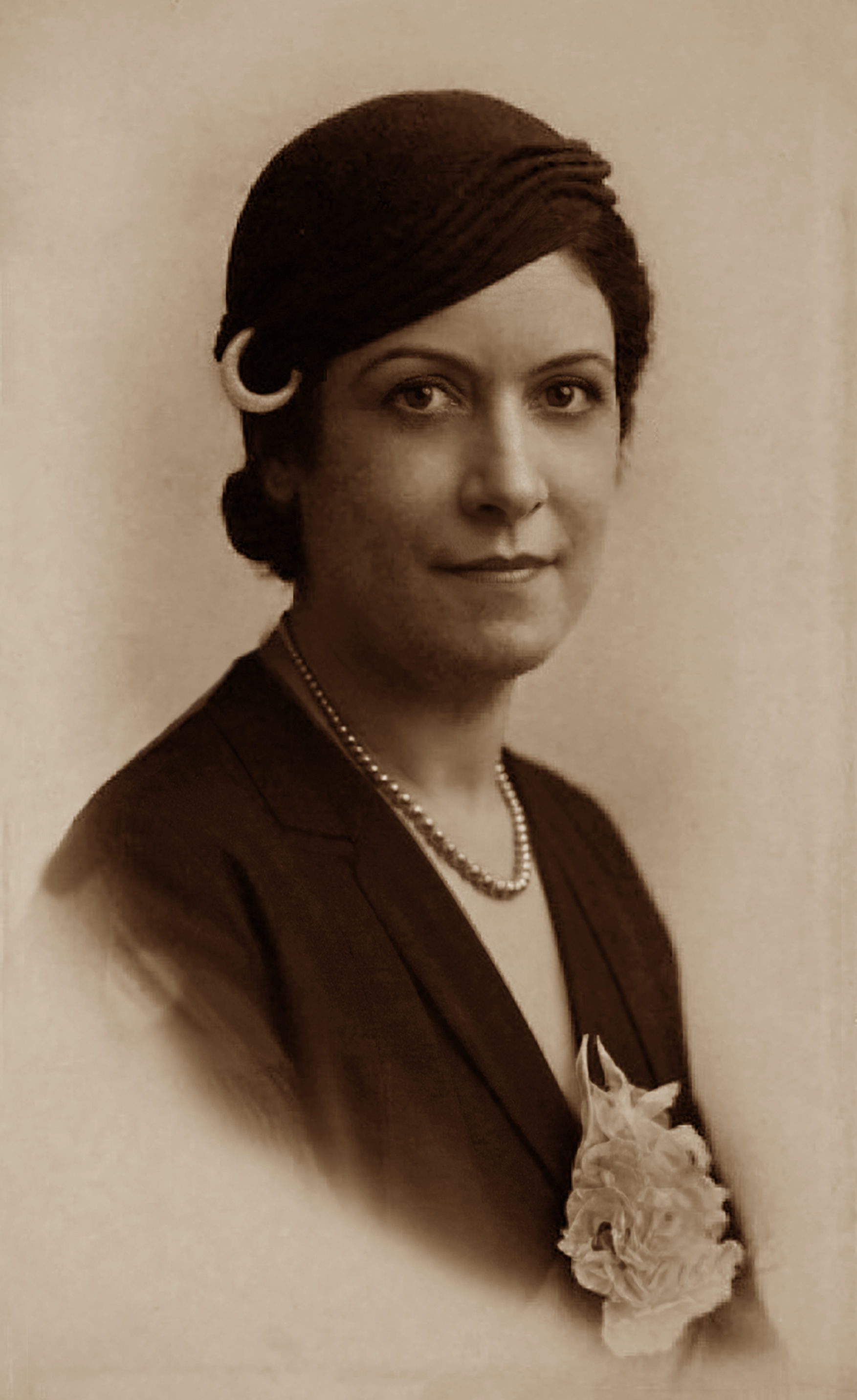
- Born: May 5, 1891; Santo Domingo, Dominican Republic
- Died: 1985 (aged 94–95); Santo Domingo, Dominican Republic
- Education: Painting Academy under José Joaquín Tejada; Art Students League of New York; National Academy of Design
- Known for: Art education, Painting

Celeste Agustina Woss y Gil (5 May 1891 – 1985) was a Dominican painter, educator, and feminist activist, remembered as one of the most influential Dominican artists from the 20th century. Born in Santo Domingo and daughter to former president Alejandro Woss y Gil, she was 12 years old when her family left the country in exile after her father's second presidential term ended in 1903. She spent the rest of her early years living and studying art in Paris, Cuba, and New York City.

Her style fuses post-impressionist influences from Europe with a distinctly Caribbean flavor. She is known for her nudes of women and scenes of bustling marketplaces. In 1924, she put on a solo exhibition of her work, being the first woman to do so in the country.

Woss y Gil is especially remembered as an influential educator who would go on to teach some of the most well known native artists of the 20th century. She opened an art school in Santo Domingo in 1924, and later a painting and drawing academy in 1931. In August 1942, Woss y Gil joined the newly established National School of Fine Arts as founding faculty along with artists Josep Gausachs, George Hausdorf, José Vela Zanetti, and Manolo Pascual, later becoming the director. Among her students were artists Gilberto Hernández Ortega and Delia Weber.

Woss y Gil died in 1985, aged 94–95, in Santo Domingo.

== Early life and education ==
Woss y Gil was born on May 5, 1891, in Santo Domingo to María Altagracia Ricart Pérez and two-time former president Alejandro Woss y Gil (1885-1887 and 1903). Alejandro Woss y Gil served briefly as president in 1903; because he was removed from office after only a few short months, the Woss y Gil family left for France in exile, living there until 1912 before moving to Cuba.

Her initial art studies began under the guidance of Abelardo Rodríguez Urdaneta in Santo Domingo. Living in Cuba, Woss y Gil enrolled at the Painting Academy in Santiago de Cuba, under the instruction of José Joaquín Tejada. Here, she participated in her first exhibition.

From 1920 to 1922 she lived in New York City and continue her studies, enrolling at the Art Students League of New York and the National Academy of Design, during which she studied with Ashcan realist artist George Luks and impressionist Frank DuMond. Her work was first exhibited in the United States in 1923 in an Art Students League exhibition.

== Artistic career ==
In 1924, Woss y Gil returned to Santo Domingo and opened a studio-school, teaching classes in the courtyard of her home. To inaugurate the school, she held a solo exhibition, being the first female artist in Dominican Republic to do so, which was well received by art critics throughout the country. Her school introduced the practice of drawing from live models in the country.

Woss y Gill's post-impressionistic art style shows depictions of a wide range of subjects, most popularly female nudes, portraits, and scenes of Dominican pictorial life.

Interested in human anatomy, Woss y Gil closed her home studio-school in 1928 to leave for New York to further her artistic training. Upon her return to Santo Domingo in 1931, she establishes an Academy of Drawing and Painting, which would become the foremost art school in the country throughout the 1930s. Among the students she taught here were Gilberto Hernández Ortega, Delia Weber, Genoveva Báez, Xavier Amiama, and Purita Barón.

Woss y Gil taught at her academy for the next 10 years until in 1942, when she joined the founding faculty of the newly formed National School of Fine Arts (“Escuela Nacional de Bellas Artes”), eventually becoming director of the school.

== Social Activism ==
Woss y Gil played an important role in the woman's suffrage movement in the Dominican Republic that won women the right to vote during the Rafael Trujillo dictatorship. In 1927, she along with Abigaíl Mejía, Delia Weber, Trina de Moya, Ana Josefa Puello, and other artists and educators founded Nosotras Club, the first feminist organization in the country, which advocated for woman's liberation and the betterment of children. Years later, in 1931, Acción Feminista Dominicana (AFD) was established, with the purpose of the “intellectual, social, moral, and juridical development of women”. The organization pursued Dominican women's right to vote, and launched a feminist manifesto in 1931, claiming the right to gender equality in the country's Constitution. Women were officially granted the right to vote in 1942.

== Notable works ==
In 1939, Woss and Gil's "El Vendedor de Andullos" was exhibited in the World Painting Exhibition at the New York World's Fair, obtaining a Medal of Honor for her painting; this painting depicts two men smoking andullo, a form of dried, compressed, fermented, and rolled tobacco for pipe smoking and chewing widely used in Dominican Republic since pre-Columbian times. The background of the image displays working people going about their everyday lives, as well as children playing beneath a Arecaceae palm tree and a blue sky. The painting travelled around the United States well into the 1940s.

== Gallery ==
Nude, 1941 (Museo de Arte Moderno, Santo Domingo)

Woss y Gil. Portrait of President Alejandro Woss y Gil
