= Dominican art =

Cultural output of the Dominican Republic

Dominican art comprises all the visual arts and plastic arts made in Dominican Republic. Since ancient times, various groups have inhabited the island of Ayíti/Quisqueya (the Indigenous names of the island), or Hispaniola (the name the Spanish gave to the island); the history of the country's art is generally compartmentalized into three periods: pre-Hispanic or Aboriginal Amerindian (500 BC to 1500 AD), Hispanic or colonial (1502 to 1821 AD), and the national or Dominican period (1844 to present day).

Archeological evidence for human populations on the island go back 6,000 years, when Archaic Age foragers arrived from South America to the Caribbean island. Going back to the origins of autochthonous art, corresponding to the stage known as prehistoric, primitive or pre-Hispanic, we find several ethnic groups that made up the Aboriginal culture: Taínos, Igneris, Ciboneyes, Kalinago and Guanahatabeyes. Out of all of them, Taíno art was the majority and most widespread throughout the insular territory, leaving behind an abundance of pottery and ceramic structures.

The Indigenous era of the island came to end after Spanish invasion and colonization, beginning when Christopher Columbus arrived on the coasts of the island in 1492, leading to their decimation from enslavement, genocide, and foreign diseases. The newly "discovered" island was given the name "La Española" (Hispaniola) and became the first permanent European colony established in the Americas, Santo Domingo, in 1498. In this early period, most artworks were produced in Spain for shipment to Santo Domingo. Much of this early art no longer survive, considering many owners emigrated with their art, countless storms destroyed towns and their works, and Francis Drake's sacking of Santo Domingo in 1586 led to the disappearance of a lot of early colonial art.

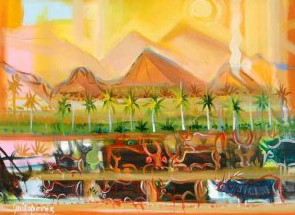
Metamorfosis, Guillo Perez 1965

The painting movement in Dominican society is young, considering it begins to sow its first fruits during the Independence of 1844. Since then, it has manifested in diverse forms and styles produced by the blend of Indigenous, European, and West African elements found in the culture. The most prominent styles throughout the country's history have been Romanticism, Costumbrismo, Impressionism, Neoclassicism, Naturalism, Expressionism, Surrealism, and Abstract art. Some the most well known Dominican artists are Jaime Colson, Yoryi Morel, Dario Suro, Celeste Woss y Gil, and Guillo Perez.

== Aboriginal Indigenous art ==
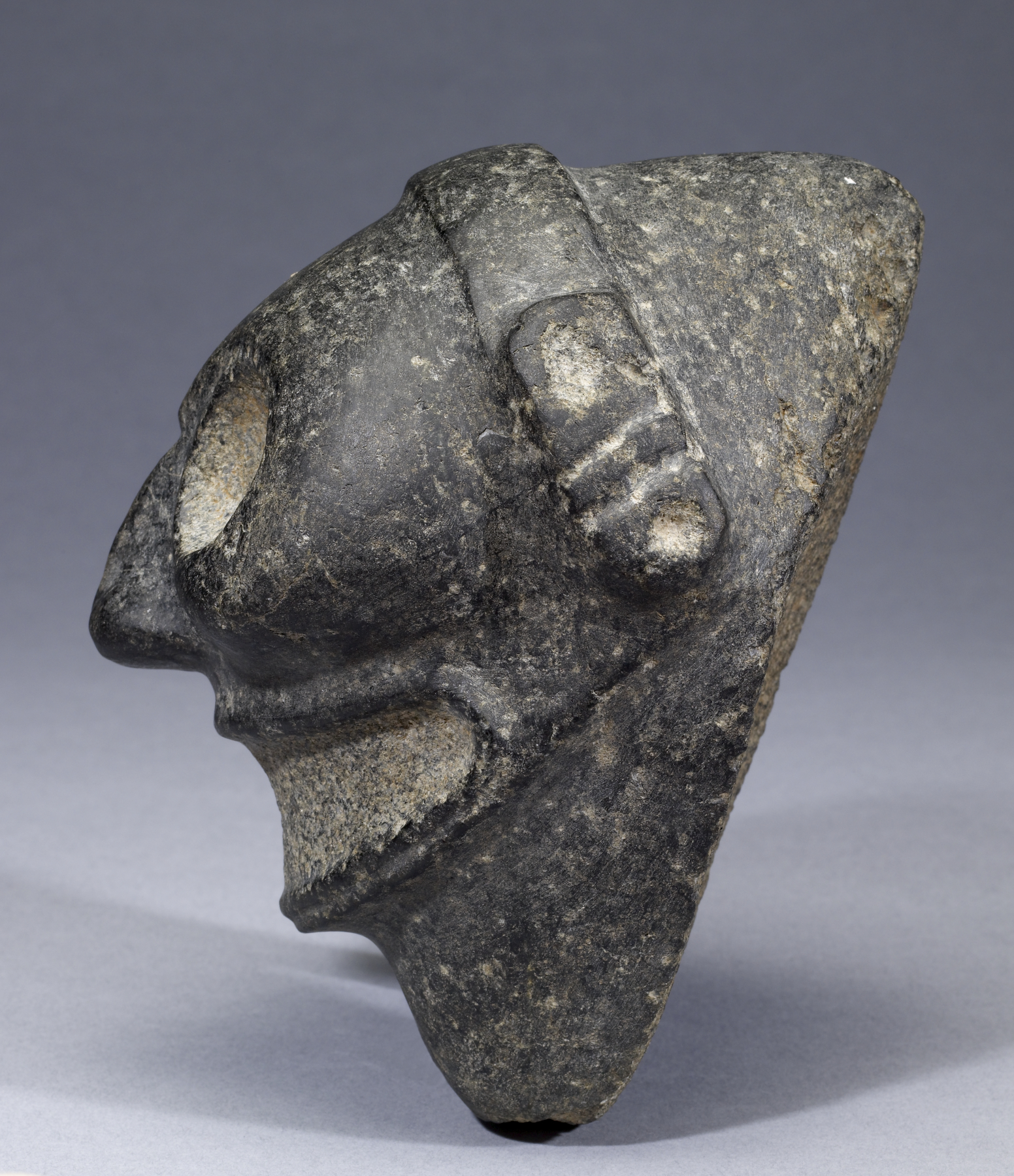
Taino Zemi – Left Side, circa 800 AD and 1500 AD

For millennia, the predominant inhabitants of Ayíti/Quisqueya were Arawak and Taíno peoples. They were Arawakan-speaking peoples, whose ancestors settled some 2,500 years before Columbus, having migrated from South America and replacing an earlier Archaic age people that had been wiped out. The Taínos formed an agricultural society with myriad artistic expression, including music, dance, body art, poetic myths, and an abundant production of ceramics, pottery, and sculptures in the Chicoid style, distinguished by its expressive symbolic decoration with sculptural features of stylized anthropomorphic and zoomorphic representations.

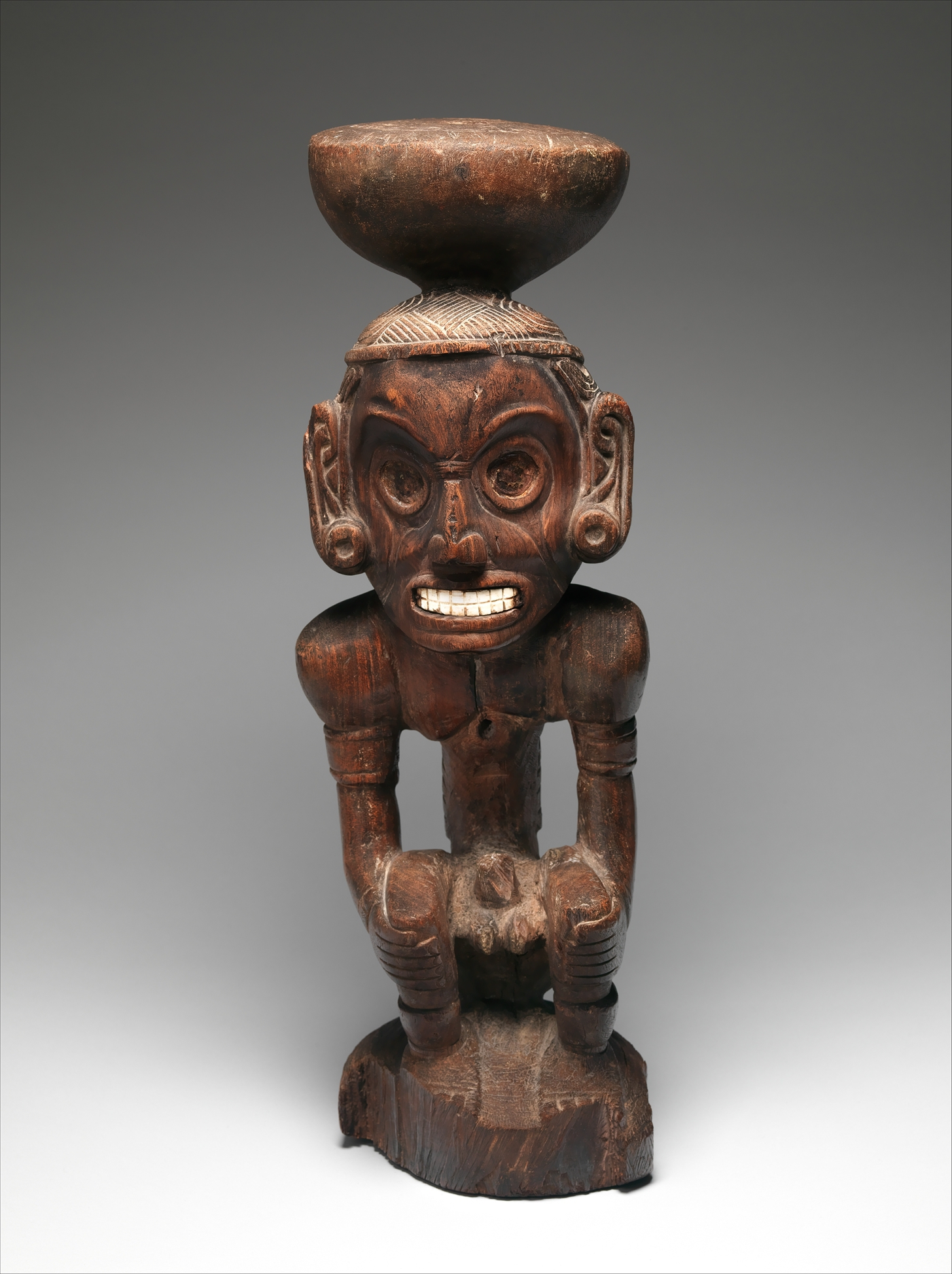
Zemí Cohoba stand, Taíno artist c. 1000 C.E.

Taino art tends to be highly religious, loaded with animism. Along with rich ceramic and pottery art, rock engravings, called petroglyphs, and rock paintings, called pictographs, are abundant throughout the country's caves and caverns, dating back to approximately 2,000 years ago, although Taíno cave art is difficult to differentiate from those of earlier cultures; the Aboriginal rock art is not the work of a single settlement group, but rather the work of different groups throughout different moments of the island's history. According to Taíno creation myths, the first humans, with the sun and the moon, emerged from caves in a sacred mountain on the island. Caves were revered as holy places, and believed to be our world's connection to the underworld and where the dead would passage.

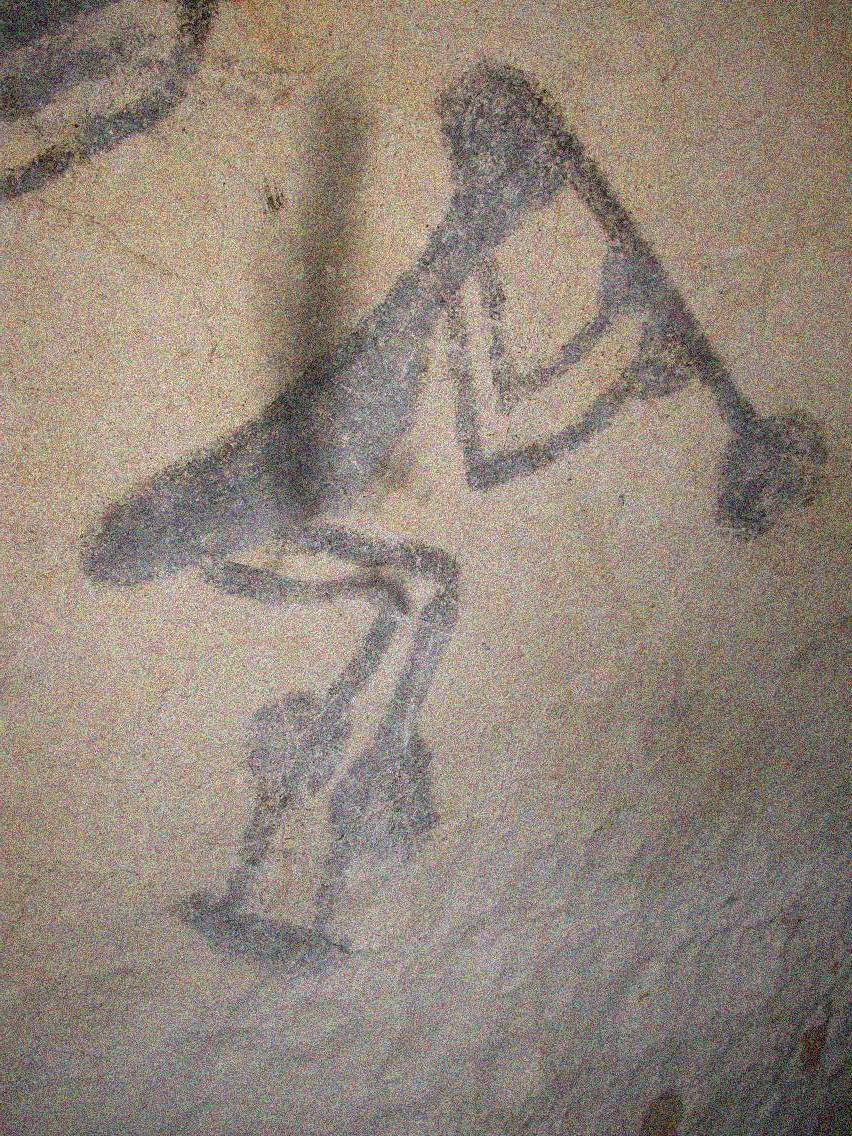
Pictograph of cohoba consumption found in Pomier caves. 2000 years old.

Of all the Antillean islands, Ayíti/Quisqueya appears to be the territory most abundant in petroglyphs. Moreover, the geographic distribution of the sites where rock/cave paintings are located correspond with the locations of historically intensive populations. Overall, two artistic languages are employed: that of a realistic, naturalistic approach, or an abstract approach by way of symbols, schemes, and stylizations. Motifs or designs of these rock art are classified into several groups:

Anthropomorphic: drawings of human figures.

Zoomorphs: animal representations.

Anthropozoomorphs: figuration that combines humans and animals.

Phytomorphs: figures of plants, flowers, fruits, etc.

Mytomorphs: representations of myths, legend, others.

Asteromorphs: figures of celestial stars

By the mid-16th century, Spanish colonization had brought a brutal end to the Taíno civilization, having wiped out between 80 and 90% of the indigenous population through genocide and foreign-brought diseases. Warfare, the encomienda system, and no resistance to Old World epidemic outbreaks, like smallpox, influenza, measles, and typhus decimated the Taíno population on the island. Survivors had no choice but to assimilate into the Spanish colony, with many Dominicans today carrying native DNA. Over time, the mestizo children of the Spanish colonizers and Taíno concubines intermarried with West Africans after their arrival from the Trans-Atlantic slave trade, creating the tri-racial Creole culture found in the country today.

=== Gallery ===
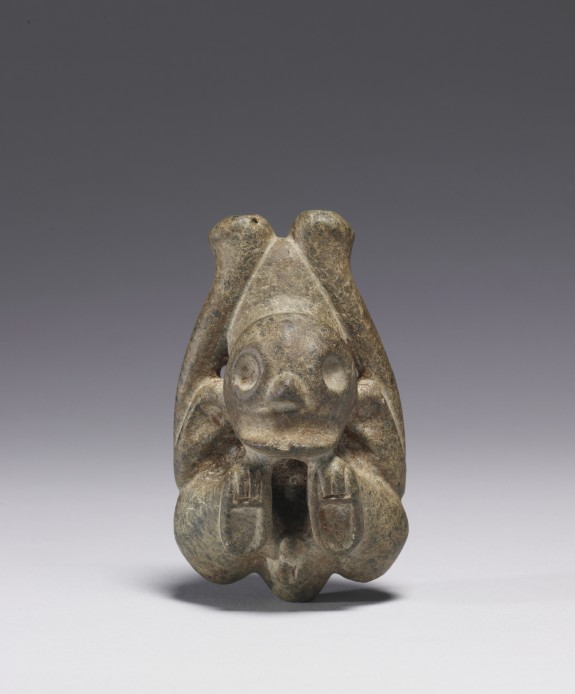
Cohoba inhaler in the form of a shaman

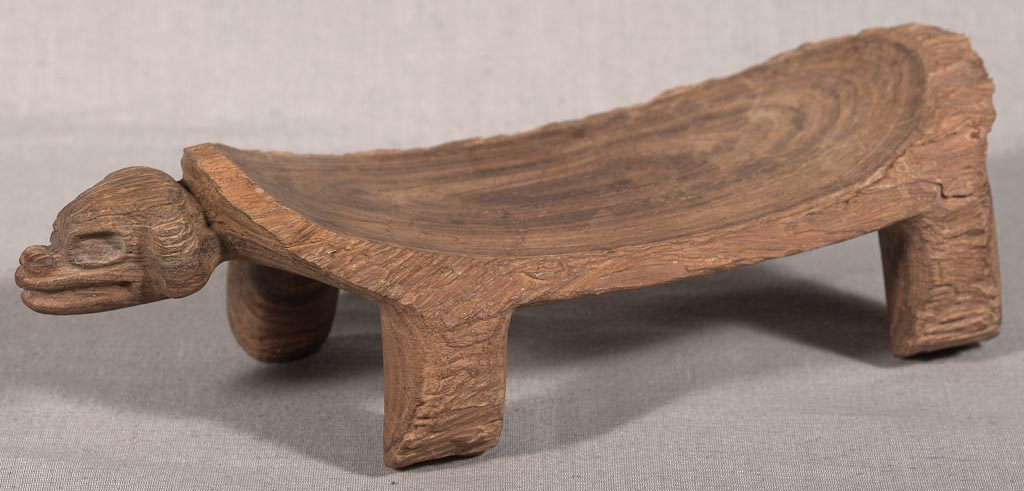
Duho (Ceremonial wooden stool), Hispaniola. Taíno, 1000–1500 CE, carved lignum vitae

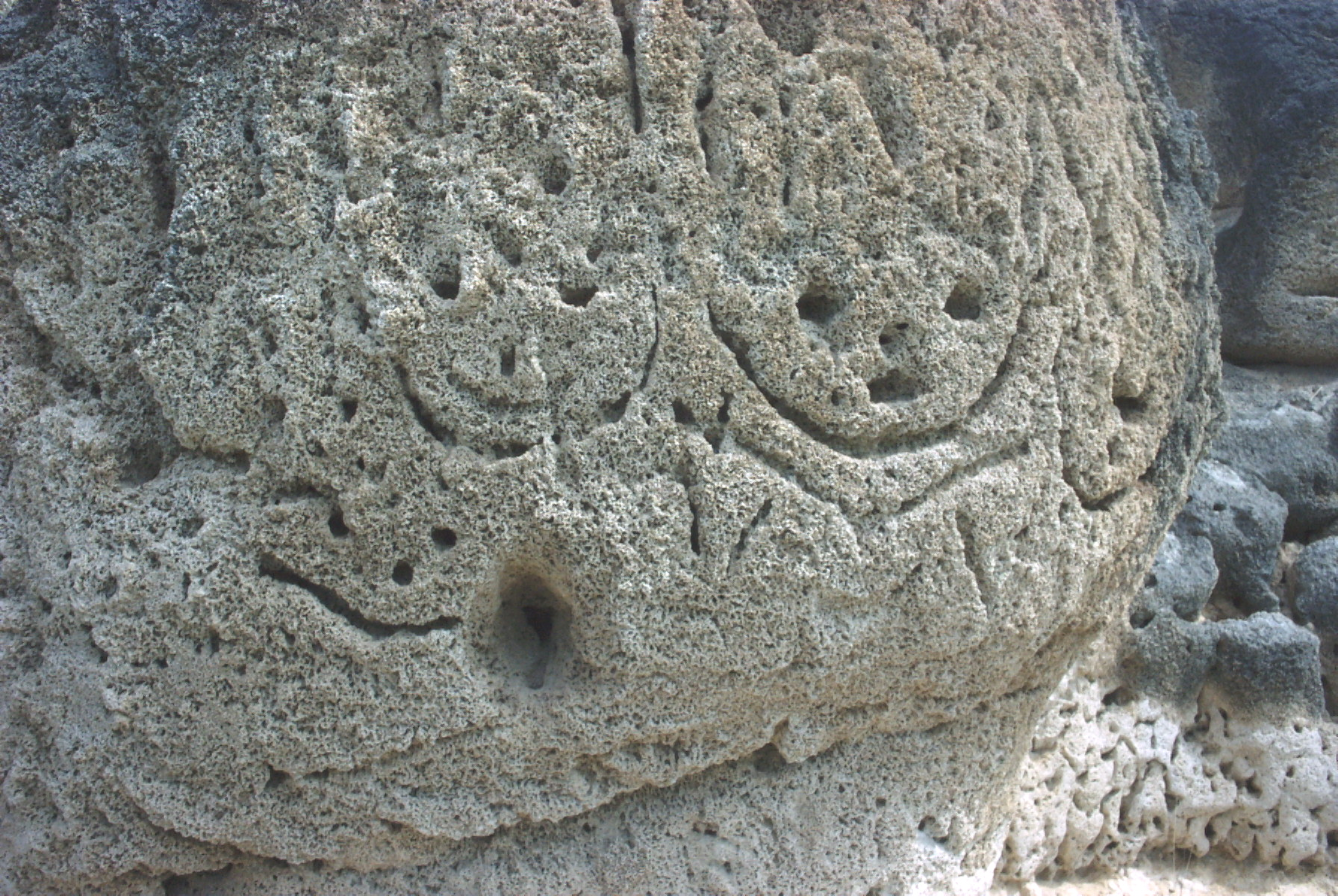
Las Caritas, Taíno petroglyphs, Lake Enriquillo, Dominican Republic

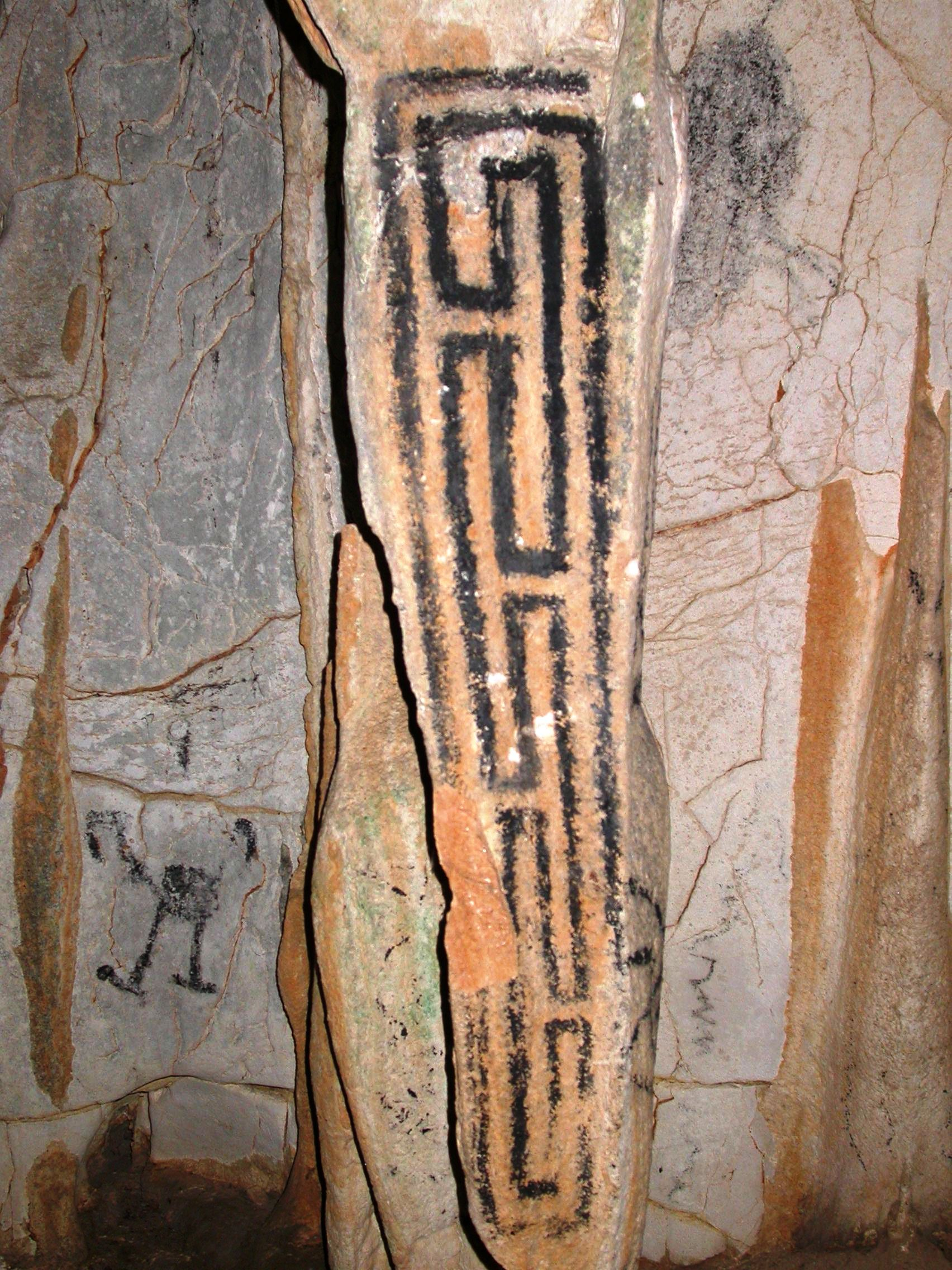
Pictografia igneri

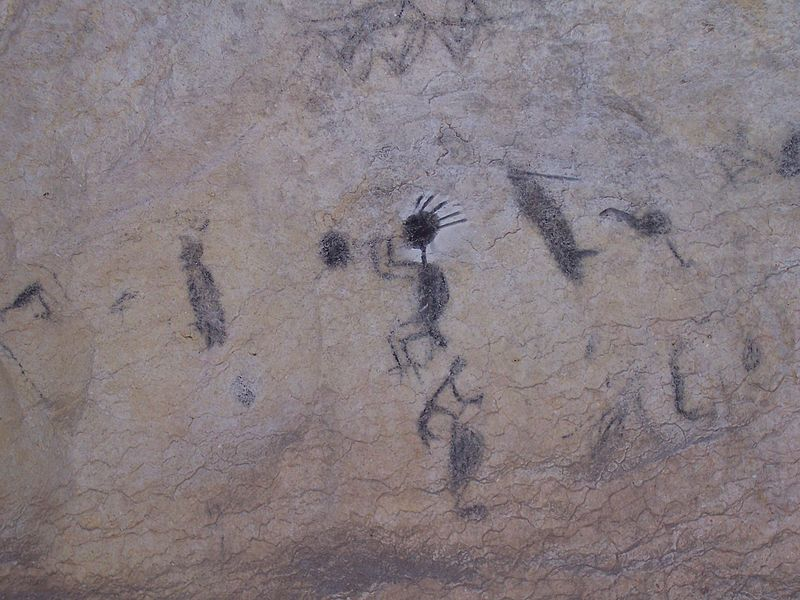
Cueva El Pomier

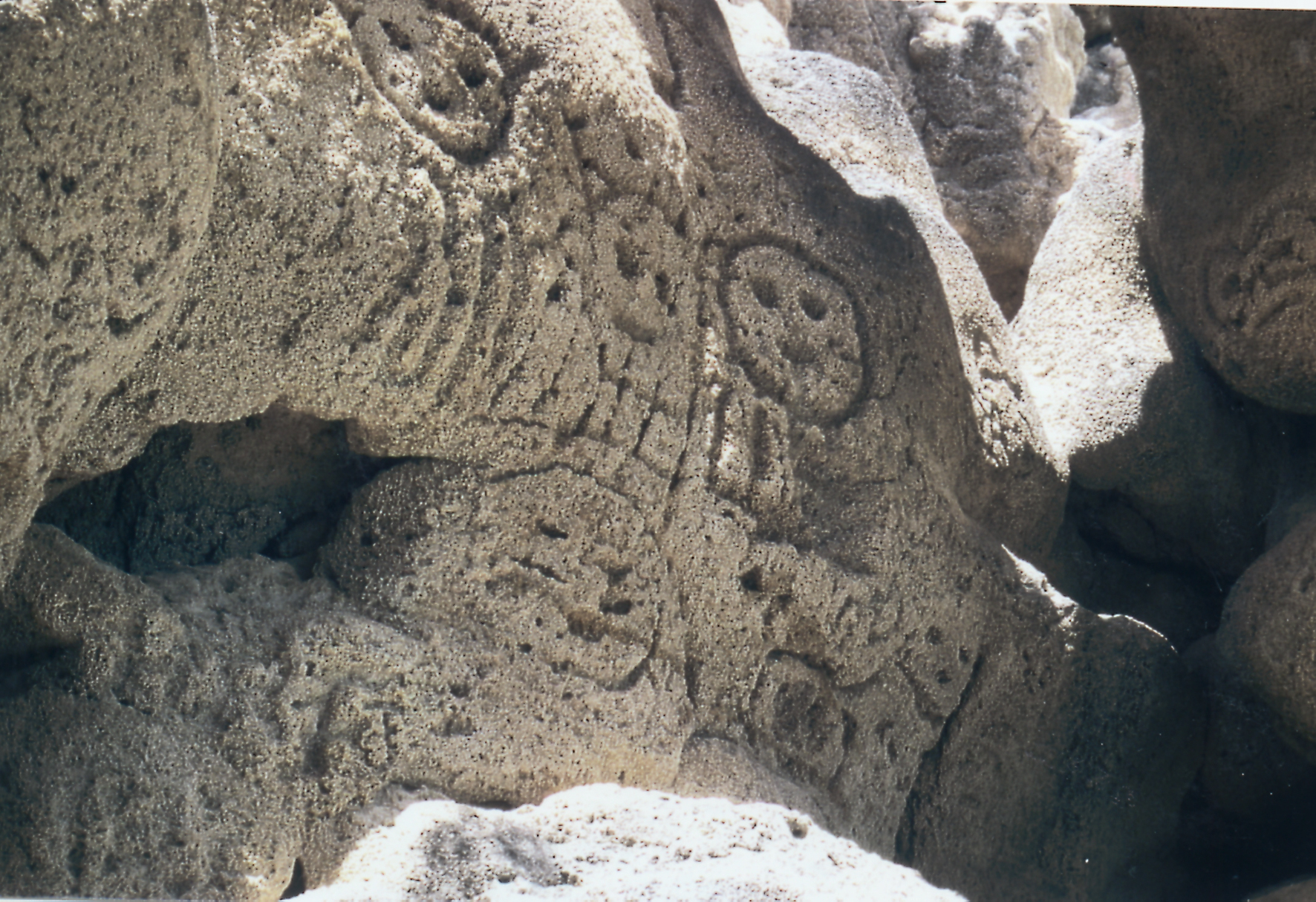
Caritas Enriquillo

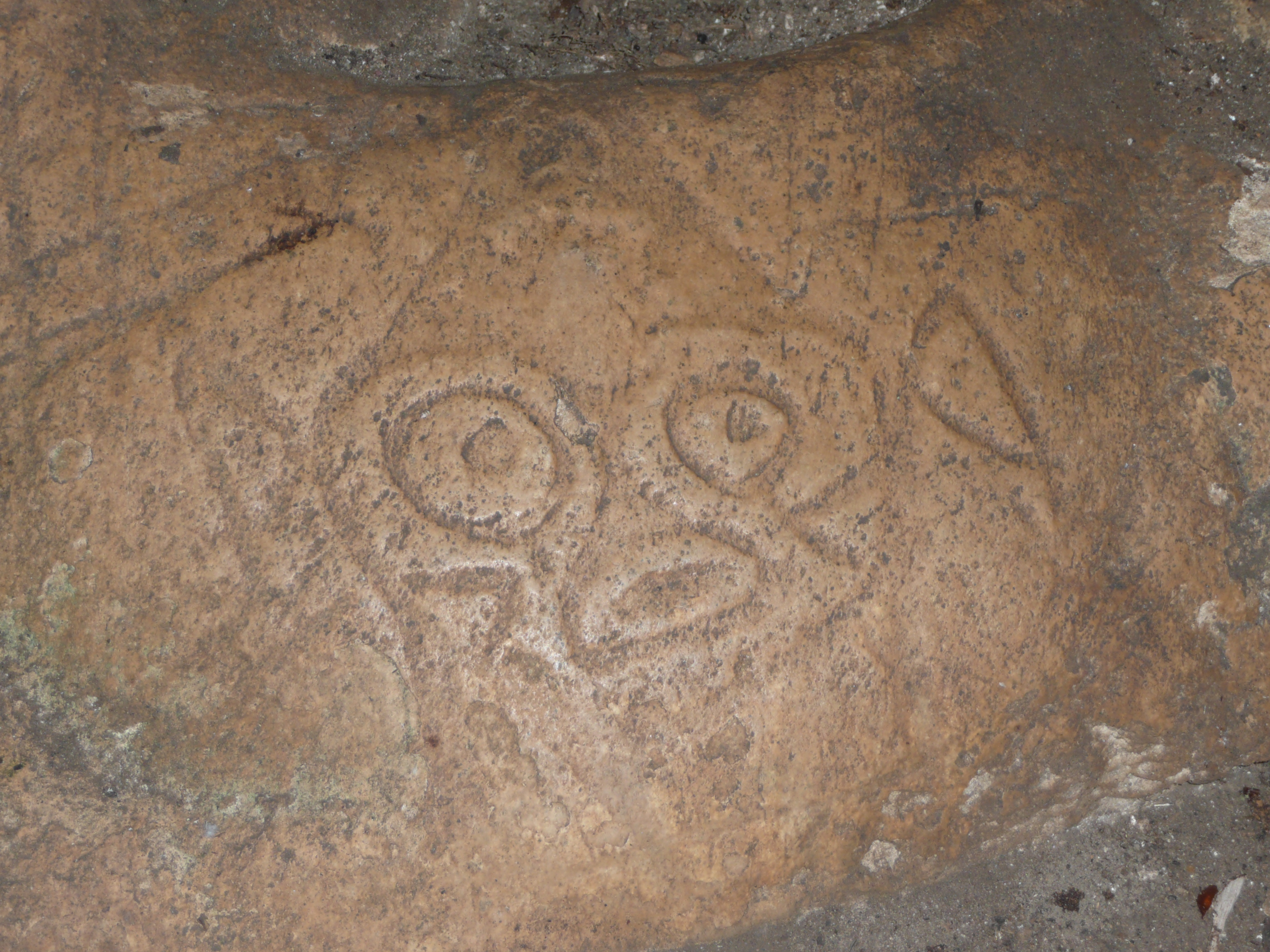
Taíno petroglyph in Los Haitises 01 by Line1

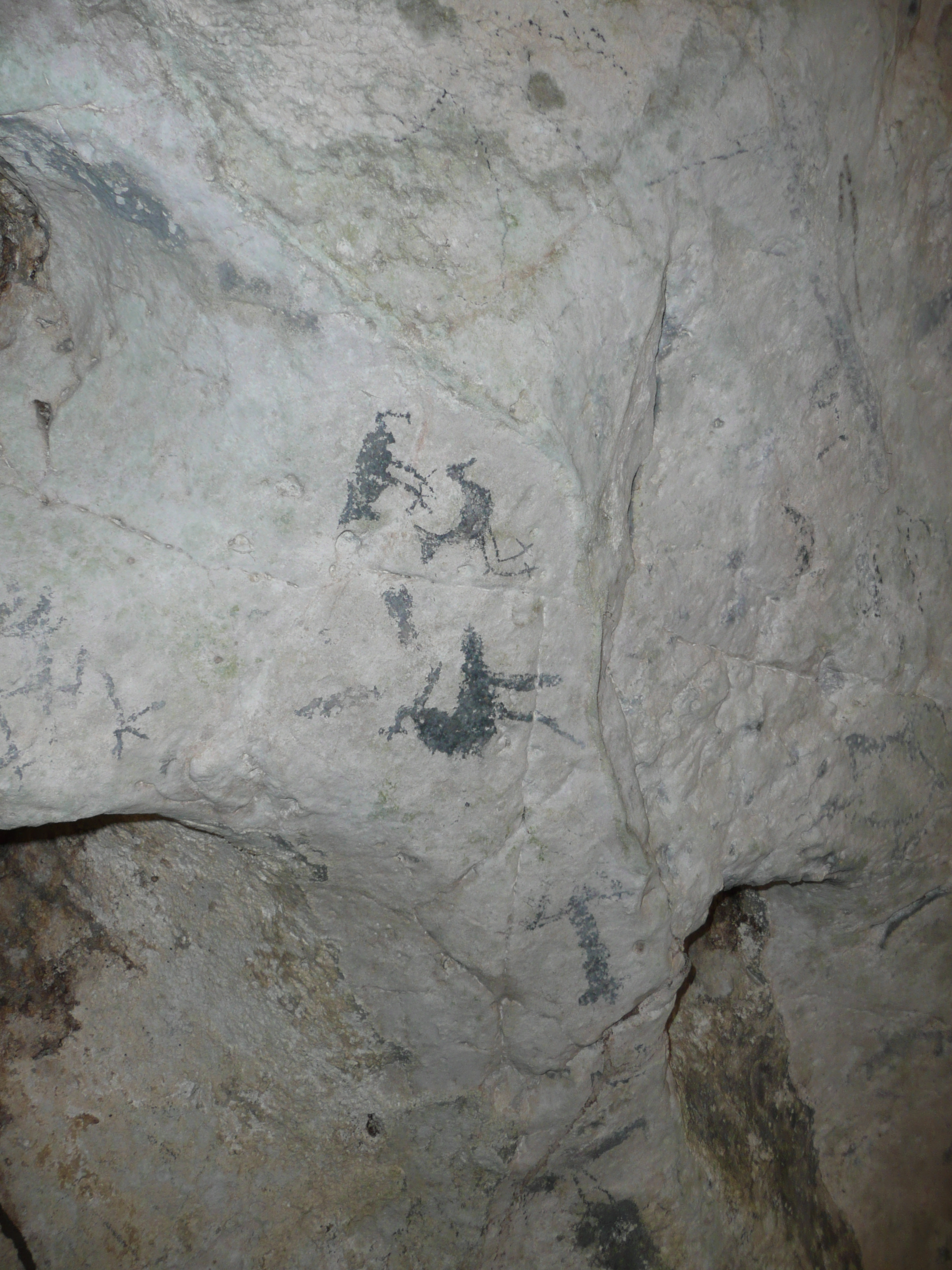
Taíno petroglyph in Los Haitises 02 by Line1

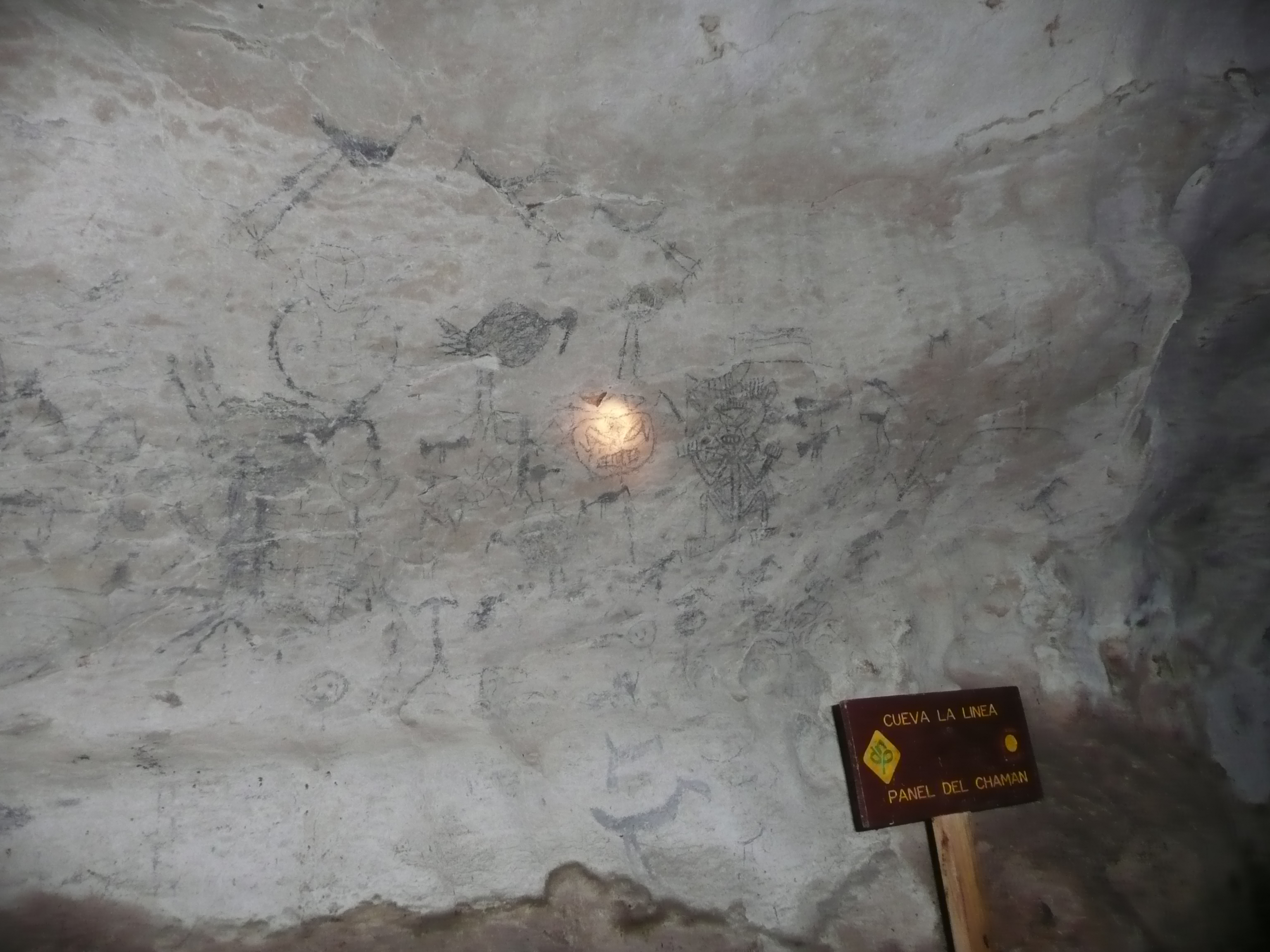
Taíno petroglyph in Los Haitises 12 by Line1

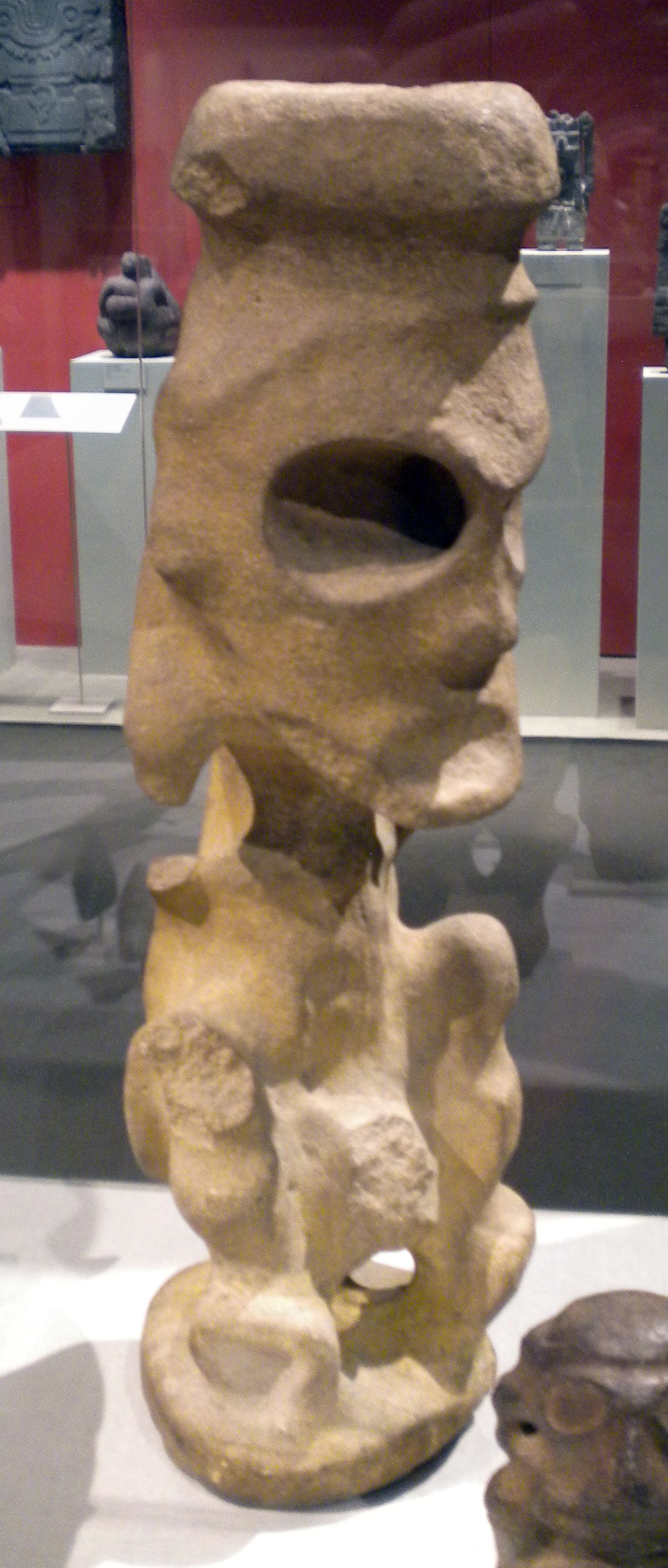
Zemi figure 1

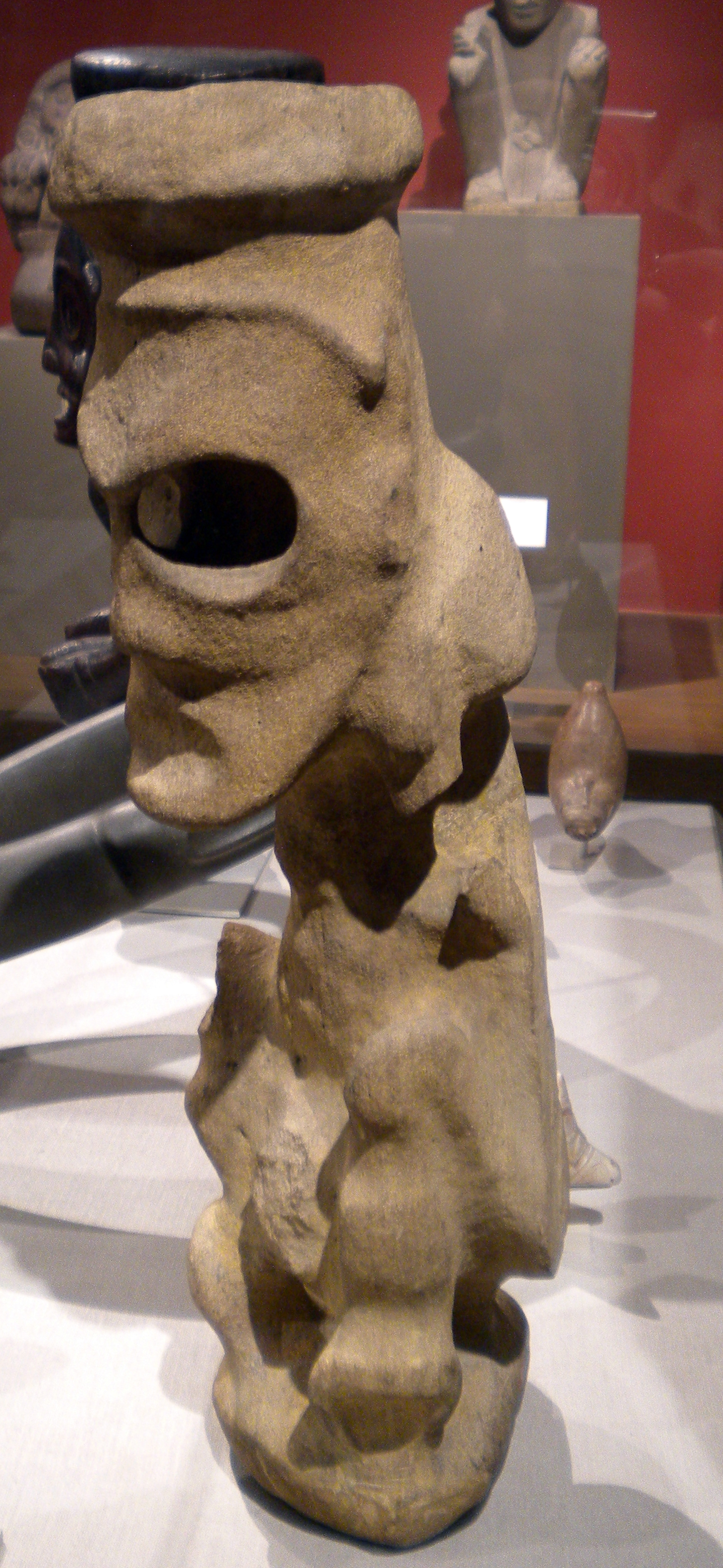
Zemi figure 2

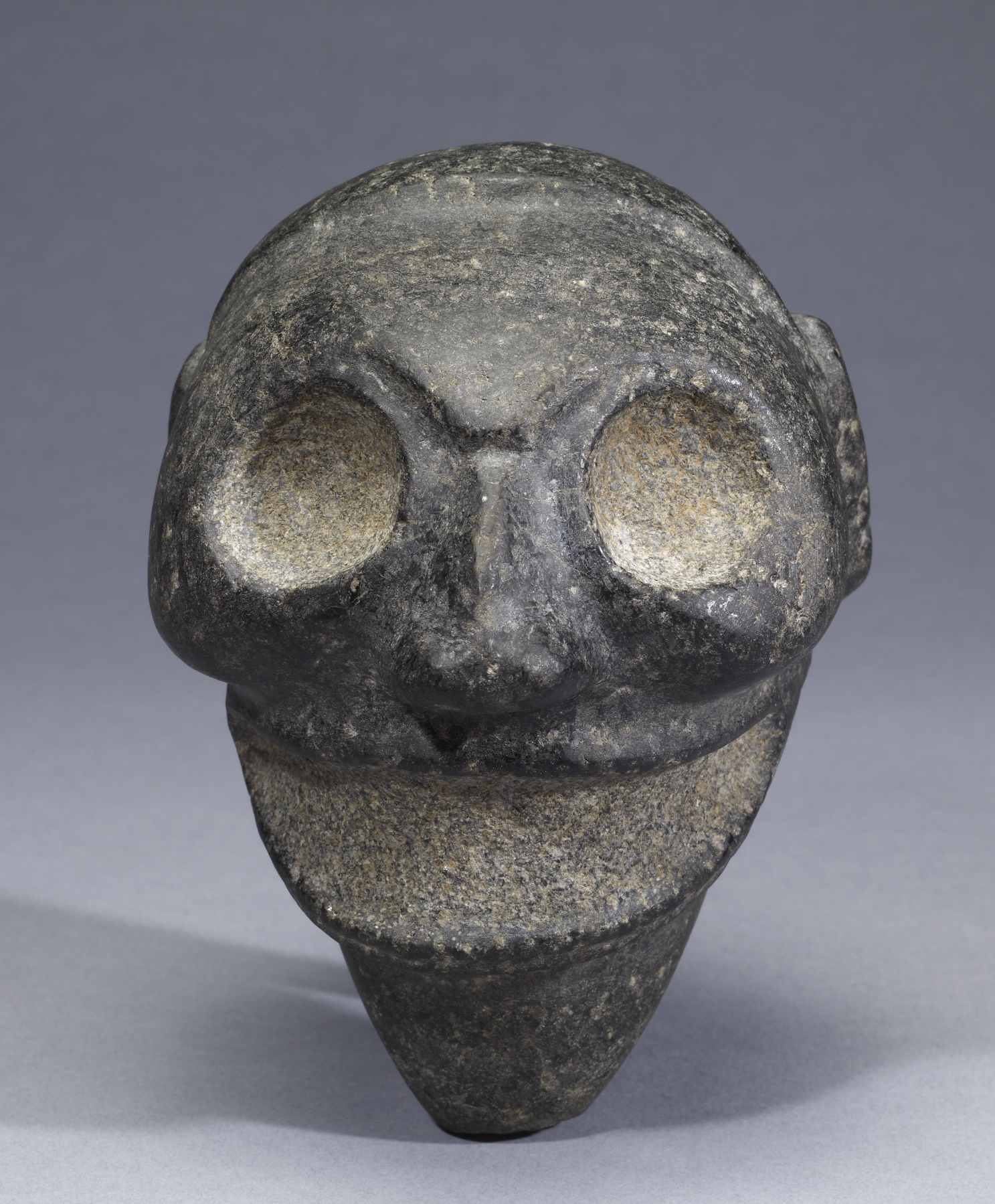
Taino – Zemi – Walters 20056

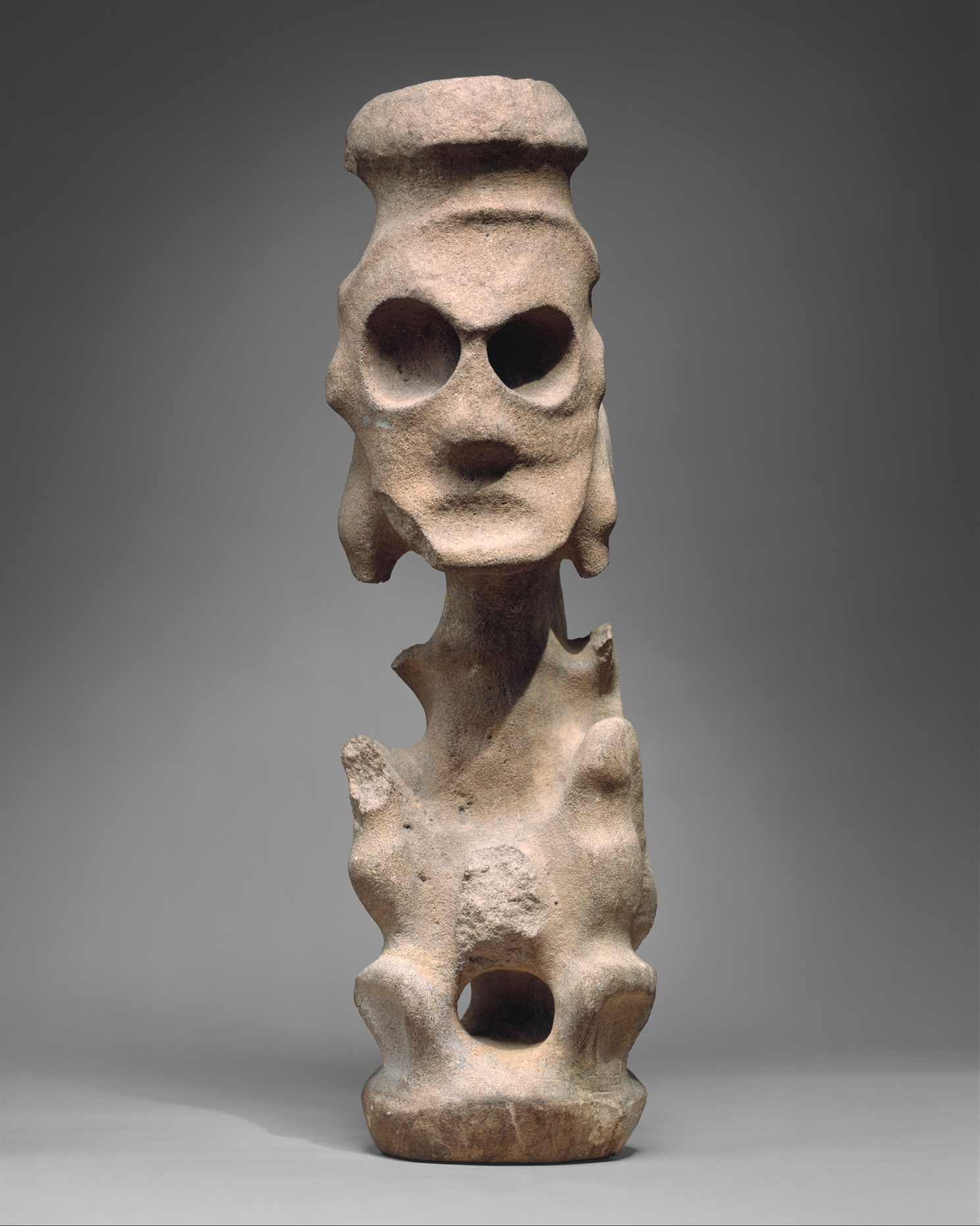
Deity Figure (Zemí) MET DT5114

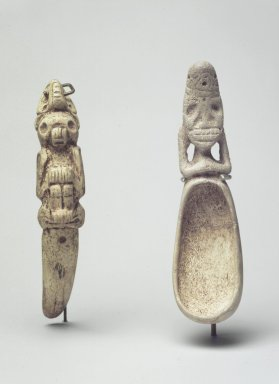
Taino Cohoba Spoon. 1200–1500 AD

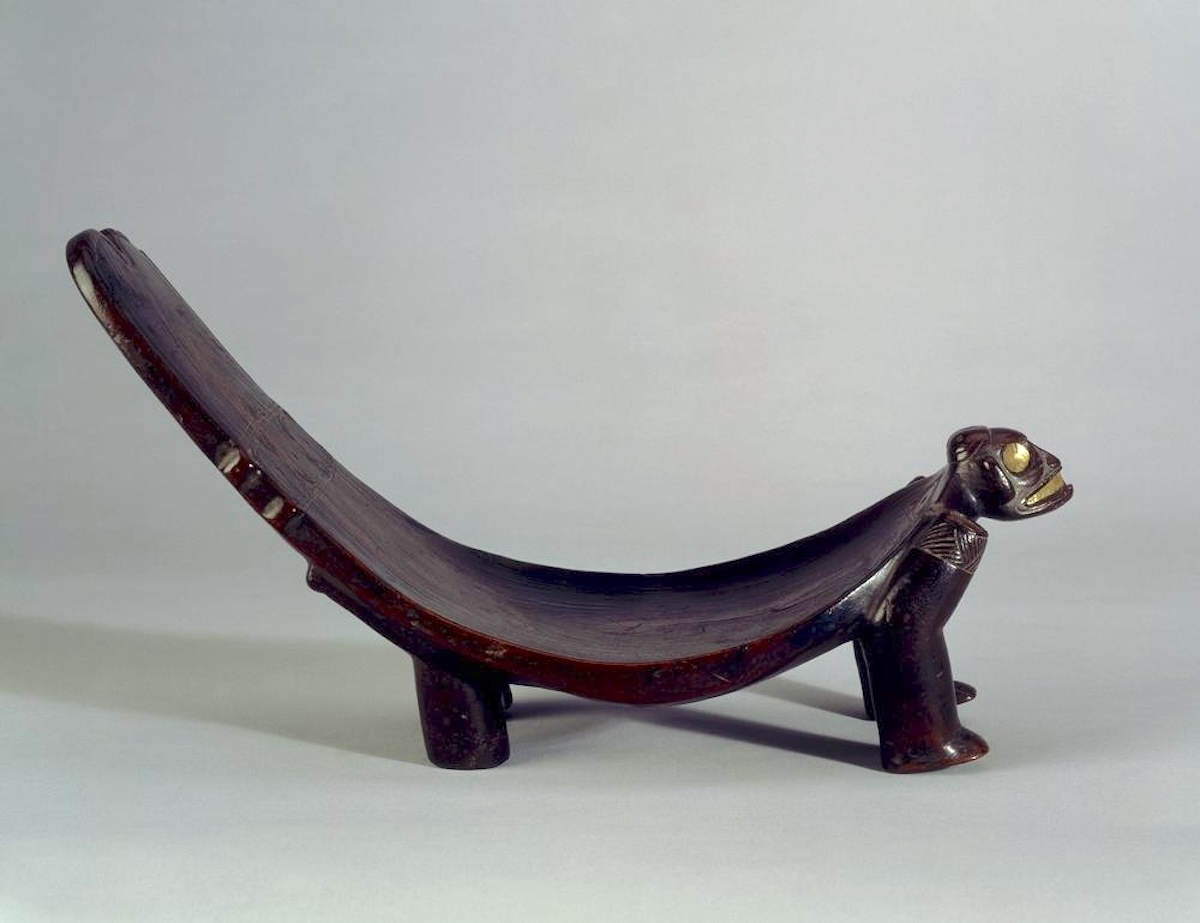
Found in a cave in Santo Domingo" called Duho; Arawak craftsmanship, 1292–1399 AD

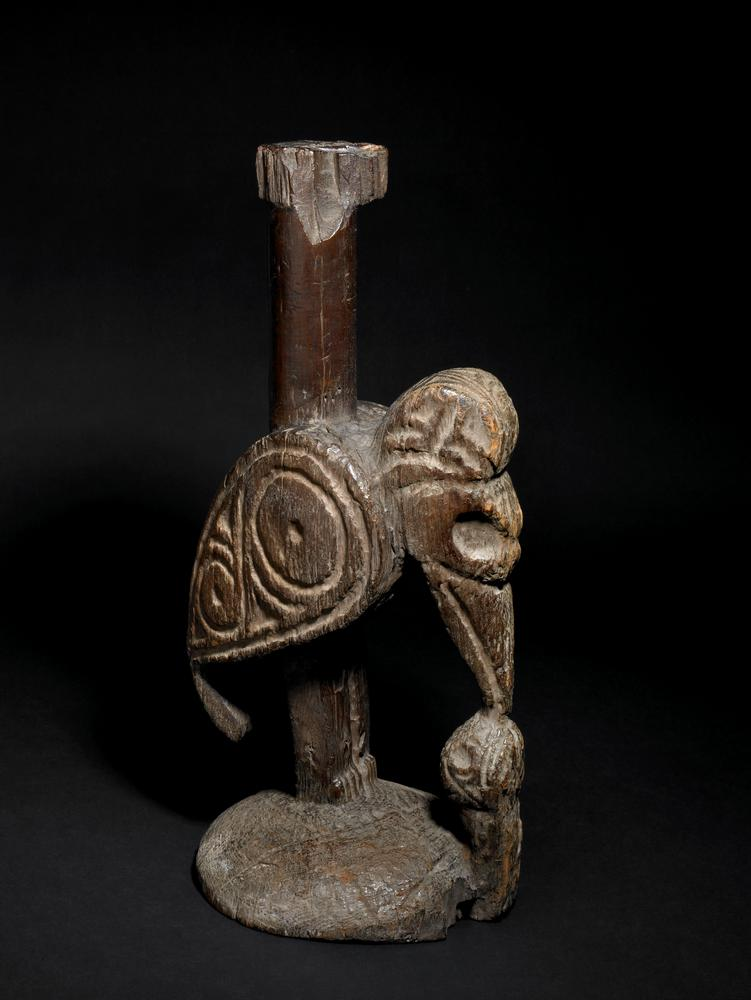
Bird figure (standing on snake ?, or tortoise ?) made of wood. Dated to 1186–1273 AD

== Art during the colonial era (1492–1821) ==
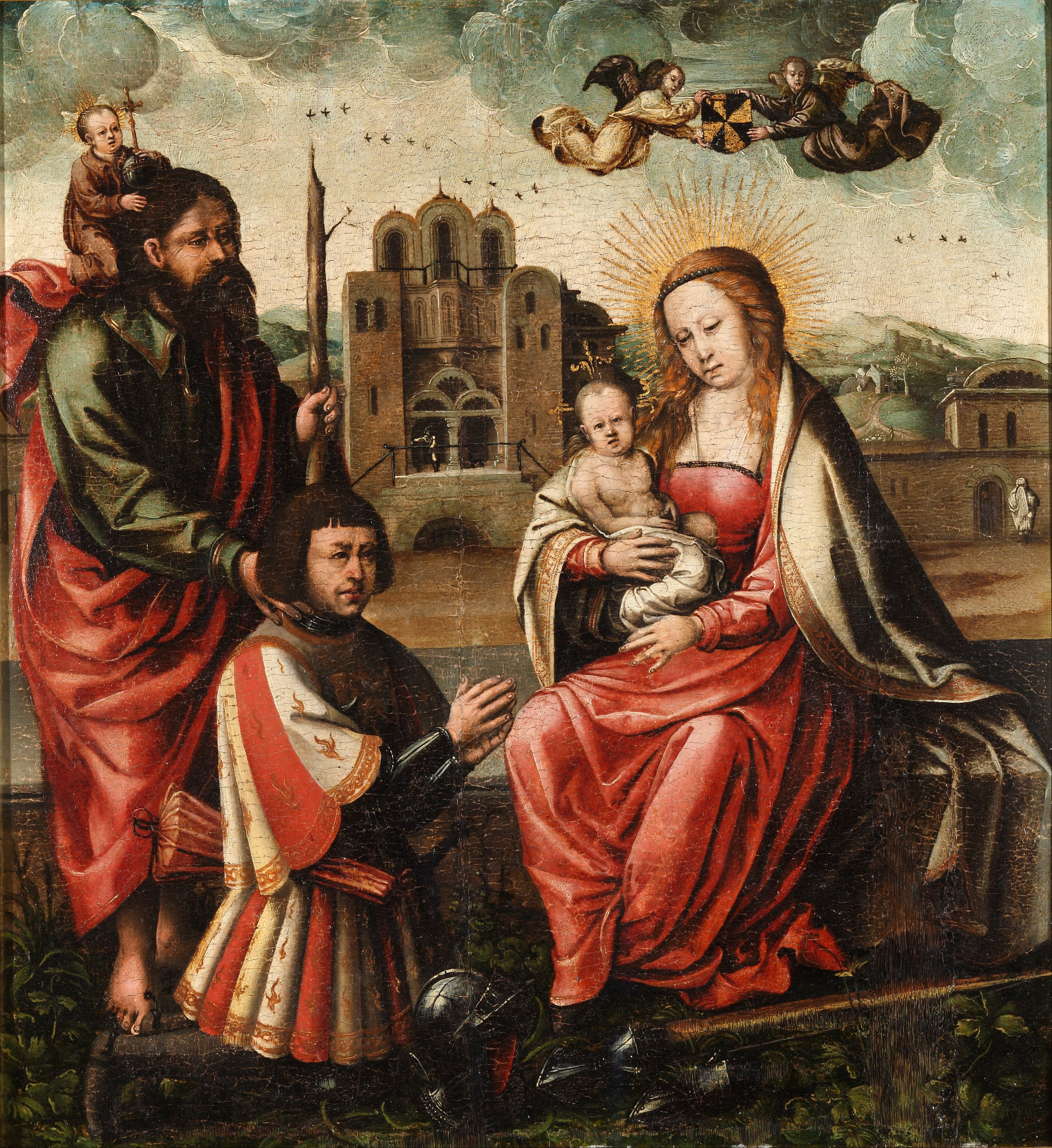
The Virgin of Cristóbal Colón, Unknown 1540

Soon after Christopher Columbus first arrived at the island, a divergent art style was introduced in Santo Domingo, the first seat of European artistic influence in the "New World". During the colonial period, art was characterized by religious-themed pictorial productions of Catholic icons, although mostly imported from Spain. Moreover, it was sacred and essentially anonymous, being that the first artists and craftsmen were brought to the island for the ornamentation of the first churches. According to the Marquis of Lozoya, there were three capital works during the 16th century in the colony; these include a mural painting representing a martyred saint held in the Treasury Room of the Catedral Primada; the magnificent copy of the Virgen de la Antigua, found in a chapel in the same Cathedral; and La Virgen de Cristóbal Colón, believed to be the oldest preserved portrait of Columbus; though painted in Santo Domingo, it remains in display in Lázaro Galdiano Museum.

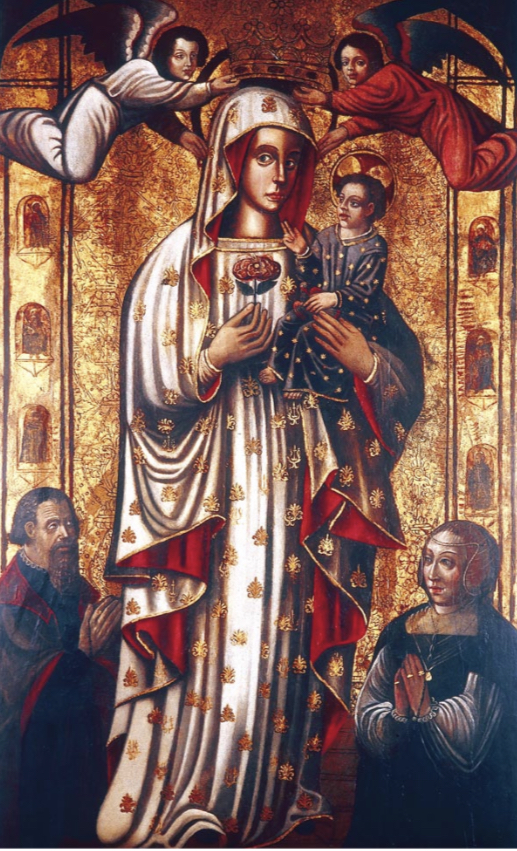
Virgen Nuestra Señora de la Antigua, 16th century

Of the three works mentioned, the most important is the Virgin de la Antigua, painted in Seville between 1520 and 1523. It was saved from a shipwreck in the vicinity of the Virgin Islands when it was brought by ship to Santo Domingo and considered the first large-format painting to arrive to the Americas, measuring at 2.85 meters in height by 1.75 wide.

Another imported though significant painting during the colonial period is Nuestra Señora de la Altragracia, held in the Basílica Catedral de Higüey. Considered the oldest preserved painting of the colony, it was brought to the island by two brothers, Alonso and Antonio de Trejo, from their home in Placencia, in the region of Extremadura in 1502. During this time, the sacred image of the Virgin Mary took on a special role in the colony and became represented by this painting. According to traditional legend, the Virgin de la Altagracia appeared beneath an orange tree in the town of Higüey, inspiring invocations and turning her into a national icon of the island. Since the early 1500s to the present day, Nuestra Señora de la Altragracia has been viewed as the maximum expression of the Marian cult for all Dominicans of Catholic faith.

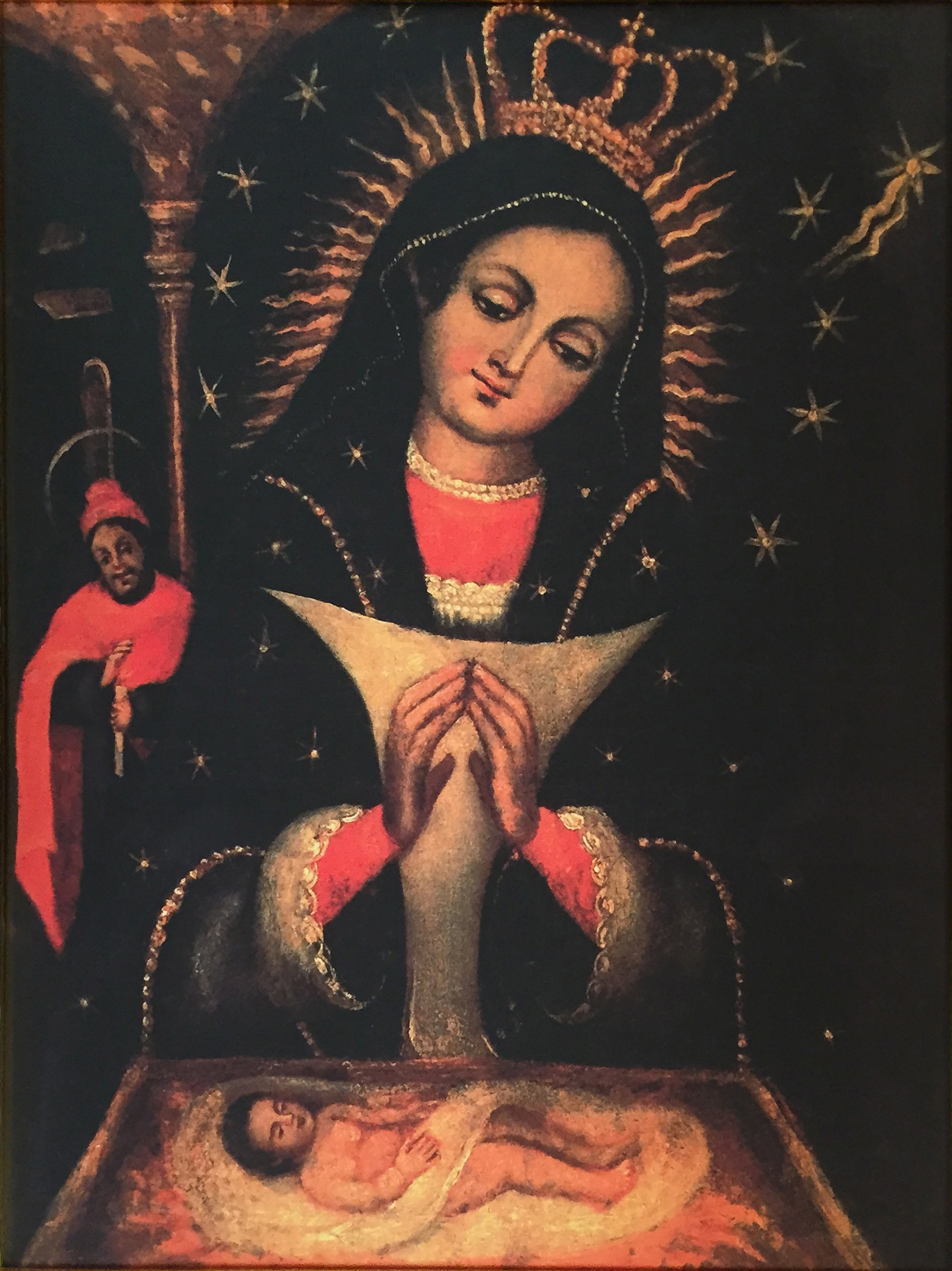
Nuestra Señora de la Altagracia, 16th century, Tesoro Basílica de Higüey

Overall, the Hispanic, Catholic and stately aesthetic, including a medieval-renaissance eclecticism, reflects the art of the period, and is above all expressed in the civil and religious architecture of Santo Domingo during this time. The first century of Spanish colonialism didn't produce any mestizo art, considering Spanish exploitation was too severe. Moreover, during the 17th century, Hispaniola faced a period of isolation and general poverty, in which a creole mentality was beginning to be defined in the majority mixed population, in isolation, and in religious cults, like the Altagraciano, associated with offerings, miracles, veneration and the iconographic multiplicity of the maternal image.

The anonymity of early colonial painters is explained by the fact that the majority did not sign their works. No knowledge of other painters survive like artists Francisco Velásquez, painter of the Twelve Apostles displayed in the Cathedral Primada, and Diego José Hilaris, whose series of paintings cover miracles of the Virgin Mary that took place throughout the colony. Despite no specificities concerning their biography survive, we know they were criollos born on the island during the mid-1700s. Hilaris, painted his series, known as medallions for their shape, in the latter half of the 1700s; of the 27 whose existence is known, 10 have been lost. In the case of Velásquez, it is said that he was born in Santo Domingo in the last half of the 18th century and died between 1822 and 1830. With respect to Hilaris, it is believed that he was born in Higüey, between 1760 and 1778 with no estimated year of death.

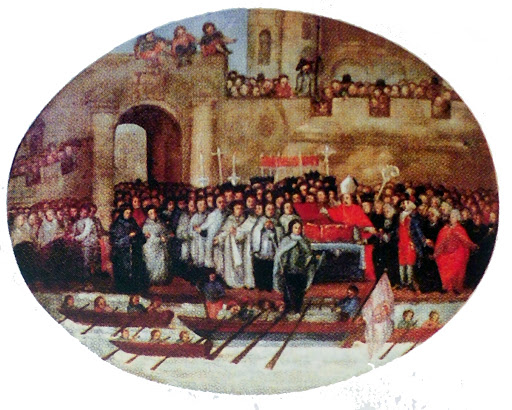
Medallón de los señores del cabildo de Santo Domingo. Diego José Hilaris, 1760–1790

Fundamentally, the artistic relevance of the colonial era lies in architecture, as Darío Suro points out. Construction needs generated by the founding of the new city resulted in a broad urban development that is exemplified in the Cathedral of Santo Domingo, the Fortaleza Ozama, the palace house of Diego Colón, and the old convent of Las Mercedes in Santo Domingo.

=== Gallery ===
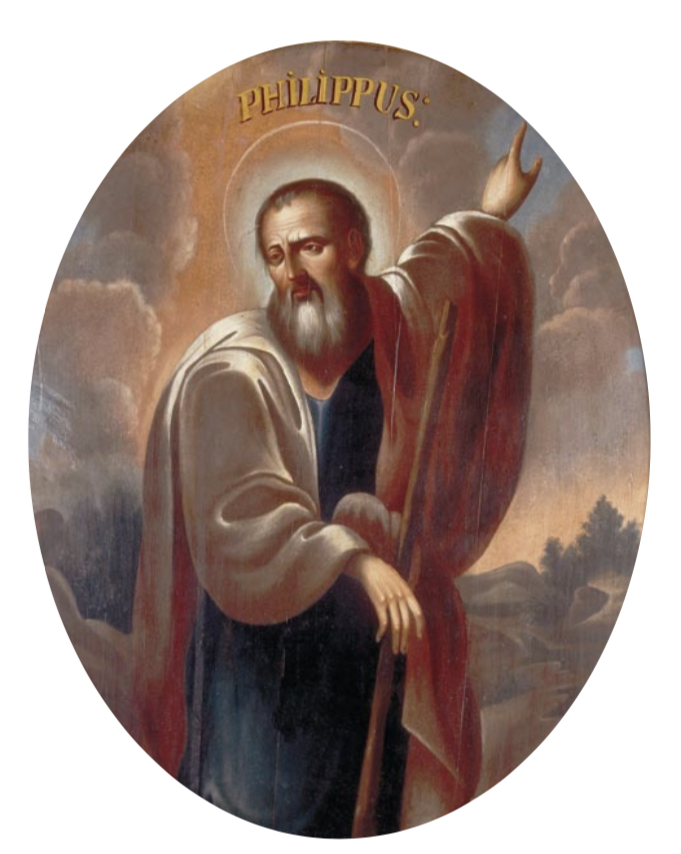
Philip the Apostle. Francisco Velásquez, 18th century

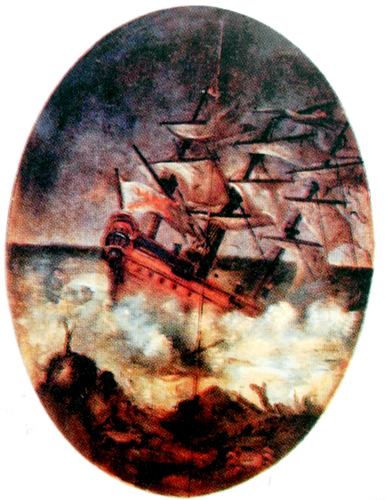
El milagro de Nuestra Señora a la nao perdida Hilaris, Diego José.1760-1790

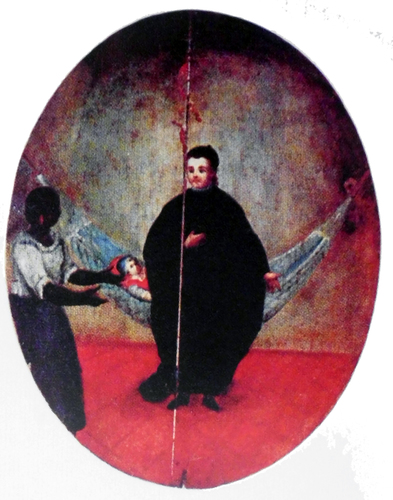
El niño asfixiado por el vicario y salvado por Nuestra Señora Hilaris, Diego Jose. 1760–1790

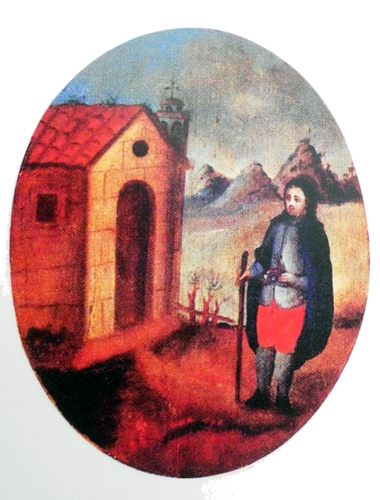
Autorretrato con santuario y montañas de Higüey Hilaris, Diego José. 1700–1799

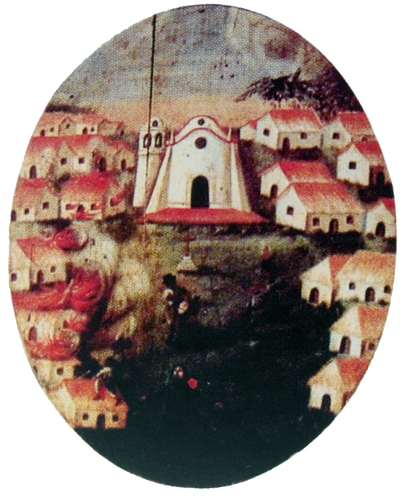
Santuario con vecindario de Higüey en llamas Hilaris, Diego José. 1760–1790

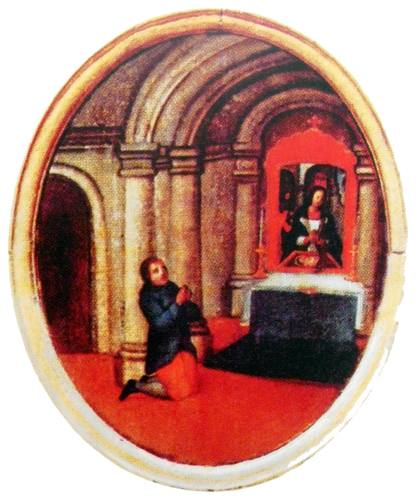
Nuestra Señora sana hombre tullido Hilaris, Diego José. 1760–1790

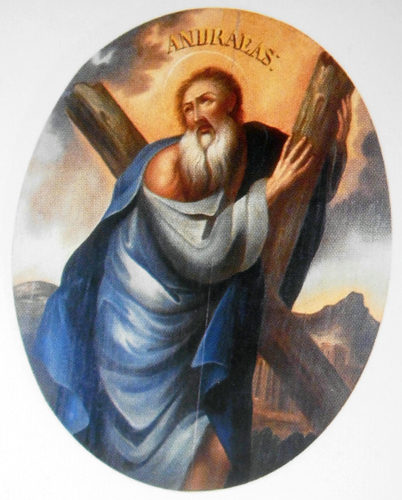
San Andrés. Velázquez, Francisco. 1700–1799

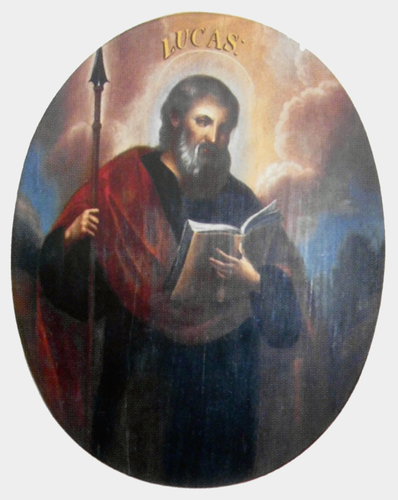
San Lucas, Velázquez, Francisco. 1700–1799

== 19th century – Origins of a national art ==
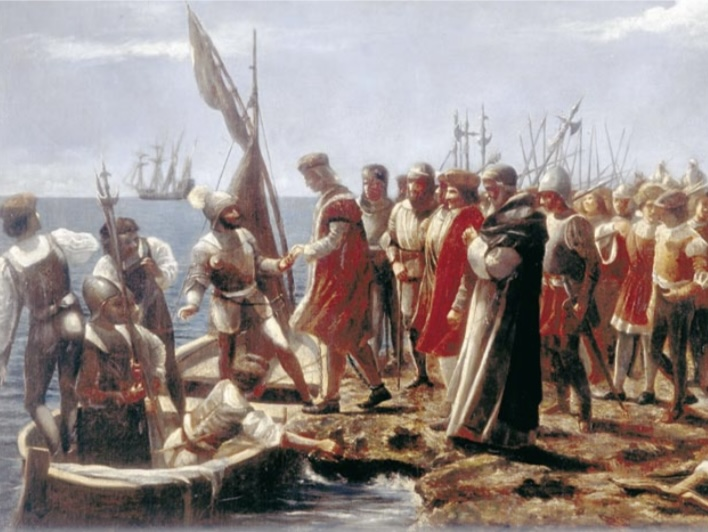
Colon engrillado. Luis Desangles without date.

Fine arts developed fairly late in Dominican Republic compared to many neighboring islands, however by the 1870s, the country was experiencing a flourishing of the arts. The repressive six-year period of Buenaventura Báez's government ended; the threat of annexation to the United States disappeared after the bill is rejected in the Senate; and in the beginning of 1874, a Constituent Assembly is called to reform the fundamental Charter of the country. This reform and others that take place later, all liberal in nature, along with the development of trade and the emergence of modern, albeit small, industries contributed to an atmosphere of optimism for the country. The founding of various teaching centers and civic societies that promoted the creation of artistic and literary works contributed to this societal reform and the flourishing of the arts.

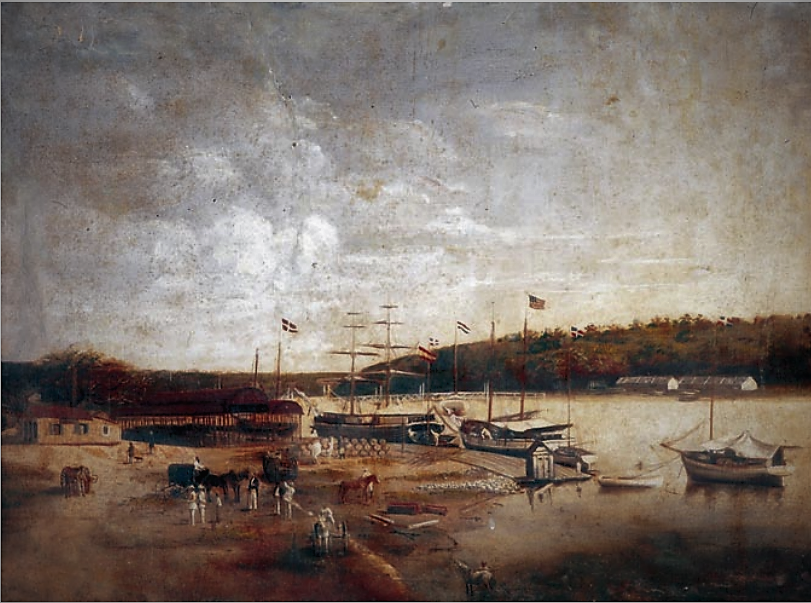
Alejandro Bonilla, Port of Santo Domingo. 1875

A whole generation of artists sprouted, meanwhile Puerto Rican social theorist, Eugenio Maria de Hostos's influence on educational, intellectual, and moral issues proliferated throughout the Antilles. His teachings influenced many intellectuals and artists of the time. Alejandro Bonilla was one of the first Dominican painters of importance who, after his exile in Venezuela, returned to his native country in 1874 and dedicated himself to teaching art. His teaching coincided with the arrival of foreign artists to the island such as Spanish painter José Fernández Corredor from Madrid, who arrived in Santo Domingo in 1883 on his way to Colombia, proclaimed "But what a Spanish city!" and stayed.

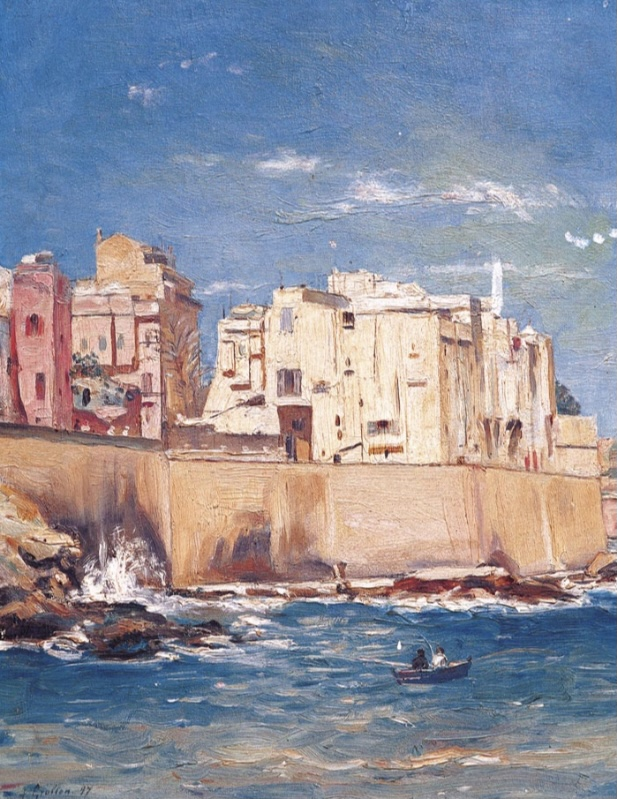
Paisaje argelino. Arturo Grullon 1897.

During his three-year stay, he came to teach at the Dominican capital, teaching a group of future artists who met there and became interconnected, including Abelardo Rodríguez Urdaneta, Arturo Grullón, Luis Desangles, Leopoldo Navarro, Américo Lugo, Máximo Grullón, Arquímedes de la Concha, Ángel Perdomo, Adolfo García Obregón, Alfredo Senior, Ramón Mella Ligthgow, Adriana Billini, among others. For the first time in the country's arts, a generation of native sculptors, photographers and painters formed. Their artistic compositions were mainly marked by Romanticism, Pictorialism, and Costumbrismo.

A new artistic space already established during this time in Santo Domingo was the workshop of Luis Desangles, who soon transformed into a young teacher and host of intellectual gatherings, attracting other artists, including former students of Corredor, like Rodríguez Urdaneta, Arturo Grullón, de la Concha, García Obregón, as well as new names like Carlos Ramírez Guerra, and Francisco González Lamarche.

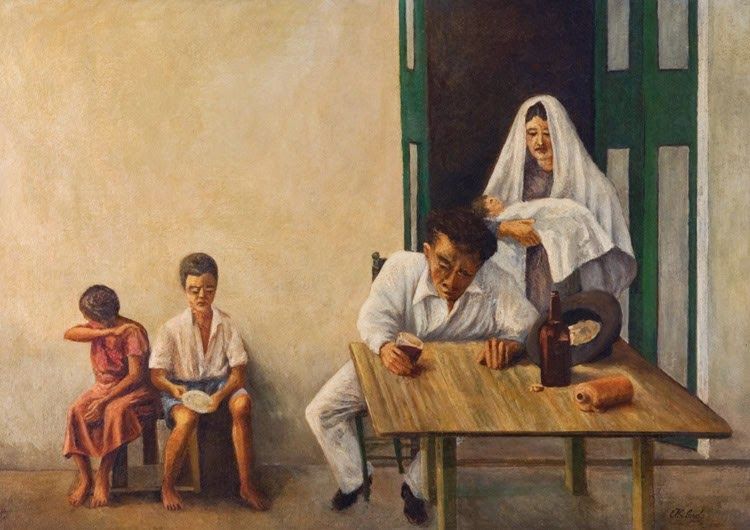
Abelardo Rodríguez Urdaneta. "Miseria Humana. c. unknown

In 1886, when dictator Ulises Heureaux stole the presidential election through blatant fraudulent means, defeating Casimiro de Moya (1849–1915) who was the democratic favorite, an armed uprising known as the Moya Revolution broke out in the Cibao, but promptly squashed. Heureaux perceived a conspiratorial movement against him that mostly involved disciples of de Hostos, prompting the teacher to leave the country and curtailing the positivist educational reform that had brought about progress in the educational system and cultural life to the country.

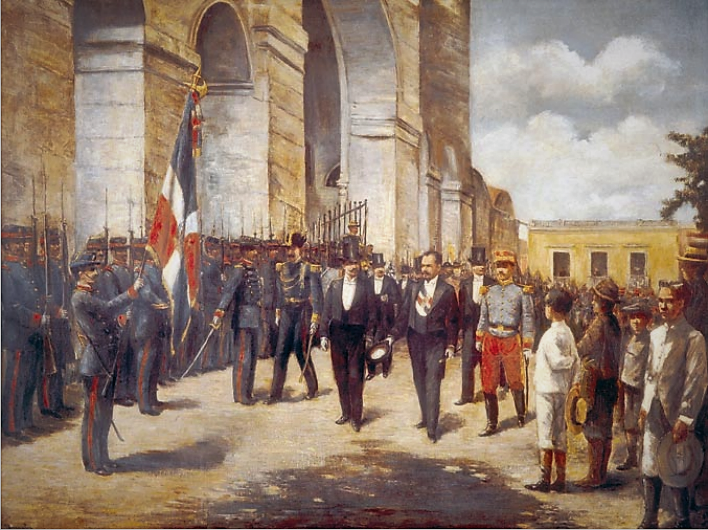
Desangles-Woss

One morning in February 1893 in Colón Park, at the foot of the colonizer's statue, a painting of President Heureaux hanging from a tree was found. Subsequent investigations led to the well-founded suspicion that this painting came from the workshop of Desangles. The depiction of the dictator's execution produced immediate consequences, including the closure of Luis Desangles's studio-school and his expatriation. Despite Heureaux's further consolidation of the country's first modern dictatorship, artists, writers, and intellectuals were ingrained with a new romantic attitude, manifested in youthful and militant artistic activism. In 1899 the dictator was assassinated in Moca.

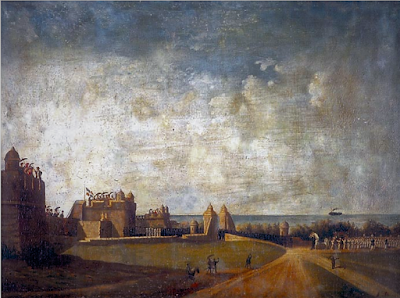
Alejandro Bonilla, Fúnebre entierro de Sánchez. 1875

Overall, the predominant styles of this era were Pictorialist, Realist, Costumbrismo, Neoclassical, Impressionist, and Romantic. The 19th century Dominican tendency of Romanticism is Antillean in style, and because of the politics of the time, extols Patriotism and love for the nation. Other elements of its Romantic tendency have to do with the surrounding nature, the still life and the traditional scene; this landscape is dominated by monotony, a melancholic atmosphere and of environmental loneliness, which is less an expression of the artist's feeling, but a condition of a social reality that is certainly desolate and poor. The most influential, stand out names of this first generation include Bonilla, Desangles, Navarro, Grullón, and Rodriguez Urdaneta.

=== Gallery ===
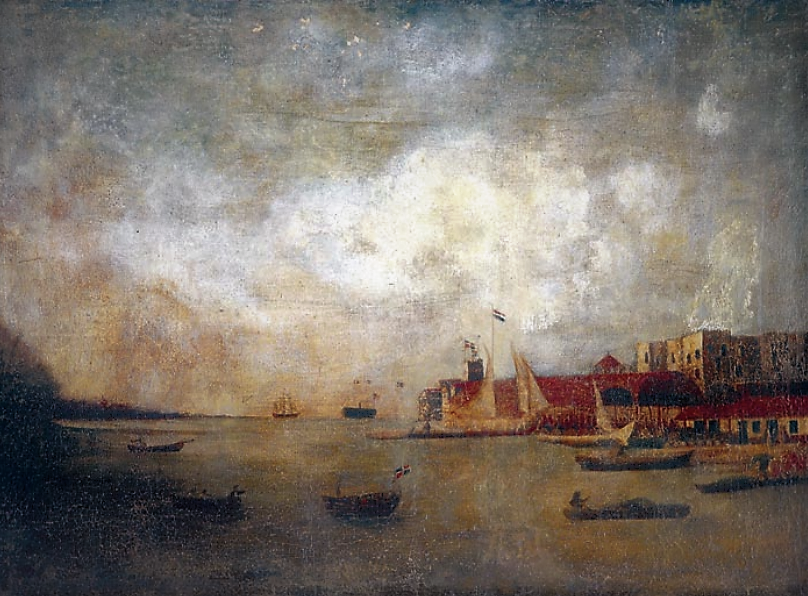
El Puerto sobre el Río Ozama. Alejandro Bonilla 1868

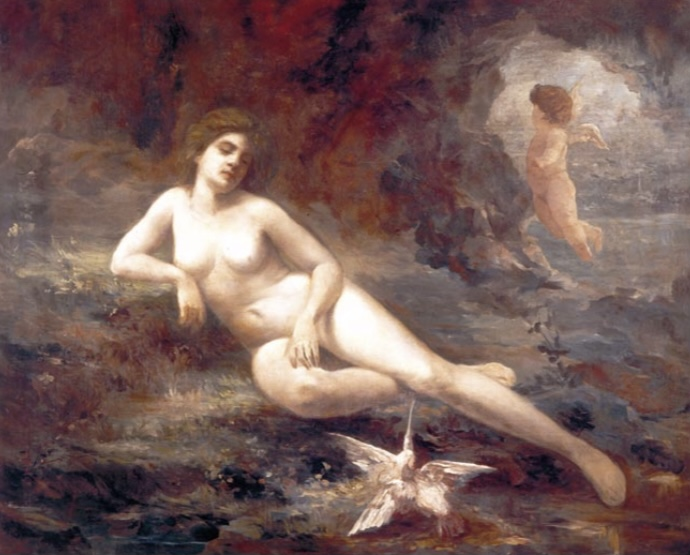
El amor que llega. Abelardo Rodriguez Urdaneta without date

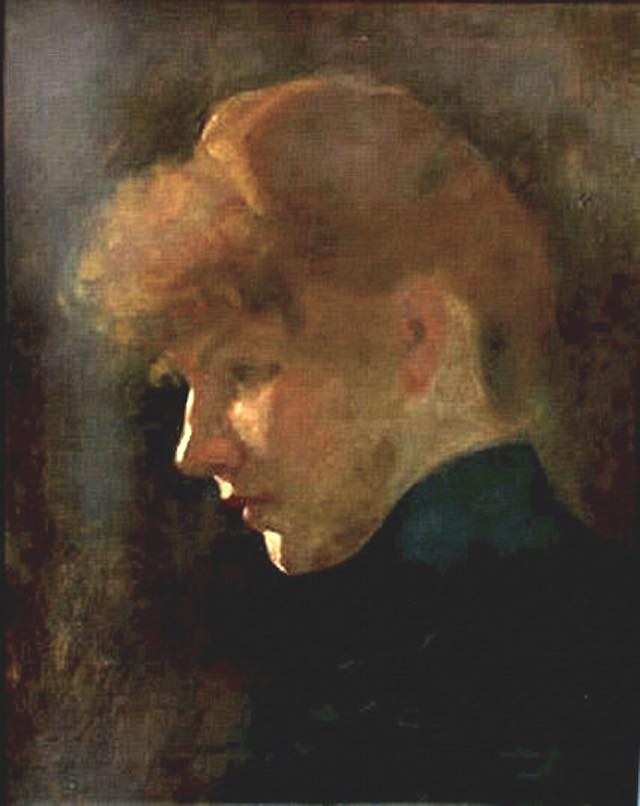
Abelardo Rodríguez Urdaneta. Perfil de Mujer, Year unknown / Sin fecha.

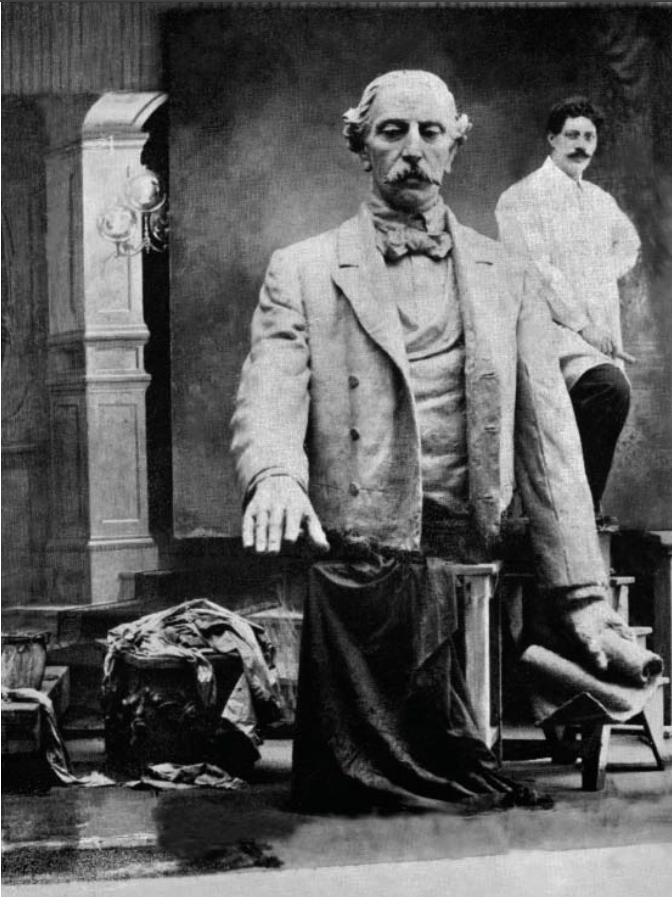
Abelardo Rodríguez Urdaneta. Self-portrait with Duarte bust. C. unknown

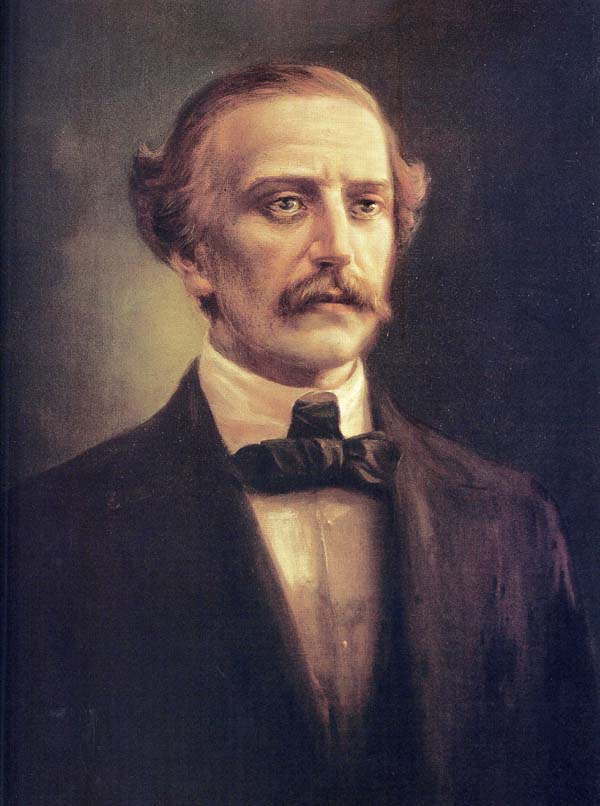
Oil portrait of Juan Pablo Duarte by Abelardo Rodríguez Urdaneta.

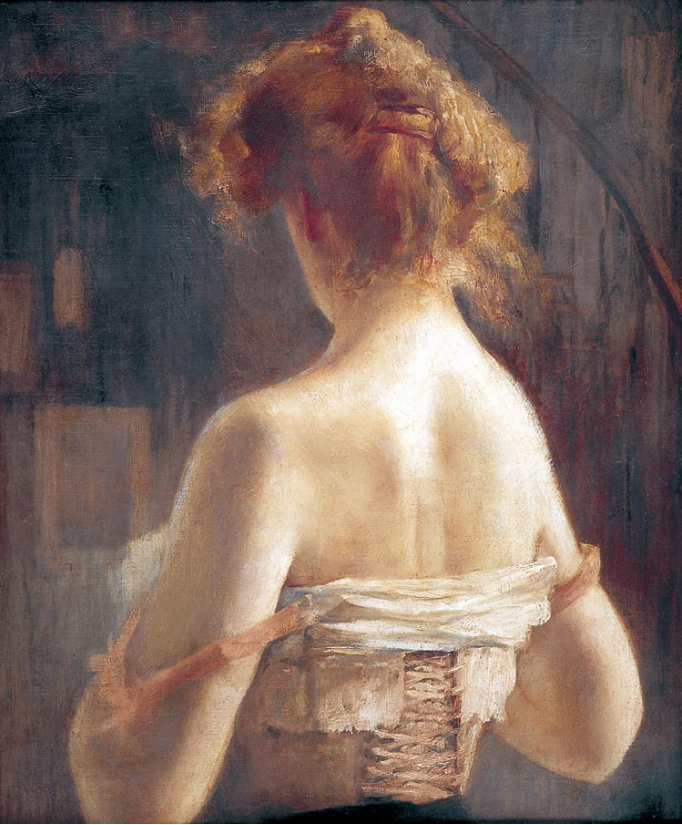
Abelardo Rodríguez Urdaneta. Urdaneta. Mujer de espalda. date unknown

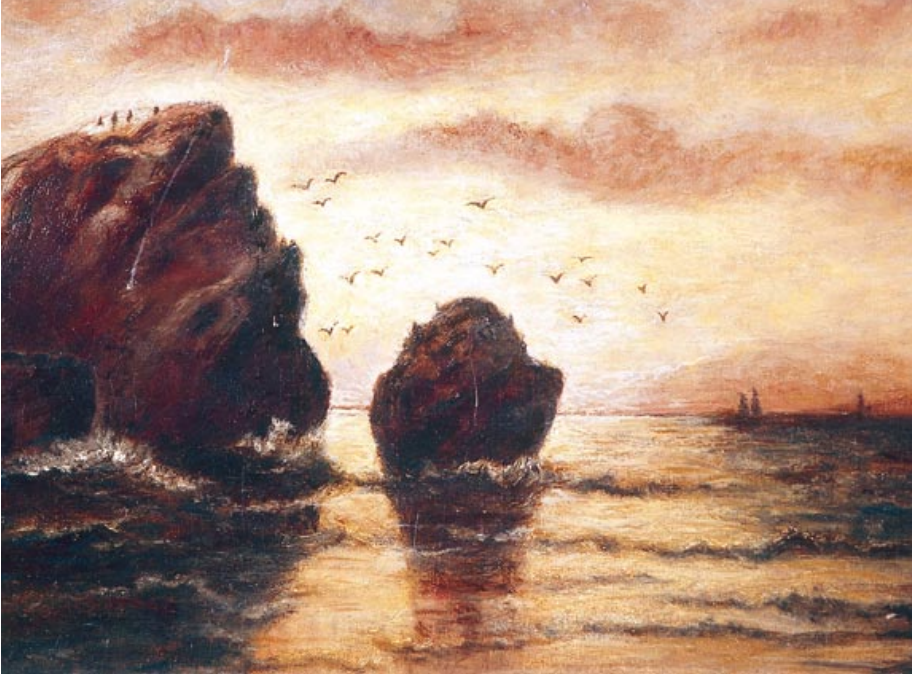
Abelardo Rodríguez Urdaneta. Marina. date unknown.

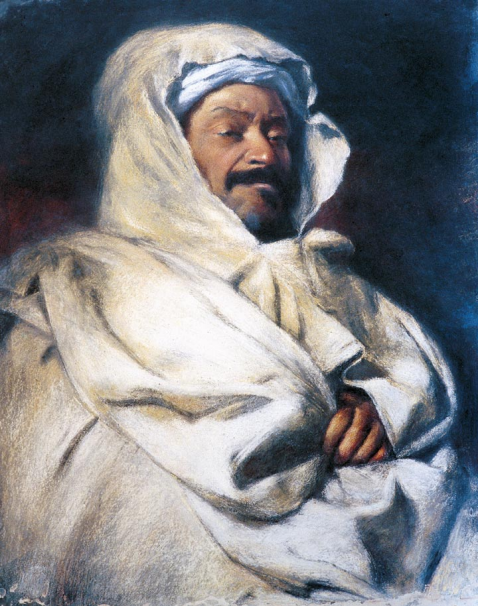
El Moro. Arturo Grullón. 1900

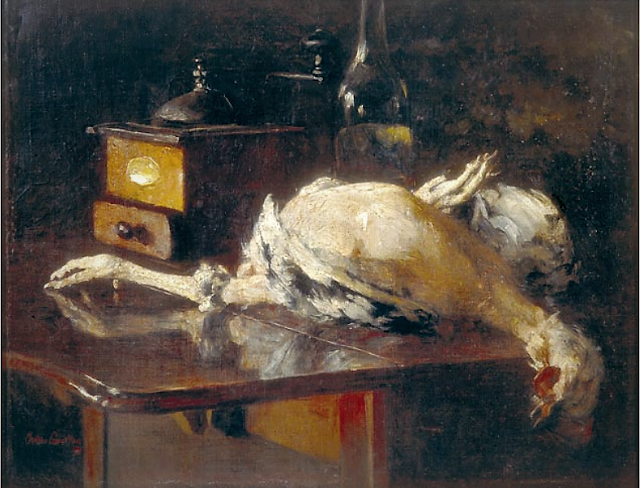
Arturo Grullon – Still life with bird, 1898

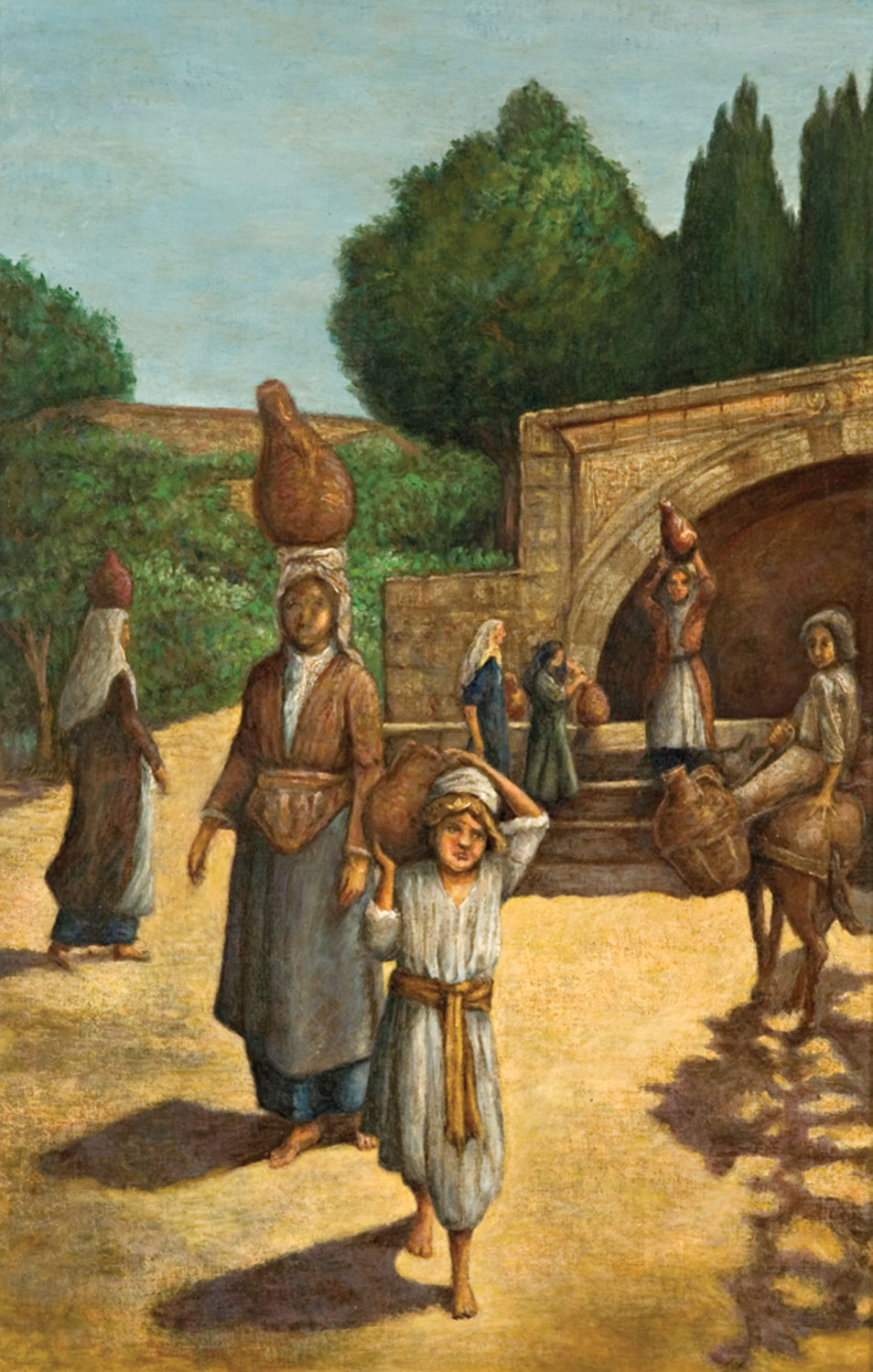
Arturo Grullon – Water from the fountain

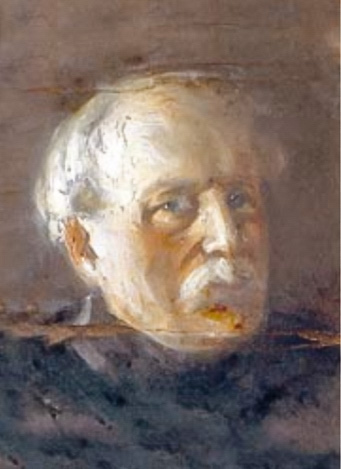
Grullon Retrato de Monsieur

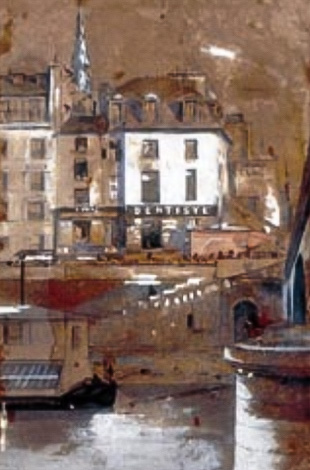
Grullón, Paisaje Urbano

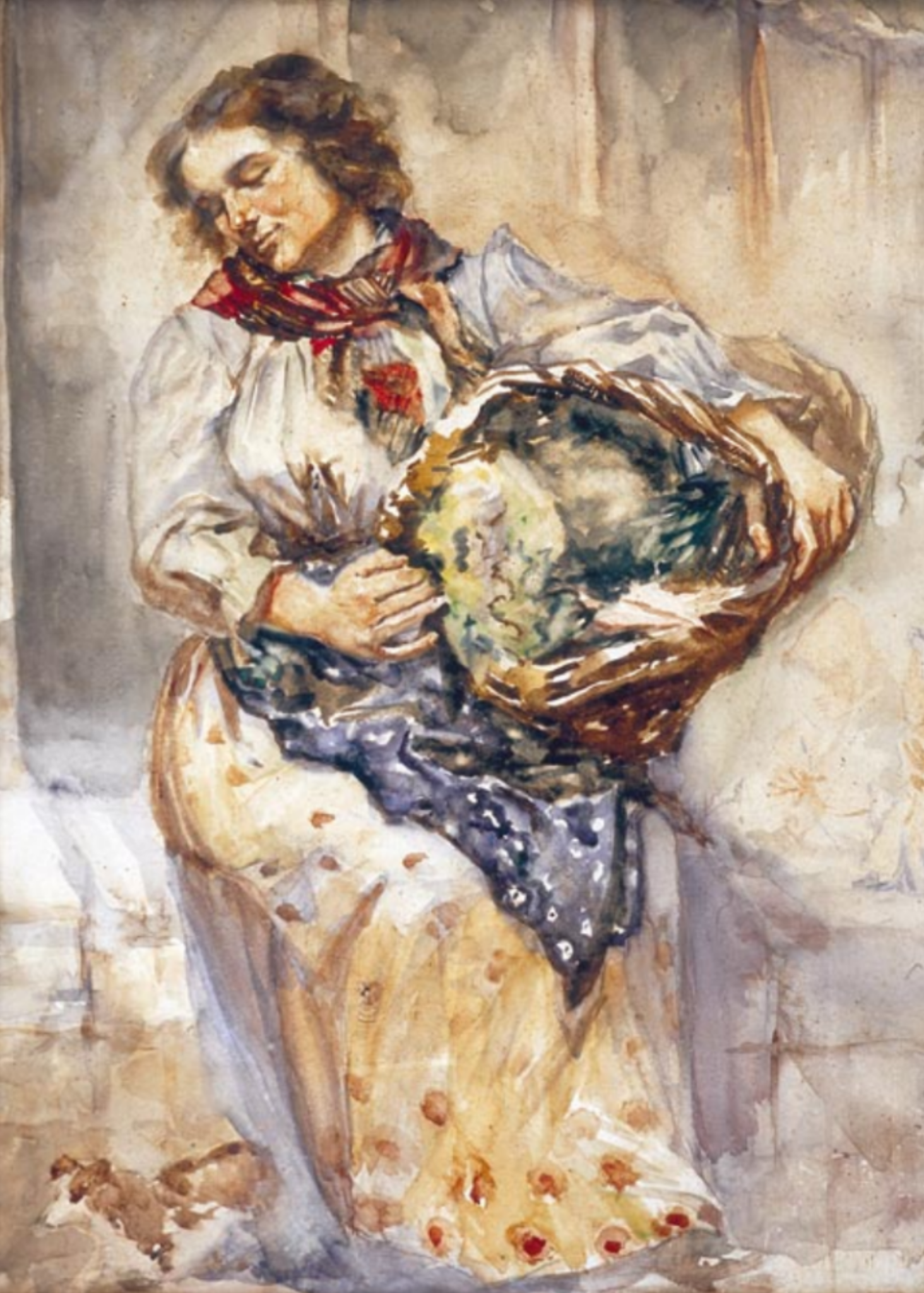
Canastera. Leopoldo Navarro 1900

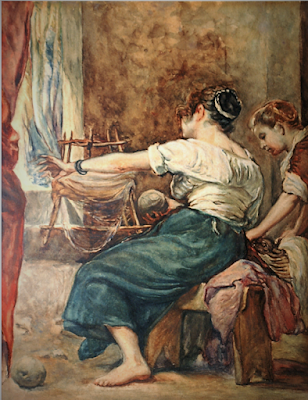
The Spinners Navarro

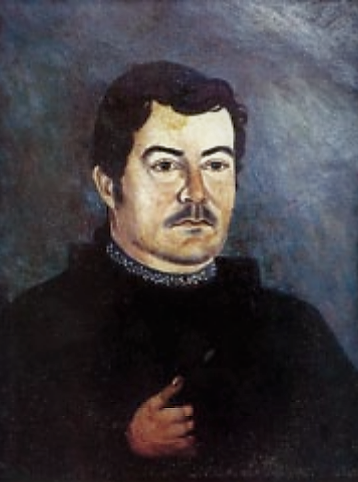
Portrait of Fernando Arturo de Meriño. Bonilla, without date

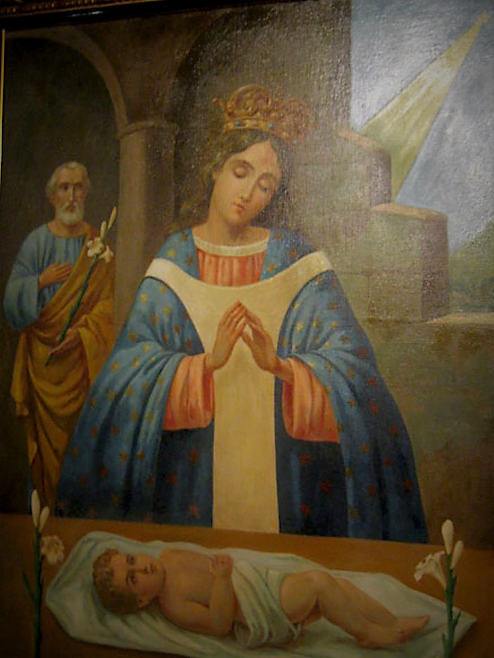
Virgen de Altagracia. Alejandro Bonilla. Finished in 1895

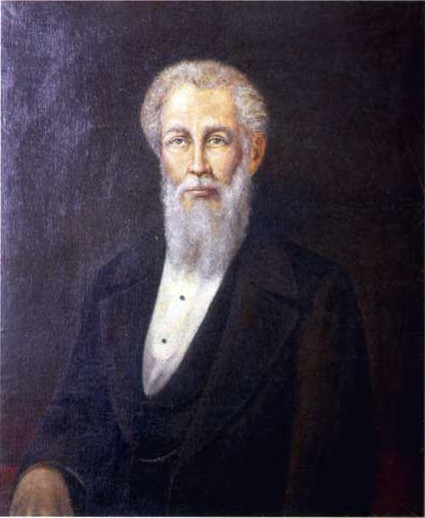
Retrato de Rafael de Marchena y de Solá. Alejandro Bonilla. Finished in 1890

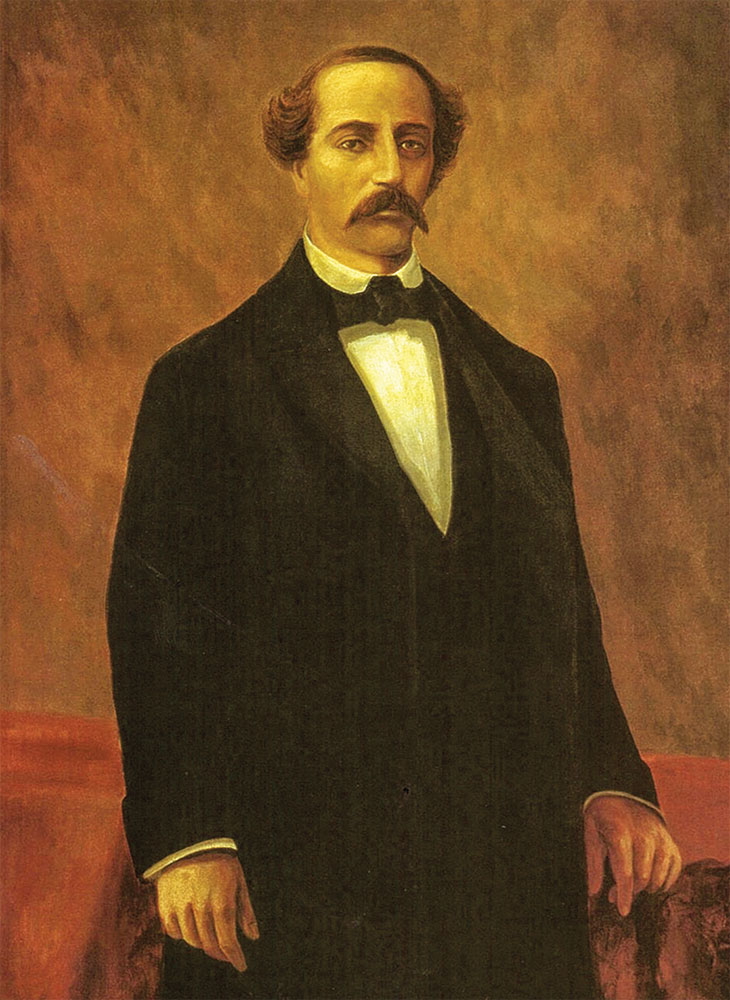
Juan Pablo Duarte. Alejandro Bonilla. Finished in 1887.

== 20th century – Modernism ==
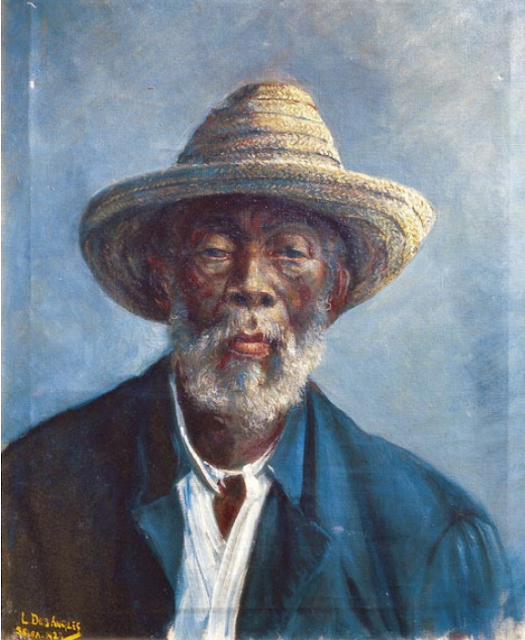
Cabeza de negro. Luis Desangles 1915

In the first decades of the 20th century, artistic styles passed down mostly unchanged to the artists considered part of the second generation of artists, which include Celeste Woss y Gil, Jaime Colson, Yoryi Morel, Dario Suro, Paul Giudicelli, Clara Ledesma, Ramón Oviedo, Guillo Pérez and Candido Bido, etc. These artists were the first to achieve true international success, exhibiting not only in Caribbean and Latin American countries, but also in the United States and Europe. More art schools opened up across the country, like Juan Bautista Gomez's art school established in Santiago de los Caballeros in 1920, teaching future artists like Joaquín Priego, Federico Izquierdo, and Yoryi Morel; Celeste Woss y Gil's art school studio in 1924 in Santo Domingo and a second one in 1931 after returning from New York; and Enrique Garcia-Godoy, who established an arts school in La Vega in 1930. These three schools would later go on to influence the development of Naturalism, Costumbrismo, and Pictorialist production in Dominican Republic, among other styles. Moreover, after dictator Rafael Trujillo assumes complete control of the government, he establishes the National School of Fine Arts (ENBA) and the museum La Primera Exposición Nacional de Artes Plásticas (First National Exhibition of Plastic Arts) in Santo Domingo in 1942. The ENBA becomes a fundamental center for artistic training in the country.

Beginning in 1939, European refugees mostly from Spain, arrived to Santo Domingo. The impact that the Republicans caused in the capital city was expressed in various ways, starting with the alteration of nightlife since the Spanish were used to everything at later hours; they founded cinemas, multiplied cafes, and established restaurants. In addition to nighttime recreation, these European refugees, including Central European Jewish exiles, also favorably influenced intellectual and university development, since many of them were academics, writers, and artists of various manifestations: like musicians, theater players, sculptors, painters and craftsmen. Some artists residing in Santo Domingo during this time include Josep Gausachs, Manolo Pascual, Juan Bautista Acher, Saul Steimberg, Kurt Schnitzer, George Hausdorf, José Vela Zanetti, Francisco Vásquez Díaz, Antonio Bernad Gonzálvez, Ernesto Lothar, Josep Rovira, Francisco Dorado, Mounia André, Joaquín de Alba, Hans Pape, Ana María Schwartz, Alejandro Solana Ferrer, and many others. The legacy these Spanish and Central European exiles have on Dominican art is evident in the approach to Avant-garde styles like Surrealism and Abstraction seen in the works of the first generations of students in ENBA, who learned under the tutelage of Gausachs, Pascual, Vela Zanetti, Lothar and Hausdorf.

=== Impressionism and Expressionism ===
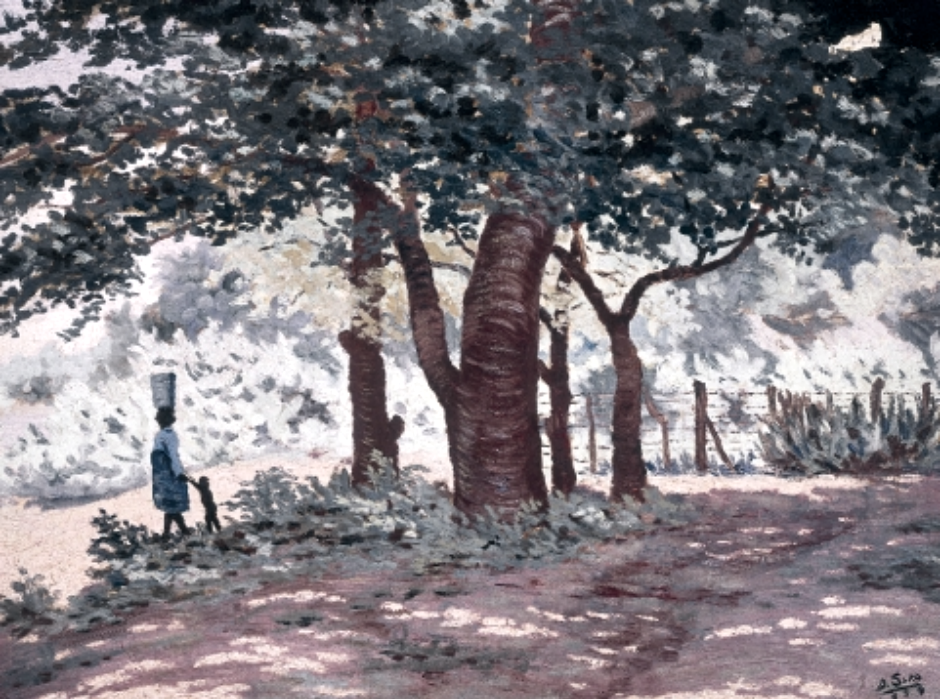
Paisaje con mujer y niños. Dario Suro 1930

Impressionism as an artistic language has been present since the earliest days of Dominican art, almost inseparable from naturalism, considering many naturalist artists painted with impressionistic tones and vice versa. Dario Suro is considered the leading Dominican impressionist, but other artists influenced by the style include Desangles, Juan Bautista Gómez, Celeste Woss y Gil, Delia Weber, Enrique Garcia-Godoy, Yoryi Morel, Federico Izquierdo, and Aída Ibarra. Morel is most well known as the representative of Dominican pictorialist costumbrismo. The more naturalist painters are considered to be Tuto Báez, Juana García de Concepción, Genoveva Báez, Rafael Arzeno, and Servio Certad. Painters from the 1950–1990 generation with impressionist tendencies are: Mario Grullón, Marianela Jiménez, Xavier Amiama, Nidia Serra, Jacinto Domínguez, Pluntarco Andújar, Rafi Vásquez, among others.

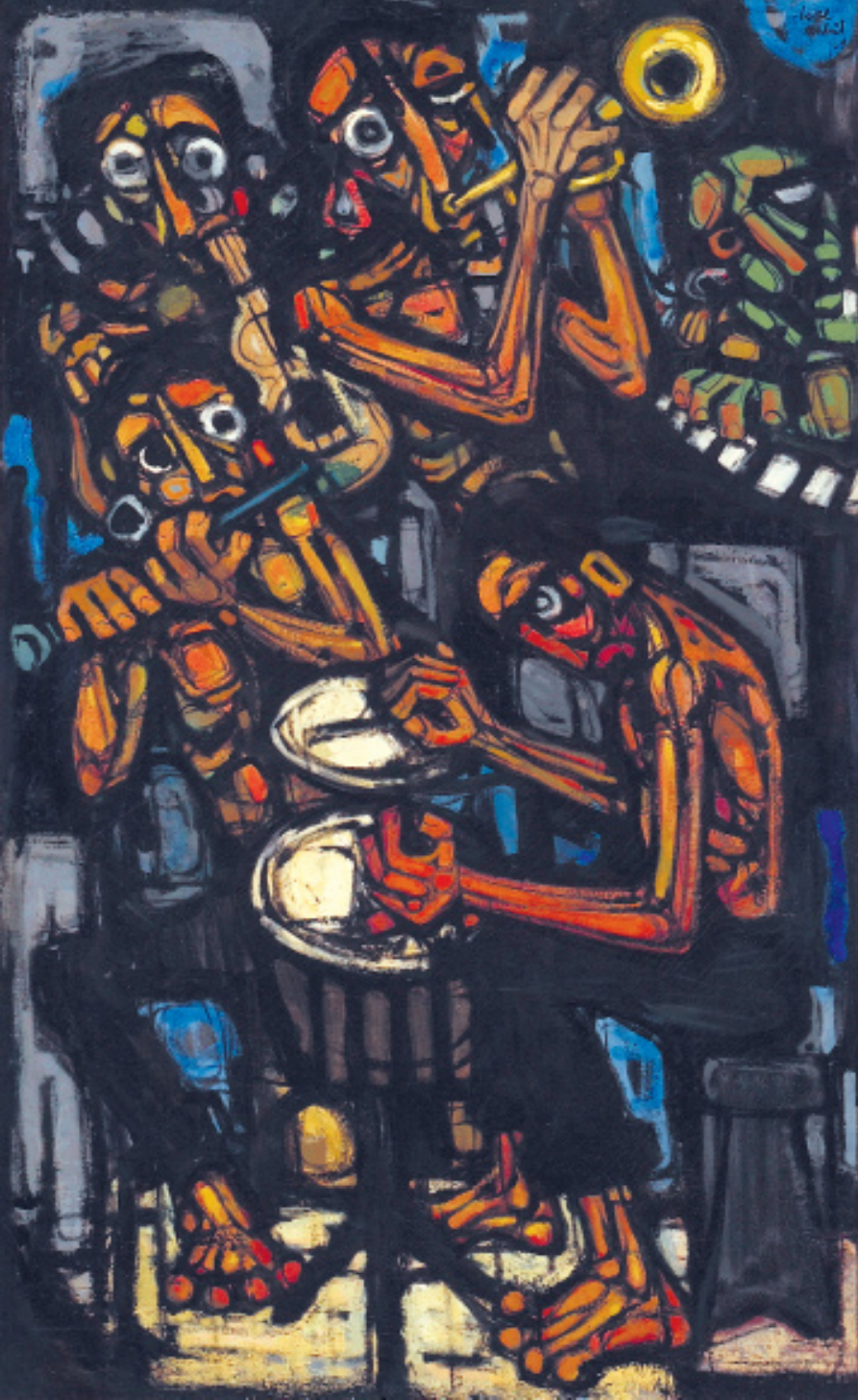
Musicos. Leopoldo Perez 1964

In the 1940s there was also Dominican Expressionism. Many artists of this era created expressionist as well as impressionist works, including Dario Suro, Delia Weber, and Yoryi Morel. Expressionism manifested itself as an artistic movement that opposes the external, superficial and illusory forms of Impressionism, its essential characteristic being the expression of internal sensations, internal motivation, and intimate passion. During the 1960s, the continuity of expressionism came from Gilberto Hernandez Ortega, Eligio Pichardo, Dario Suro, Jaime Colson, Silvano Lora, Paul Giudicelli, Ramon Oviedo, Clara Ledesma Guillo Perez, Jose Rincón Mora, Leopoldo Perez Lepe, Xavier Amiama, and Asdrubal Dominguez. During the 1960s Expressionism was the dominant art style but what distinguishes this second era of Dominican expressionism is a social agenda closely linked to the subversion and oppression that increased at the end of the Trujillo dictatorship, as well as the civic upheavals produced in the process that follows tyrannicide: armed uprising, poverty, and social exploitation; war and death become popular subjects for these social expressionists, evoked in an aesthetic clouded with a cold, dark, violent atmosphere and the deformation in the figurative representations and landscape.

=== Abstractionism ===
During the 1940s Dominican abstractionism emerged as a visual language with Neohumanist and Cubist Jaime Colson's neocubism, or colonial cubism, that expresses a Caribbean racial and tropical reality that contrasts Cubism's continental one. The cubist tendency that developed in Dominican art is that of the black Antillean world, "the intimate drama of the tormented life of man and through the music that elevates him", wrote Colson. The Colsonian neo-cubist style became a national trend during the 1950s and onwards, with more than one conscious imitator appearing in each decade, like Paul Giudicelli, Dario Suro, Clara Ledesma, Rafael Faxas, Domingo Liz, Eligio Pichardo, and Dionisio Pichardo. Colonial cubism can also be appreciated as a Dominican, Caribbean and even Antillean style, since its aesthetic is assumed in several countries like Haiti, Puerto Rico, and other islands as a result of Colson's influence.

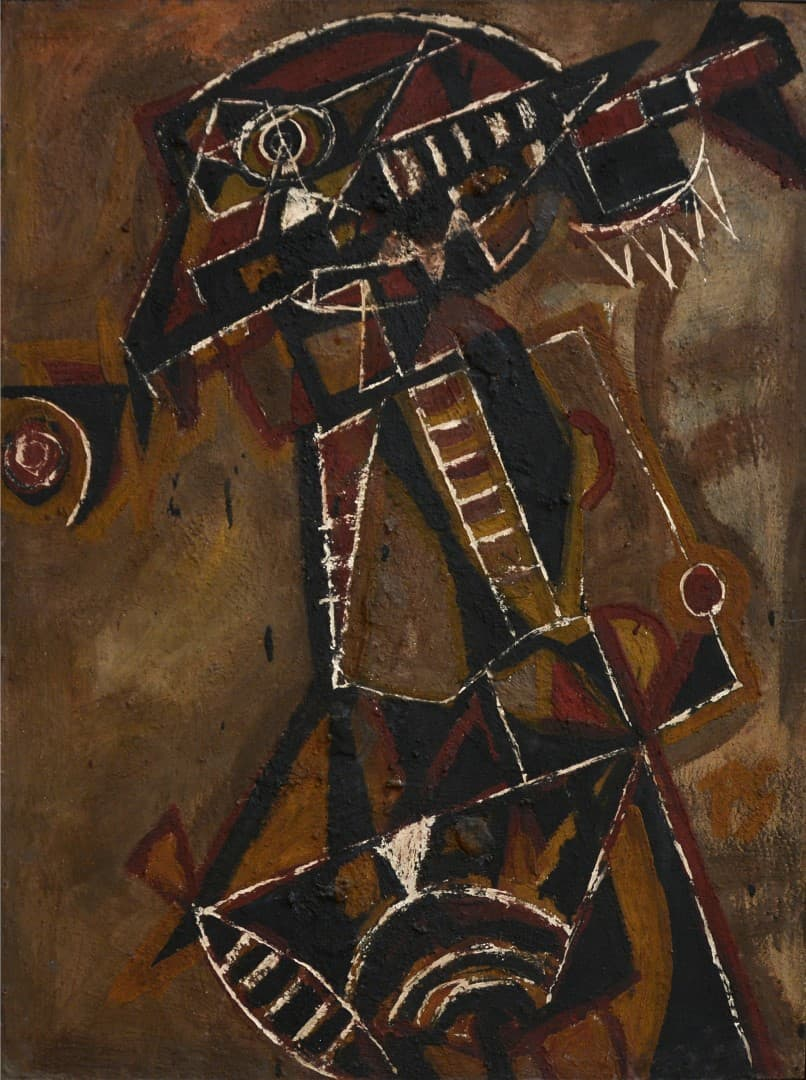
Soldado disparando. Paul Giudicelli

In the 1950s and 1960s, three eclectic abstract expressionist painters rose to prominence: Eligio Pichardo, Guillo Pérez and Paul Giudicelli. Of these three, Giudicelli is the one who formally defined himself as an abstract expressionist. Other important artists that produced abstract works are Gilberto Hernandez Ortega, Dario Suro, Jacinto Dominguez, Ada Balcear, Tito Canepa, Silvano Lora, Elsa Núñez, and Delia Weber, Fernando Peña Defilló, Norbeto Santana, Jose Perdomo, Clara Ledema, Dionisio Pichardo, and Luichy Martínez Richiez.

=== Surrealism ===
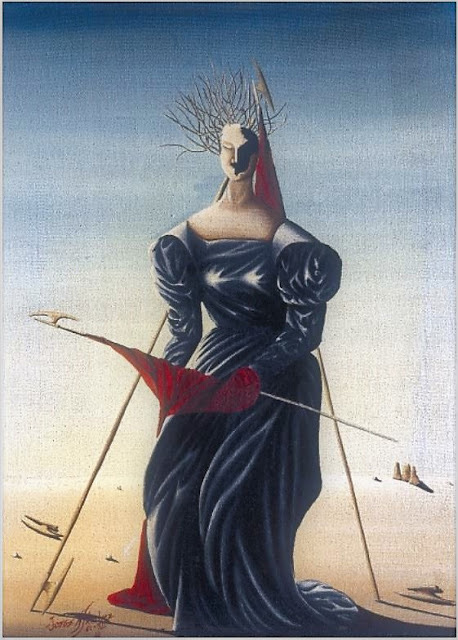
Dama Ignota. Jorge Noceda 1962

In 1941, the founder of Surrealism, Andre Breton, landed in Santo Domingo with his family, Cuban painter Wilfredo Lam, Russian writer Victor Serge, surrealist Pierre Mabille, and German communist writer Anna Seghers. Seeking refuge on the island away from the Second World War that was enveloping Europe, they stayed for a short time and regularly in the company of Eugenio Fernández Granell, the Spanish painter and predominant surrealist on the island. Just two years later, Granell would become one of the foundational creators of Poesia Sorprendida, the surrealist avant-garde literary magazine and movement in 1943. Dominican surrealism as a movement grew with the presence of these major surrealists during the 1950s and succeeding decades. The clearest and most perennially affiliated of these native surrealists is Jorge Noceda. His characteristics involve a focus on fleeting and virtual aspects of waking life, associating many elements of nature (flowers, fruits, birds, ...) in dreamlike visions suggestive of fantasy and memory. Surrealism in the Dominican Republic had even more strong supporters who created unique works including Jaime Colson, Ivan Tovar, Gilberto Hernández Ortega, Luis Oscar Romero, and Jose Felix Moya. Other artists who produced works with touches of surreality are Dario Suro, Clara Ledesma, Tito Canepa, Eligio Pichardo, Dionisio Pichardo, and Hilario Rodriguez.

=== New Figuration or Nueva Figuración ===
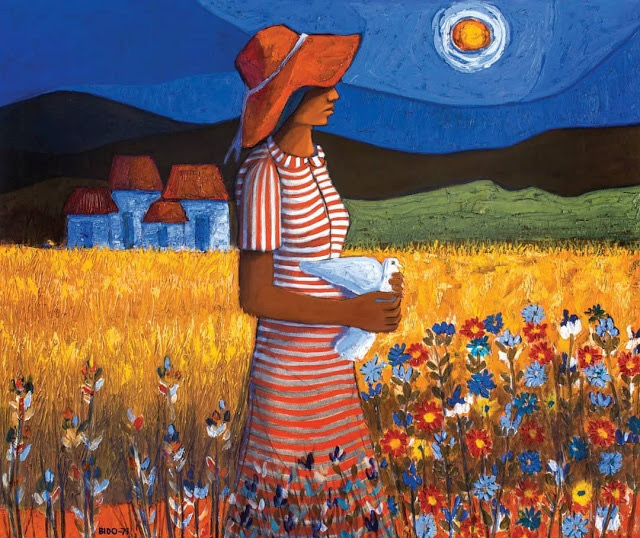
Candido Bido – Morning Walk (Paseo de la Mañana), 1979

Nueva Figuracion or New Figuration was a revival of figurative art in Europe and America in the 1960s and 1970s following a period dominated by abstraction. The term Dominican New Figuration was coined by the critic and poet Jeannette Miller in 1972, of which she points out Fernando Peña Defilló, a principal abstract painter, as the artist who creates the conditions of what has been called Dominican New Figuration. Another artist associated with the movement is Candido Bido. His style of Dominican neofigurativism centers paradise, floral, erotic, pictorial, lyrical, mythical, symbolic, dreamy, and terrestrial themes of the Dominican, Haitian, and Caribbean land. Danicel and Justo Susana are other important artists of this movement.

=== Island pop art ===
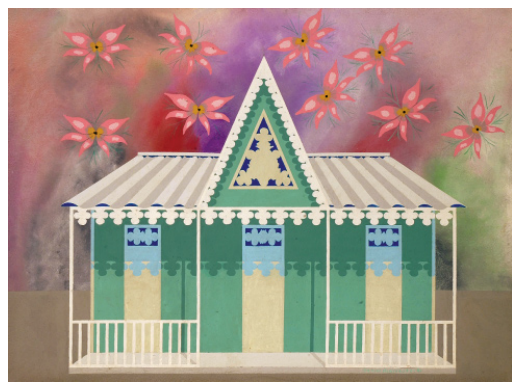
Casita Dominicana, by Daniel Henriquez 1989

Pop art is a figurative art whose aesthetic is based on everyday consumerism and images that come from advertising, photography, television, and other mass media. The simple reproducible image, cold and without any contained emotion of pop art challenged the conventions of fine arts, rising in popularity with young artists during the 1960s and 70s. Daniel Henriquez is the most prominent Dominican pop artists, drawn by kitsch representations of the popular dwelling, equally Dominican and Antillian. Jorge Severino is another important artist associated with Dominican pop.

=== 1980s generation ===
The generation of 1980 marked a fruitful moment for artistic creation, vitally decisive for the reactivation of the imagination in Santo Domingo. Collective Generation 80, coined by Laura Gil, were members of group of young graduates of the National School of Fine Arts between the late 1970s and early 1970s who revolved almost in unison around the goal for creative freedom, yet separated by multiple goals and ideas. The eighties are the only generation of artists that formed a militant cohesion, defined not as members in a group, but as a collective spirit, where the magical and surreal seems to assert itself with much greater emphasis than the expressionist. «Figurative and abstract, magical, hyperrealistic and surrealist influence. Their heads or leaders are: Gabino Rosario, Hamlet Rubio, Germán Olivares, Persio Checo, José Ramón Medina, Genaro Phillips, Hilario Olivo, Jorge Pineda, Belkis Ramírez, Tony Capellan, Gabino Rosario, Octavio Paniagua, Elvis Aviles, Luz Severino, Carlos Hinojosa, Dionisio Plubio de la Paz, Magdeleno Portorreal, to name a few.

== Art Museums in Dominican Republic ==
- Museo Alcazar Colón, Santo Domingo
- Museo de Arte Moderno, Santo Domingo
- Museo Arqueológico, Altos de Chavón
- Museo de Arte Folklórico Tomás Morel, Santiago
- Museo de Arte Taíno, Puerto Plata
- Museo de la Familia Dominicana, Santo Domingo
- Museo del Hombre Dominicano, Santo Domingo
- Centro León, Santiago de los Caballeros
- The Museo Bellapart, Santo Domingo
- Casa de Arte de Sosúa, Sosúa
- Museo Cándido Bidó, Nagua
