= Josep Rovira Soler =

Catalan artist

Josep Rovira i Soler (6 February 1900 – 1998) was a Catalan painter especially notable for his portraits.

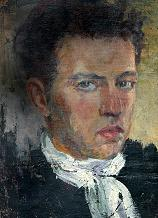
Josep Rovira's self-portrait; this was his first painting.

== Biography ==
His parents were Catalans who traveled to Cuba to help in their family's tobacco business. And he was born in Santiago de Cuba sick of malaria. He had very poor health until he was finally cured in the ship returning to Spain at the age of two.

His family lived in Vilafranca del Penedès some years making a living in the wine business, then they went to Cuba again and lived there for two years. When they returned to Spain he started going to school where he showed he had a gift for painting, though not for academic work.

At the age of 20 he started studying at the painting school La Llotja in Barcelona, and he did for 2 years. One of his school friends who had been studying there for several years decided to quit, downhearted, when he saw the easiness, he showed from the first moment.

He won a scholarship to go to Italy and another to study in Madrid.

While painting in Cadaqués when he was 35 years old, he met his wife, Mercè Forns Sant Genís, who was 15 years younger than him. She was watching from the balcony, and he attracted her attention because he sang while painting. The Spanish Civil War prevented them from getting married and they had a relationship by mail during the four years he stayed in Cuba, till finally when the war ended, he returned to Barcelona to get married.

What he most enjoyed was painting portraits. He had a special ability to show the psychology of the character with just some strokes. The rest of his work is set in Catalonia and in Cuba (1936–1939).

== Additional information ==
- You can read a more extended version of this article in the Catalan Wikipedia, and also in
- Obra pictórica de Josep Rovira Soler
- http://joseprovira.artelista.com
