= Cándido Bidó =

Dominican painter and fine artist

- Born: Cándido Bidó Ventura; May 20, 1936; Bonao, Dominican Republic
- Died: March 7, 2011 (aged 74); Santo Domingo, Dominican Republic
- Education: National School of Fine Arts (Santo Domingo)
- Known for: Painting

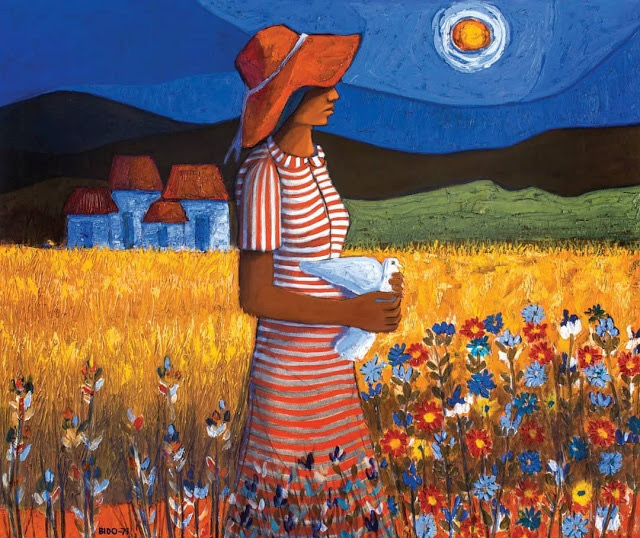
Candido Bido - Morning Walk (Paseo de la Mañana), 1979

Cándido Bidó Ventura (20 May 1936 – 7 March 2011) was a Dominican painter and fine artist. His paintings highlighted Creole customs, nature, and landscapes. There is a museum in his honor named the Galería de Arte Cándido Bidó in Bonao, Dominican Republic. He was the first painter from the Dominican Republic to have an exhibition in France.

== Biography ==
Cándido Bidó Ventura was born on 20 May 1936 in Bonao, Monseñor Nouel, Dominican Republic. He studied at the Altos de Chavón School of Design (Escuela de Altos de Chavon).

He was an art professor at the National School of Arts. In 1962 he worked as assistant professor at the National School of Arts and between 1962 and 1967 he was a Faculty professor at National School of Arts of Drawing and Arts. He founded in Santo Domingo Dominican Republic, Cándido Bidó Art Center, where he taught painting, drawing, and sculpting. In 1987 he closed the art center and left the Cándido Bidó Art Gallery in Santo Domingo.

He founded the Cultural Center Plaza in Bonao, Dominican Republic de Bonao and the Cándido Bidó Art Museum, in Bonao, Dominican Republic. 1987. He also founded the School of Arts of the Dominican Air Force in Santo Domingo in 1996.

== Themes ==
The sun is the hallmark of much of Bidó's work and his colors are intense. Sun-hot colors were so integral to Bidó's work that the gallery sold small cans of his signature paints, custom colors he created himself: blazing yellows, turquoise-sea blues and fiery shades of orange.

== Collections ==
Santo Domingo's major art museum, the Galería de Arte Moderno, has a collection of Bidó's paintings. His work is also displayed at the Fundación Bonao Para La Cultura, the organization he started in his hometown of Bonao to provide art education, entertainment, and cultural facilities to the Cibao community.
