= Grullón =

Grullón is a surname. Notable people with the surname include:

- Alejandro Grullón (1929–2020), Dominican banker and businessman
- Arturo Grullón (1869–1942), Dominican painter, ophthalmologist, and educator
- Deivy Grullón (born 1996), Dominican baseball catcher
- Juan Isidro Jimenes Grullón (1903–1983), Dominican essayist, historian, physician, philosopher, educator, and politician
- Manuel Alejandro Grullón (born 1953), Dominican businessman
