= Espaillat =

Espaillat may refer to:

== Places ==
- Espaillat Province, a province in the Dominican Republic

== People ==
- Adriano Espaillat (born 1954), Dominican-born American politician, U.S. Representative for New York's 13th congressional district. Great-grandson of Ulises Espaillat.
- Alejandro Enrique Grullón Espaillat (1929–2020), Dominican banker. Great-great-grandson of Ulises Espaillat.
- Catherine Espaillat, American astronomer
- Francisco Espaillat (1734–1807), French-born Dominican surgeon, Lieutenant-Governor of Santo Domingo for the Northern region and planter.
- Rhina Espaillat (born 1932), Dominican-born American poet, fourth-great-granddaughter of Dr. Santiago Espaillat (President-elect of the Dominican Republic) and fifth-great-granddaughter of Francisco Espaillat.
- Ulises Espaillat (1823–1878), author and politician, Senator and President of the Dominican Republic, grandson of Francisco Espaillat.

== Sports ==
- Espaillat Men (volleyball club), male volleyball team of Espaillat Province
- Espaillat Women, female volleyball team of Espaillat Province
