= CDN 37 =

Dominican Republic television network

CDN Channel 37
- Type: Broadcast radio and television, cable, Internet, and satellite.
- Country: Dominican Republic
- Founded: 1998 by Banco Popular Dominicano
- Headquarters: Avenida Doctor Fernando Arturo Defillo No. 4, Los Prados – Santo Domingo, R.D.
- Owner: Ing. Manuel Estrella, Ing. Félix García
- Key people: Alba Nelys Familia
- Launch date: 1998 CDN Channel 37
- Picture format: 1080i HDTV (downscaled to 16:9 480i for the SDTV feed)
- Official website: CDN Channel 37

CDN Channel 37 (Cadena de Noticias TV S.A.) is a Dominican commercial broadcasting company founded in 1996, broadcasting on channel number 37.

== History ==
CDN was founded on January 1, 1996, by the Dominican Popular Bank, broadcasting on Channel Number 37. It produces news, special coverage, and sports content. In 1999, CDN added more reporters and broadcasts. The content was diversified into productions covering the distinct areas of art, health, economy, debates and opinion. CDN also created a digital platform to expand its scope. They are the official channel of Major League Baseball in the Dominican Republic.

In 2005, CDN news and sports was included in the group Multimedios del Caribe led by Manuel Estrella and Félix García.

Another channel, CDN2, was launched in 2008. It contained alternative programs for all ages, and in 2014 it became the only Dominican television channel specializing in 24-hour sports coverage, now with the name of CDN SportsMax.

In 2013, CDN was relaunched in alliance with Provider, S.A., led by the journalist Nuria Piera, to investigate high-level national and international affairs. Piera has hosted the show Nuria: Journalistic Investigation on CDN for 29 years. They formed NCDN – a new format that offers a different perspective on the production and content of the programming. Their interactive online broadcasting platform and technology was also overhauled.

In 2015 news Spanish anchor Pere Pont worked there as the international news editor.

In 2018 Nuria Piera left the channel's company to Alba Nelys Familia. That same year, it signed an agreement with New York's Canal América on the Optimum platform, enabling the channel to air CDN's programming.

== Target demographic ==
CDN content is appropriate for all ages and demographics.

== Broadcast extent ==
CDN is broadcast at the national level in the Dominican Republic. Internationally, it is available online.

CDN Channel 37 is a broadcast television station in Santo Domingo, Dominican Republic, providing news and entertainment for the Dominican Republic

== International alliances with other established media ==
- VOA – Voice of America - United States
- New York 1 – News - United States
- NTN24 - Latin America
- CB24 – Central America
- DW – Deutsche Welle - Germany
- RT – Russia Today - Russia
- CCTV – China
- Sistema TV - Puerto Rico
- Canal 15 - Nicaragua
- MTN Mundo TV – Honduras
- Canal 10 - Uruguay
- América TV – Peru
- RCN – Colombia
- Canal 13 – Chile
- Canal 21 – Panama
- Mega Visión – El Salvador

== International coverage ==
CDN has covered the following international events:

- Honras Fúnebres al Presidente Hugo Chávez – Venezuela
- Elecciones Presidenciales en Venezuela – Candidato electo: Nicolás Maduro
- Elección del Obispo Jorge Mario Bergoglio como el nuevo Papa de la Iglesia Católica – Roma, Italia, Papa Francisco.
- Cumbre Iberoamericana – Veracruz, México
- Reunión Bilateral entre la República Dominicana y Puerto Rico (2015)
- Visita histórica de la Secretaria Adjunta de la Región Roberta Jacobson a Cuba
- Cumbre de las Américas – Panamá
- Visita del Secretario de Estado John Kerry a Cuba
- Visita histórica del Papa Francisco a Cuba
- Elecciones Presidenciales y Congresuales en Haití (2015)
- Juicio histórico al Ex Nuncio de la República Dominicana – Joseph Wesolowski
- Visita histórica del presidente de los Estados Unidos, Barack Obama, a Cuba.
