= Manuel Alejandro Grullón =

Dominican businessman (born 1953)

- Born: Manuel Alejandro Grullón Viñas; 9 May 1953 (age 73); Santiago de los Caballeros, Dominican Republic
- Education: (United States) NYU
- Organization: Banco Popular
- Spouse: Rosa Margarita Hernández Caamaño (m. 1984)
- Children: 3 children and 2 step-children
- Parent(s): Alejandro Enrique Grullón Espaillat (father); Ana Dínorah Viñas Messina (mother)
- Relatives: General Máximo Grullón Salcedo (second-great-grandfather); General Manuel Rodríguez Objío (second-great-grandfather); President Ulises Francisco Espaillat (third-great-grandfather); President Tomás Bobadilla (fourth-great-grandfather); Lieutenant-Governor Francisco Espaillat (fifth-great-grandfather) Arturo Grullón (great-granduncle) Juan Isidro Jimenes Grullón (second cousin-once removed); Ivonne Haza (second cousin-once removed); Marcos Bisonó (third cousin); Víctor Bisonó (third cousin); Antonio Espaillat (fourth cousin)

Manuel Alejandro Grullón Viñas (born 9 May 1953) is a businessman from the Dominican Republic. In April 2014, he was appointed the Chairman of Grupo Popular, a company whose subsidiaries include Banco Popular Dominicano, the largest private bank in the Dominican Republic. He has been president of the Banco Popular Dominicano since 1990. Forbes listed Grullón as one of the ten wealthiest men of the Dominican Republic.

== Biography ==
Grullón was born on 9 May 1953 in Santiago de los Caballeros to Alejandro Enrique Grullón Espaillat and Ana Dínorah Viñas Messina. His father was the founder of the Banco Popular Dominicano in August 1963, and held the position of President for 25 years. He attended the Carol Morgan School in Santo Domingo.

After completing his education in the United States, obtaining a degree in psychology from Tulane University and a master's degree in business administration from New York University, Grullón returned to his home country, becoming involved in his father's company.

=== Family ===
Grullón comes from a prominent family in the Dominican Republic.

Ancestors of Manuel Alejandro Grullón

16. Máximo Grullón Salcedo (1826–1878)
8. Servio Alejandro Grullón Julia (1860–1904; brother of Arturo Grullón)
17. Eleonora Julia Rodríguez (†1893; aunt of #21 and first cousin-once removed of #26)
4. Manuel Alejandro Grullón Rodríguez Objío (1895–1985)
18. Manuel Nemecio Rodríguez Objío (1838–1871)
9. María Luisa Mariana Rodríguez Objío Ravelo (1886–1920)
19. María del Rosario Ravelo Prados (1837–?)
2. Alejandro Enrique Grullón Espaillat (1929–2020)
20. Augusto Espaillat Espaillat (1849–1896; son of Ulises Espaillat and double great-grandson of Francisco Espaillat)
10. Enrique de Jesús Espaillat Julia (1877–1934)
21. Felicia Amalia Julia Julia (niece of #17)
5. Amantina Rafaela Espaillat González (1903–2006)
22. Ignacio María González Lavastida (1845–1886; nephew of Ignacio María González)
11. Ana Idalia González Nouel
23. Rosa Altagracia Nouel y Bobadilla (1857–1924; sister of Adolfo Alejandro Nouel y Bobadilla and granddaughter of Tomás Bobadilla)
1. Manuel Alejandro Grullón Viñas
24. Felipe Antonio Viñas Rodríguez (†1899)
12. Manuel de Jesús Viñas O’Donnell
25. Ana O’Donnell
6. Manuel de Jesús Viñas Rojas (1903–1981)
26. José Lino Rojas Guzmán (first cousin-once removed of #17)
13. Dolores Rojas Morales
27. María Cleofé Morales Linares
3. Ana Dínorah Viñas Messina (1929–2001)
14. Pedro Messina Galetti (1860–1955)
7. Italia Messina Pimentel (1914–1987; sister of Temístocles Messina Pimentel, former minister of Justice, minister of finance and commerce, deputy, ambassador to the UN, and member of the Permanent Court of Arbitration, The Hague)
15. Isabel Pimentel Hernández

Since 1984 Grullón is married to Rosa Margarita Hernández de Grullón (born 1953), who is ambassador of the Dominican Republic to France and Monaco since 2013.

== Professional life ==
Grullón began working for the Banco Popular Dominicano in 1981. He took over the position of President in 1990 when his father Alejandro Grullón was appointed Chairman of Grupo Popular's board of directors. In 2001 Alejandro Grullón became the parent company's chief executive.
