= Château de Masclat =

Castle in Masclat in the Lot département of France

Coordinates: 44°40′51″N 1°59′52″E

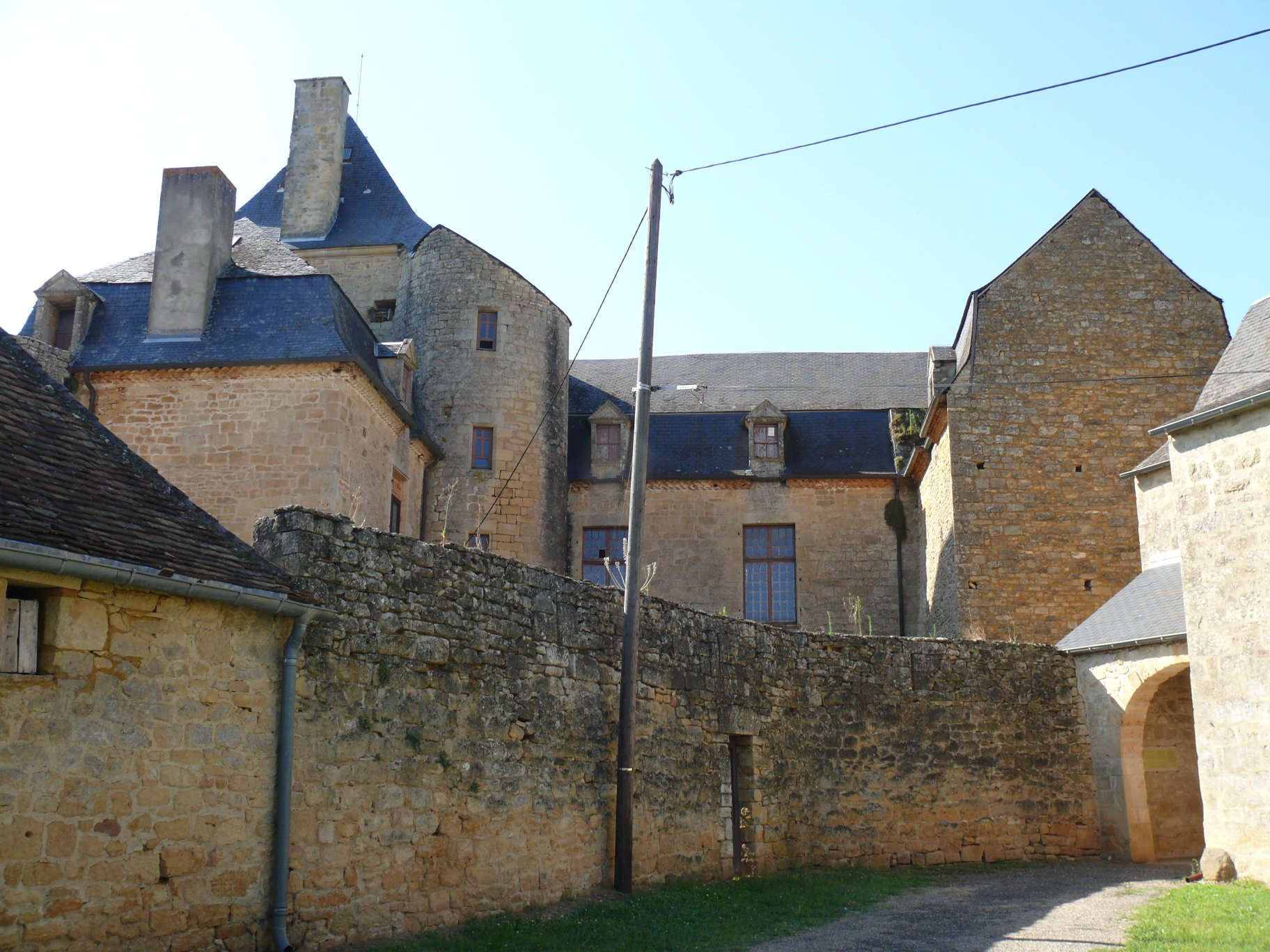
Facade of the castle of Masclat, Lot, France

The Château de Masclat is a castle in the commune of Masclat in the Lot département of France.

In the 13th century, the castle was held by the Cardaillac family. The edifice has a H-shaped plan, following various additions to the original central square tower. A second tower is discernible to the north, as well as traces of medieval openings. The cellar level, half underground, still has many remains from this period. In the 15th or 16th century, a tower with staircase was added to the corner. In the 18th and 19th centuries, the façades, the entrances and the interior arrangements were reorganised. Two dependant buildings line the cour d'honneur, one from the 17th century and the other from the 19th, built with stone brought from the former priory at Camilnel.

The Château de Masclat is privately owned and is not open to the public. It has been listed since 2007 as a monument historique by the French Ministry of Culture.

== See also ==
- List of castles in France
- Cardaillac family in French Wikipedia
