= Alejandro Bonilla =

Dominican painter (1820–1901)

- Born: November 17, 1820; Santo Domingo, Captaincy General of Santo Domingo
- Died: October 4, 1901 (aged 80); Dominican Republic
- Known for: Painting

Alejandro Bonilla Correa-Cruzado (1820–1901) was a Dominican painter and teacher, considered one of the fathers of the national Dominican pictorial tradition. A close friend to the founding fathers of Dominican independence, “La Trinitaria” (Juan Pablo Duarte, Matías Ramón Mella, and Francisco del Rosario Sánchez), he was the first to paint their portraits and one of the signatories of the Manifesto of January 16, 1844. The first important national painter and career, or professional, artist, Bonilla established a workshop in his home city and went on to become teacher to other prominent Dominican painters. His works were mostly of the realist, or romantic style. Art historian and critic Danilo de los Santos attributes Bonilla as the most perceptible and formal starting point of Dominican art.

He died on October 4, 1901. No photos or painted portraits of him have been found.

== Biography ==
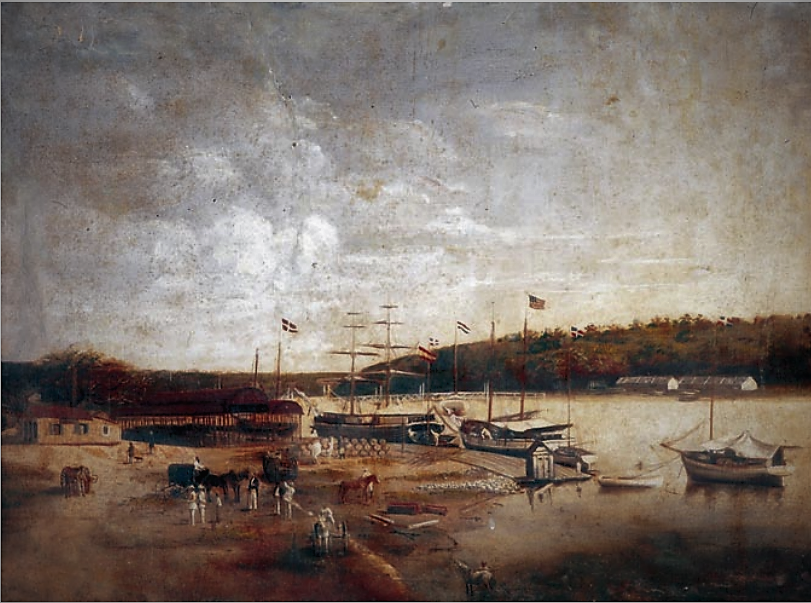
Puerto de Santo Domingo. Alejandro Bonilla. Finished in 1875

Born in Santo Domingo on November 17, 1820, Alejandro Bonilla Correa-Cruzado was the sixth of seven children to a Puerto Rican father, Juan Manuel Bonilla, and Dominican mother Maria Idelfonsa Correa-Cruzado, from Santo Domingo. A contemporary of Duarte, Bonilla began art lessons early in life in his hometown, likely receiving artistic guidance from native painters Domingo Echavarría, Leon Cordero or Epifanio Billini, or the foreign artist Alex De Brye, who resided in Santo Domingo in the late 1830s. Around this time, Bonilla, in his late teen years, traveled to Venezuela after the political situation in Dominican Republic intensified, living there throughout the 1840s while continuing art lessons.

At 29 years old, he married Luisa Marcano, and the two went on to have 6 children. He suffered ostracism during the period known as the "Six Years of Báez", resulting in his exile to Caracas in 1868, where he entered the workshop of an Italian painter specializing in portrait painting, learning under his guidance. In Caracas, he made his living off commissioned portraits and teaching; later, under the protection of Venezuelan President Falcón, who held him in high esteem, he established a painting school. It is unknown if the painter brought his children to live in the Venezuelan capital, which he eventually leaves to return to his native country in 1874 after six years of exile. Upon arriving in his hometown, Bonilla establishes a workshop in his home, which survives today as a historical landmark named "La Casa del Pintor" (The Painter's House). Portrait artist to many influential residents of the capital's society, he painted the first of two oil portraits of national hero Juan Pablo Duarte in 1887, produced from memory since Duarte was living in Venezuela at the time, in exile. This first painting was originally shipped to Venezuela, where Duarte's family lived. Bonilla's representations of Duarte were the basis for later paintings and sculptures by Luis Desangles (1861-1940) and Abelardo Rodríguez Urdaneta (1870-1933). Many of his other works are depictions of the country's urban spaces, and the environments of old towns in sentimental compositions.

== Gallery ==
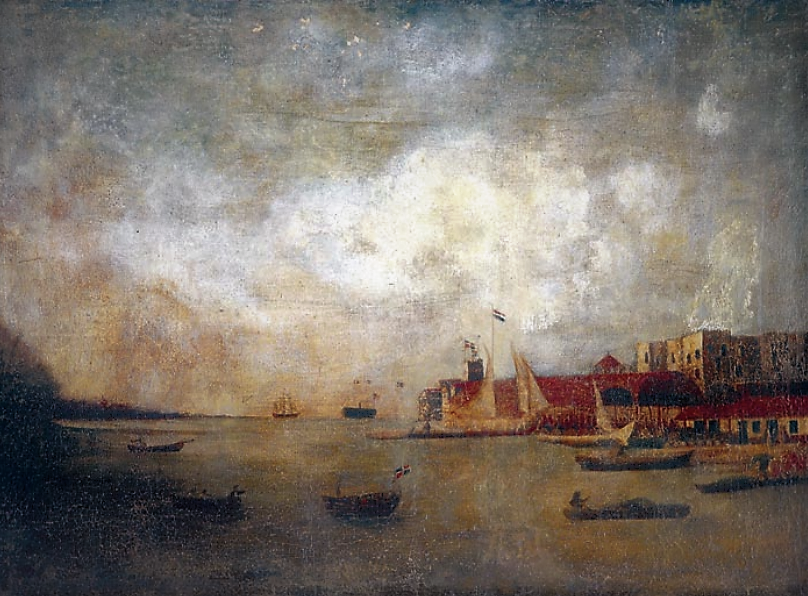
El Puerto sobre el Río Ozama. Alejandro Bonilla 1868

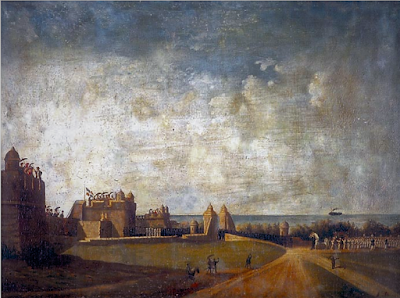
Fúnebre entierro de Sánchez

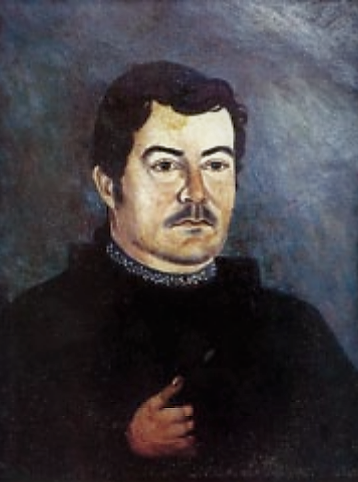
Portrait of Fernando Arturo de Meriño. Bonilla, without date

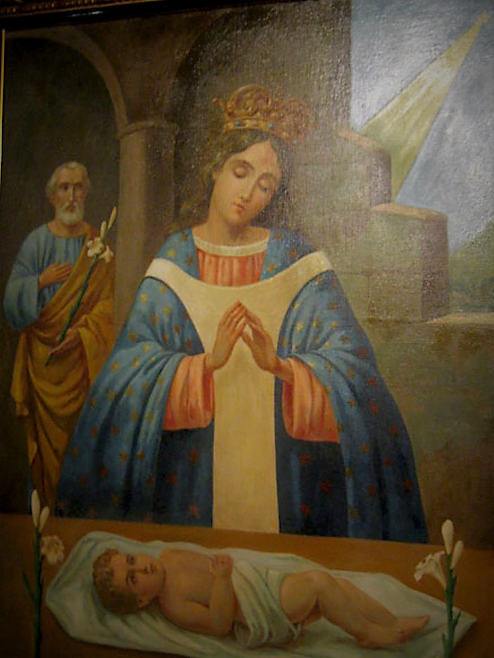
Virgen de Altagracia. Alejandro Bonilla. Finished in 1895

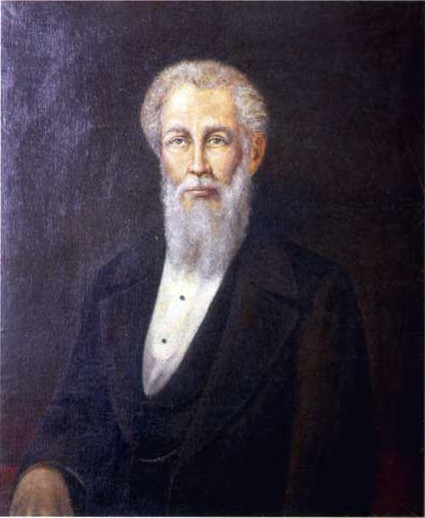
Retrato de Rafael de Marchena y de Solá. Alejandro Bonilla. Finished in 1890

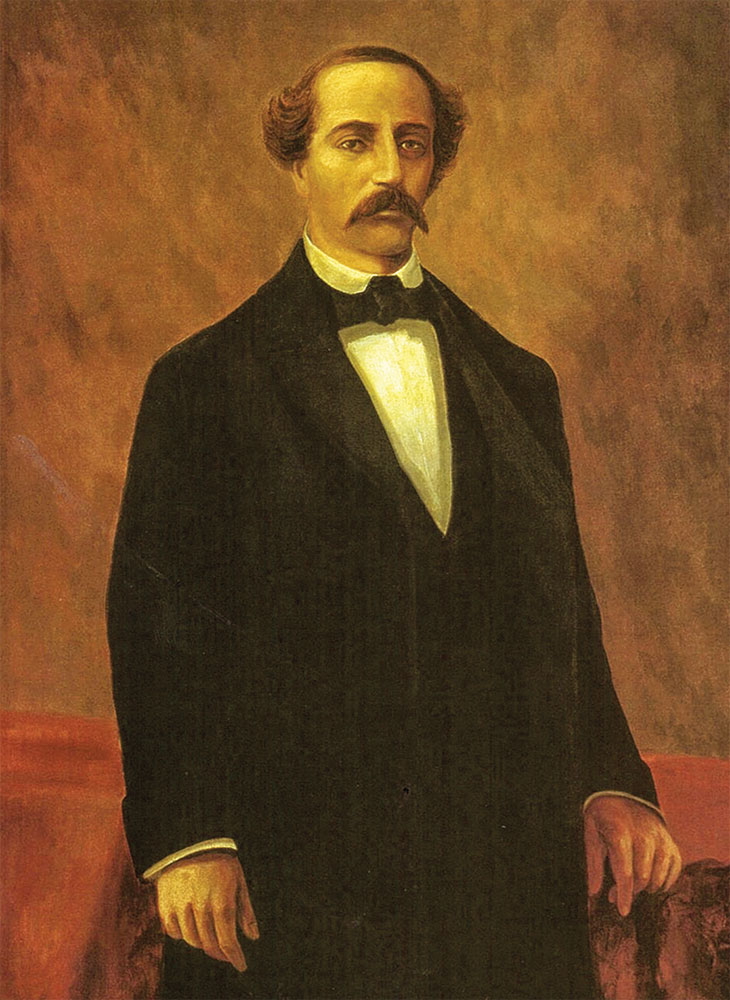
Juan Pablo Duarte. Alejandro Bonilla. Finished in 1887.
