= Arturo Grullón =

Dominican painter, ophthalmologist and educator (1869–1942)

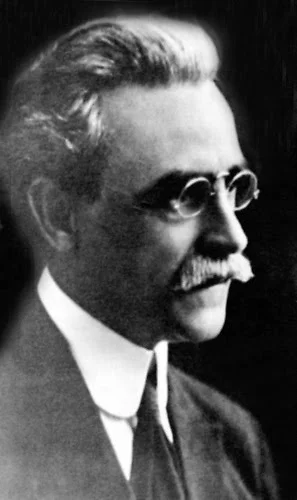
- Born: February 8, 1869; Santiago de los Caballeros, Dominican Republic
- Died: July 14, 1942 (aged 73); Santiago de los Caballeros, Dominican Republic
- Known for: Painting, Medicine
- Spouse: Filomena Amelia Grullón y Rodríguez-Objío
- Parents: General Máximo Grullón Salcedo (father); Eleonora Julia y Rodríguez (mother)
- Relatives: Juan Isidro Jimenes Grullón (grandnephew); Alejandro Grullón (grandnephew); Manuel Alejandro Grullón (great-grandnephew); Manuel Rodríguez Objío (grandfather-in-law)

Julio Arturo Grullón Julia (February 8, 1869 – July 14, 1942) was a Dominican painter, ophthalmologist, and educator. A student of influential Puerto Rican intellectual Eugenio María de Hostos, Grullón is considered one of the forerunners of Dominican national art, and remembered as one of the founders of Dominican surgery.

He was a part of the first graduating class of students from the Normal School in Santo Domingo in 1884, established by his professor de Hostos. Early in life, he was also a student of Spanish painter Juan Fernández Corredor and Dominican painter Luis Desangles, whose workshop brought him into the circle of other prominent young artists and intellectuals like Abelardo Rodríguez Urdaneta, Manuel María Sanabia, Arquímedes de la Concha, Leopoldo Navarro, Adolfo García Obregón, and Francisco González Lamarche. After graduating from the Normal school, Grullón travelled to Europe to study art, settling in Paris where he eventually earned his degree in medicine in 1902.

He returned to his hometown of Santiago de los Caballeros to practice his specialties in Surgery, Obstetrics and Ophthalmology, acquiring national recognition throughout the years. In addition, he provided his ophthalmological services in Santo Domingo, Puerto Plata, San Pedro de Macorís and San Francisco de Macorís. He was the first Dominican to practice cataract operations and surgeries.

Grullón married his niece Filomena Amelia Grullón, daughter of his brother Alejandro Servio Grullón with María Luisa Rodríguez-Objío, a daughter of National Hero Manuel Rodríguez Objío. Grullón was granduncle of banker Alejandro Grullón and great-granduncle of banker Manuel Alejandro Grullón.

Grullón died on July 14, 1942, in the same city where he was born. At present, the Children's Hospital of Santiago de los Caballeros bears his name.

== Biography ==
Julio Arturo Grullón Julia was born in Santiago de los Caballeros, Dominican Republic on February 8, 1869. His parents were independentist merchant and political activist, Máximo Grullón Salcedo (1826–1877) and Eleonora Julia, who provided their seven children a careful education allowing them to excel from an early age. One of them being Eliseo Grullón (1852–1915), who was sent to Nanter, France where he obtained a humanistic and professional training that afforded him influence in the political sphere of his native country when he returned in 1874; a recognized writer and initiator of cultural initiatives, the elder Grullón played a hand in Spanish painter Fernández Corredor's stay in Santo Domingo. Julio Arturo, Eliseo's younger brother learned under the artistic guidance of the aforementioned teacher and painter, who, in 1883, founded an academy of drawing and painting in the capital city, where Arturo Grullón attended classes.

Grullón was part of the first group of students who graduated on September 28, 1884, at the Normal School founded by de Hostos in 1880 in Santo Domingo, along with Félix Evaristo Mejía, another prominent student of the Antillean teacher. Grullón also attended Luis Desangles's workshop-school established in Santo Domingo in 1883.

At 17 years old, Grullón left for Europe to study visual arts. Initially destined for Rome, he instead settled in Paris, a powerful magnet for many Latin American intellectuals of the time. There he met Cuban writer José Martí, and learned pictorial techniques under a Spanish teacher, surrounded by the Paris of the Belle Epoque.

Despite initially travelling to Europe to continue an artistic career, motivated by anatomical drawing, he decides to study medicine in Paris, graduating as a doctor in 1902.

== Artistic career ==
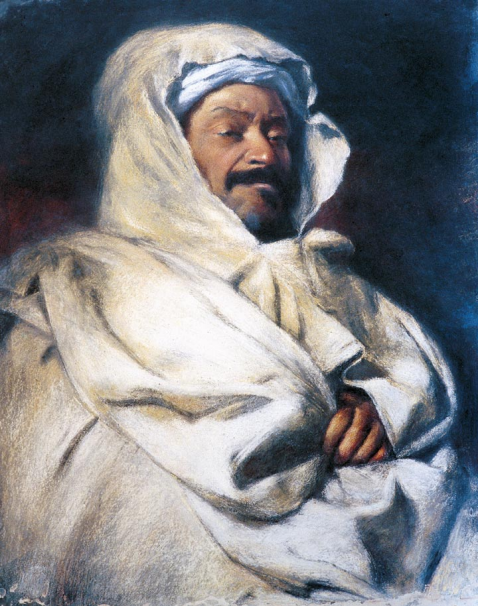
El Moro. Arturo Grullón. 1900

Grullón is one of the first Dominican artist to study art in Paris, where he was immersed in the fin-de-siècle era, participating in various national competitions; in 1900 he was awarded a prize in Paris for his famous pictorial work El Moro.

When excess study and work made him sick and a tropical climate was recommended, Grullón decided to go to Algiers, where against doctors’ recommendations, he enrolls in the university to continue his studies. It was there where he painted his series of Algerian pictorial life. He eventually returned to Paris in 1900. Of the entire series, the most prominent is El Moro (pastel 1896), a portrait also known by the title El Árabe. This 27 x 22 inch format painting was First Prize at the 1900 Paris Exposition.

The short and intense pictorial development of Grullón extends from the year 1883 with Corredor and Desangles, then in France, when he decided to study medicine in 1894, until the year 1900. After returning to his native country, he assumes the family and medical responsibilities that lead to the abandonment of the life of the workshop and canvas.” This renunciation of brushes is so abrupt that his autobiography as a health scientist makes no mention of his artistic incursions.

== Medical career ==
Surgery in the early 20th century Dominican Republic was limited to some emergency cases and war surgery, only involving immediate intervention of some wounds, due to hemorrhage, cleaning of bone trauma, and amputations; after graduating as a doctor in 1902 in Paris, Grullón returned to Santiago de los Caballeros, with specialties in Surgery, Obstetrics and Ophthalmology. He was granted an exequatur on January 10, 1903, the year in which he began his notable work as a surgeon. He performed operations on the eye, throat, pterygium, strabismus, cataract, tonsillectomy, and in 1906, Grullón performed the first gastroentero-anastomosis performed in the country.

In 1907, Grullón installed an operating room and two rooms for the sick in a unit of the Normal Pharmacy in Santiago. He was also the first surgeon in the Dominican Republic to perform prostate hypertrophy. In 1912 he was appointed director of the San Rafael hospital in the city of Santiago, and then again in 1921. He had been director of the San Pedro de Macorís Hospital, where he had also installed a private clinic. Grullón also directed the Military Hospital of Santo Domingo in 1914. Moreover, he was a professor at the University of Santo Domingo, in Gynecology and Topographic Anatomy.

== Gallery ==
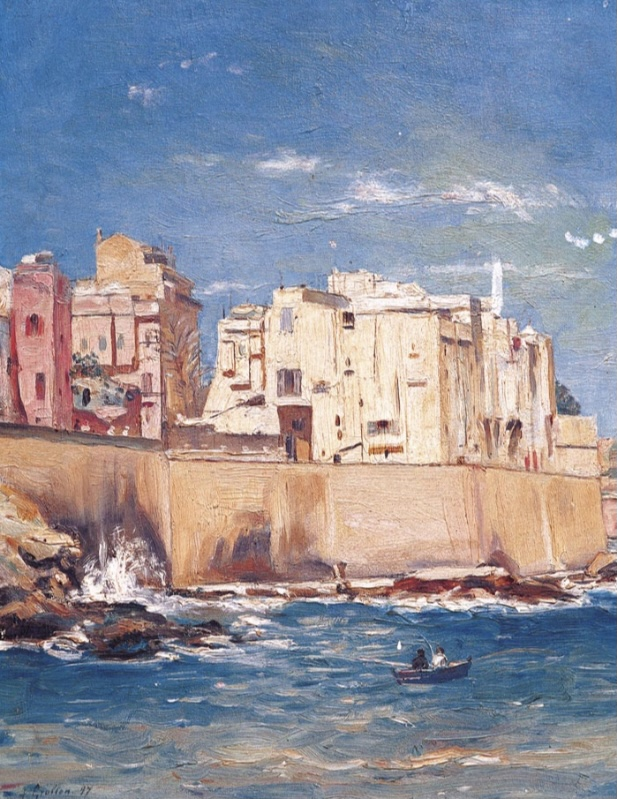
Paisaje argelino. Arturo Grullon 1897.

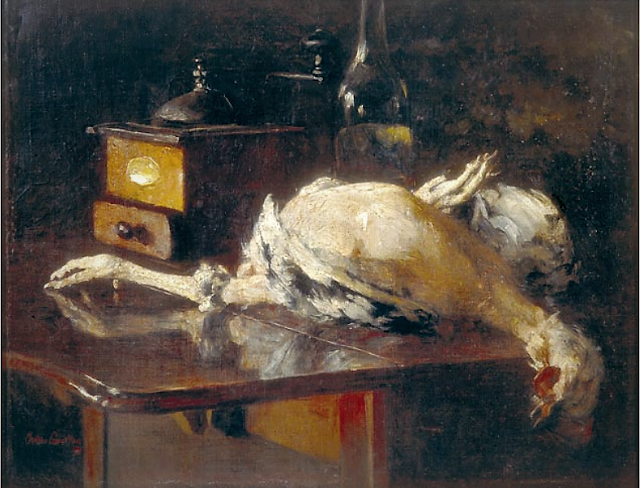
Arturo Grullon – Still life with bird, 1898

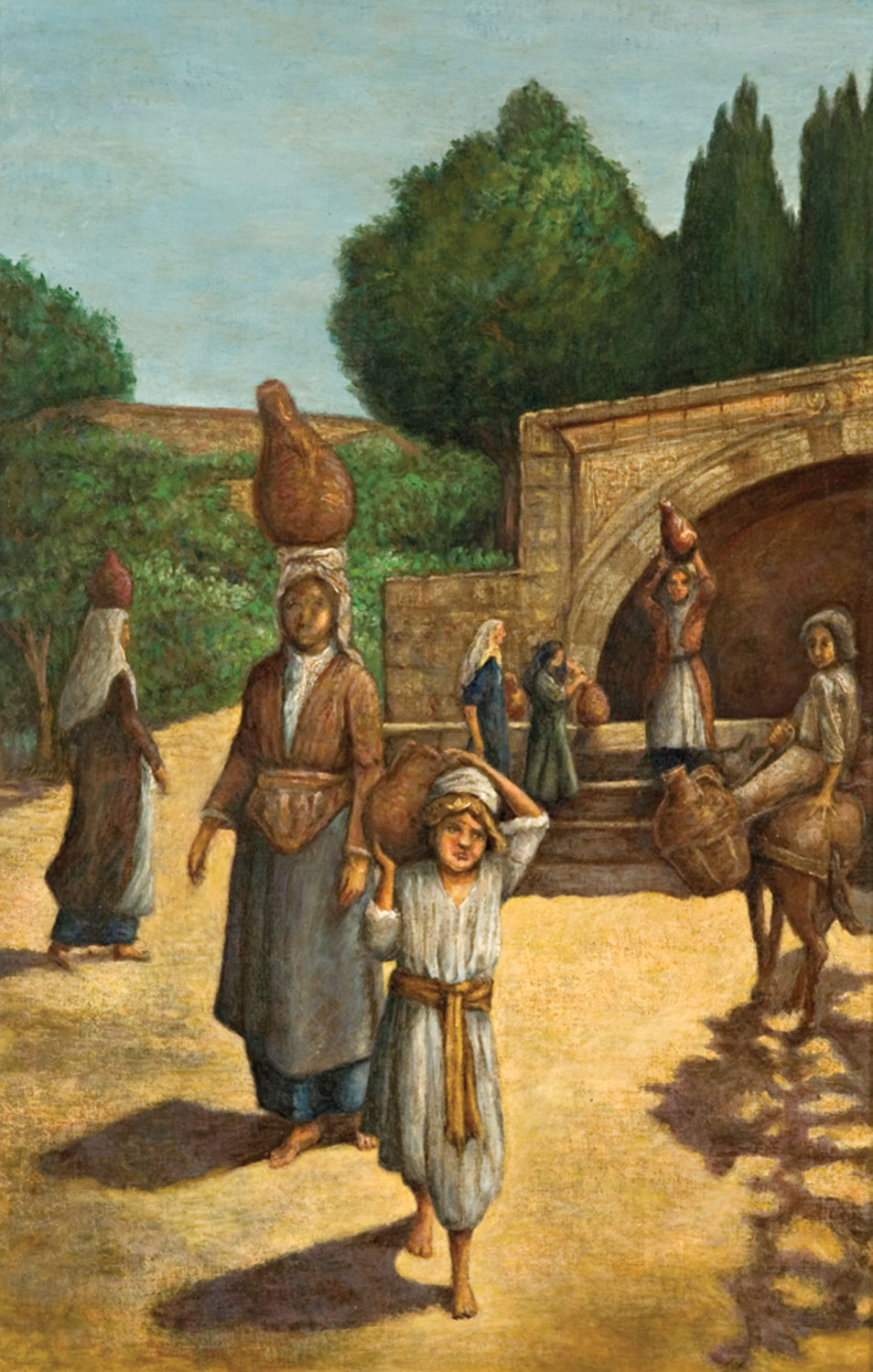
Arturo Grullon – Water from the fountain

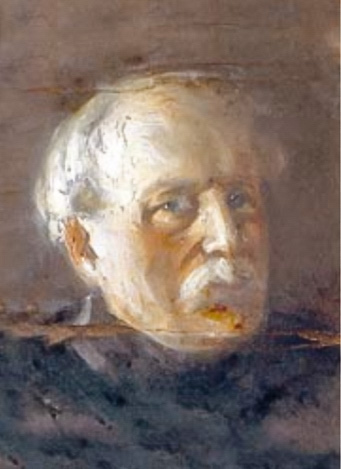
Grullon Retrato de Monsieur

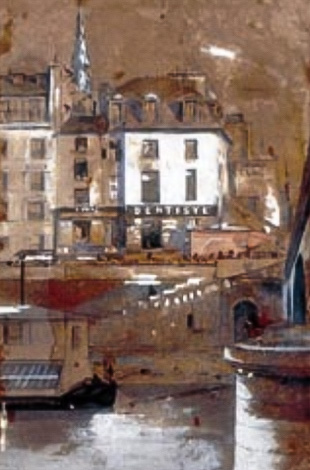
Grullón, Paisaje Urbano
