= Banco Popular Dominicano =

Dominican bank

Banco Popular Dominicano, S.A. - Banco Múltiple

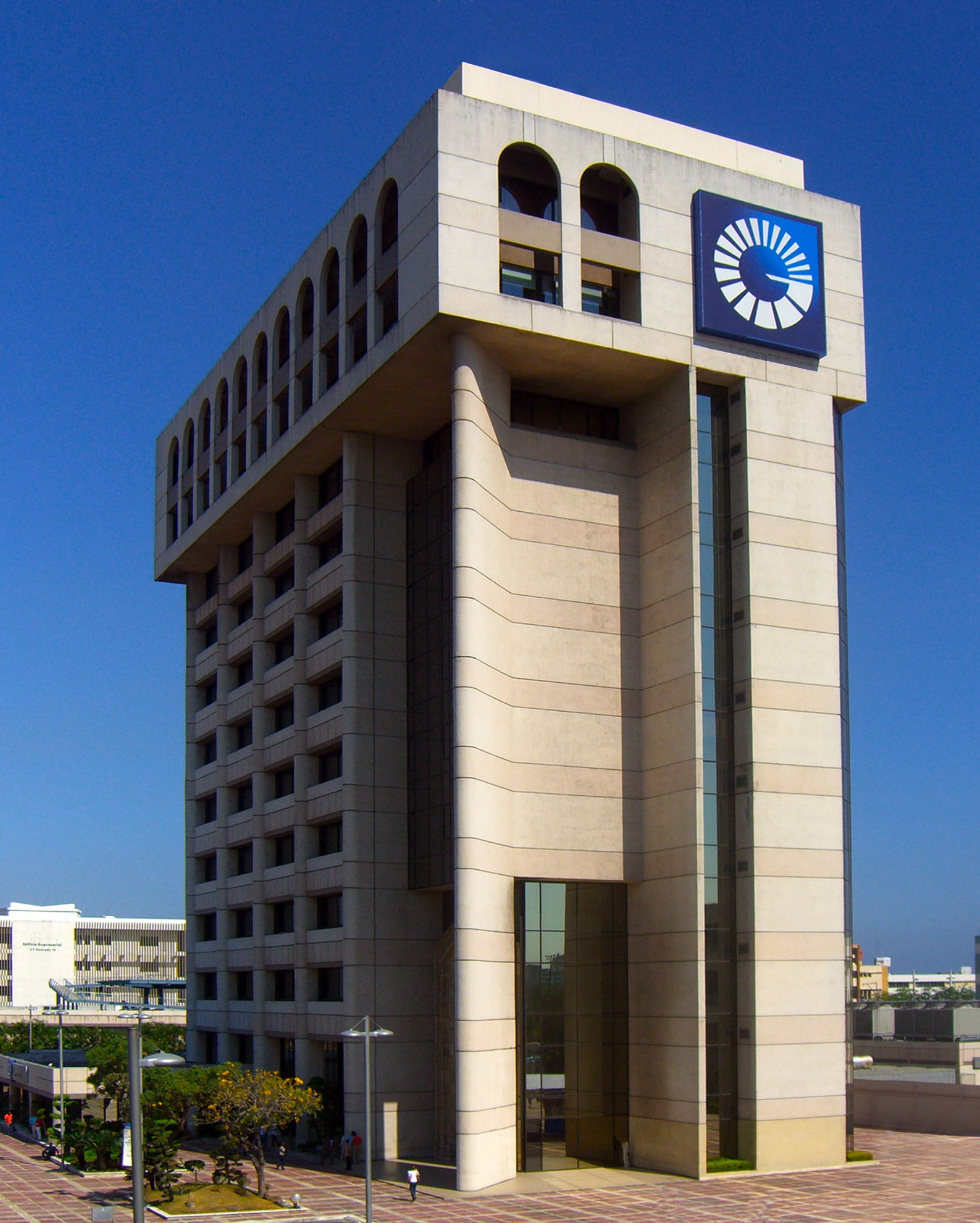
- Banco Popular HQ, "Torre Popular" in 2006
- Trade name: Banco Popular Dominicano (BPD)
- Native name: Banco Popular Dominicano, S.A. - Banco Múltiple
- Type: Subsidiary of Grupo Popular
- Industry: Financial services
- Founded: 1963; 63 years ago
- Founder: Alejandro Grullón
- Headquarters: 18.481369°N 69.912991°W; Avenida John F. Kennedy 20, Miraflores, Santo Domingo, Distrito Nacional, 10203, Dominican Republic
- Number of locations: 192 branches (August 2025); 1,312 ATMs (August 2025)
- Area served: Dominican Republic
- Key people: Christopher Paniagua (Executive President)
- Products: Retail banking; Commercial banking; Credit cards; Savings account; Mortgages; Checking; Debit cards
- Total assets: ▲RD$876,933.18 million (≈ US$13.92 billion) (August 2025)
- Number of employees: ~8,162 (August 2025)
- Parent: Grupo Popular
- Website: popularenlinea.com (in Spanish)

Banco Popular Dominicano, S.A. - Banco Múltiple, trading as Banco Popular Dominicano (BPD), is a bank providing retail and commercial banking services; it was the largest lender in the Dominican Republic until 2023, when it was narrowly overtaken by Banreservas. It is a wholly-owned subsidiary of the financial conglomerate Grupo Popular, S.A. The company, which is known in the Dominican Republic as Banco Popular, has over 6,800 employees, three million customers, a credit portfolio of 3.7 million dollars, and 6.1 million dollars in assets as of 2014. It was chosen in 2021 by Global Finance magazine as the best private banking company in the Dominican Republic, and the financial magazine The Banker included Banco Popular in its list of 1,000 best banks in the world, placing it in the 739th spot in 2023. The bank's current chairman is Christopher Paniagua.

== History ==
Banco Popular's parent company, Grupo Popular, S.A., was founded in Panama in 1963, by Dominican banker Alejandro Grullón. It was then constituted under the laws of the Dominican Republic the following year. Alejandro Grullón served as chairman of the parent company during its first 25 years.

In 1990, Grullon's son, Manuel Alejandro Grullón, was elected chairman of Banco Popular, and in 2001 he also became the executive president of the Bank's parent company Grupo Popular. Forbes has placed Manuel Alejandro Grullón on its list of richest Dominicans.

In 1998, Banco Popular Dominicano founded a television channel, CDN 37.

On September 3, 2019, Banco Popular Dominicano became a signatory of the United Nations Environment Programme Finance Initiative.

== Competitors ==
As of 2024, the bank's main competitors in the Dominican Republic include Banreservas, BHD Bank, Scotiabank Dominican Republic, and Banco Santa Cruz.

== See also ==
- List of banks in the Dominican Republic
