= Leopoldo Navarro (painter) =

Dominican painter, educator, mathematician, and sculptor (1862–1908)

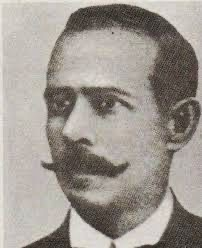
- Born: Leopoldo Navarro; 1862; Santo Domingo, Dominican Republic
- Died: July 12, 1908 (aged 45–46); Santo Domingo, Dominican Republic
- Occupations: painter, sculptor, educator, mathematician, writer

Leopoldo Navarro (1862 – July 12, 1908) was a Dominican Republic painter, educator, mathematician, and sculptor born in Santo Domingo in 1862. An impressionistic romantic, he is considered one of the forerunners of national Dominican plastic arts, as well as a notable educator.

He died on July 12, 1908, in Santo Domingo, at the age of 46. In the Museum Bellapart, a collection of Navarro's watercolors are displayed. An important street in Santo Domingo is also named after him.

== Biography ==
Navarro was born in 1862 in Santo Domingo The son of a Dominican mother and Spanish father, at seven years old he became an orphan and entered in San Luis Gonzaga School, founded by the religious philanthropist Priest Francisco Xavier Billini, who became his guardian and mentor. He graduated from high school very young, soon entering the teaching career; known as an influential teacher, he had exceptional pedagogical gifts in both science and humanities, teaching in both branches and serving in leadership roles at the same school he was educated.

Navarro also demonstrated a talent in drawing and painting, which led him to the workshop of Dominican painter Luis Desangles, where he established artistic relationships with fellow students and future painters Abelardo Rodríguez Urdaneta, Arturo Grullón, and Adolfo García Obregón, among others. The young Navarro participated in the pioneering Art Salon of 1890, organized by the Friends of the Country Society, exhibiting an oil landscape. Throughout the last decade of the 19th century, Navarro's activism revolved around developments in teaching and art; upon the death of his mentor, Father Billini (1896), he immersed himself fully in the San Luis Gonzaga School, of which he was a full professor of various practical and theoretical subjects, also participating as newspaper editor of the campus paper, El Colegial (1895). He had already joined the Friends of the Country Society (1894) and had established his Academy of Drawing and Painting (1893), assuming chairs at the Professional Institute and, simultaneously, in the Directorate of the Normal School. Collaborator of Puerto Rican educator and philosopher Eugenio de Hostos, Navarro was directorate of the Normal School, established in 1880, until the school closed.

In 1884, Navarro married Altagracia González, with whom he had two daughters: Mercedes Artémida (b. 1885) and Clorinda Altagracia (b. 1888), however the young wife died in the year of the latter's birth. Navarro remarried a few years later with América González in 1891, with whom he had a third daughter named Julieta, and a boy named Raúl Navarro González.

In 1896, at the age 35, he travelled to Spain, where he took the time to concentrate on his pictorial activity, consequently residing in Europe for ten years. In Madrid, Navarro devoted himself to drawing, copying numerous works and studying “with enthusiastic ardor the paintings of the great Velázquez and the great Goya, being captivated (...) by the surprising realism of the first and the magic of the color of the second.” He lived in Paris and Madrid, painting a large number of oil paintings, though Navarro is best known for his series of watercolor portraits, a difficult technique to use, painted while living in Madrid.

When he returned to Dominican Republic, Navarro dedicated himself more to magisterial and public service than art. He accepted to be director of the Statistical Office, a position in which he immersed himself from 1906, planning the procedures to carry out a National Census. He was in these matters when he unexpectedly died in 1908, at the age of 47.

== Gallery ==
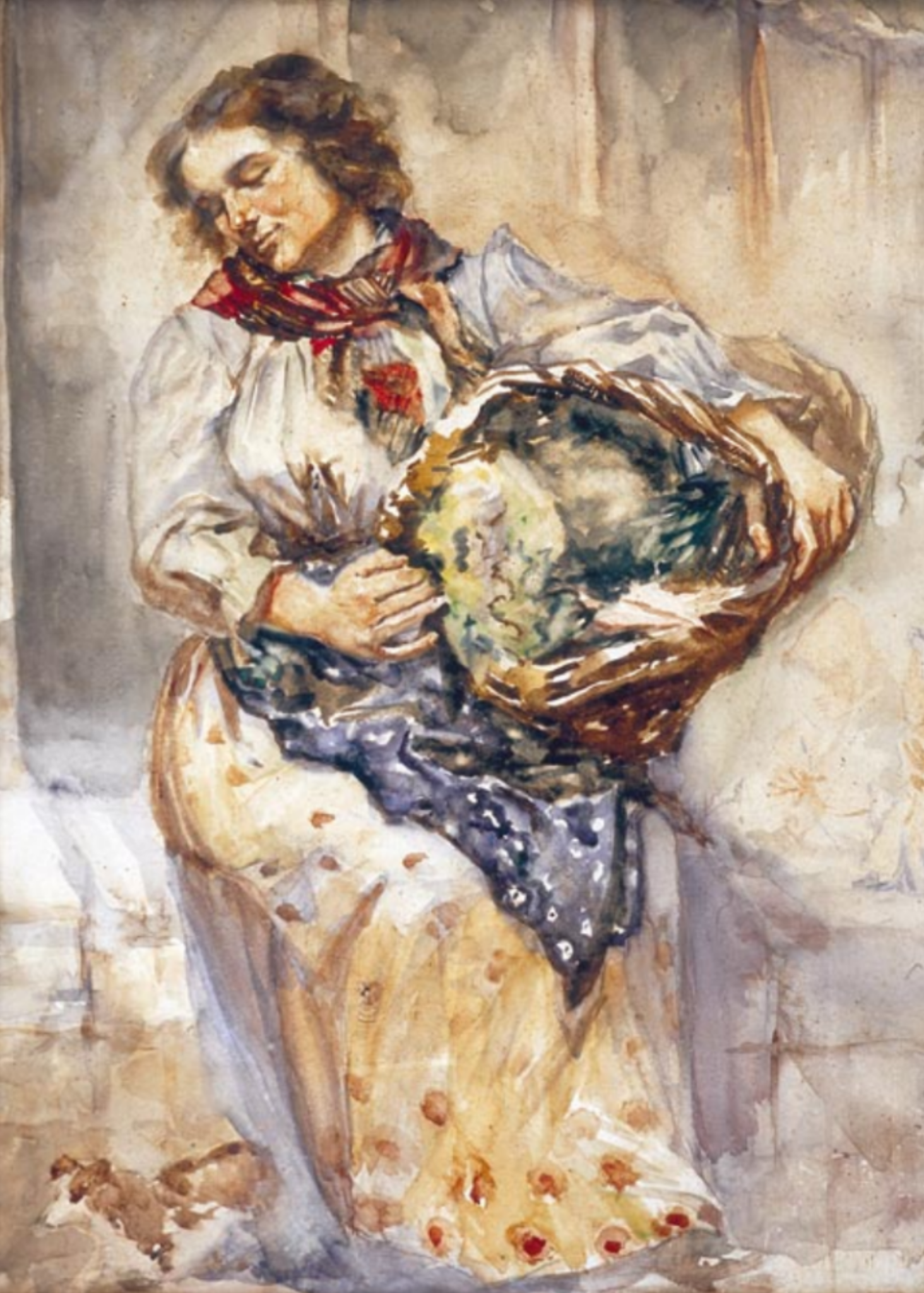
Canastera. 1900

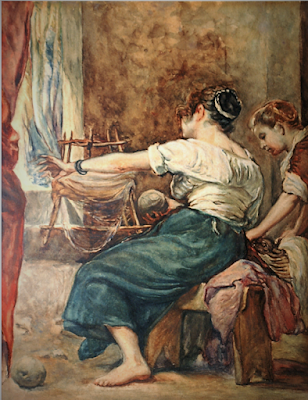
Leopoldo Navarro The Spinners. 1900
