= Alejandro Grullón =

Dominican banker (1929–2020)

Alejandro Enrique Grullón Espaillat (Santiago de los Caballeros, 3 April 1929 – Casa de Campo, La Romana, 15 December 2020) was a banker and businessman from the Dominican Republic.

== Biography ==
Grullón Espaillat was born to Manuel Alejandro Grullón Rodríguez-Objío (1895–1985) and Amantina Rafaela Espaillat González (1903–2006). He married Ana Dínorah Viñas Messina (1929–2001) in 1952, and later after he divorced, then he married Melba Segura Castillo (born 1956). He was grandnephew of Arturo Grullón and second cousin of Juan Isidro Jimenes Grullón.

He founded Banco Popular Dominicano in January 1964, today the largest private bank in the Dominican Republic. He was the chairman of the Board of Directors of Grupo Popular until April 2014, when he left his post to his son Manuel Alejandro Grullón (1953–). He was also co-founder of the NGO Fundación Sur Futuro.

== Ancestry ==
Ancestors of Alejandro Grullón

16. Manuel Ramón Grullón Grullón (†1871)
8. Máximo Grullón Salcedo (1826–1878)
17. Eustaquia Filomena Salcedo Gómez (1812–1834)
4. Servio Alejandro Grullón Julia (1860–1904)
18. Nicolás Francisco Julia Blanch (also father of #27)
9. Eleonora Julia Rodríguez (†1893; sister of #27)
19. Tomasina Rodríguez de Rojas (also mother of #27; aunt of #25; cousin of Benigno Filomeno de Rojas)
2. Manuel Alejandro Grullón Rodríguez-Objío (1895–1985)
20. Manuel de Jesús Rodríguez
10. Manuel Nemesio Rodríguez Objío (1838–1871)
21. Bernardina Objío Noble (1814–1893)
5. Mariana Rodríguez-Objío Ravelo (1886–1920)
22. Agustín Ravelo Hernández (1783–1872)
11. Mª del Rosario Ravelo Prados (1838–?)
23. Juana Prados Peláez (1800–1879)
1. Alejandro Enrique Grullón Espaillat (1929–2020)
24. Ulises Francisco Espaillat Quiñones (cousin of #25; grandson of Francisco Espaillat)
12. Augusto Espaillat Espaillat (1849–1896)
25. Eloísa Espaillat Rodríguez (niece of #19; cousin of #24 and #27; granddaughter of Francisco Espaillat; uterine sister of Juan Antonio Alix)
6. Enrique de Jesús Espaillat Julia (1877–1934)
26. Juan Julia Ruiz (1818–1895)
13. Felicia Amalia Julia Julia
27. Rosa Virginia Julia Rodríguez (daughter of #18 and #19; sister of #9; cousin of #25)
3. Amantina Rafaela Espaillat González (1903–2006)
28. José Gregorio González Santín (1819–1870; brother of Ignacio Mª González Santín)
14. Ignacio María González Lavastida (1845–1886)
29. Ana Teresa Lavastida y Fernández de Palomares (sister of Miguel Antonio Lavastida y Fernández de Palomares, Foreign Minister)
7. Ana Idalia González Nouel (1878–1970)
30. Carlos Rafael Nouel y Pierret (1803–1905; father of Adolfo Alejandro Nouel y Bobadilla)
15. Rosa Altagracia Nouel y Bobadilla (1857–1924; sister of Adolfo Alejandro Nouel y Bobadilla)
31. Clemencia Antonia Bobadilla y Desmier D’Olbreuse (1835–1876; daughter of Tomás Bobadilla y Briones; mother of Adolfo Alejandro Nouel y Bobadilla)
