= Luis Desangles =

Dominican artist and educator (1861–1940)

Luis Desangles Lubiles
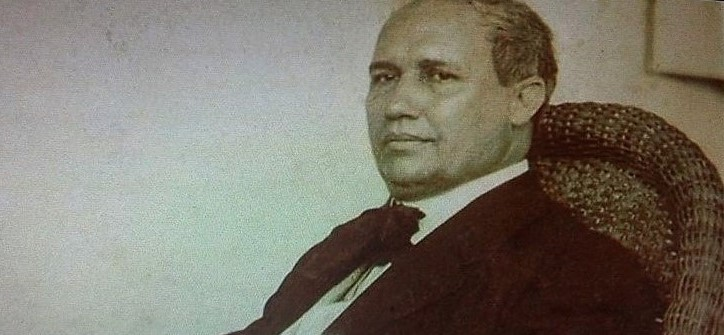
- Born: Luis Desangles Lubiles; 8 February 1861; Santo Domingo, Dominican Republic
- Died: 13 April 1940 (aged 79); Santiago de Cuba, Cuba
- Occupations: painter, educator, sculptor
- Spouse: Altagracia Vallejo
- Children: 7

Luis Desangles Lubiles (8 February 1861 – 13 April 1940) was a Dominican painter, sculptor, and educator born in Santo Domingo, Dominican Republic. Instructor to many of the great native artists of the era, Desangles is remembered as one of the forerunners of Dominican national art and initiators of the country's costumbrismo style.

His artistic subjects range from portraits, pictorial daily life, religious iconography, historical depictions, naturalist landscapes, and still life. Many of his portraits are of influential political figures, such as Juan Pablo Duarte, Buenaventura Báez Méndez, Matías Ramón Mella, Francisco del Rosario Sánchez, Gregorio Luperón, Ulises Francisco Espaillat, and Eugenio María de Hostos. He is also credited for painting many religious paintings and murals in cathedrals throughout Cuba, such as in Santiago de Cuba Cathedral and the Cathedral of San Salvador in Bayamo.

In 1893, dictator Ulises Hereaux deemed Desangles a conspirator and exiled him from the country after his students painted public works of the leader hanged. His travels after exile led him to Puerto Rico, New York City, and Cuba. Some of the most recognizable names that studied under Desangles include Abelardo Rodríguez Urdaneta, Ramón Frade, Arturo Grullón, Leopoldo Navarro, Adolfo García Obregón, Manuel María Sanabia, Arquímedes de la Concha, Carlos Ramírez Guerra, and Francisco González Lamarche.

In 1912, he was appointed director of the Municipal Academy of Fine Arts in San Cristóbal and in 1935 he became Head of the Provincial School of Painting in Santiago de Cuba. In 1940, Desangles died due to complications from diabetes at the age of 79. In October 2018, a major retrospective of his work was presented at the Museo Bellapart in Santo Domingo.

== Early life ==
Luis Desangles was born in Santo Domingo to Juan Pedro Desangles, a native of the Pyrenees region in France living in the country since the 1830s and Teresa Sibilly, a native of Curaçao, with whom he had four children: Epifanio (1858), Luis (1861), Pedro Nicolás (1863) and María Ana (1865). Desangles was born in the same year in which Dominican conservatives annexed the country to Spain. As a child he showed a fondness for painting which his father encouraged, enrolling him in art classes with Leon Cordero, a Spanish painter living in the country, from 1870-1874, until Cordero died in 1874.

He married Altagracia Vallejo in 1882, who modeled for several portraits, and together they would go on to have seven children: Constancia Mercedes (b. 1883), María Luisa (b. 1885), Juan Pedro (b. 1886), María Altagracia (b. 1888), Ana Teresa (b. 1889), Luis Rafael (b. 1890) and Julio Alfredo (b. 1893). Those who treated Luis Desangles familiarly called him Sisito.

In 1883 he opened an art workshop in Santo Domingo, Casa-Taller, on Padre Billini street, where he instructed many of the great names that go on to define the early era of art in the country. In short time, Desangles’s workshop became a cultural epicenter of the city where intellectuals like Eugenio María de Hostos, Francisco Henríquez y Carvajal, Américo Lugo, José Rufino Reyes, and Emilio Prud'Homme gathered. His house-workshop became an environment of learning and bohemian artistic encounters. Artists and intellectuals often met there.

Desangles worked as a teacher of various disciplines: in addition to teaching art, he gave musical instruction as a musician with command of various instruments; he established a gymnasium where he taught exercise classes; and he’s remembered as one of the first collectors of pre-Hispanic objects, colonial antiquities and works of art of his time.

== Exile ==
In 1893, some students of Desangles who were strongly opposed to Heureaux conceived of making several paintings depicting the dictator hanged. The paintings were made and sprang up in different public places. Heureaux’s investigation eventually led him to the well-founded suspicion that the paintings came from the workshop of Desangles, which produced immediate consequences. The first was the expatriation of Desangles, who was given 24 hours to leave the Republic. The second consequence was the closure of the painter's studio-school, of the home space as a place for cultural gatherings, and the closure of the Municipal School that he directed. The third consequence was the planned execution of Arquímedes de la Concha, who was later sparred. The general archive of the nation houses the official act by which the dictator expels him from the country as a “conspirator”. Desangles goes into exile in Ponce, Puerto Rico, where he participates in the exhibition of the Fourth Centennial of the Discovery of the Island. He obtains the first prize with Caonabo.

Desangles traveled to the United States as well, where he made the acquaintance of José Martí. He returned to his native country in 1904, but was there only briefly before being appointed Consul for Santiago de Cuba by President Carlos Morales.

== Cuba ==
Desangles had his most prolific artistic production in Cuba. He carries out notable works such as the Mural of the Cathedral of San Salvador, in the Province of Bayamo, and ten paintings of biblical matters, located in the same ecclesiastical enclosure. The cathedral mural is titled The Oath of the Flag, measuring 850 × 450 cm. It was commissioned in 1918 by the Archbishop of Santiago de Cuba, Monsignor Félix Ambrosio Guerra y Guerra, to be placed inside the main parish of Bayamo.

He would live in Cuba for the rest of his life and it became his second homeland. In 1912, he was appointed Director of the "Escuela Superior de Varones de San Cristóbal" (a boys' school) and later taught at the Academia Municipal de Bellas Artes. In 1935, he was appointed Honorary Director of the Escuela Provincial de Artes Plásticas de Santiago de Cuba (now the Escuela Provincial de Artes Plásticas José Joaquín Tejada).

== Gallery ==
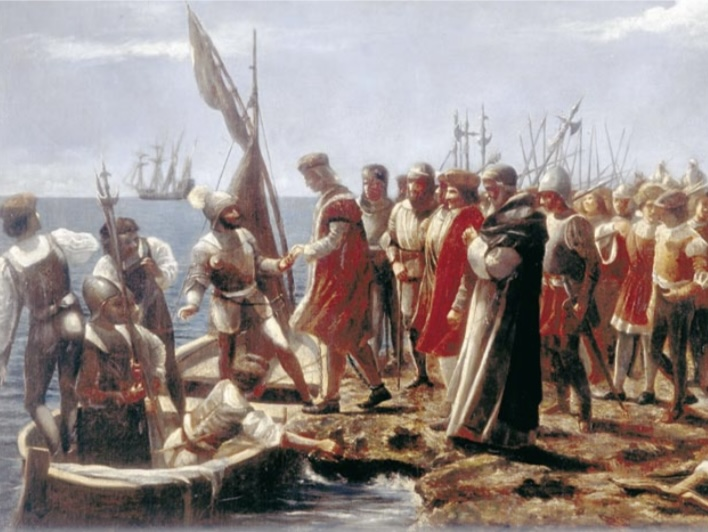
Colon engrillado. Luis Desangles without date.

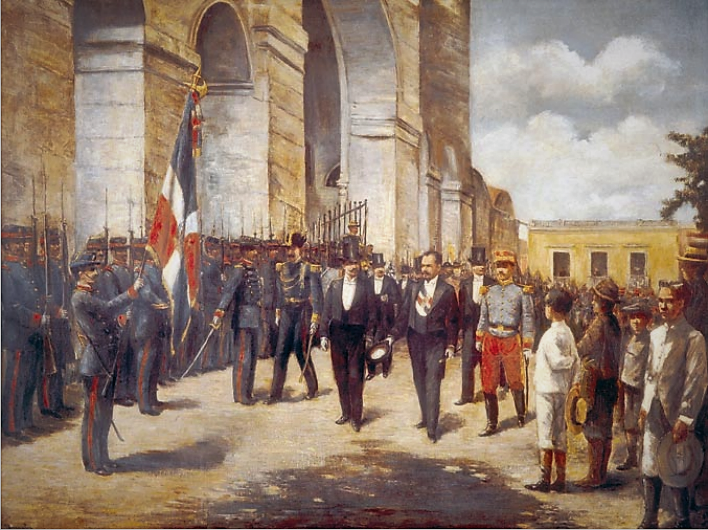
Desangles-Woss

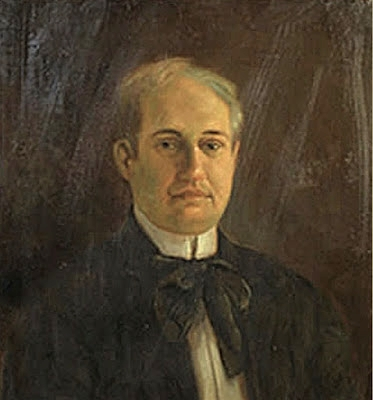
Self-portrait (1900)

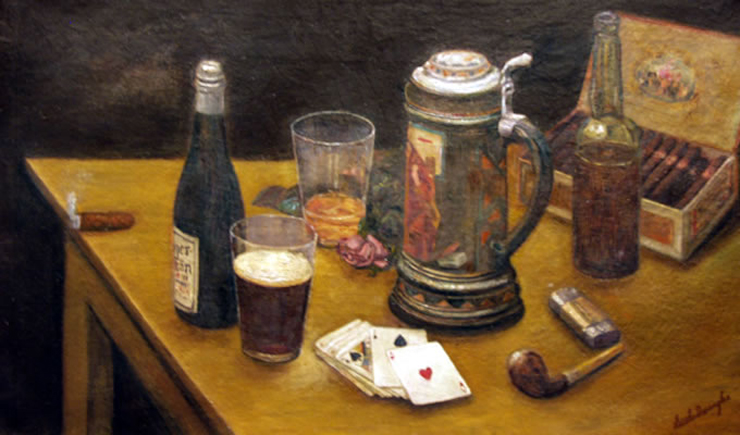
Luis Desangles. Naturaleza Muerta. Date unknown

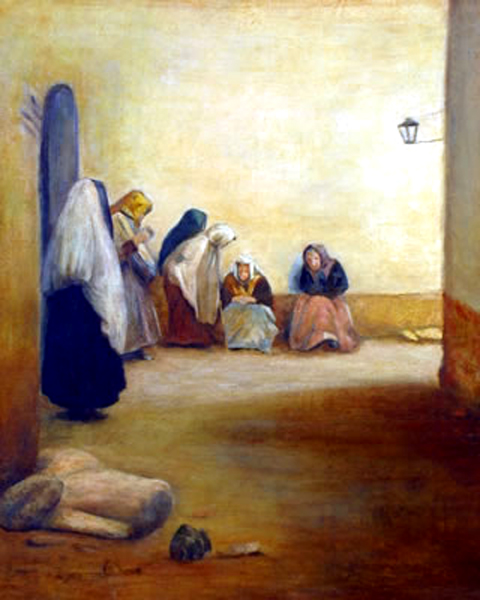
Luis Desangles. Lad Mendigas. Date unknown

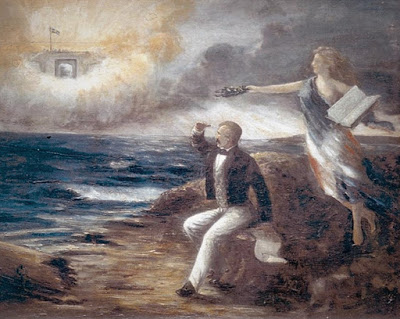
Juan Pablo Duarte Contemplating the Birth of the Republic
