= Abelardo Rodríguez Urdaneta =

Dominican sculptor, photographer and painter

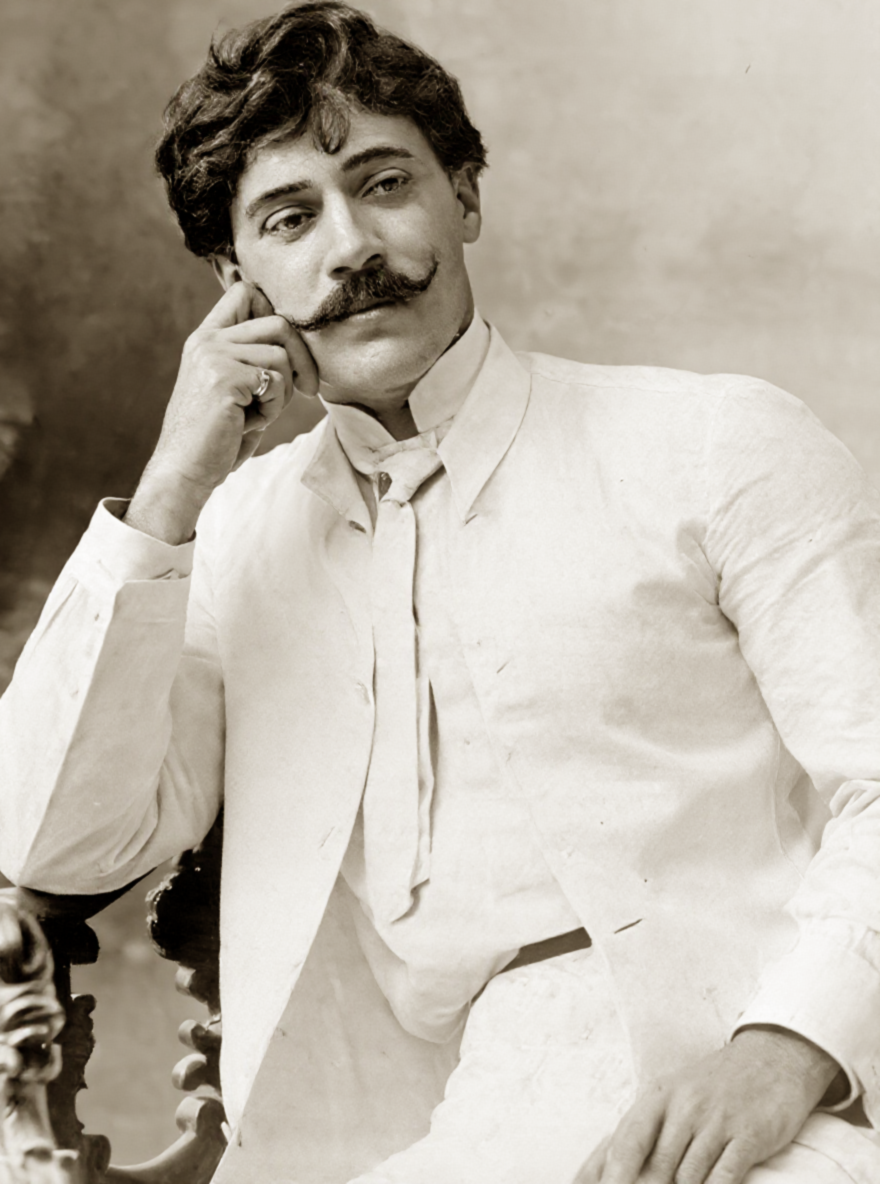
- Urdaneta, c. 1910
- Born: Abelardo Rodríguez Urdaneta; June 24, 1870; Santo Domingo, Dominican Republic
- Died: January 11, 1933 (aged 62); Dominican Republic
- Occupations: Sculptor, painter, photographer, educator

Abelardo Rodríguez Urdaneta (June 24, 1870 – January 11, 1933) was a Dominican sculptor, photographer, painter and educator. A prolific artist, he was one of the first successful multidisciplinary artists of the modern art era in the Dominican Republic and is considered to be one of the forerunners of Dominican sculpture, photography, and painting. His creative work consists of a large number of portraits, busts, statues, monuments and pictorial paintings in which he collected important moments in the country's history that reflected the lives of social leaders, merchants, and families of the time.

In 1908, Urdaneta opened an academy of drawing,painting, and sculpture that trained many prominent artists, including Celeste Woss y Gil, Delia Weber, Genoveva Báez, Aida Ibarra and Fernando 'Tuto' Báez. He kept his academy active until 1933, the year of his death.

Many of his works are currently conserved in the Museum of Modern Art and Museo Bellapart in Santo Domingo. In the Autonomous University of Santo Domingo, his statue, "Caonabo,” stands. Two reproductions made in Italy of this work are in the Mirador Park and in Santiago. One of the streets in the Gascue neighborhood bears his name and the house where he was born became a museum that preserves archives, photos, paintings, and chronicles. In honor of his work, the Rodríguez Urdaneta Photography Contest, created in April 1981, and the Abelardo Rodríguez Urdaneta FUNGLODE Photography Contest, created in 2007, are named after him.

== Biography ==
Urdaneta was born in Santo Domingo on June 24, 1870, to parents Isabel Rodríguez Urdaneta, of Venezuelan descent, and doctor Manuel Guerrero Peña, who had a fondness for the violin and painting. He had two sisters, Eloísa and Rosalía. At the age of 13, he was enrolled in the workshop of Juan Fernández Corridor, a Spanish painter who opened an academy in Santo Domingo from 1883 to 1886. Later he enrolled under the tutelage of Dominican painter Luis Desangles, considered one of the first master painters of the country, later participating in the First National Art Show (1890), in which he exhibited together with his teachers and with fellow disciples Arturo Grullón, Leopoldo Navarro, and among others. He later learned the artistic fundamentals of photography as a pupil of Julio Pou, a Dominican photographer, and Spaniard Francisco Adrover. In 1894 he began working as a freelance professional photographer, shortly becoming one of the most socially demanded national photographers of the time.

Urdaneta married Graciela Núñez, with whom he had 5 children: Elena, Rafael, Abelardito, José, Angel, and a child who died very young. His reputation as a handsome artistic gentleman led to extramarital love affairs that resulted in even more descendants. He became depressed following the loss of artistic works caused by hurricane San Zenón (1930). On his deathbed, next to him was only the Aragonese Esther Laclaustro Dorse, his last lover, who lived with him for 25 years (1908–1933), since almost all of his children lived abroad, as well as Graciela Núñez, the official widow who died in New York in 1939.

== Artistic career ==
Urdaneta was known as one of the preeminent photographers of the country, going on to photograph many influential socialites of the time. In 1898, his photo of Arturo Pellerano Alfau was published, considered to be the first photograph published in a Dominican magazine. Since 1901, his photographic studio has been somewhat of a cultural center in Santo Domingo, visited by many prominent personalities, from politicians to artists including José Martí, Eugenio de Hostos, and Delia Weber.

In 1890, Abelardo completed his oil portrait of Juan Pablo Duarte. The image, inspired in great part by the earlier works of Alejandro Bonilla (1820–1901), is today the most recognized and admired reproduction of the founding father. In general, Urdaneta's portrait and pictorial paintings are of the romantic and neoclassicist style.

Furthermore, Urdaneta is considered to be the father of modern Dominican sculpture. In 1903 he created his most celebrated sculpture, "One of many", of a wounded soldier, left on the ground, with torn clothes and a bare chest, for which he obtained the most recognition in the Republic and the world. In 2009, this sculpture was removed due to the remodeling of Galicia Park. His other most famous sculpture is "Caonabo", of the Taino rebel that evokes the Spanish injustices against the indigenous peoples of the island.

In 1908 with support from the central government of Ramón Cáceres, he opened an academy of drawing, painting and sculpture that trained many future artists. He taught there until his death.

== Politics ==
Urdaneta was a vocal opponent of the First U.S. Occupation from 1916 - 1924. His "Invocación" poster in which Dominican Republic is represented as a female figure with arms raised and hands held by the claws of an eagle, became widely circulated throughout the country.

== Selected works ==
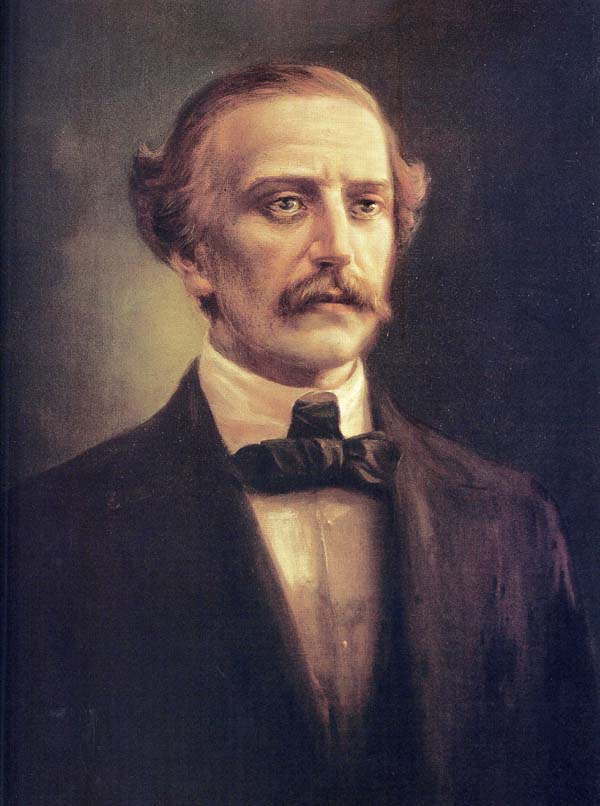
Oil portrait of Juan Pablo Duarte by Abelardo Rodríguez Urdaneta.

- El Extraviado
- Los Jugadores
- Juramento de Duarte
- Cupido
- Pedazo de costa
- Recuerdos del Sur,
- El Memphis,
- El Castini
- A la mar
- Paisaje del crepúsculo
- Barcas
- Abnegación
- La libertad de Cuba
- (El asesinato del Presidente Ramón Cáceres
- Horacio Vásquez
- Escudo Constitucional Dominicano
- La figura de Juan Pablo Duarte
- La Libertad
- La Independencia
- Invocación
- Cabeza de indio Siboney
- Los náufragos del tres de Septiembre
- El último Tributo

== Gallery ==
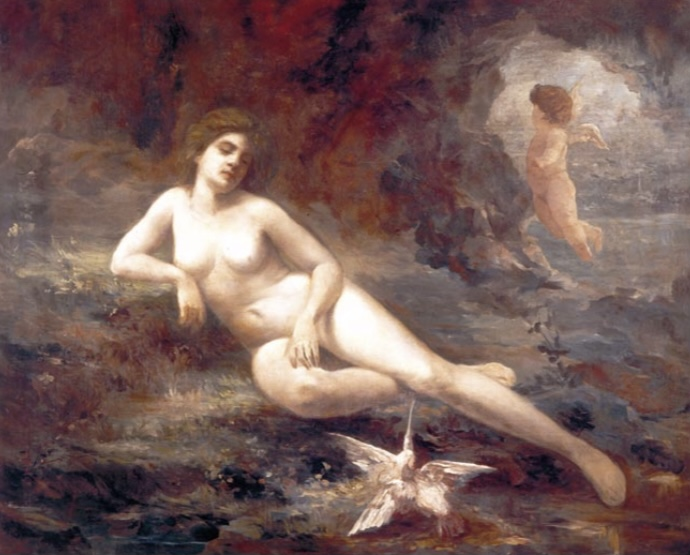
Al Amor que Llega

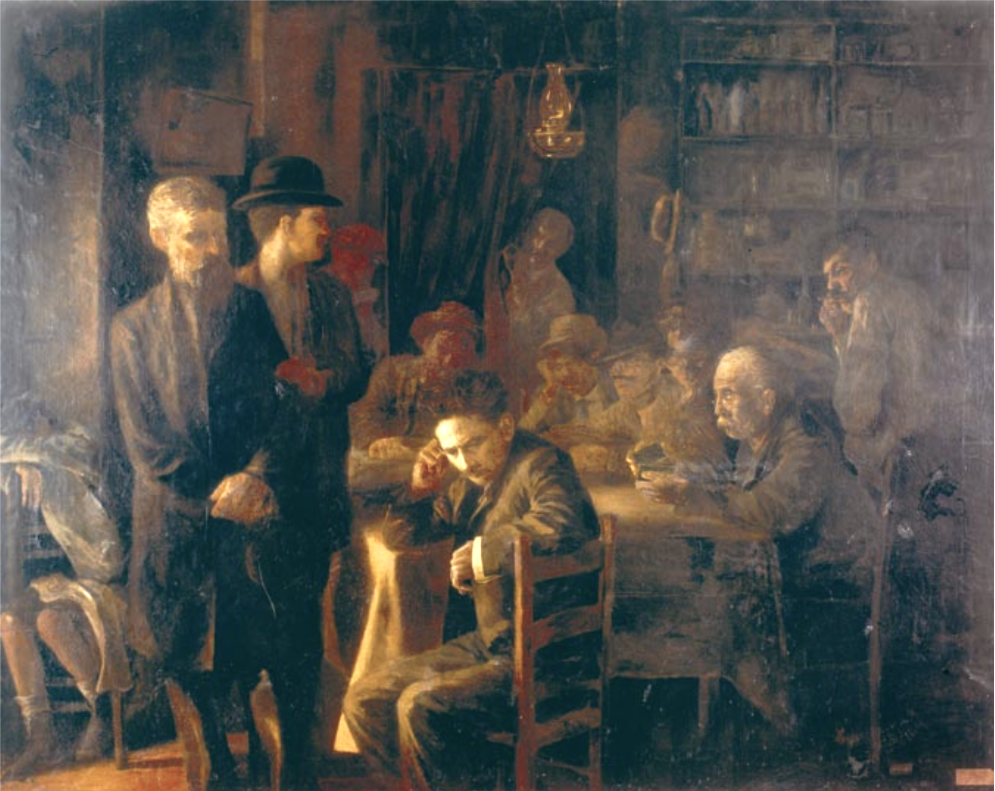
Rodriguez Urdaneta, "El extraviado.” 1907

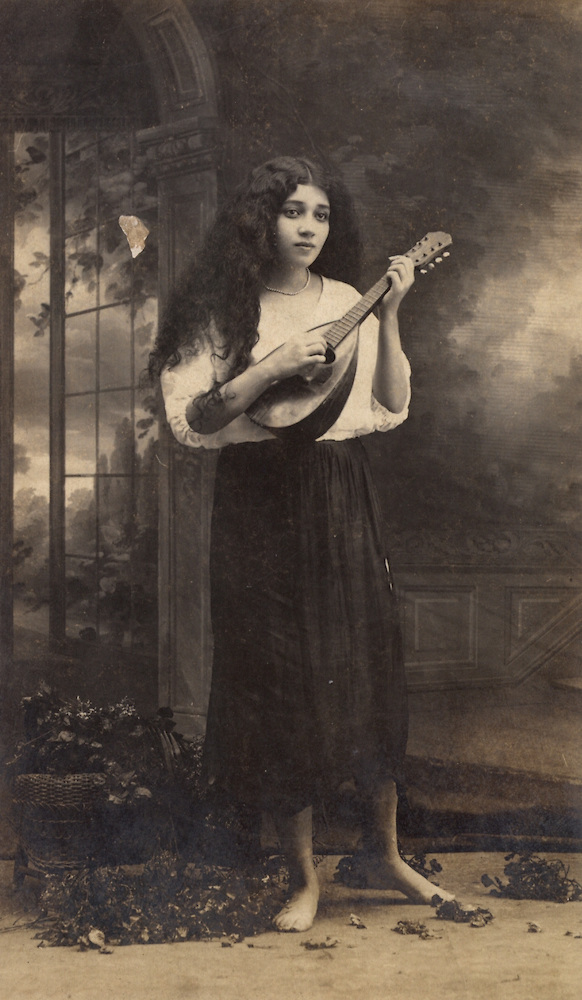

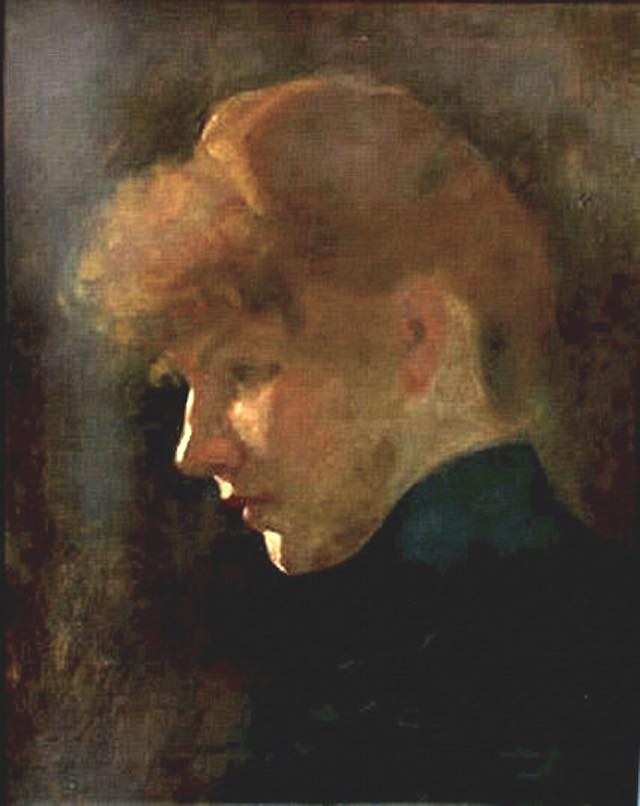
Abelardo Rodríguez Urdaneta. Perfil de Mujer, Year unknown / Sin fecha.

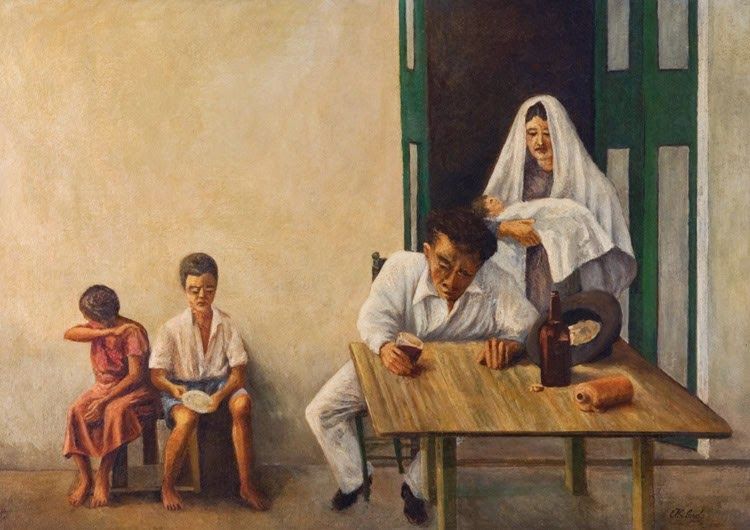
Abelardo Rodríguez Urdaneta. “Miseria Humana. c. unknown

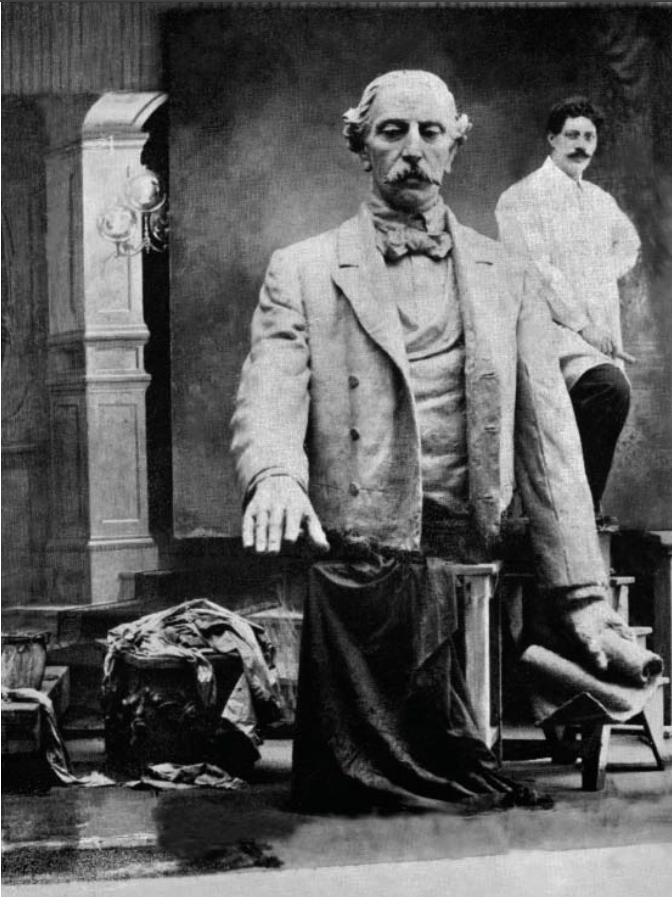
Abelardo Rodríguez Urdaneta. Self portrait with Duarte bust. C. unknown

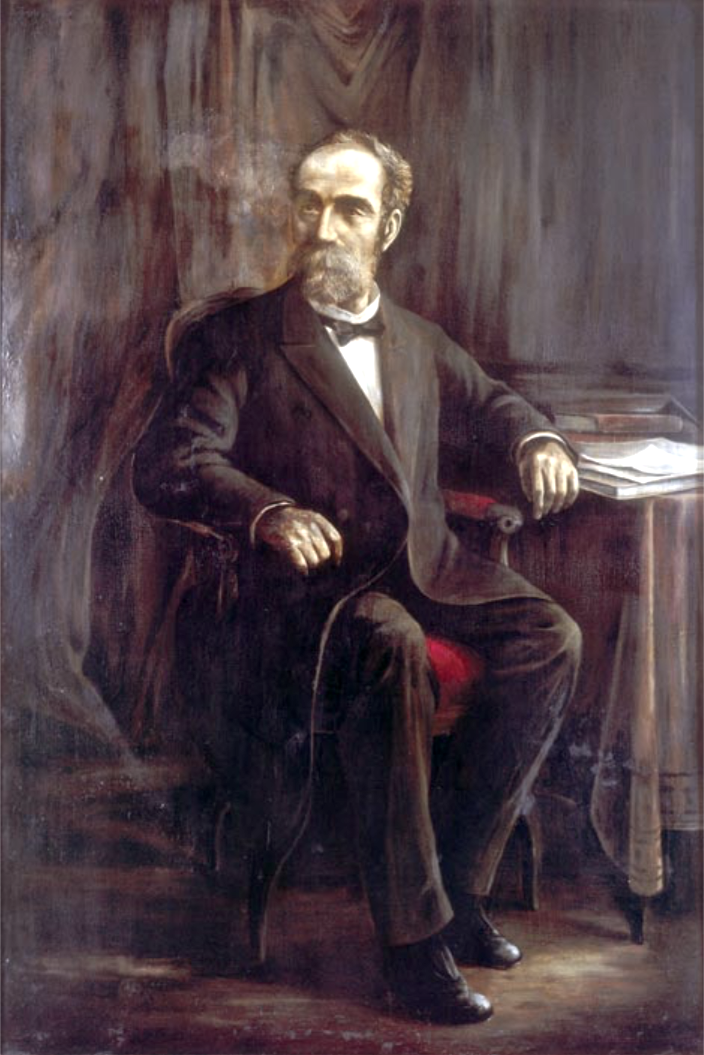
Abelardo Rodríguez Urdaneta. Eugenio María de Hostos. C. 1908

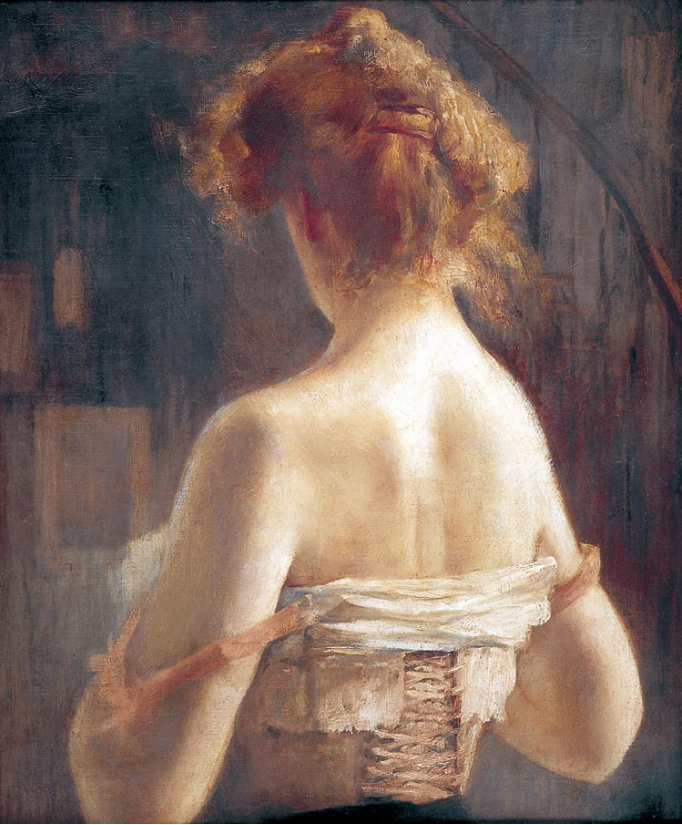
Abelardo Rodríguez Urdaneta. Urdaneta. Mujer de espalda. date unknown

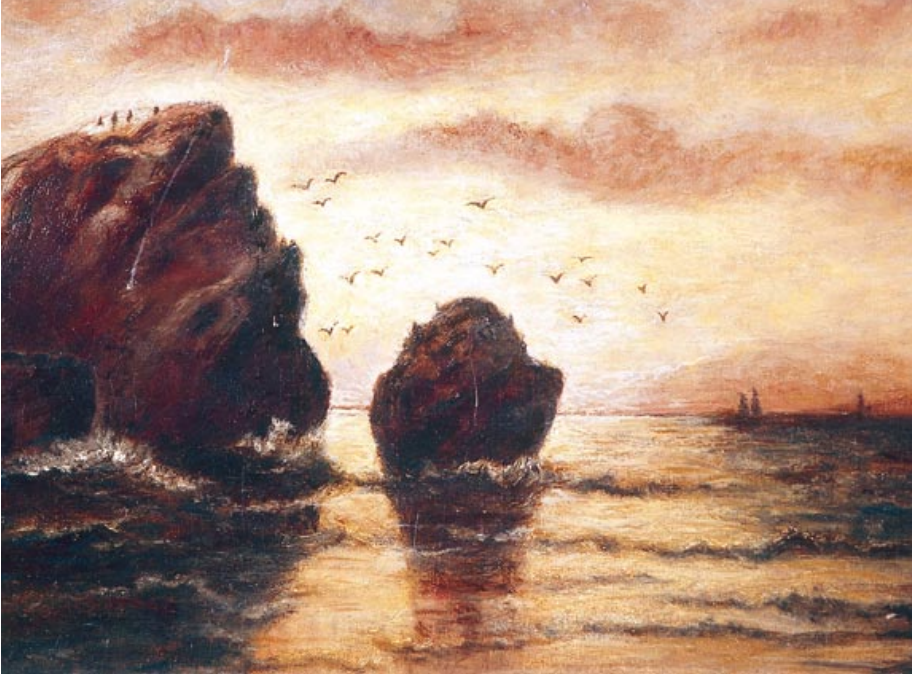
Abelardo Rodríguez Urdaneta. Marina. date unknown.
