= Ulises Francisco Espaillat =

Dominican statesman and businessman (1823–1878)

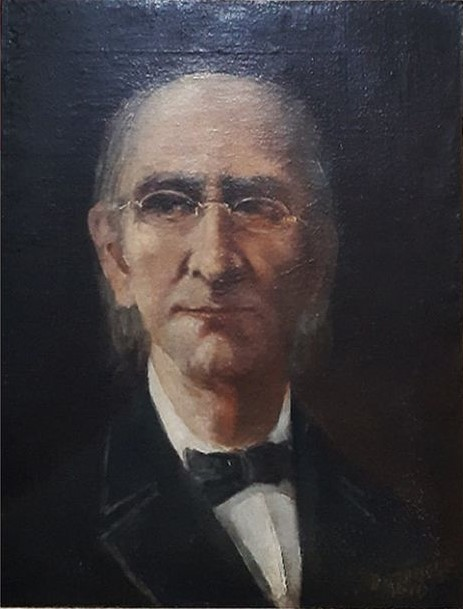

15th President of the Dominican Republic
- In office April 29, 1876 – October 5, 1876
- Preceded by: Council of Secretaries of State
- Succeeded by: Superior Governing Junta

Personal details
- Born: February 9, 1823 Saint-Yague, Cibao Department, Haiti (now Santiago, Santiago Province, Dominican Republic)
- Died: April 25, 1878 (aged 55) Santiago, Santiago Province, Dominican Republic
- Spouse: Eloísa Espaillat
- Children: 6
- Relatives: Francisco Espaillat (grandfather); Santiago Espaillat (uncle); Rhina Espaillat (1st cousin, 5x removed)
- Occupation: Druggist/apothecary, spirits brewer, baker, politician

Ulises Francisco Espaillat Quiñones (February 9, 1823 – April 25, 1878) was a 19th-century Dominican Republic liberal statesman and author. He served as president of the Dominican Republic from April 29, 1876, to October 5, 1876. Espaillat Province is named after him.

== Early life ==
Ulises Francisco Espaillat Quiñones was born on 9 February 1823 in Santiago, officially known from 1822 to 1844 as Saint-Yague, into a wealthy family of French, Canarian, Aragonese and Genovese descent; he was the only son of Pedro Ramón Espaillat Velilla (Santiago, 1796−idem, 1882) and María Petronila Quiñones Tavares (1804−1874). His father was the tenth and junior child of Francisco Espaillat y Virol —a Frenchman native to Masclat that settled in Santiago in 1758 in an epoch where one-third of the population was of French origin— and Petronila Velilla Sánchez —whose father was born in Aragon, and her maternal grandfather was from the Canary Islands and a great-grandfather was from Italy. He was described by his contemporaries as a tall, pale-complexioned, blue-eyed, dark blond-haired man.

In his early childhood and adolescence he received lessons in English, French, music, mathematics and other disciplines, within the limited possibilities of school education that the country lived under the Haitian occupation. He later received medical lessons from a paternal uncle, Dr. Santiago Espaillat (who later became President-elect in 1849). Ulises Espaillat established a pharmacy in the early 1840s.

In 1845, he married his first cousin, Eloísa Espaillat Rodríguez, the daughter of his uncle Juan José Espaillat Velilla.

== Politics ==
Espaillat served in many offices, including Senator, member of the House of Representatives, Customs Inspector of Puerto Plata, and member of the Provincial Deputation of Santiago. He opposed the 1861 Spanish colonial restoration, and as a result, he was exiled; he returned to his country in 1863. He served as Vice President in 1864.

With the support of Gregorio Luperón, Espaillat won the March 24, 1876, presidential election. Espaillat was a political and economic liberal who wished to broaden the personal freedoms of the Dominican people and improve the country's economy by taking from the producers of the society in order to pay for his ideas. However, he was forced to resign (on December 20, 1876) before he could set in motion any plan of action, due to rebellions in the south and east.

== Legacy ==
Espaillat Province, as well as the Ulises Francisco Espaillat metro station in Santo Domingo are named after him.

== Ancestry ==
Ancestors of Ulises Francisco Espaillat

8. (Kingdom of France) Jean Espailhac
4. (Kingdom of France) Francisco Antonio Espaillat y Virol (né François Antoine Espailhac; 1734–1807)
9. (Kingdom of France) Marguerite Virol Lamargot
2. Pedro Ramón Espaillat Velilla (1796–1882)
10. (Spain) (Aragon) Francisco Antonio Velilla de Torres
5. Petronila Velilla y Sánchez-Moreno (1767–?)
11. María Sánchez-Moreno y Filpo (1740–1805)
1. Ulises Francisco Espaillat Quiñones (1823–1878)
6. Tomás Quiñones (Kingdom of France)
3. María Petronila Quiñones Tavares (1788–1874)
7. Francisca Tabares

== Offspring ==
President Espaillat has been identified as the most recent common ancestor for most of the Dominican oligarchy and aristocracy, since his offspring managed to establish bonds with the most prominent families from Santiago, who became later the richest families of the country.

- Ulises Francisco Espaillat Velilla his cousin Eloísa Espaillat Rodríguez (Santiago, 1818–ibid., 1919)
  - Teófilo Espaillat Espaillat (Santiago, 1847–1866); never got married.
  - Augusto Espaillat Espaillat (Santiago, 1849–1896) Felicia Amalia Julia Julia (1859–1911)
    - Enrique de Jesús Espaillat Julia (1877–1934) Ana Idalia González Nouel (1878–1970)
      - María Eloisa “Mayoya” Espaillat González (Santiago, 1899–ibidem, 1991) José Ignacio Bermúdez Ramos
        - Ana Idalia Bermúdez Espaillat (1924–1999) her second-cousin once-removed Edmundo Enrique Batlle Viñas
          - Edmundo Batlle Bermúdez Claudia Cabral Lluberes (b. 1964)
            - Ana Amelia Batlle Cabral
            - Laura Emilia Batlle Cabral
        - Erasmo Bermúdez Espaillat (1929–1961) his cousin Ana Luisa Bermúdez Castillo
      - Felicia Altagracia Espaillat González (1900–1933) Juan Tomás Tavares Julia
        - Gustavo Tavares Espaillat
        - Manuel Enrique Tavares Espaillat
      - Amantina Rafaela Espaillat González (1903–2006) Manuel Alejandro Grullón Rodríguez-Objío (1895–1985)
        - Alejandro Enrique Grullón Espaillat (b. 1929) Ana Dínorah Viñas Messina (1952–2001); Melba Segura Castillo
          - Manuel Alejandro Grullón Viñas (b. 1953) Rosa “Cuchita” Hernández
            - Manuel Alejandro Grullón Hernández Stephanie Baud
          - Virginia Grullón Viñas José Ramón Prats
          - Eduardo Grullón Viñas (died in 2025) Jhoanna Rodríguez
          - Alexandra María Grullón Segura (1998–2025)
    - Ulises Francisco Espaillat Julia (Santiago, 1879–1933) Aracelis Carrón Mora
      - Ulises Augusto Espaillat Carrón Margarita Mercedes Vega Espaillat
        - José Ulises Espaillat Vega (1931–1947)
        - Margarita Mercedes Espaillat Vega (1938–1960)
      - María Matilde Espaillat Carrón Mario Giusseppe Schiffino Gorra
      - Estela Mercedes Espaillat Carrón
    - Pedro Ramón Espaillat Julia (Santiago, 1882–1965) Eleonora Grullón Rodríguez-Objío (1900–1978)
      - Alejandro Augusto Espaillat Grullón (Santiago, 1904–Santo Domingo, 1984) Josefina Eugenia Cabral Bermúdez
        - Pedro Ramón Espaillat Cabral (1943–1985)
        - Alejandro Augusto Espaillat Cabral (1948–)
          - Alejandro José Espaillat Imbert
          - Pedro José Espaillat Vélez
          - Carlos José Espaillat Vélez
        - Fineta Rosario Espaillat Cabral
      - María del Rosario Espaillat Grullón José Manuel Elmúdesi Porcella
        - Leonor Rosario Elmúdesi Espaillat Juan Francisco Bancalari Brugal
          - Juan José Bancalari Elmúdesi
          - Manuel Andrés Bancalari Elmúdesi
      - Mariana Felicia Espaillat Grullón Luis Crouch Bogaert
        - Luis Arturo Crouch Espaillat
        - Miguel Eduardo Crouch Espaillat
        - Ramón Alejando Crouch Espaillat
        - María del Rosario Crouch Espaillat
    - María Enriqueta Espaillat Julia (Santiago, 1884–1915) her cousin Juan Julio Julia Ricardo (Santiago, 1879–Moca, 1934)
      - José Oscar Julia Espaillat (1914–1987) Olga Marranzini Marra
      - Carmen Virginia Julia Marranzini (b. 1946)
      - María Rosa Julia Marranzini (b. 1955)
    - Eloísa Espaillat Julia (Santiago, 1885–1976) José Cayetano Vega Llenas
      - Gustavo Eduardo Vega Espaillat (1904–1989)
      - Augusto Vega Espaillat
        - José Augusto Vega Imbert
      - Margarita Mercedes Vega Espaillat Ulises Augusto Espaillat Carrón
        - José Ulises Espaillat Vega (1931–1967)
        - Margarita Mercedes Espaillat Vega (1938–1960)
    - María Mercedes Espaillat Julia (Santiago, 1886–1917)
    - María Matilde Espaillat Julia (Santiago, 1889–1976) Andrés Alejandro Pastoriza Valverde (1887–?)
      - Andrés Alejandro Pastoriza Espaillat (1914–1994); never got married.
      - Tomás Augusto “Jimmy” Pastoriza Espaillat (1919–2002) Claudina Julia Tavares Grieser (1923–2011)
        - María Matilde Pastoriza Tavares (b. 1946) Roberto Bonnetti Guerra
        - Andrés Gustavo Pastoriza Tavares (b. 1948)
      - María Matilde Pastoriza Espaillat (b. 1923) Héctor Rafael García-Godoy Cáceres (1921–1970)
        - Ana Matilde García-Godoy Pastoriza (1946–1987) Manuel Alvarez Reyes
        - Guillermo García-Godoy Pastoriza (b. 1950) Elisa Aleone Alfonseca Giner de los Ríos; Jonnie Ann Burch
    - Felicia Espaillat Julia (Santiago, 1891–1972)
  - María Dolores “Lola” Espaillat Espaillat (Santiago, 1853–ibid., 1936) José Joaquín Batlle Filbá (Mataró, Spain, 1844–Santiago, 1899)
    - Jaime José Batlle Espaillat (1873–1923) Tomasina de la Caridad Vega Llenas (Santiago, 1880–Santo Domingo, 1964)
      - Jaime Tomás Batlle Vega
      - Rosa Amelia Batlle Vega
      - María Mercedes Batlle Vega
      - Felipe José Batlle Vega
      - Nydia Amalia Batlle Vega
      - María Cristina Batlle Vega Miguel Ángel Delgado Sosa (Santo Domingo, 1894–1970)
        - Tomasina Altagracia Delgado Batlle (b. 1929) Manuel María Alfaro Ricart (m. 1952); Rafael Mencía Lister (m. 1961)
        - María Cristina Brea Batlle Alberto Bonetti Burgos
      - Augusto Batlle Vega Enma Ginebra de la Rocha
        - Altagracia Mercedes Batlle Ginebra Federico Antún Abud
          - Federico Antún Batlle
    - María Asunción Batlle Espaillat (Santiago, 1876–Santo Domingo, 1972) José Nicolás Vega Llenas (Santiago, 1867–ibid., 1925)
      - Carmen María Vega Batlle Pedro Manuel Olavarrieta Pérez
      - Mercedes Amalia Vega Batlle José María Cabral Bermúdez
        - José María Cabral Vega (b. 1933) Graciela Genoveva Lluberes Henríquez
          - Amalia Josefina Gabriela Cabral Lluberes (b. 1963)
          - Claudia Cabral Lluberes (b. 1964) Edmundo Batlle Bermúdez
            - Ana Amelia Batlle Cabral
            - Laura Emilia Batlle Cabral
          - José María Cabral Lluberes (b. 1967)
        - Petrica Cabral Vega (b. 1938) José León Asensio (b. 1934)
          - María Amalia León Cabral (b. 1960) Marcos Augusto Jorge Elías
            - Sarah Amalia Jorge León
          - Lidia Josefina León Cabral (b. 1962) Luis Domingo Viyella Caolo
          - José Eduardo León Cabral (1963–1975); never got married.
        - María Josefina Cabral Vega Manuel Vicente Díez Méndez
          - Manuel Vicente Díez Cabral (b. 1964)
        - Marco Buenaventura Cabral Vega
      - María Dolores Vega Batlle
      - Julio Francisco Vega Batlle Teresa Boyrie de Moya
        - Wenceslao Nicolás Vega Boyrie
        - Bernardo Vega Boyrie
        - Luis Eduardo “Eddy” Vega Boyrie
      - Prima Aurora Vega Batlle
      - Carlos Manuel Vega Batlle
      - Virginia Vega Batlle
      - Jaime Rafael Vega Batlle (1906–1970) Elsa López-Penha Alfau
        - Jaime Enrique Vega López-Penha Ángela Peynado Garrigosa
      - Rosa María Vega Batlle
      - Francisco Nicolás Vega Batlle
    - Manuel Francisco Batlle Espaillat (Santiago, 1878–1946) Clara Nadelia Viñas Malagón
      - Carmen Rosa Batlle Viñas Aquiles Bermúdez Ramos
      - Clara Nadelia Batlle Viñas Jacques Thomén Candelario
      - Edmundo Enrique Batlle Viñas his second-cousin once-removed Ana Idalia Bermúdez Espaillat (1924–1999)
        - Edmundo Batlle Bermúdez Claudia Cabral Lluberes (b. 1964)
          - Ana Amelia Batlle Cabral
          - Laura Emilia Batlle Cabral
      - José Abelardo Batlle Viñas (1904-1995) Lucía Victoria Brugal André (1908–1995)
      - Mario Antonio Batlle Viñas (1908–2012) Otilia Mercedes Bertha Franco Fondeur (1915-1995)
    - María Dolores Batlle Espaillat (Santiago, 1879–ibidem, 1879); never got married.
    - José Francisco Batlle Espaillat (Santiago, 1880–1980)
    - Cosme Antonio Batlle Espaillat (Santiago, 1881–1914)
    - Rafael Batlle Espaillat (Santiago, 1883–ibid. 1909) Matilde Julia Ricardo
      - Mercedes Dolores Batlle Julia
    - Juan Francisco Batlle Espaillat (Santiago, 1885–ibidem, 1958) his third-cousin Amelia Dolores Morell Espaillat
      - Aída Mercedes Batlle Morell (1909–2011) Rafael Filiberto Bonnelly Fondeur (1904–1979)
        - Luisa Amelia Bonnelly Batlle Rafael Hernández Mota
        - Rafael Francisco Bonnelly Batlle Lucía Ricart Pellerano (†); Margarita Casals
        - Juan Sully Bonnelly Batlle Pura Álvarez
        - Aída Mercedes Bonnelly Batlle Reynaldo Bisonó
          - Reinaldo Bisonó Bonnelly
      - Cosme Rafael Batlle Morell
      - Daysi Antonia Batlle Morell
      - Oscar Rafael Batlle Morell
      - Roberto Augusto Batlle Morell
      - Víctor Manuel Batlle Morell Lourdes Lidilia Jorge Blanco (Santiago, 1922–ibidem, 2001)
      - Juan José Batlle Morell (Santiago, 1907–1975) María Eva Álvarez Pereyra
      - Luis Tomás Batlle Morell (Santiago, 1917–La Ciénaga de Higüerito, 1942)
    - Rosa Mercedes Batlle Espaillat (Santiago, 1887–1972) Manuel Arturo Tavares Julia
      - Julia Dolores Tavares Batlle Domingo Octavio Bermúdez Ramos
      - Rosa María Tavares Batlle (Santiago, 1911–ibid., 2000) Marco Antonio Cabral Bermúdez
        - Julia Amelia Cabral Tavares Frank Joseph Thomén Lembcke
        - Manuel José Cabral Tavares
    - Augusto Batlle Espaillat (Santiago, 1888–ibidem, 1979) Asunción Coralia Nicolás Rodríguez
    - María del Carmen Batlle Espaillat (Santiago, 1890–1971) Salvador Augusto Cocco Pastoriza (1892–1995)
      - Manuel Augusto Cocco Batlle Gisela Guerrero Dujarric
        - Manuel Augusto Cocco Guerrero
        - Miguel Salvador Cocco Guerrero (Santiago, 1941–Santo Domingo, 2009) Aura Minerva González Tabar
        - Patricia Margarita Cocco Guerrero
        - Pedro José Cocco Guerrero
      - Carmen Aura Cocco Batlle Federico Thomén Candelario
    - Ana Mercedes Batlle Espaillat (Santiago, 1893–ibidem, 1981) José Mauricio Álvarez Perelló
      - Ana Antonia Álvarez Batlle Jean Antonio Haché Zogbi
  - Adela Espaillat Espaillat (Santiago, 1856–1946)
  - Sofía Espaillat Espaillat (Santiago, 1857–1895) Pílades Stéfani Viegani (Barga, Italy, 1854–Santiago, 1928)
    - María Italia Stéfani Espaillat (1881–1882)
    - María Filomena Stéfani Espaillat (Santiago, 1882–ibid., 1967) Manuel Antonio Valverde Olivo
      - Mercedes Octavia Valverde Stéfani
      - María Sofía Valverde Stéfani
      - Manuel Antonio Valverde Stéfani (1906–1976) Caridad Rafaela Lara Viñas (Moca, 1908-1979, 1932)
        - Manuel Antonio Valverde Lara Jr (Santiago, 1933) Nilda Isabel Rivera Rivera (Jayuya, Puerto Rico, 1933)
          - Marie Isabel Valverde Rivera (1964)
          - Jose Manuel Valverde Rivera (1969) Viviana Alexandra Aviles Garcia (1973)
            - Jose Daniel Valverde (1994)
            - Luis Antonio Valverde (2001)
        - Fernando Emilio Valverde Lara (1935-2020) Idalia Lopez Gonzalez (1935)
          - Mary Jo Valverde Lopez (1958)
          - Virginia Maria Valverde Lopez (1959)
          - Fernando Emilio Valverde Lopez (1960)
          - Emilie Anne Valverde Lopez (1962)
      - Sebastián Emilio Valverde Stéfani (1911–1962)
    - María Electa Stéfani Espaillat (Santiago, 1884–ibid., 1972)
    - María Adela Stéfani Espaillat (Santiago, 1889–ibid., 1953) Anibal Comolli Becchi
    - Juan Bautista Stéfani Espaillat (1893–1938)
  - Rafael de Jesús Espaillat Espaillat (Santiago, 1863–1949) María Encarnación Gutiérrez
    - Rafael Armando Espaillat Gutiérrez (1886–1952)
    - Juan de Jesús Espaillat Gutiérrez (1887–1979)
    - Isabel Estelvina Espaillat Gutiérrez (1890–1914)
