= Nuria Piera =

Dominican journalist (born 1960)

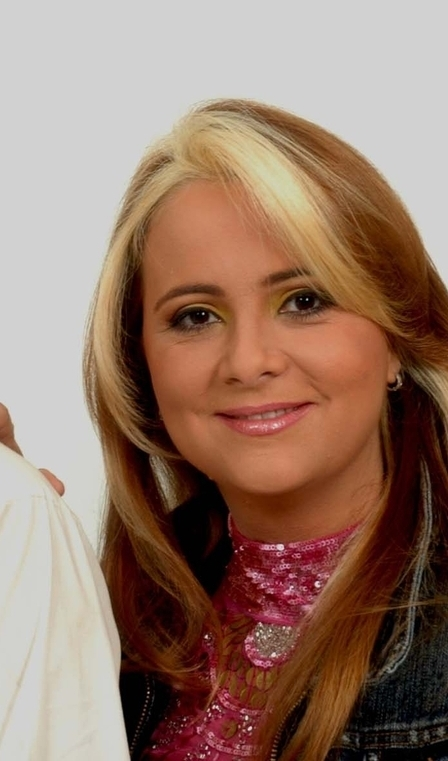
- Born: Nuria Esperanza Piera Gainza
- Occupations: Investigative journalist, TV producer, lawyer
- Spouse: Pablo McKinney (married 1999–divorced 2001)
- Partner: Felíx Jiménez (2005)
- Children: Leslie Paola McKinney Piera (b. 2001)
- Parent(s): Bernarda Modesta Gainza Oñez (1921–2004), José Enrique Piera Puig (1924–1970)
- Awards: Soberano Award: El Gran Soberano (1999); Soberano Award for Best Weekly Programme of Investigative Journalism (1988, 1989, 1990, 1992, 1993, 1996, 1997, 1998, 1999, 2001, 2002, 2003, 2004, 2005, 2006, 2007, 2011); Hija Benemérita de la Ciudad de Santo Domingo
- Website: nuria.com.do

Nuria Esperanza Piera Gainza (born 29 June 1960) is a Dominican journalist specializing in investigative journalism. Piera is CEO of NCDN, a news production company in CDN (channel 37); she is also owner of Provideo.

== Biography ==
Piera was born in Santo Domingo to immigrants from Spain: her mother was Basque and her father was Catalan. Piera was orphaned at 10 years old when her father, journalist José Enrique Piera Puig, was killed in 1970 by the authoritarian regime of Joaquín Balaguer.

== Career ==
In September 2013, a news investigation led by Piera revealed that the Papal Nuncio of Santo Domingo, Józef Wesołowski, whom Pope Francis had dismissed, was not removed from office due to a dispute he held for three years with Puerto Rican Cardinal Roberto González Nieves, as stated in the Italian and Dominican press and as insinuated by the archbishop of Santo Domingo Cardinal Nicolás de Jesús López Rodríguez, but instead due to the consumption of alcoholic beverages in areas of dubious reputation and abuse of children and adolescent males, This emerged as another scandal of pederasty in the Catholic Church.

In 2014, EFE listed her as one of the most influential women in Ibero-America.

In May 2023, human rights organizations Amnesty International and Citizen Lab confirmed that a mobile device belonging to Nuria Piera was targeted by Pegasus spyware at least three times between 2020 and 2021, likely in connection to Piera's investigations of governmental corruption and impunity. This is the first confirmed use of spyware against a journalist in the Dominican Republic.

== Personal life ==
Nuria married journalist and broadcaster Pablo McKinney, from whose union was born Nuria's only daughter, Leslie Paola McKinney.
