= Catherine Espaillat =

American astronomer

Catherine C. Espaillat is an American astronomer whose research is focused on the formation of planets, including the study of protoplanetary disks and young stellar objects. She is a full professor of astronomy at Boston University, where she directs the Institute for Astrophysical Research.

== Education and career ==
Espaillat comes from a working-class immigrant family; her parents emigrated to the US from the Dominican Republic. She was interested in astronomy since childhood, but entered Columbia University intending to become a physician; her focus changed to a career in astronomy after taking an introductory course in the subject as a sophomore. After graduating in 2003 with a degree in astronomy, she went to the University of Michigan for graduate study, earned a master's degree there in 2005, and completed her Ph.D. in 2009, under the supervision of Nuria Calvet.

She became a postdoctoral researcher at the Harvard–Smithsonian Center for Astrophysics from 2009 to 2013, supported by the National Science Foundation and by a NASA Carl Sagan Postdoctoral Fellowship. Next, she joined the Boston University Department of Astronomy as an assistant professor in 2013. She was promoted to associate professor in 2020.

Espaillat became aware of major disparities in academia, most notably in the lack of access to information. This drove her to work for a peer support group “to make the known unknown and demystify academia so that the right answers to the questions aren’t available based on sheer luck.” Espaillat is the director of the League of Underrepresented Minoritized Astronomers (LUMA), a peer mentoring community for women from underrepresented groups in astronomy and related fields, which she founded in 2015. Espaillat also serves as the Co-Principal Investigator on the ODYSSEUS project and an investigator on the Scientific Advisory Committee for the ULLYSES program.

== Research contributions ==
Espaillat is renowned for identifying pre-transitional disks around low-mass, pre-main sequence T Tauri stars. These disks feature a cleared central region between inner and outer dust rings, providing evidence for dust clearing due to planet formation rather than photoevaporation. She utilized observations from the Spitzer Space Telescope and NASA’s Infrared Telescope Facility, alongside models co-developed with her advisor, to identify these structures. Her predictions were later confirmed by observing a young planet in the pre-transitional disk of star LKCa 15.

== Recognition ==
In 2015, Espaillat received the CAREER award from the National Science Foundation. Espaillat was named as a Sloan Research Fellow and as a Kavli Fellow of the National Academy of Sciences in 2016. In 2022, the American Association for the Advancement of Science named Espaillat as an AAAS Fellow.

She was a keynote speaker at the 2019 annual meeting of the American Astronomical Society; she was also named a Scialog Fellow by the Research Corporation for Science Advancement the same year.

She was part of a keynote panel titled "How to be Yourself and Succeed as an Under-represented Engineering Faculty?" at Purdue University's Trailblazers in Engineering program in 2022.
