= Félix Evaristo Mejía =

Dominican writer

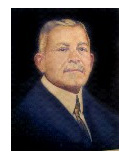
- Born: Félix Evaristo Mejía Abreu; 27 September 1866; Santo Domingo, Dominican Republic
- Died: 1 July 1945 (aged 78); Santo Domingo, Dominican Republic
- Occupations: Writer, diplomat, educator
- Spouse: Mercedes Natalia Ricart Pérez
- Children: Gustavo, Ofelia, Publio
- Parents: Juan Tomás Mejía Cotes (1843–1906) (father); María Tomasina Abreu García (1847–1906) (mother)

Félix Evaristo Mejía (September 27, 1866 – July 1, 1945) was a Dominican Republic writer, diplomat, and educator. He was a member of the Union Nationalist group representing an important role in the struggle for Dominican sovereignty against United States military intervention (1916–1924). In the Superior Institute of Teacher Education Salomé Ureña there is a site that bears his name.

== Early life ==
Mejía was born on September 26, 1866, in Santo Domingo, Dominican Republic. He studied at the Colegio San Luis Gonzaga, from where he went to the School of Santo Domingo, becoming director of the latter, a position he held subsequently in public education.

In 1884, he went into exile in Caracas, Venezuela, in opposition to the dictatorial Ulises Heureaux. In Venezuela, he devoted himself to teaching, shortly after returning to the Dominican Republic, where he continued his career as a teacher.

== Career ==
In 1890, on his return to Santo Domingo he had to replace his teacher Eugenio Maria de Hostos in the direction as head of the school. As the general superintendent of education, Félix Evaristo had the opportunity to contribute his ideas to the progress of Dominican culture during the period characterized by violence, uncertainty and growing political and economic aggression by the United States in the country. School organization of the time and its relative expansion is due largely to his activity with secular and positivist orientation of Hostos guy who had bequeathed Hostos. Also, many of his published mainly in the fields of history and literature, as well as its activity as an organizer and owner of the first Dominican library, the Library Selecta, works especially addressed his heartfelt desire to fill bibliographic needs as a means of contributing to the intellectual and moral formation of the Dominican youth.

== Personal life ==
Mejía was married to Natalia Pérez Ricart, with whom he had three children; Ofelia, Gustavo and Publio. His son Gustavo was also a prominent Dominican writer.
