= Francisco Espaillat =

French-born surgeon and businessperson

Lieutenant-Governor of the Captaincy General of Santo Domingo for the Northern region
- In office 1783–1786
- Monarch: Charles III of Spain
- Governor: 1. Isidoro de Peralta y Rojas; 2. Joaquín García y Moreno
- Succeeded by: Miguel Negrete

Administrator of the Royal Tobacco Factory of Santiago
- In office 1781–?
- Preceded by: Francisco Antonio Velilla y Torres

Personal details
- Born: 29 May 1734 Masclat, Kingdom of France
- Died: 20 October 1807 (aged 73) Aguadilla, Captaincy General of Puerto Rico, Spanish Empire: 1. Catalina Tavares y Zapata; 2. Petronila Velilla y Sánchez
- Children: 14
- Relatives: Francisco Antonio Velilla (father-in-law) Ulises Espaillat (grandson) Rhina Espaillat (5th-great-granddaughter)
- Occupation: public officer, cattle rancher, sugar, tobacco and indigo planter
- Profession: surgeon and physician

Francisco Espaillat y Virol (1734 – 1807) was a French-born surgeon, public officer, cattle rancher, and sugar, indigo and tobacco planter in the Captaincy General of Santo Domingo. As the largest slaveholder in this Spanish colony, he became one of the wealthiest men there and the ancestor of most of the present-day elite in Santiago, and the Dominican Republic elite in general, as his descendants used to marry with other upper-class families.

== Early life ==
Born in Masclat, Duchy of Guyenne (today in Lot), Kingdom of France to a blacksmith (whose name in Spanish documents appears translated as Juan Espaillat) and his wife (Margarita Virol y Lamargot), on 29 May 1734. Espaillat was a surgeon who settled briefly in Cap-Français, then capital of the French colony of Saint-Domingue located in Western Hispaniola.

== Life in Santo Domingo ==
In 1756, Espaillat migrated eastward to the Spanish side of the island of Hispaniola, settling in Santiago, capital of the Northern region of the Captaincy General of Santo Domingo also known as the Cibao region, invited by Antonio Quiñones; two years later, he was legally authorised to exercise his profession in the Spanish colony.

From 1761, Espaillat started to buy lands, ranches and sugar mills so by the late-1780s he owned 15 hatos (cattle ranches), 2 estancias and 4 sugar mills and his net worth was estimated at 200,000 Spanish dollars (equivalent to $7 million in 2025). His fortune was so massive that he was undoubtedly the richest man in Cibao and one of the wealthiest men in the Spanish colony, rivaling Old money elite families from the city of Santo Domingo such as the Guridi, Coca-Landeche, de la Rocha, and Angulo, and even surpassing individuals from the Castro-Rivera, Campuzano-Polanco, and other 12 elite families. (Note: The other elite families are: Frómesta, Heredia, Leos-Echalaz, Mañón, Lara, Pérez-Caro, Arredondo, Urdaneta, Coronado, Lecanda, Alarcón, and Sterling.) He became the largest slaveholder —by a large margin— in the Spanish colony with over 1,000 slaves throughout all of his properties. Most of his slaves were imported from either Saint-Domingue or Africa, and many records of the African ethnicities of his slaves are still preserved.

His butler was Pedro Armaignac, of French origin too.

Espaillat became a Spanish subject on 17 August 1787 when King Charles III of Spain naturalised him by decree; he paid a tax of 5,100 maravedís (18.75 Spanish dollars).

Espaillat was the Medic and Main Surgeon of the infantry troops in Santiago, La Vega, Monte Christi, and Puerto Plata.

He became administrator of the Royal Tobacco Factory of Santiago and had a salary of 60 Spanish dollars per month.

As a philanthropist, Espaillat donated over 5,700 Spanish dollars to the Our Lady of the Assumption Hospital in Santiago. He also treated poor patients for free.

== Later life and death ==
Espaillat fled the island in 1805 with his family, after the invasion of Jean-Jacques Dessalines to Santo Domingo, fleeing the massacres against the Dominicans committed by the Haitian army, moving to Aguadilla, in the Western side of the Spanish Captaincy General of Puerto Rico.

He died in 1807 alienated from the great fortune he amassed and without the power he once held. Nevertheless, his children were able to return to Santo Domingo and retrieve his estates in 1815 during the España Boba period. They bought new slaves as their former slaves were freed.

== Marriages and family ==
Espaillat married twice. His first wife was Catalina Tavares y Zapata and he gave a dower of 600 Spanish dollars; he had 1 son with her. His second wife was Petronila Velilla y Sánchez, who was from an elite family, and he gave a dower of 7,000 Spanish dollars, one of the highest dowers ever given in the Spanish colony of Santo Domingo. With Velilla he had 13 children.

His father-in-law, the Aragonese don Francisco Antonio Velilla y Torres, was the Lieutenant-Governor of the Northern region until his death in 1781, an office that Espaillat later held from 1783 to 1786. Velilla also was the Administrator of the Royal Tobacco Factory of Santiago from 1770 till his death, and was succeeded per Governor Isidro Peralta's decree by Espaillat. Velilla had a considerable fortune and yeld political and social-economical power, and he married a woman from the Criollo elite: doña María Sánchez y Firpo (whose father was a Spaniard, and her maternal grandfather was Italian).

He brought the surname "Espaillat" (Note: "Espaillat" is a hispanization. It is not clear which is the original French (or rather Occitan) surname of Francisco since it appears to have been either Espailhac, Espeilhac or Espeillac; all of them surnames common around Masclat.) into what is now the Dominican Republic. Notwithstanding this, not every person with that surname is a descendant of him as many of his slaves (but not all) adopted the surname. (Note: This Spanish custom comes directly from the Roman Empire where it was a common practice for freedmen (and persons who obtained the Roman franchise) to assume the name of their former patrons.) Pedro Ignacio Espaillat (1826–1863), a Dominican soldier and cabinetmaker who fought in the Dominican War of Independence, and American politician Adriano Espaillat (born 1954), are descended from former slaves of Francisco Espaillat.

Today, his descendants still have economic influence in the Dominican Republic and are core members of the Dominican elite, especially those descended from his grandson Ulises Espaillat.
