= Masclat =

- Commune
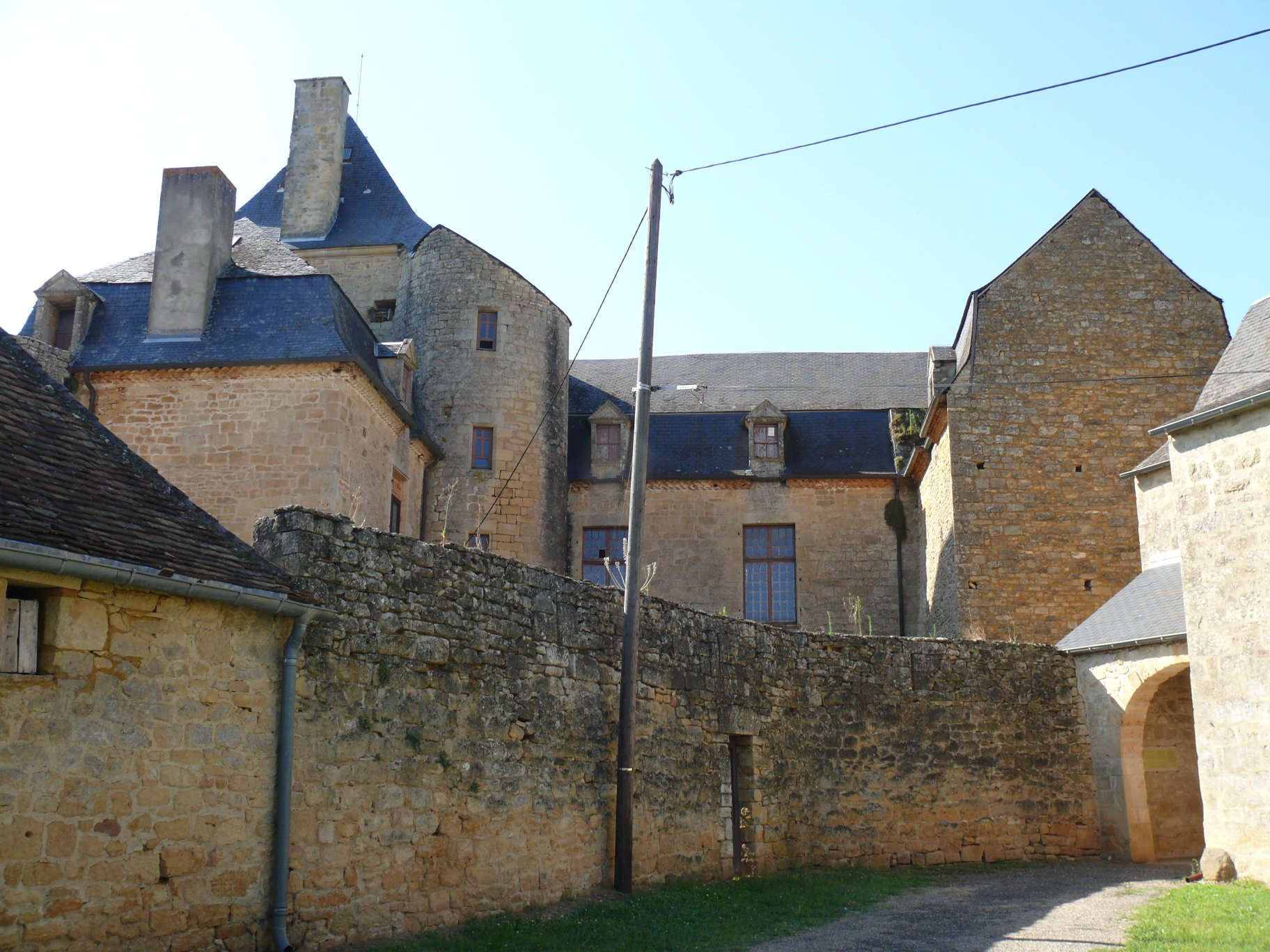
- The chateau in Masclat
- Location of Masclat
- Location within France Location within Occitanie
- Coordinates: 44°50′10″N 1°23′33″E
- Country: France
- Region: Occitania
- Department: Lot
- Arrondissement: Gourdon
- Canton: Souillac

Government
  - Mayor (2020–2026): Monique Boutinaud
- Area^{1}: 10.02 km^{2} (3.87 sq mi)
- Elevation: 183 m (600 ft)
- Highest elevation: 206 m (676 ft)
- Lowest elevation: 112 m (367 ft)
- Population (2023): 357
  - Density: 35.6/km^{2} (92.3/sq mi)
- Time zone: UTC+01:00 (CET)
  - Summer (DST): UTC+02:00 (CEST)
- INSEE/Postal code: 46186 /46350
- ^{1} French Land Register data, which excludes lakes, ponds, glaciers > 1 km^{2} (0.386 sq mi or 247 acres) and river estuaries.

Masclat (French pronunciation: [maskla]) is a commune in the Lot department in south-western France. It has an area of 1,002 ha.

== See also ==
- Communes of the Lot department
