= Juan Isidro Jimenes Grullón =

Dominican essayist, historian and politician (1903–1983)

- Born: Juan Isidro Jimenes Grullón; 17 June 1903; Santo Domingo, Dominican Republic
- Died: 10 August 1983 (aged 80); Santo Domingo, Dominican Republic
- Occupations: Writer, physician, educator

Juan Isidro Jimenes Grullón (June 17, 1903 – August 10, 1983) was a Dominican essayist, historian, physician, philosopher, educator and politician.

== Biography ==
Born to José Manuel Jimenes Domínguez (son of Juan Isidro Jimenes Pereyra and María Josefa de los Santos Domínguez Gómez) and María Filomena Grullón Ricardo. Jimenes completed his primary and secondary education in Santo Domingo, receiving a Bachelor of Arts. He then entered the Faculty of Law at the University of Santo Domingo, but his passion for philosophy made him abandon this course. Pressured by his family, he left for Paris (1923) to study medicine. In 1929 he received his medical degree and returned to Santo Domingo the following year.

In 1934, Jimenes was discovered plotting against the dictator Rafael Leonidas Trujillo and was imprisoned and then exiled in 1935. While in exile, his priority remained to dethrone Trujillo's regime. He lived in Puerto Rico, Venezuela, the United States and Cuba where he remained in exile for twenty-six years while he continued to fight the tyranny of Trujillo. In 1941 while still in Cuba, he and other Dominican exiles on the island, founded the Dominican Revolutionary Party and the Dominican Patriotic Alliance. He participated in the failed expedition of Constanza, Maimon and Estero Hondo in 1959. Six months after Trujillo's assassination he returned to his country and immediately integrated into national policy. In 1962, Jimenes was a candidate for the Presidency with the Social Democratic Alliance party.

He also taught history and sociology at the Autonomous University of Santo Domingo. He published twenty books in the fields of sociology, philosophy, history and literature. His works include the Dominican Republic: a fiction, Pedro Henríquez Ureña : Reality and Myth, Our fake left and the myth of the founding fathers, and polemicist and reflect the rebellious spirit that characterized most of his essay production.

He died in Santo Domingo on August 10, 1983.
