= National School of Visual Arts (Dominican Republic) =

Coordinates: 18°28′27″N 69°53′00″W

National School of Visual Arts (ENAV)
- Escuela Nacional de Artes Visuales
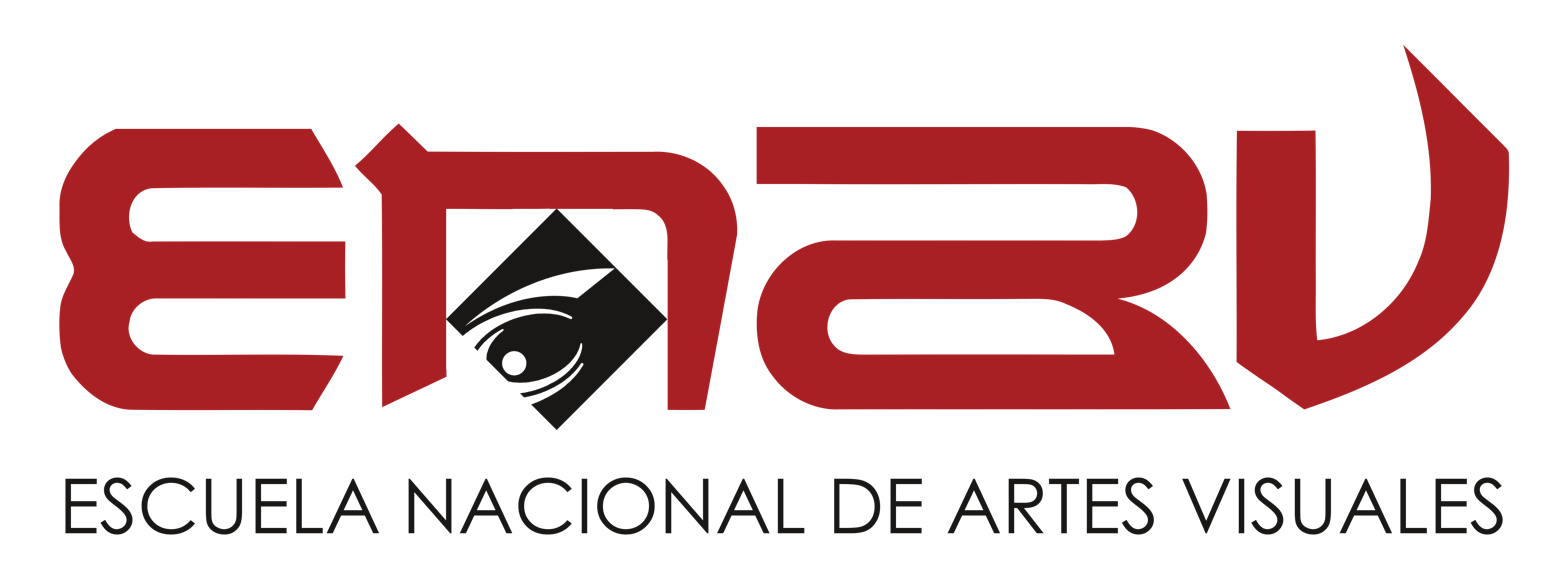
- Established: August 19, 1942
- Director: Iris Pérez
- Campus: Calle El Conde #59, Esq. Isabel La Católica, Ciudad Colonial, Sto. Dgo.
- Website: https://www.facebook.com/enavrd/

National School of Visual Arts (Spanish: Escuela Nacional de Artes Visuales; ENAV) is an institution in the field of visual arts in the Dominican Republic. It was inaugurated on August 19, 1942. It is located in Santo Domingo.

== History ==
During the second half of the 19th century in the Dominican Republic, art education primarily took place in the city of Santo Domingo. Some local or foreign artists such as Luis Desangles and others taught painting and drawing classes during the last two decades of the 19th century, often with government support. In the 20th century, education continued with artists like Abelardo Rodríguez Urdaneta, who taught classes in his studio until he founded his school in 1908, which operated until 1933. In the 1930s and 1940s, many European artists arrived to the Dominican Republic, fleeing the Spanish Civil War and World War II. As a result of the mass emigration of European artists in 1939, the decision was made to create the National School of Fine Arts. During this period, many artists, writers, journalists, correspondent, and mathematics arrived. Among the first teachers of the National School of Visual Arts were the Spanish painter José Gausachs, German painter George Hausdorf, and the Dominican artist Celeste Woss y Gil. Subjects such as drawing, painting, applied arts, sculpture, still life, and costumes were taught. School's first director was the Spanish sculptor Manolo Pascual. The first annual exhibition of School was inaugurated on July 10, 1943.

In 1944, new teachers were appointed, including Maireni Cabral in artistic anatomy and the engineer Pou Ricart as a perspective professor, who was soon replaced by the engineer Amable Frometa. In 1945, Father Roble Toledano was appointed professor of art history. In this year, the first students graduated, including Luz María Castillo, Luis José Álvarez del Monte, Rafael Pina Melero, Gilberto Hernández Ortega, among others.

Over the years, the School has been moved to different locations. Since 1989, the School has been located on Calle El Conde corner Isabel La Católica. The School operates under the Directorate of Fine Arts of the Ministry of Culture and under the supervision of the General Directorate of Fine Arts created by Law 311 of July 19, 1940. This body is responsible for grouping and overseeing the operation of all institutions dedicated to teaching Fine Arts in their different categories and of the Palacio de Bellas Artes in Santo Domingo. At the end of the school year, in the month of July, a joint exhibition of the best works is held. School helps to prepare individual exhibitions to its graduates as a way of presenting themselves to society.

== Directors of the National School of Fine Arts ==
- Manolo Pascual
- José Vela Zanetti
- José Gausachs
- Yoryi Morel
- Celeste Woss y Gil
- Gilberto Hernández Ortega
- Joaquín Priego
- Guillo Pérez
- Joaquín Mordán Ciprián
- Ana Luisa García
- María Aybar
- Marianela Jiménez Reyes
- Rosa Tavárez
- Juan Medina Ramírez
- Manuel Toribio
- Miguel Valenzuela
- Eric Genao Aude
- Mirna Ledesma
- Iris Pérez, since 2020

== Notable teachers ==
- Ada Balcácer
- Cándido Bidó
- Aída Cartagena Portalatín
- Josep Gausachs
- Clara Ledesma
- Jeannette Miller
- Elsa Núñez
- Guillo Pérez
- Rosa Tavarez
- José Vela Zanetti
- Celeste Woss y Gil

== Bibliography ==
- Memoria de la Pintura Dominicana / Danilo de los Santos. TOMOS I, II y III. Santo Domingo: Grupo León Jimenes, 2003.
