= Virgins of Galindo =

The phrase Virgins of Galindo refers to three sisters (aged 7–16) who were slaughtered, and then raped and dismembered by Pedro Cobial, Manuel de la Cruz, and Alejandro Gómez just after the assassination of their father, at the Galindo Manor, located outside the city walls of Santo Domingo, several weeks after the annexation of Santo Domingo by Haiti in 1822.

== Family members ==
The Andújar family was of Canarian descent, and native to Hincha in the Spanish colony of Santo Domingo. After the Haitian invasions of 1801 and 1805 they settled on the outskirts of Santo Domingo.

- Father: Andrés Antonio Andújar de Soto (he was brother-in-law to both President Buenaventura Báez and José de Guzmán y Meléndez, viscount of San Rafael de La Angostura and lord of San Miguel de la Atalaya)

Mother: María Manuela de Lara Pérez (deceased prior 1822)

- "Virgins":
1. Ana María Clemente Andújar de Lara
2. Marcela Andújar de Lara
3. Águeda Andújar de Lara

== References to the slaughter in Dominican literature ==
- Cosas Añejas (Chapter: Las Vírgenes de Galindo), by César Nicolás Penson (1891)
- La Conspiración de los Alcarrizos, by Max Henríquez Ureña (1940)
- Centinela de la Frontera, by Joaquín Balaguer (1962)
- Yania Tierra, by Aída Cartagena Portalatín (1981)
