= El Mirador Azul =

Surrealist group in Puerto Rico

El Mirador Azul (Puerto Rico, 1956) was the only self-proclaimed surrealist group in Puerto Rico. The group included student artists and poets under the guidance of Spanish surrealist Eugenio F. Granell during his tenure (approximately 1950–1958, depending on source) at the University of Puerto Rico in Rio Piedras.

== Origins ==
The group of university students—artists and poets—who would come to make up El Mirador Azul (The Blue Lookout) was meeting informally in a makeshift classroom in the basement of the University of Puerto Rico's main administrative building's tower, where art professor Eugenio Fernández Granell's studio space was located, before the group became known by that name.

The Blue Lookout refers to the space the group rented in 1957 located at #34 Calle Aibonito in Hato Rey. (An announcement for the group's 1957 exhibit in Artes y Letras locates the rented space on Calle Arecibo in Hato Rey.) It was a small apartment above the garage of a house within walking distance of the university, and it was painted blue with a balcony. Eventually, the students began referring to their meeting place as "el mirador" and "el mirador azul." After the group could no longer afford to rent the mirador azul, gatherings were convened at different members' houses but slowly dissipated after members graduated, moved away, and began their careers.

The group, El Mirador Azul, firmly establishes Surrealism as a movement in Puerto Rico. Although the official group was short-lived, a number of its members continued with their artistic endeavors, both privately and publicly. Recent scholarship and exhibits have renewed public interest in the Mirador Azul, its members, and Granell's surrealist influence on the island's literary and artistic sensibilities of the time.

== Members ==
- Roberto "Boquio" Alberty (Guggenheim Fellowship Recipient)
- Juan Cossio
- Frances Del Valle
- Myrna Espada
- Rafael Ferrer (A student of Granell, friend of members of the Mirador Azul, but not a member of the group)
- Nydianna Font
- Gustavo López (Granell's student in the early 1950s who was a friend of Lima and Maysonet, but not a member of the Mirador Azul group)
- Jorge "Lopito" López
- Octavia "Tavin" Maldonado
- José María Lima
- Luis Maysonet Crespo (also Maisonet)
- Carlos Osorio
- Miguel Ángel Ríos
- Julio Rosado Del Valle (Established artist who was highly respected by the group, a friend and mentor)
- Ernesto Jaime Ruiz de la Mata
- Víctor Sánchez

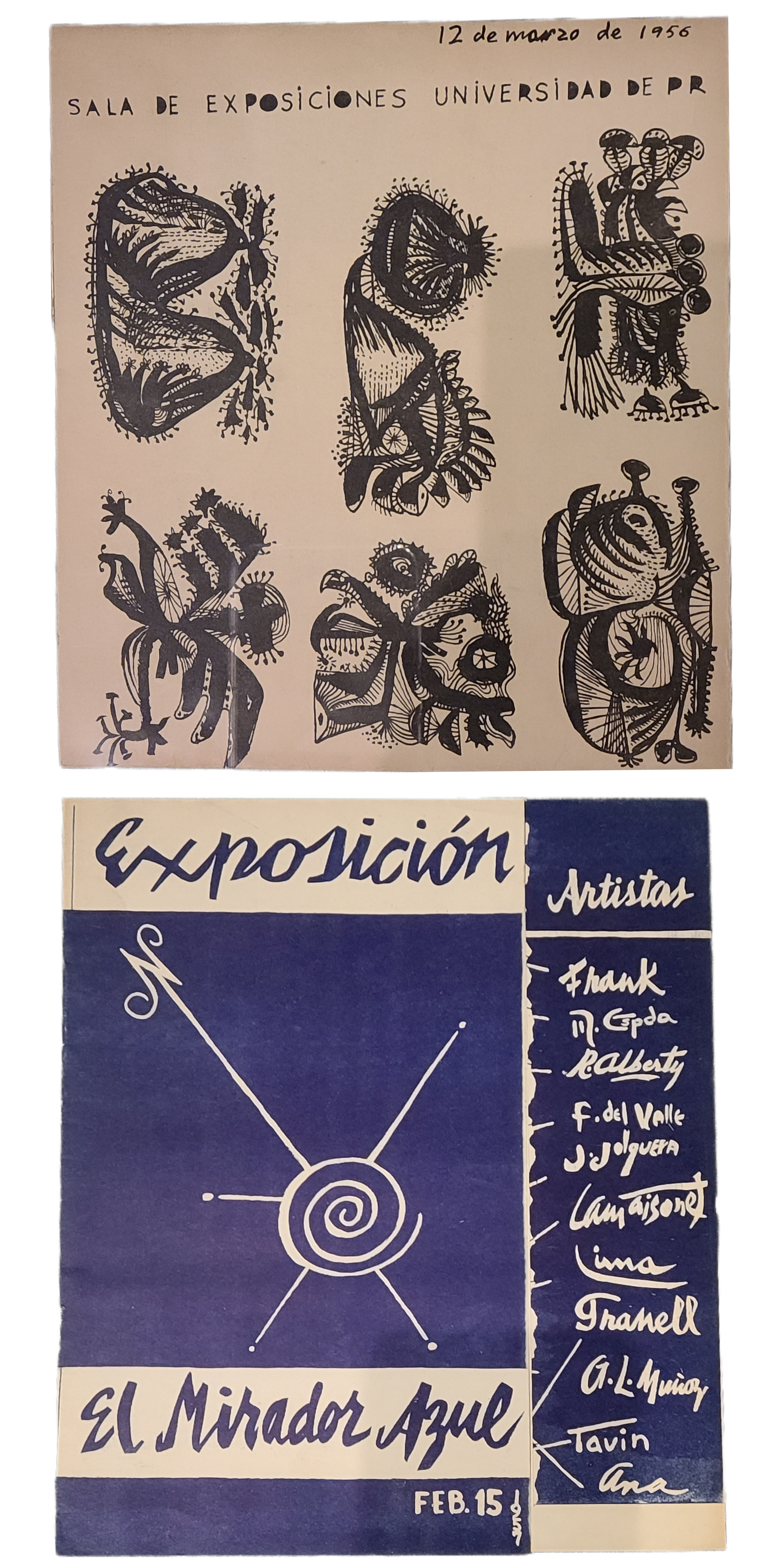
Catalog Covers for El Mirador Azul's 1956 & 1957 Art Expositions

== Exhibitions ==
- (1951) Exposición de la sesión de verano de 1951, Departamento de Bellas Artes, U.P.R. Contributing Artists include: Eugenio Fernádez Granell, Rubén Bras, Hilton Cummings, Pedro Gispert, Gloria Gómez, Félix López, Luis Maisonet (sic), Ethel Ríos, Luz Santos, and Cossette Zeno. (Artist names are in the order in which they were originally listed in the El Mundo announcement.)
- (1956) "16 Pintores Van a Exponer en UPR" sponsored by the UPR Departamento de Humanidades. Contributing artists included: L. M. Maysonet, J. Rosado del Valle, J. Ruiz de la Matta (sic), Víctor Sánchez, Nieves Serrano, J. L. Soya, Virginia Vidich, Cossette Zeno, Otto Néstor Bravo, Gustavo López, Roberto Alberty, Carlos Crespo, Frances del Valle, Rafael Ferrer, E. F. Granell, and José Lima. (Artist names are in the order in which they were originally listed in the El Mundo announcement.)
- (1956) "Inauguran Hoy Exposición UPR". This announcement lists the following artists: Roberto Alberty, Otto Néstor Bravo, Carlos Crespo, Frances del Valle, Rafael Ferrer, Jorge Luis García [not listed on March 1, 1956, announcement], E. F. Granell, José Lima, Gustavo López Muñoz, L. A. Maisonet, Julio Rosado del Valle, J. Ruíz de la Mata, Víctor Sánchez, Nieves Serrano, J. L. Solla, Virginia Vidich y Cossette Zeno. (Artist names are in the order in which they were originally listed in the El Mundo announcement and in the March 12, 1956 exposition catalog.)
- (1957) Exposición de Pintura Surrealista y Moderna held at El Mirador Azul on Calle Arecibo, Hato Rey. Contributing artists included: Frank A. Cepeda, M. Espada, R. Alberty, F. del Valle, J. Jolquera, L. A. Maisonet (sic), Lima, Granell, G. L. Muñoz, Tavin, Ana. (Artist names are in the order in which they were originally listed in the Artes y Letras "Noticias Culturales" section and in the group's Feb. 15, 1957 exposition catalog.)
- (1960) Abstracciones, Solo exhibition by Ruiz de la Mata, February 19 to March 8, Museo de la Universidad, Rio Piedras, Puerto Rico.
- (1961) "Ferrer y Villamil Exponen en UPR," exposition of works by Rafael Ferrer and Rafael Villamil held at the Museo UPR.
- (1963) Exposición de Pinturas, Frances Del Valle's first solo exposition held at the Museo UPR.
- (2014) Camino al Mirador Azul, a retrospective exhibition organized by José Correa Vigier, February 6 to March 14, 2014, Galeria de Art de la Universidad del Sagrado Corazón.
- (2017) Volando chiringa, exhibition by Frances del Valle, July 20 to September 24, 2017, Fundación Eugenio Granell, Santiago de Compostela, Spain.
- (2023) Detrás del Sol: Granell en Puerto Rico, a retrospective exhibition organized by José Correa Vigier, May 25 to September 10, 2023, Fundación Museo Granell, Santiago de Compostela, Spain.
