= Rafael Ferrer (artist) =

Puerto Rican artist

- Born: 1933; Puerto Rico
- Died: 2026 (aged 92–93)
- Education: Syracuse University
- Occupation: Artist

Rafael Ferrer (1933–2026) was a Puerto Rican artist.

He was a 1993 recipient of a Pew Fellowship in the Arts and a 2011 recipient of an Annalee and Barnett Newman Foundation Grant. He is the half-brother of actor José Ferrer and half-uncle of actor Miguel Ferrer.

== Life ==
From an early age, Ferrer traveled between Puerto Rico and the United States, studying in his teens at Staunton Military Academy, and then at Syracuse University from 1951 to 1953. During his years at Staunton, he learned to play drums, which began his involvement with Afro-Cuban music. At Syracuse, fellow students introduced him to the world of art through books, causing a failed attempt to register in the Art Department. During his vacations he would travel to New York City, where he would stay with his half-brother, the Academy Award winner actor, José Ferrer, whom he would accompany to Jazz clubs, meeting many of the musicians who were friends of his brother. He also began to regularly visit the Museum of Modern Art, as well as art galleries.

In the fall of 1953, he returned to Puerto Rico and enrolled at the University of Puerto Rico, Rio Piedras, where he spent one year studying with Eugenio Granell, a surrealist painter and writer who was an exile of the Spanish Civil War. Joining Granell in Paris in 1954, Ferrer became active in a circle of Surrealist artists and intellectuals, where he met André Breton among others. His most important early connection during that time was a friendship with the Cuban artist Wifredo Lam, who gave and dedicated one of his drawings to the young Ferrer.

In 1955, he moved to New York to work as a musician. He was a professional percussionist until 1960, after which he used music as a means of support while he focused more on his work as an artist in his studio. Since the mid-1960s he had exhibitions and gave lectures and seminars across the US, Europe, and the Caribbean.

Neon Corner (1970) at the Baltimore Museum of Art in 2022

Ferrer's success began in the late 1960s through conceptual and process art installations. Initially rooted in action-based pieces like "3 Leaf Pieces" at the Castelli Warehouse, his installations evolved into narrative-driven works featuring elaborate artist-crafted artifacts that suggested voyages. These evocative creations, encompassing recurring themes such as paper bag faces, kayaks, and maps, were showcased at museums worldwide, including the Museum of Modern Art, Whitney Museum of American Art, Corcoran Gallery, Stedelijk Museum, and Museums of Contemporary Art in Philadelphia and Chicago.

Aside from his continuing interest in sculptures made in the studio, Ferrer was commissioned to create permanent sculptures, such as "Puerto Rican Sun" featured in Art in America, March 1980 issue. Fabricated by Lippincott out of steel, it was erected in the South Bronx in 1979. The sculpture depicts the two sides of the Caribbean, light and dark, sun and moon. In 1981, he was commissioned by the Fairmount Park Art Association to make a sculpture for the city of Philadelphia. With the fabricator Bob Giza, he created an aluminum crown which sat on an existing building featuring cutouts of acrobats and performers and words which spelled out its title or marquee: "El Gran Teatro de la Luna", (dismantled, restored and reinstalled on a new open arbor-like base by the city in 2012). In 2002, Ferrer was commissioned by the Government of Puerto Rico to create a permanent sculpture for the waterfront of La Parguera, a village on the southern coast where boats depart for the Phosphorescent Bay. Installed in 2004 and titled "El Museo Rodante" (the rolling museum). It comprises 5 bronze sculptures, cast from wooden templates which contain imagery from artists’ throughout history that Ferrer has admired. The five sculptures have since been moved, reinstalled in Old San Juan.

The mediums Ferrer worked in include sculpture, painting, drawing, printmaking, and installation art. Ferrer taught at several universities: University of Pennsylvania, the Skowhegan School of Painting and Sculpture in Maine, New York's School of Visual Arts, New York, The San Francisco Art Institute, and the University of New Mexico, Albuquerque. Living and working on the North Fork of Long Island after 1999, Ferrer returned to his earlier influences, the visual world used only to spark the imagination. Along with paintings and a multitude of works on paper, including his ongoing series of paper bag faces, he developed a new format which enables him to combine his fascination for both images and words: large blackboard installations. He had a major exhibition at El Museo Del Barrio in 2010 titled Retro/Active from June 8 - August 21, followed by a smaller retrospective at Guild Hall, East Hampton, NY titled "Contraband" from November 5, 2011, to January 16, 2012, and a Survey of Works on Paper 1952–2012 at the Lancaster Museum of Art in Pennsylvania from September 7 - November 11, 2012, both New York and Lancaster with comprehensive catalogues. He was included in the Guggenheim Museum's Latin American exhibition "Under the Same Sun" in 2014, for which the museum purchased the 1973 piece ARTFORHUM. He was represented in New York City by the Adam Baumgold Gallery and Henrique Faria Fine Art. Beginning in 2022 he is also represented by the Fredric Snitzer Gallery located in Miami, FL. A monograph on his work was released in November, 2012 by UCLA Chicano Studies Research Center, A Ver Series, distributed by the University of Minnesota Press.

Ferrer died in 2026.
