= Guillo Pérez =

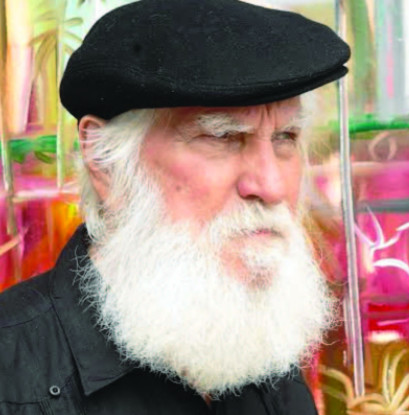
- Born: Guillermo Pérez Chicón; 3 August 1923; Moca, Dominican Republic
- Died: 9 March 2014 (aged 90); Santo Domingo, Dominican Republic
- Education: School of Fine Arts, Santiago de los Caballeros
- Occupation: Painter

Guillo Pérez (birth name Guillermo Pérez Chicon, August 3, 1923 – March 9, 2014) was a Dominican painter who created over seventy exhibitions, and participated in international group exhibitions. He is considered one of the most prolific and important canvas artists of the Dominican Republic.

== Biography ==
Guillo Pérez was son of Francisco Pérez Tavárez and Ana Luisa Chicón Hernández (daughter of Francisco Chicón Wagner and Eulalia Hernández Castro).

During his early years, Guillo Perez studied music, learning to play the violin. He headed to the School of Fine Arts, Santiago, in 1950. In 1952 he was appointed professor and settled in Santo Domingo. He created a series of exhibitions in 1955 both individual and collective.

He also served as president of the Dominican Association of Artists, and was director of the School of Fine Arts in La Vega.

Guillo Pérez died in Santo Domingo on March 9, 2014, due to health complications.

== Style ==
Pérez preferred oil on canvas, and used a spatula to achieve strong fillings. His style was based on abstract expressionism.

== Gallery ==
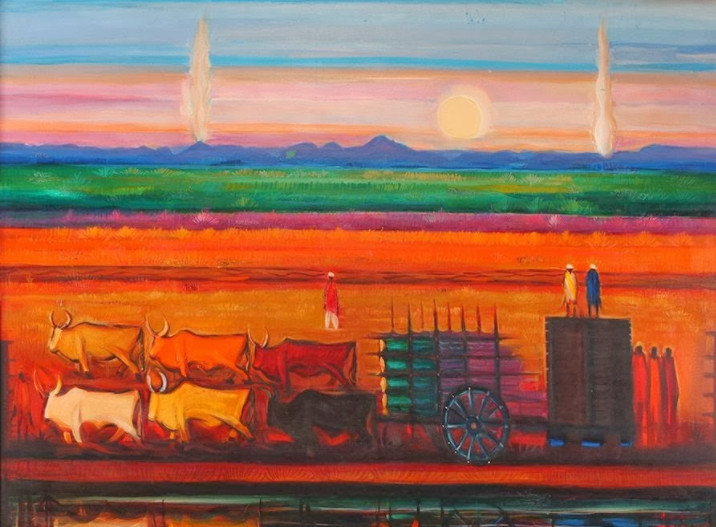
Carretas y Bueyes, 1976 (Colección, Santo Domingo)

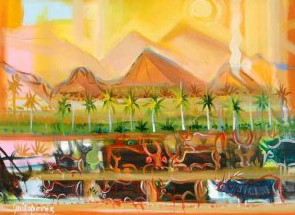
Metamorfosis, 1965 (Colección, Santo Domingo)

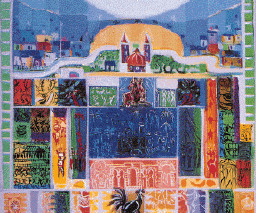
Vision Poetica del Paisaje, (Colección, Santo Domingo)

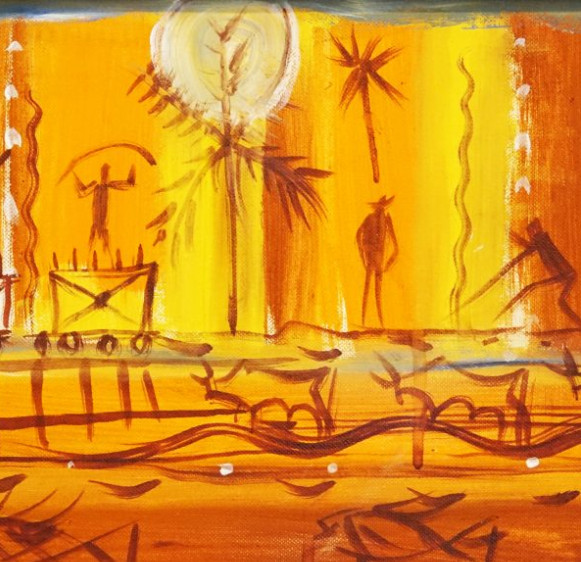
Paisaje Anaranjado, (Colección, Santo Domingo)
