= Freddy Gatón Arce =

Dominican author (1920–1994)

Freddy Gatón Arce (March 27, 1920 – July 22, 1994) was a Dominican writer and poet. He was a lawyer by profession and an important member of the group La Poesía Sorprendida. His lyrical work was firm and had surrealist and mystical influences.

== Life ==
Arce was born on March 27, 1920, in San Pedro de Macorís, Dominican Republic.

In 1943, when he was 23 years old, he was one of the founders and directors of the magazine and editions La Poesía Sorprendida, whose collection had two reprints at his initiative in 1974 and 1988.

He published Vlía, Poetic Anthology of Franklin Mieses Burgos, The Legend of the Girl, Poblana, Magino Quezada, Retreat towards the light, They are wars and loves, 'And with such a long time, The sunset, Common songs, These days of tíbar, In passing and other poems, Looking at the green lizard, The rivers make a voice, Celebrations of Cuatro Vientos, It was like then, Wanderings and Memories, The Sila Cuásar Guerrilla and 'The song of the hetera. He has unpublished The Prince's Coin. In 1962 he was chosen to direct and reorganize the School of Communication at the Autonomous University of Santo Domingo, and in 1966, he was elected Vice Dean of the Faculty of Humanities of the same. He directed the evening paper El Nacional from its management and appearance in September 1966 until July 1974. Since then he has dedicated himself to literary work and collaborates in the Saturday supplement of El Caribe with his section A suerte y Verdad, as well as being part of the ' Editorial Commission of the Central University of the East, ' which in 1984 awarded him the title of 'Honorary Professor of the Faculty of Legal Sciences'.

In 1990, on the occasion of his 70th birthday, several institutions recognized him, including the Autonomous University of Santo Domingo, the Ibero-American University and the Pedro Henríquez Ureña National University; The latter also awarded him, in 1991, the title of 'Honorary Professor' of the Faculty of Humanities and Education. He has participated in cultural and journalistic meetings held in Colombia, Costa Rica, Ecuador, Mexico and Venezuela; and is also a founding member of the 'Latin American Community of Writers', based in Mexico City. He has been a member of the juries of the main literary and journalistic contests in the country, and in 1980 he won the 'National Poetry Prize', this being the only time he has competed in a contest.

His poetic work has been commented on in the country and abroad; the Argentine critic María del Carmen Prosdocimi de Rivera published an extensive study of his poetry, as well as the Cuban Mercedes Santos Moray. It has been said of Gatón Arce that he enriches Dominican journalistic prose. In 1991 he received a plaque of recognition from the Association of Professional Journalists, and in 1992 he was awarded the "Caonabo de Oro Award" by the Dominican Association of Journalists and Writers.

In 1994, he was admitted as a member of the Dominican Academy of Language. Unfortunately, he did not live to give his inaugural speech as he died that same year on July 22 at the age of 74.

== Works ==
He wrote several works, including: Retreat towards the Light, They are wars and loves, The West, Common Songs, These days of Tibar, In passing and other poems, Looking at the green lizard, Celebrations of the four winds, It was like then, Adventures and memories, The song of the Hetera, The Sila Cuasar guerrilla, The Prince's coin, and Furthermore.
