= Eugenio Granell =

Spanish painter (1912–2001)

- Born: 28 November 1912; A Coruña
- Died: 24 October 2001 (aged 88); Madrid
- Monuments: Parque Eugenio Granell, Santiago de Compostela
- Occupations: Artist, Musician, Professor, Political Activist
- Style: Surrealist
- Spouse: Amparo Segarra
- Awards: 'Pablo Iglesias Award for the Arts', 1995; 'Gold Medal of Fine Arts', awarded by the Council of Ministers

Eugenio Fernández Granell (28 November 1912 – 24 October 2001), recognised as the last Spanish surrealist, was an artist, professor, musician and writer.

As a political activist in the early 20th century, Granell was characterised by his outspoken support of democratic socialism and opposition to totalitarianism. Eugenio joined the Trotskyists during his military service and eventually became a prominent member of POUM (Partido Obrero de Unificación Marxista / Worker's Party of Marxist Unification) in 1935.

Following the Civil War, Granell fled to France where he was interned in concentration camps however after having escaped, Eugenio then sought exile in the Americas.

As a surrealist artist, Eugenio's work is principally characterised by its bright and vivid colours that explore nature and the indigenous symbolism of the Americas. His most famous works include Autorretrato (1944), Elegía por Andrés Nin (1991) as well as Crónica de los fiscales de los años horrendos (1986). Granell's work has been incorporated into exhibitions in the Maeght Gallery, the Bodley Gallery, the Museum of Modern Art, and the Museum of Contemporary Art alongside other surrealists such as André Breton and Marcel Duchamp.

Granell also dedicated himself as a poet, essayist and novelist, publishing 15 books in all. Some his first, and most prominent works, include "El hombre verde" (The Green Man, 1944) and Lo que sucedió (What Occurred), a book he illustrated and designed himself which won Mexico's Don Quijote novel prize in 1969. From the mid-1960s until retirement, he was professor of Spanish literature at Brooklyn College.

The Eugenio Granell Foundation was inaugurated in 1995 to conserve the life and work of the artist with an expansive collection of his oils, drawings, constructions, collages and archives. The museum also dedicates itself to the preservation of other surrealists such as Joan Miró, Wifredo Lam, José Caballero, William Copley, Esteban Francés, Marcel Duchamp and Pablo Picasso.

== Early life ==
Born in Galicia, in the city of A Coruña, Eugenio Fernández Granell started out as a musician and political radical. In his youth he and his brother Mario, as well as other friends, set up the magazine SIR (Sociedad Infantil Revolucionaria).

In 1928, Granell enrolled at the Escuela Superior de Música del Real Conservatorio in Madrid. Among his friends were Maruja Mallo, Joaquín Torres García, Alberto Sánchez Pérez, Wifredo Lam and Ricardo Baroja. As a member of the POUM during the Civil War, Eugenio contributed actively to newspapers such as La Nueva Era, La Batalla and El Combatiente Rojo.

In 1939, he went into exile and after arriving in France, he was held in internment camps for several months, but was eventually able to escape to Paris. While in the French capital, he continued the friendships with Benjamin Péret and Wifredo Lam which had started in Madrid prior to the civil war. Granell's affiliation with Trotsky made him the enemy of fascists and Stalinists and steered him towards a life marked by exile and escape. As María Zambrano stated regarding Spain in the early twentieth century, the country was a "master of dispersal and wastefulness" as it forced many of its most outstanding artists and intellectuals into a painful flight to other countries. Granell was one of those exiles, residing in France, the Dominican Republic, Puerto Rico, Guatemala and New York City. In the Dominican Republic, he was in the company of other Spanish exiles, including artists José Vela Zanetti and Josep Gausachs and writers like Vlady Serge, Segundo Serrano Poncela, and Vicente Llorens.

Granell began his life as a painter in the Dominican Republic. He also continued to play the violin at the National Symphony which he had helped create with the musician Enrique Chapí, another refugee from Spain. When André Breton arrived in the island for a short visit, he liked Granell's paintings and encouraged him to continue. Breton also admired the magazine which Granell, Alberto Baeza Flores (a politician from Chile) and several Dominican writers had created: "La Poesía Sorprendida". Granell left an important legacy in the arts in this Caribbean island.

== The Dominican Republic ==
When Granell arrived in the Dominican Republic in 1940, he had not yet discovered his talent for painting. Initially he worked as a violinist with the National Symphony Orchestra, which he helped organize with the musician Casal Chapí and as a journalist for the newspaper La Nación. In 1941 he began painting, participating in an exhibit entitled Private Exhibit of Modern Spanish Painters in 1942. Granell had his first solo exhibition in 1943, exhibiting 44 surrealist paintings, this was the first exhibition of surrealist works held in the country.

He had another solo exhibition in 1945 featuring 200 of his works and in 1946 he exhibited in Puerto Rico and Guatemala. Later that same year, he left the Dominican Republic due to problems that arose when he refused to sign a document supporting the dictator Trujillo.

Granell, along with Dominican poets and Chilean diplomat Alberto Baeza Flores, formed an avant-garde magazine and literary movement, La Poesía Sorpendida.

== Guatemala and Puerto Rico ==
In 1946, Granell left the Dominican Republic and headed for Mexico with the intention of working with his party comrade Costa Amic. During a stopover in Guatemala, however, Granell and his wife Amparo liked Guatemala City and decided to stay. Once there, he became an art professor, contributed to magazines, and hosted a radio show in which he discussed art and artists, among other subjects, all while continuing to paint and write. Granell's endeavors in Guatemala were soon interrupted as tensions during the Guatemalan Revolution escalated after the 1948 parliamentary election, leading to an attempted military coup in 1949. Granell's political views made him a target of violence, forcing him to flee in the middle of the night.

Jaime Benítez, the Rector of the University of Puerto Rico, had met Granell when he had shown his art on the island a few years earlier and invited him and his family to move to Puerto Rico and become an art professor at the university. His stay on the island was very productive. It was during this time that he published his short book Isla cofre mítico (Island Mythical Coffer, 1951) that he modeled after André Breton's book Martinique: Charmeuse de serpents. He ignited interest in contemporary art in his students, many of whom would continue to paint and gather to form an artistic group that they referred to as "El Mirador Azul." As he did in the Dominican Republic, Granell's endeavors at the University of Puerto Rico established a strong school of art on the island that would continue to thrive after his departure.

== New York ==
In 1952, Granell traveled to New York with his friend José Vela Zanetti, a fellow Spanish exile whom he met in the Dominican Republic. Once there, through Vela Zanetti, he met and developed a strong friendship with Marcel Duchamp. In 1957, after a sabbatical, Granell and his family moved to New York and lived mainly on the Upper West Side of Manhattan, New York, until 1985 when the Granell family returned to Spain.

It was here that Granell held several exhibits at the Bodley Gallery; some were solo shows, others were group shows with surrealists like René Magritte, Max Ernst, and Duchamp. He also provided a new introduction to the 1979 reissue of the 1937 book Red Spanish Notebook: the first six months of revolution and the civil war, written by Juan Ramón Breá and Mary Stanley Low.

He studied sociology at the New School for Social Research and earned his PhD with the publication of a very personal study of Picasso's Guernica: "Picasso's Guernica. The End of a Spanish Era" (UMI Research Press, 1967 and 1981). Granell was professor emeritus of Spanish Literature at City University of New York (CUNY), where he worked at Brooklyn College.

== Return to Spain ==
In 1985, Granell returned to Spain, where he was awarded numerous prizes and acknowledgements such as the 'Gold Medal of Fine Arts', awarded by the Council of Ministers as well as the 'Pablo Iglesias Award for the Arts' in 1995.

The Eugenio Granell Foundation was created in 1995 in his home town Santiago de Compostela, Spain. The only museum in the world entirely devoted to surrealism which holds some 600 of his paintings along with works by Picabia, Duchamp, Man Ray, Joan Miró, Esteban Francés, and Philip West among many others.

Granell also published new editions of several books in Spain, including "La novela del Indio Tupinamba", a surrealist, personal and unique vision of the Spanish Civil War. It has since been translated into English and published by City Lights.

Another important re-publication was the 1996 facsimile reproduction of Isla cofre mítico with a prologue by Fernando Castro Flórez. Granell dedicated Isla to André Breton and his wife Elise whom he had met in the Dominican Republic in 1941. Granell was unwavering in his friendship with Breton and in his dedication to the surrealist ideals that Breton espoused. Recent scholarship asserts that Isla cofre mítico is not only a result of that friendship but also an example of Granell's adherence to the surrealist philosophical ideal of total liberation, especially the liberation of poetry and artistic creation.

The Eugenio Granell Foundation was created in Santiago de Compostela in 1995. Situated in Plaza del Toral in the historic centre, Granell donated many of his own works (oils, drawings, constructions, found objects), as well as his collection of works by other surrealist artists. His Library and archives are also found in the Foundation.

Granell died in Madrid in 2001.

An important part of his personal archive is located in the Pavelló de la República CRAI Library - University of Barcelona and consists of press clippings about Spanish Civil War, Exile, Francoism, POUM, and cultural activities. But most of his archives can be found at the Eugenio Granell Foundation.

== Works ==
Although springing from the depths of his subconscious like that of all the surrealists, Granell's work is influenced by the places where he lived, particularly the exuberance of the Caribbean and the blend of Spanish and native cultures. Surrealism recognises no social function of art other than that of liberating the individual and society from the repression of reason, allowing the creator to express his instincts and dreams. In 1959, André Breton organized an exhibit called The Homage to Surrealism Exhibition to celebrate the fortieth anniversary of surrealism which exhibited works by Salvador Dalí, Joan Miró, Enrique Tábara and Eugenio Granell.

Granell's, Formation of Metaforia, Oil on Cardboard, 1975.

Granell's work is characterized by Surrealist themes, often featuring hybrid figures where organic and human forms merge through metamorphosis. His compositions frequently utilize bold colors and sculptural arrangements of human figures. Playfulness and a rejection of traditional logic are recurring elements in his paintings, sculptures, and readymades, reflecting his alignment with Surrealist principles.

The major books on Granell and his work, such as monographs and catalogues, are mostly in Spanish or Galician, but they are widely available in libraries throughout the world, including the United States. All of the catalogues of Granell's exhibits published by the Fundación Granell, are also written in English. Granell also published a book of meditations and critical reflections on Picasso's Guernica, and this book is available in English as well as in Spanish and Galician (see "References" section).

Works by Granell are on display in major museums, including the Museum of Modern Art in New York and the Reina Sofía Museum in Madrid.

== Films ==
At the beginning of the 1960s, Eugenio Granell filmed a series of experimental films in 8mm and wrote some surrealistic film scripts. They were made public in 2003, after the publication of Alberte Pagán's book Imaxes do soño en liberdade. O cinema de Eugenio Granell. His films are divided into two fields: on the one hand, he made photographed films, which range from the surrealist narration of Película hecha en casa con pelota y muñeca (1962) to pure cinema; and on the other, some abstract films, not photographed, in which the artist directly manipulated the film strip and its emulsion. Trompos (1961) and Middlebury (1962) are examples of pure, non-narrative cinema. In the first one, some spinning tops, which Marcel Duchamp had given to Granell, move on the screen, in overhead shots, playing with the space between the field and the off-field. Middlebury consists of two reels where a meeting in the countryside was filmed twice, so all footage is superimposed. Casa (1963) is a short piece that portrays the interior space of the artist's home.

The abstract films are Invierno (1960), Lluvia (1961) and Dibujo (1961). The first and the last are painted directly on the celluloid; Lluvia, on the other hand, creates its images by scratching the photographic emulsion.

== The literature of Eugenio Granell ==
Eugenio Granell published three novels in Mexico. La novela del Indio Tupinamba (1959) is a "political satire" and allegory of the Spanish Civil War; El clavo (1967) is a "dystopia" and Lo que succedió... (1968), winner of the 1967 Don Quixote prize, is a "social chronicle". La novela del Indio Tupinamba was translated into English as The Novel of the Tupinamba Indian by David Coulter (City Lights Publishers, 2018).

== Filmography ==
- Invierno (1960)
- Lluvia (1961)
- Dibujo (1961)
- Trompos (1961)
- Middlebury (1962)
- Película hecha en casa con pelota y muñeca (1962)
- Casa (1963)

== Film scripts ==
- La bola negra (early 1950s)
- El arte de pintar es un antiguo compañero del ser humano (1958)
- Nuevas aventuras del Indio Tupinamba en la República Occidental del Carajá (cowritten with José Luis Egea, late 1980s)

== Bibliography ==
=== Works in English translation ===
- Picasso's Guernica: the end of a Spanish era. Ann Arbor, Mich.: UMI Research Press, 1967, 1981. ISBN 978-0-8357-1206-4
- The Novel of the Tupinamba Indian, trans. David Coulter. San Francisco, California: City Lights Books, 2018. ISBN 9780872867758
- Eugenio Fernández Granell; César Antonio Molina, Eugenio Granell. A Coruña: Diputación Provincial de A Coruña, 1994. ISBN 9788486040857

=== Published works ===
==== Granell, Eugenio Fernández ====
- "El Hombre Verde," 1944.
- Arte y Artistas en Guatemala, El Libro de Guatemala, 1949.
- Isla cofre mítico, Editorial Caribe, Puerto Rico, 1951
- La Novela del Indio Tupinaba, Costa-Amic, México, 1959.
- El Clavo, La Novela Popular, 1967.
- Lo que sucedió...., España Errante, México, 1968.
- Federica no era tonta y otros Cuentos, Costa-Amic editor, México 1970. (See also Colección Algorán reprint, 1993.)
- La Leyenda de Lorca y otros Escritos, 1973.
- Así que pasen cinco años. Amor de D. Perlimplin con Belisa en su Jardin, Taurus, 1976, 1981.
- Estela de Presagios, Poemas; Ilustraciones: LUdwig Zeller, Oasis ed., Canada, 1981.
- Ile, coffre mythique, trans. Paul Aubert, Les Iles Fortunées, 1993.
- La chambre noire, Les Iles Fortunées, 1994.
- A l'aéroport, Les Iles Fortunées, 1996.
- Ensayos, encuentros e invenciones, Edición y Prólogo de CA Molina, La Rama Dorada, Huerga & Fierro, 1998.
- El aire fresco de Eugenio F. Granell, Introducción de Isabel Castells, Fundación Eugenio Granell, 2000.
- Breves encuentros con Granell, Renfe, 2000.
- El Guernica de Picasso. El final de una era española, Fundación Picasso, Málaga, 2002.
- Memorias de Compsotela. Visión orlada por estrellas, islas, árboles y antorchas, Fundación Eugenio Granell, 2006.
- Historias de un cuadro, Fundación Eugenio Granell, 2007.
- "Congreso interdisciplinar Eugenio Granell", "Actas", Fundación Eugenio Granell con más apoyos, 2007.
- Lo que sucedió..., Introducción: Arturo Casas, Fundación Eugenio Granell, 2007.
- "El rito mecánico del pájaro Pí", Fundación Eugenio Granell, 2008.
- "Correspondencia con sus cxamaradas del P.O.U.M.(1939-1999), Fundación Granell, Santiago, 2009.
- "Escritos políticos (1932-1990)", Introducción: Pello Erdoziain (Fundación A. Nin), Fundación Granell, 2009.
- Correspondencia con Rubia Barcia. Alams gemelas (1940-1993), Fundación Granell, 2011.
- "Federica no era tonta", Prólogo: Claudio Rodríguez Fer, AUGA editora,2012.
- Arte y artistas en Guatemala, Olllero y Ramos, Madrid, 2012.
- Coincidencias. Poesía completa, Edición y Prólogo: Oscar Ayala, Huerga & Fierro, Madrid.

==== Granell, Eugenio Fernández and ====
- Carlos Arias, Eugenio Granell, Xunta de Galicia, 2005. Biografía en gallego.
- Carlos Arias, Un hereje contemporáneo, Fundación Eugenio Granell, 2017. Diseño y maquetación Teresa Taboada. Biografía en español.
- Juan Manuel Bonet, Emmanuel Guigon, Fernando Castro, Jean Marcel, Edouard Jaguer, Jean Schuster, Martica Sawin, Susanne Klengel, Lourdes Andrade, André Coyné, Marceline Pleynet, Belinda Rathbone, José Pierre. El Surrealismo entre Viejo y Nuevo Mundo, 1989.
- Juan Ramón Jiménez, Fernando Castro Flórez. Isla Cofre Mítico, 1996.
- W. Solano, Pelai Pagès i Blanch, E. Castro, MD Genovés, P. Erdociain, D. Pereira. Eugenio Granell, Militante del POUM, Fundación Eugenio Granell, 2007-2008. Textos en gallego e inglés.
- et al., Lembranzas e Reflexións de Eugenio Granell, Unha crónica audiovisual de Xan Leira; fotografías de J.L. Abalo, Memoria Viva, 2007.
- et al., "2012. Centenario Eugenio Granell", "Nuevas perspectivas de la obra de Granell y de Amparo", "Espacios Expositivos", "Textos personales", "Traducciones", Fundación Eugenio Granell, con muchos apoyos, 2012.

=== Catalogues ===
- "Eugenio Fernández Granell", Galería Nacional de Bellas artes, Ciudad Trujillo, 1943.
- "Pinturas de Eugenio F. Granell", Sala de Exposiciones de la Universidad", Puerto Rico, 1946.
- "Granell", 52 óleos, La Universidad Popular, Oficina de Turismo de Guatemala, 1947.
- "Granell. Pinturas", Escuela de Artes Plkásticas, Guatemala, 1949.
- S. Arbós Ballesté, "Eugenio Granell. Un surrealista español en Nueva York", Ateneo de Madrid, Sala de Santa Catalina, 1974.
- "Eugenio Granell. Un surrealista español en Nueva York", Dintel, Galería de Arte, 1975.
- VVAA, "E. Granell", Galería Valle Ortí, Valencia, 1975.
- "Eugenio Granell", Galería Altex, Madrid, 1976.
- "A Exposicão "Phases" em Portugal", Junta de Turismo da Costa Do Sol, Novembro, 1977.
- "Eugenio Granell", Galería de Arte Moderno, Santo Domingo, R.D., Septiembre, 1981. Texto Santiago Arbós Ballestéç.
- Carlos E. Pinto, "Eugenio F. Granell", Sala de Arte y Cultura, Caja de Ahorros, Canarias, 1984.
- Carlos Areán, "Eugenio F. Granell", Museo Municipal de Bellas Artes de Santander, Julio 1986.
- J. M. Bonet, E. Granell, "Eugenio F. Granell. Exposición antológica", Caja de Ahorros, Municipal de Vigo, 1987.
- A. M. Campoy, "Eugenio F. Granell. Pinturas, 1980-1988", Galería Heller, 1988.
- J. M Bonet, A. Breton, B. Péret, M. Duchamp, "E. Granell", Fundación Cultural Mapfre Vida, Madrid, 1989.
- J. M. Bonet, E. Guigon, "Eugenio F. Granell. Islas y Brasas", Museo de Teruel, 1990.
- B. Péret, H. T. Flemming, "Eugenio F. Granell", Galería Thomas Levy, Hamburg, 1990.
- E. Jaguer, J. Pierre, H. T. Flemming, R. Santos Torroella, C. A. Molina, J. M. Bonet, "Eugenio Granell. Exposición antológica. 1940-1990", Comunidad de Madrid, 1990–1991.
- L. Ishi-Kawa, "Eugenio Granell", Arte y Tecnología, 1992–1993.
- F. Castro Flórez, "Eugenio F. Granell, Encantador de serpientes", Antiguo Convento de las Carmelitas, Cuenca, 1993.
- J. M. Bonet, F. Castro Flórez, J. Navarro de Zuvillaga, P. Jiménez, J. Armida Sotillo, E. Granell, "Eugenio Granell", Auditorio de Galicia, Santiago de Compostela, 1993.
- C. A. Molina, R. Santos Torroella, J. M. Bonet, F. Castro Flórez, E. Jaguer, J. H. Matthews, M. Cesariny, H. T. Flemming, P. Jiménez, S. Sanz Villanueva, J. Navarro de Zuvillaga, A. Ramoneda, J. Ruiz, A. Santamarina, T. Marco, J. Maestro, P. López-Barxas, "Eugenio Granell", #3, Colección Grandes Pintores, Ed. de César Antonio Molina, Diputación ProvinciaL De a Coruña, 1994.
- Mracos-Ricardo Barnatán, "Encuentros del espírit, La Kábala, Madrid, 1994.
- J. Ruiz Sierra, J. Pierre, L. Mombiedro, J. M. Parreño, "Colección Eugenio Granell", Consorcio de Santiago. 1995. Primeros fondos de la Fundación Eugenio Granell.
- Emmanuel Guigon, "Eugenio Granell. Inventario del planeta", Fundación Eugenio Granell, 1995; Ayuntamiento de Pamplona, 1996.
- E. Aguirre, R. Pérez Estrada, J. Vela Zanetti, J. I. Serra, J. A. Santos Pastrana, A. Rodríguez Abad, A. Alonso Ares, "A Eugenio Granell", Fundación Vela Zanetti, León, 1996.
- Varios Autores, "Granell en Puerto Rico (1950-1957)", Fondos de la Fundación, 1997.
- J. Navarro de Zuvillaga, "Eugenio Granell y el teatro", Fundación Eugenio Granell, 1997.
- "Eugenio Granell", Galería Prsenca, 1997.
- Gonzalo Armero, Eugenio Granell", Huerta de San Vicente, Granada, 1999–2000.
- X. Antón Castro, "Eugenio Granell. Xeografía dun surrealista", Sala de Gagos de Mendoza, Pontevedra, 1999.
- José Medina, "Juego de sugerencias, Granell y la arquitectura", Fundación Eugenio Granell, 1999.
- Javier Herrera, "Eugenio Granell. El elixir del alquimista", Fundación Eugenio Granell, 2000.
- A. Garrido Moreno, "Coleccionistas. E. Granell en las colecciones gallegas", Fundación E. Granell, 2001.
- Francesc Miralles, Antología. Eugenio Granell. pintura, escultura, objects, Fundación Caixaterrassa, 2001.
- M. Patinha, "É na linha do Horizonte que está o Infinito. Eugenio Granell. Cruzweiro Seixas", Galería Sacramento, Aveiro, Portugal, 2001.
- Antón Castro, B. Pinto de Almeida, V. Oisteanu, R. Tío Bellido, "Granell El arte de la conversación", Instituto Cervantes, varios países y ciudades, 2002–2003.
- Mercedes Rozas, X. L. Axeitos, X. Estévz, E. Ruibal, "Imágenes de la memoria", Fundación E. Granell, 2002.
- J. Herrera, "Los paisajes mágicos de Granell", Fundación Picasso, Málaga, 2002.
- "Exposición-Homenaxe, Eugenio F. Granell, 1912-2001. O compromiso Social e Politico dun Surrealista", Salas Castelao e Anxel Casal, Galería Sargadelos, 2002.
- J. M. Naharro-Calderón, E. Granell, L. Klich, "1912 Eugenio Granell 2001", Galería Guillermo de Osmna, Madrid, Barcelona, Badajoz, 2003.
- J. Ruiz, "Eugenio Granell. El antropólogo de su memoria", Sala de Cultura Castillo de Maya, Fundación Caja Navarra, 2003.
- A. Pagán, "Imaxes do soño en liberdade. O cinema de Eugenio Granell", Xunta de Galicia, 2003. Exposición en la sede de la Fundación E. Granell.
- J. Ruiz, H. T. Fleming, Pablo Jiménez, "Oleos, construcciones y objetos", Fundación E. Granell, 2003. Fondos de la fundación.
- Bonet, Juan Manuel, "Eugenio Fernández Granell", Comisario: Aurelo Torrente Larrosa. Arte español para el extranjero, Ministerio de Asuntos Exteriores, Madrid, 2003.
- L. García de Carpi, "La imagen de la mujer en la obra de Eugenio Granell", Fundación E. Granell, 2004; Caja Segovia, 2005; Fundación Rafael Boti, Córdoba, 2005.
- "Retrato de una amistad: Granell y Vela Zanetti", Fundación Eugenio Granell, 2005.
- P. E. Cuadrado, A. Goncalves, R. Padin Otero, N. Fernández Segarra, "Cartografía surrealista. Território Eugenio Granell", Fundación Cupertino de Miranda, Famalicao, Portugal, 2006.
- M. A. Ramos, J-F, Alvarez Prieto, Javier Ruiz, F. Castro Flórez, E. Guigon, "Dibujos y collages de Eugenio Granell", Fundación E. Granell, 2007. Fondos de la Fundación.
- J. Herrera, "Eclosión Mágica, 1956-1967", Feima, Fundación de Arte Gallego, Madrid, 2007.
- E. Castro, "El pájaro Pí y la lengua de los pájaros, Fundación E. Granell, 2008.
- "E. Granell", Sala Dalmau, Barcelona, 2011.
- J. M. Bonet, N. Fernández Segarra, "La Biblioteca de Eugenio Granell", Fundación E. Granell, 2012.
- E. Valiña, A. Pagán, A. Pinent, "Eugenio Granell e o cine. Unha película de vinte minutos", CGAC, Xunta de Galicia, 2012.
- L. Rodríguez Rodríguez, "Azares de Granell en zinc y papel", Fundación E. Granell, 2013; catálogo/cuaderno.
- Javier del Campo, El surrealismo como arte. Granell. El surrealismo como vida", Caja de Burgos, 2015.
- Javier Arnaldo; "Eugenio Granell y Esteban Vicente, Construcciones y Toys", Museo Esteban Vicente y Fundación Granell, 2017 y 2018.
