= La Poesía Sorprendida =

La Poesía Sorprendida (Spanish for “Surprised poetry”) was a Dominican literary movement and avant-garde journal that existed from October 1943 to May 1947. Rebelling from the nationalism and realism that prevailed in Dominican poetry at the time, the sorprendistas sought to cultivate a universal poetics that explored the psyche and soul in surrealistic ways. The most well-known sorprendistas whose works were published in the journal include Franklin Mieses Burgos, Aida Cartagena Portalatin, Mariano Lebron Savinon, Manuel Rueda, Freddy Gatón Arce, Antonio Fernandez Spencer, Rafael Americo Henriquez, Manuel Valerio, Manuel Llanes, Juan Manuel Glass Mejia, Chilean Alberto Baeza Flores, and Spaniard Eugenio Fernandez Granell.

Adamantly anti-fascist and surrealistic since its first issue, thirteen years after Rafael Trujillo assumed complete control of the country, the journal was one of the only publications that challenged and rejected the oppressive regime's ideology. Today, many Dominican literary critics and intellectuals consider La Poesía Sorprendida to be not only the most significant movement in the nation's literary canon, but the poetic peak of Dominican literature as of late.

== Dominican Literary History ==
Since the founding times of Santo Domingo and its colonial literature, literary creation in the Dominican Republic, as well as everywhere else in Latin America, reflected the trends in Europe, especially in Spain: from the conceptism and gongorism of the Golden Age to movements and trends such as the baroque, the neoclassical or rationalism, and later, romanticism, Parnassianism and symbolism.

It wasn't until the emergence of Modernismo and the unique figure of Rubén Darío in the late nineteenth century that the vector of impact and influence changed direction, now going from America to Europe. During this era, Dominican poets moved away from Romanticism and Naturalism towards Modernism, which became the intellectual state at the turn of the century, with Tulio Manuel Cestero recognized as the country's “propagandist for modernism,” according to the literary critic Néstor Contín Aybar

Though it was the twentieth century that first saw the autochthonous literary movements of Dominican Republic, with Vedrinismo (1912), Postumismo (1921), and LPS (1943), named after the journal where the sorprendistas published most of their work.

== La Poesía Sorprendida journal ==
The journal's first issue came out in October 1943. The editors of the journal Franklin Mieses Burgos, Mariano Lebrón Saviñón, Freddy Gatón Arce, Alberto Baeza Flores, and Eugenio Granell defined the movement in primarily surrealist terms and published many of the major modernists of the period. The journal also featured the drawings of Granell, a Spanish surrealist and left-wing exile from fascist Spain. LPS published a total of 21 editions (at 500 copies per edition), as well as 14 books of poetry, including some of the most important works of 20th century Dominican literature, such as Sin mundo ya y herido por el cielo (1944) and Clima de eternidad (1944), by Franklin Mieses Burgos; Víspera del sueño: Poemas para un atardecer (1944), by Aída Cartagena Portalatín; Vlía (1944), by Freddy Gatón Arce; Vendaval interior (1944), by Antonio Fernández Spencer, and Rosa de tierra (1944), by Rafael Américo Henríquez . In its time, writers from Latin American, Europe, and the United States recognized LPS as an important literary movement. André Breton, who visited the sorprendistas on two separate trips to the Dominican Republic hailed the literary movement's journal as possessing the most “noble quality” of all journals published in Latin America. Yet LPS's greatest significance resides in its attempt to rescue the Dominican imagination from the ideological confines of Trujillo's dictatorship. By necessity, the sorprendistas’ project was clandestine, and they found in surrealist literary techniques and forms a means to evade the cultural censors of the time.

In the February 1944 issue commemorating the Dominican Republic's first centennial, the only issue in which the editors buckle under political pressure to “salute” Trujillo, it proclaims the sorprendistas’ hope for “the creation of a world more beautiful, more free and more deep.” They published progressive writers from Argentina, Brazil, China, Columbia, Costa Rica, Cuba, Chile, Ecuador, Egypt, El Salvador, England, France, Germany, Guatemala, Haiti, Ireland, Italy, Nicaragua, Peru, Puerto Rico, Spain, Turkey, Uruguay, and the U.S. As one may imagine, they published a good number of the French surrealist and modernist writers, such as Breton, Paul Eluard, Robert Desnos, Antonin Artaud, and André Gide. They also published major writers such as William Blake, Horace Gregory, Jorge Cáceres, Jorge Guillén, Francisco Matos Paoli, Charles Henri Ford, Archibald McLeisch, Jules Supervielle, Li Po, Tufu, Jorge Carrera Andrade, Hart Crane, Stephen Spender, Ramón Guirao, José Lezama Lima, C. Day-Lewis, and James Joyce.

While the journal concerned itself more with literary quality than progressive politics, it is undeniable that the sorprendistas were guided by their political sympathies. In the first issue appears a selection of William Blake's “Milton,” a poem in which Blake criticizes (among other things) capitalist industrialization as “dark Satanic mills” and expresses his desire to fight “Till we have built Jerusalem / In England’s green and pleasant land.” It is also significant that the journal published Haitian poets in the centennial issue that commemorated the establishment of the Dominican Republic as a republic independent of Haiti, which had occupied the country from 1809 to 1843.

Once the sorprendistas realized that their excursions into the inner world did nothing to enrich public life, they lost their impetus to go on. In his essay “Poeta y Soledad,” published in the final issue of La poesía sorprendida, Antonio Fernandez Spencer angrily expresses this loss of confidence in the movement. Fernandez Spencer's essay comes at a time when the regime solidified its power by cracking down on dissident movements and organizations after a brief period of political liberalization in 1946. His essay can be read as a kind of parting shot at the Trujillo regime and the capitalist world order in general for having neglected the interior life of human beings and the poets who extend and defend such interiority.

== Characteristics ==
“Necesitamos de ella (la poesía) en un planeta sordo, para que ella sea la estrella de la sorpresa y lo inesperado de su luz. La poesía, es entonces un arma, menos evidente, gráfica o corpórea, pero con una fuerza capaz de desbaratar esas mismas armas reales: porque sigue siendo la apetencia del hombre de un mundo de belleza y de verdad interior; de una pasión íntima, callada, subterránea, decidora de fuego y su verdad; sigue, la poesía, hoy como ayer, con su desnudez y su reino pero también con esa verdad de hombre adentro en entrañas, que ella busca, a poco que nos internamos en ella.” (LPS, I: 1943)

To understand the aim of the sorprendistas, it is important to remember that the country was already submerged in Trujillo's dictatorship by its founding. Anti-Trujillo from its outset, LPS proposed "a national poetry that was nourished by the universal, a poetry without limits, and poetry for the universal man.” Its objective focused on strengthening a national poetry "nurtured" in universal poetry, in search of solitude, mystery, intimacy and the secret of the human being as a creative entity. For the sorprendistas, interior life as realm of imagination constituted a kind of free zone in the otherwise totalitarian social space of the island of La Hispaniola. The surprise or shock generated from manifesting poetically an unfettered inner psychic life had the potential to dislodge the minds of the colonized from an adherence to an oppressive regulation of life under the neocolonial dictatorship.

LPS can rightly be understood as part of the broad European and Caribbean surrealist movement that, in an era of colonialism and fascism, found in art a refuge they hoped would become a home. In other words, the sorprendistas do not in any way call for an art-for-art's sake that revels in a Kantian notion of the beautiful. Beauty, for them, should shock or awaken the reader from an ideological stupor that accepts the way things are, the so-called “facts.” It is fitting, then, that in a letter to the editors of LPS, a Cuban poet, Emilio Ballagas, claimed that there could not be a better title for their journal to save them from “la poesía acostumbrada” or a customary and accommodationist poetry. Poetic beauty, or rather, the ability of poetry to shock the reader into recognizing beauty would, ideally, throw into relief its opposite, abject oppression. A characteristic feature of this poetic movement was the search within the individual, the exploration of the psyche and the soul, in order to explain and reflect in its figurative language the hardships of our society and the darkness of the world.
