= Aída Cartagena Portalatín =

Dominican poet

- Born: Aída Cartagena Portalatín; June 18, 1918; Moca, Espaillat, Dominican Republic
- Died: June 3, 1994 (aged 75); Santo Domingo, Dominican Republic
- Occupations: Poet and essayist

Aída Cartagena Portalatín (June 18, 1918 – June 3, 1994) was a Dominican poet, fiction writer, and essayist who was an influential part of the Poesía Sorprendida movement. Many of her works have been translated into English and other languages.

== Biography ==
She was born in Moca, Dominican Republic, where she completed her elementary and secondary education. She is the daughter of Felipe Cartagena Estrella and Olimpia Portalatín. She later moved to the capital of the Dominican Republic, where she earned her Doctorate in Humanities at the Universidad Autónoma de Santo Domingo. She pursued her post-graduate studies at École du Louvre in Paris, and majored in museology and theory of fine arts.

In her early career, Cartagena Portalatín was part of the "poesía sorprendida" (surprised poetry) movement in the Dominican Republic. Poesía Sorprendida was initiated in October 1943 through the publication of the journal La Poesía Sorprendida. Aside from Aída Cartagena Portalatín being a part of this revolutionary movement, some of the other founding members were Franklin Mieses Burgos, Antonio Fernández, Alberto Baeza Flores, Domingo Moreno Jiménez and Mariano Lebrón Saviñón. This movement was surprisingly successful and very much in the open throughout the tyranny of Rafael Trujillo, where freedom of expression was strictly forbidden. La Poesia Sorprendida was closed down in 1947 by the Trujillo regime. The activists' philosophy was as follows: "We are nourished by a national poetry in the universal, unique way of being itself; with classic yesterday, today, tomorrow, creating boundless, border less and permanent; and the mysterious man, universal world, secret, solitary and intimate, creator always."

Aída Cartagena Portalatín stands out as a universal voice that nevertheless speaks from a particular location in the Caribbean that is often overlooked by the world's educated peoples (as evidenced in the lack of inclusion of her work in libraries, reference works, and online sources of literature). Her work was philosophical as well as historical, reflecting a broad worldview, that encompassed themes such as feminism, colonialism, imperialism, as well as current events contemporary to her times. Her many trips to Europe, Latin America and Africa gave her the first-hand experiences that later turned into fuel and inspiration to write her literary pieces.

One of her most famous poems is "Una mujer está sola," which starts with the lines:

"Una mujer está sola. Sola con su estatura. Con los ojos abiertos. Con los brazos abiertos. Con el corazón abierto como un silencio ancho." ("A woman is alone. Alone with her stature. With her eyes open. With her arms open. With her heart open like a wide silence.")

In another poem, she refers to the racial politics of the United States through a consideration of a Dominican mother: "de su vientre nacieron siete hijos/ que serían en Dallas, Memphis o Birmingham un problema racial / (ni blancos ni negros)" ("from her womb were born seven children / who would in Dallas, Memphis or Birmingham be a racial problem / (neither white nor black)") (p. 207, Obra poética completa: 1955–1984)

Cartagena Portalatín was a finalist in the prestigious Premio Seix Barral international literary award competition in Barcelona for her novel Escalera para Electra (1969).

She published another famous poem, Yania Tierra, in 1981. Poema Documento (documentary poem), is the subtitle of this book-length poem, which traces the history of the Dominican Republic through the point of view of Yania Tierra, a female personification of the nation.

She also taught at the Universidad Autónoma de Santo Domingo, in the fields of art history, colonial art and history of civilization.

Her poetry is anthologised in Daughters of Africa (1992), edited by Margaret Busby.

== Works ==
- Vispera del Sueño: Poemas para un Atardecer, La Poesia Sorprendida (Ciudad Trujillo, Dominican Republic), 1944.
- Llamale Verde (poems), La Poesia Sorprendida, 1945.
- Mi Mundo el Mar (poems), La Isla Necesaria (Ciudad, Trujillo), 1955.
- Una Mujer Está Sola (poems), La Isla Necesaria, 1955.
- La Voz Desatada (poems), Brigadas Dominicanas (Santo Domingo, Dominican Republic), 1962.
- La Tierra Está Escrita (poems), Brigadas Dominicanas, 1967.
- Escalera para Electra (novel), 1969.Fcall (2nd edition, Montesinos (Santo Domingo), 1980.)
- Narradores dominicanos: antología. Monte Ávila Editores (Caracas), 1969.
- Dos técnicas cerámicas indonatillanas, (Santo Domingo, Dominican Republic), 1971 or 1972.
- Danza, música e instrumentos de los indios de la Española, Museo de Antopologia, Universidad Autónoma de Santo Domingo, Facultad de Humanidades (Santo Domingo, Dominican Republic), 1974.
- Tablero: doce cuentos de lo popular a lo culto (stories), Taller (Santo Domingo), 1978.
- Yania Tierra, Montesinos, 1981.
- En la Casa del Tiempo (poems), Montesinos, 1984.
- La Tarde en Que Murio Estefania, Montesinos, 1984.
- Las Culturas Africanas: Rebeldes con Causa, Montesinos, 1986.
- La mujer en la literatura: homenaje a Aida Cartagena Portalatín. Editora Universal UASD (Santo Domingo), 1986.
- From Desolation to Compromise: A Bilingual Anthology of the Poetry of Aida Cartagena Portalatin, Montesinos, 1988.
- Vispera del sueño al mundo. Feria del Libro José Martí (Santo domingo), 1995.
- Aida Cartagena Portalatin: selección poética, Consejo Nacional de Educación (Santo Domingo, Dominican Republic), 2000.
- Obra poética completa: 1955-1984, Biblioteca Nacional de la República Dominicana (Santo Domingo, Dominican Republic), 2000.

Contributor to periodicals, including La Poesia Sorprendida.*
