= José Vela Zanetti =

Spanish painter

- Cojuelo, Vela Zanetti, Museo de Arte Moderno, Santo Domingo

José Vela Zanetti (May 27, 1913 – January 4, 1999) was a Spanish painter and muralist who worked in Spain, the Dominican Republic and the United States.

== Early years ==
Vela Zanetti was born in Milagros (Province of Burgos), Spain on May 27, 1913. He spent his childhood in León and later moved to Madrid, where he studied under José Ramón Zaragoza. In 1931, his first solo exhibition was held in León. He was awarded a scholarship to study in Italy in 1933.

In 1936, during the Spanish Civil War, Vela Zanetti’s father was executed for his socialist beliefs. At the end of the war, in 1939, Vela Zanetti went into exile in the Dominican Republic, as did artists Josep Gausachs and Eugenio Granell.

== The Dominican Republic ==
Vela Zanetti was extremely successful in the Dominican Republic. He had his first solo exhibition in Santo Domingo a year after his arrival, and his career as a muralist flourished. Vela Zanetti was commissioned to paint more than 100 murals in the country, including works in the Justice Building, Central Bank and National Library (all in Santo Domingo). In addition to working as an artist, he became a professor at the National School of Fine Arts in Santo Domingo in 1945, and was named the school’s director in 1949.

== New York ==
Vela Zanetti won a Guggenheim Fellowship for Hispanic artists in 1951. He used the fellowship to travel to New York and decided to stay for several years. In 1953, he painted his most famous work Mankind's Struggle for a Lasting Peace, a mural at the UN headquarters in New York. Painted in a somber palette of blues and browns, the work depicts the horrors of war and shows people working together to rebuild the world.

== Return to Spain ==
In 1960 he returned to Spain. In his later years, the artist focused on easel paintings, particularly portraits, still lifes, landscapes and religious works. He died on January 4, 1999, in Burgos, Spain, at the age of 85.
