= Ada Balcácer =

Dominican visual artist (1930–2025)

- Born: 16 June 1930; Santo Domingo, Dominican Republic
- Died: 25 December 2025 (aged 95); Santo Domingo, Dominican Republic
- Education: National Fine Art School
- Occupation: Visual artist

Ada Balcácer Cabrera (16 June 1930 – 25 December 2025) was a Dominican multimedia visual artist whose artistic work ranges from painted works, textile designs, murals, and printmaking. Known for her compositional themes of Caribbean mysticism and naturalism, Balcácer won several national and international awards.

== Life and career ==
Balcácer was born in Santo Domingo, on 16 June 1930, and grew up during the dictatorship of Rafael Trujillo. Her early childhood years were spent between Santo Domingo and San Juan de la Maguana, where she developed a love for botany, science, and folklore. When Balcácer was 16, during a parade in San Juan de la Maguana, an accident while riding a horse led to a fractured wrist that later developed gangrene and obliged the doctors to amputate her left arm. She has said of the incident: "I am one of two one-armed painters in Latin American art history. The other one was José Clemente Orozco, the Mexican muralist. I've never felt different and have been painting for the past 64 years ever since my goals changed."

In 1951, she graduated from the National School of Fine Arts in Santo Domingo. There, she studied under teachers who had emigrated from the war in Europe, such as Josep Gausachs, George Hausdorf, and Manolo Pascual, as well as native Dominican artists, like Celeste Woss y Gil. Oscar de la Renta was her classmate.

Motivated to leave the environment of Trujillo dictatorship, Balcácer moved to New York City, shortly after graduating, working as a textile designer. She returned home shortly after the 1961 assassination of Trujillo.

After returning for a visit to the Iowa workshop of printmaker Mauricio Lasansky, Balcácer started her exploration in printmaking. She joined the group Nueva Imagen (New Image) in 1972 and became interested in the aesthetic possibilities of light and color while exploring tropical Dominican and Caribbean themes. She also began creating increasingly abstract compositions.

When she turned 70, Balcácer relocated to Miami, Florida. In November 2008, the then-78-year-old Balcácer opened the ABRO Gallery by Ada Balcácer, in Miami's Wynwood Art District. The ABRO closed in 2012.

Balcácer died on 25 December 2025, at the age of 95.
