= Alberto Baeza Flores =

Chilean poet, writer, and journalist

- Born: January 11, 1914; Santiago, Chile
- Died: January 6, 1998 (aged 83); Miami, Florida
- Occupations: poet, writer, and journalist

Alberto Baeza Flores (1914–1998) was a Chilean poet, writer, and journalist. Prolific and an influential sorprendista of the Poesía Sorprendida movement in Dominican Republic, he traveled throughout Latin America, Europe, and the United States, with poetic subjects ranging from the political to the social, the sentimental, from the every day mundane to the cosmic, from the transcendent to the inconsequential.

== Early life ==
Alberto Baeza Flores was born on January 11, 1914, in Santiago, Chile to a middle-class family. He first published his poems at the age of 19 in the magazine Ecran of Santiago in 1933. This was followed by his founding the magazine Eidolon (Image) in 1934, a journal which had a short existence. He was active politically early in life. By 1936 he professed solidarity with Republican Spain; in 1937, he became affiliated with the League for the Defense of the Rights of Man; and at home he worked for the "Chilean Popular Front." Interestingly, his leftist leanings were in accordance with his Catholic upbringing and his family influences. He was never a radical or extremist. In fact, Baeza labeled himself "a Democratic Socialist, like Norman Thomas or Adlai Stevenson.

His political beliefs developed under the turbulent events of his youth (Great Depression, Hitler's rise to power, etc). He considered himself a member of the "Generation of 1938," a literary development characterized by a feeling of anguish and a need for commitment. All that Baeza has written reflects the anxiety of living in a world where technological progress has not been matched by an alleviation of human suffering.

== Literary career ==
According to Baeza Flores himself, he assimilated the styles of Garcilaso, Becquer, Antonio Machado, Juan Ramon Jimenez, Gongora, Quevedo, Gabriela Mistral, Cesar Vallejo, Vicente Huidobro, Pablo Neruda, Paul Eluard, Rainer Maria Rilke, Guillaume Apollinaire, Ezra Pound, Boris Pasternak, and Bertolt Brecht. These luminaries exerted their influence in different eras of his life, which accounts for the variety of styles in his poetry.

In July 1939, he arrived in Havana and fell in love with the country and its people, and decided to make Cuba his home. Baeza Flores stated that one of the reasons he went to Cuba was to know firsthand "the homeland of Jose Marti and read it under the light of his Island — even though he was a man of many exiles and uprooting." Baeza became active in Cuban political and literary circles while simultaneously engaging in a variety of undertakings. He contributed to Multitud of Santiago, Chile, to Repertorio Americano of San Jose, Costa Rica, to El Pais, Hoy and Accion Social of Havana, among many other journals. Moreover, he translated French surrealist poetry, compiled selections on Afrocuban poetry for Cantos y cuentos negros de Cuba, gave radio talks; all this in addition to his job as chancellor to the General Consulate of Chile in Havana.

A change of position compelled the writer-diplomat to leave for the Dominican Republic, in 1943, during the Trujillo regime. His literary activity consisted of the following: In 1943, he founded a literary page in La Opinion, where he initiated a cultural section entitled "Ventana de Cada dia"; he gave lectures for various groups; he founded, together with Domingo Moreno Jimenez and Mariano Lebron, the poetic movement called "Los Triaiogos"; he helped establish and co-edited the movement and magazine La Poesia Sorprendida, who according to Franklin Mieses Burgos, was Baeza Flores who suggested the name. However, he has largely remained obscure, particularly in his home country, due to the fact that most of his literary work was produced outside of Chile.

== A Few Works ==
- Israel (La estrella en el huracan)
- Tercer mundo (Poesia comprometida)
- Las cadenas vienen de lejos
- Cuaderno de la Madre y del Nino
- Poesía caminante, 1934-1984
- Tres piezas de teatro hacia el mañana (Shakespeare Siglo XXI)
- La muerte en el paraiso: Novela de la revolucion Cubana
- Las dos orillas: Poemas de los encuentros (Colección Ariadna)

== Translations ==
- Poemas para cuatro manos tr. Beatriz Zeller
