= Yania Tierra =

Yania Tierra is a Spanish language documentary poem written by Aída Cartagena Portalatín and published in 1981 as Yania Tierra: Poema Documento (Yania Tierra: Document Poem). It traces the history of the Dominican Republic, beginning with the time of Columbus, using Yania Tierra as a viewpoint character. There is also a bilingual version of the poem.

== See also ==
- National personification
- Columbia
