= Rosa Tavarez =

Dominican painter and engraver (1939–2023)

Rosa Tavárez
- Born: Rosa Mercedes Tavárez Payams; April 27, 1939; Santiago de los Caballeros, Dominican Republic
- Died: February 5, 2023 (aged 83)
- Education: School of Fine Arts of Santiago and National School of Fine Arts of Santo Domingo, Santo Domingo
- Known for: Painting, Drawing, Sculpture, Writing, Engraving, Anthropology
- Awards: Medal of Merit awarded in 1994 by the President of the Dominican Republic, General Ministry for the Promotion of Women, the Medal of Merit (2005), Contribution to Education and the Arts given to her by the Universidad Ibero-Americana (UNIBE) in 2007, The House of Representatives of the Dominican Republic distinguished her by dedicating the fifth floor of its building to the artworks of Rosa Tavarez

Rosa Tavarez (April 27, 1939 – February 5, 2023) was a Dominican painter and engraver.

== Biography ==
Rosa Tavarez was born in Santiago de los Caballeros, Dominican Republic on April 27, 1939. Tavarez began her studies in drawing and painting in 1955 with Master Yoryi Morel at the School of Fine Arts of Santiago, continuing in Santo Domingo at the National School of Fine Art under professors including Jaime Colson, Celeste Woss and Gil Gilberto Hernandez Ortega; she graduated as Professor of Fine Arts in early 1969. From 1971 to 1979, Tavarez studied printmaking at the Art Students League of New York. In 1979 she studied Artisan Design in Popayán, Colombia. In 1989, she finished a training workshop on Art and Anthropology, taught by Dr. Jose Alcina Franch, at the Dominican Museum of the Man. In 2004 she concluded a Post-Graduate Course in Cultural Management at the Universidad Autónoma de Santo Domingo (UASD).

Tavarez taught for 35 years as Director, Professor of Drawing, Professor of Graphic Arts and Professor of Painting at the National School of Fine Arts, the School of Fine Arts of Santiago, the School of Fine Arts of San Francisco de Macorís, and the School of Fine Arts of Baní. In 1973, she founded the Printmaking Workshop of the National School of Fine Arts. She also taught at private institutions such as APEC University where she taught graphic arts (1970–1977), the School of Design at Altos de Chavon affiliated with Parsons, the New School for Design, and the University of Mexico UNAM, where she taught Graphic Arts and Psychology of the Art from 1983 to 1988.

From 1975 she exhibited her works nationally and internationally at museums and galleries. Among the most important were the exhibitions at the Museum of Modern Art in Santo Domingo in 1982 (The Idols) and 2001 (Echoes of the Ecological Cry); the 1993 Series Wounded Geometry; Enigmas, prints and drawings exhibited at the Museum of Art and History of San Juan, Puerto Rico in 1988. She has also participated in important international exhibitions such as the Museum of Printmaking in Italy.

Tavarez received numerous prizes, awards and distinctions, including the Medal of Merit awarded in 1994 by the President of the Dominican Republic and the General Ministry for the Promotion of Women. The Medal of Merit was awarded for her 35 years of teaching by the President of the Dominican Republic, Dr. Leonel Fernández, in 2005. A Recognition for her Contribution to Education and the Arts was given to her by the Universidad Ibero-Americana (UNIBE) in 2007. In 2009, the Congress of the Dominican Republic dedicated the fifth floor of its building to the artworks of Tavarez. Her career was also recognized in 2012 Supreme Court of Justice of Spain and the Juan Carlos III Foundation for the exhibition: 200 Years of the Constitution of the Supreme Court of Spain (1812-2012). Tavarez was award the National Prize for Visual Arts in 2017 Ministry of Culture in the Dominican Republic.

Tavarez's artworks are shown at museums, art galleries and permanent collections worldwide, including the Museum of Modern Art in Santo Domingo, Casa de Las Americas in Havana, Cuba, The Housatonic Museum of Art in Connecticut, the Gallery of the Inter-American Development Bank in Washington DC, and the Museums of Modern Art in London, Mexico, Colombia, and Venezuela.

Tavarez has directed the Dominican Association of Plastic Artists from 2000 to 2003. In 2000, she founded the House of Engraving, a center specializing in research, rescue, protection, motivation and projection of the engraving and the print media. She is a member of the Dominican School of Artists, the International Association of Artists AIAAP, and the International Council of Museums (ICOM).

Dominican painter, Fernando Ureña Rib, suggests Tavarez's "work emerges from the depths of her being like the tearing apart of vital forces that invade the canvas and, therefore, shake the viewer."
