= Mariano Lebrón Saviñón =

Dominican author (1922–2014)

Mariano Lebrón Saviñón (3 August 1922, in Santo Domingo – 18 October 2014) was a Dominican author of the 20th century. One of the founders of the second private university in the Dominican Republic, he named it the Universidad Nacional Pedro Henríquez Ureña, also writing its anthem. He was born on August 3, 1922, in Santo Domingo, the son of a Spanish immigrant, José Lebrón Morales (a native of Seville, southern Spain), and a Dominican mother, Rosa Cándida Saviñón Pérez, of Canarian descent. He attended primary and secondary education in Santo Domingo. He received his medical degree at the University of Santo Domingo in 1946, and in 1949 (specializing in pediatrics) in Buenos Aires, Argentina.

He directed the hospital of Santo Domingo Social Prevention and worked in the Ministry of Health, the Ramfis hospital, Father Billini Hospital, and several medical clinics in the country. Alongside the practice of medicine, he was Director of Publications of the National University Pedro Henríquez Ureña and professor of medicine at the university and the Autonomous University of Santo Domingo.

He is one of the most influential writers from the Poesía Sorprendida (Surprised Poetry) movement, and made important contributions to the Dominican Academy of Medicine, and the Institute Duartiano. In addition to his poetry and essays production, is author of the book History of the Dominican culture, one of the most ambitious of its kind in Dominican history.

Among numerous recognition he has received are: Commander of the Order of Merit of Duarte, Sánchez and Mella, Caonabo Gold in 1988, Vasconcelos National Prize Award from the Front Affirmation Hispanist of Mexico (1992) and Literature (1999), the highest honor bestowed by the letters in the Dominican Republic, and was the only Dominican chosen to be speaker the Prince of Asturias award, named by Prince Felipe de Borbon y Grecia. From 1984 to 2006 Lebrón chaired the Dominican Academy of Language.

In August 2014 he was admitted to a hospital due to frequent respiratory problems. Because of the delicate state of his health he was readmitted in October. He eventually died at the age of 92 on October 18, 2014.

His surname Lebrón is of Spanish origin. This surname is distributed throughout Spain (mostly in Seville) and Latin America. Not to be confused with Lebron (originally Lebraun) concentrated mostly in Las Matas de Farfán, a town in the San Juan Province, of supposed Haitian/French origin.
