= Josep Gausachs =

Spanish painter

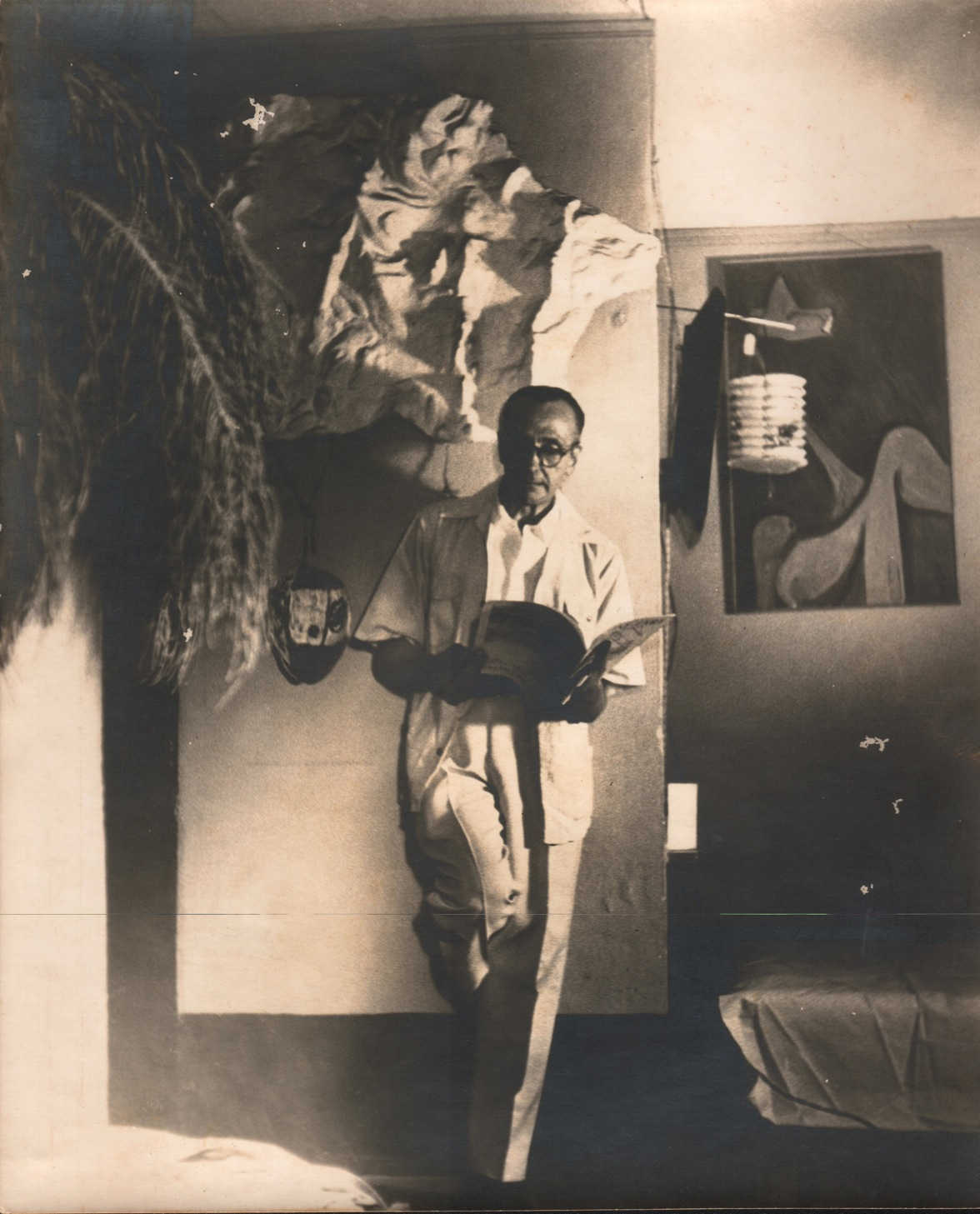
Jose Gausachs in his studio - Santo Domingo

Josep Gausachs Armengol (1889–1959), better known as Josep Gausachs or José Gausachs, was a Catalan artist active in Spain, France and the Dominican Republic.

== Early years ==
Born in 1889 in Barcelona, Spain, Gausachs had a difficult childhood. A medical procedure left his face partially paralyzed at the age of 11. Later in his adolescence, he lost sight in one eye as the result of an accident.

Gausachs studied art at the Escola de Baixas and the Escola de la Llotja, both in Barcelona. He began participating in exhibitions in 1910, and had his first solo exhibition in 1911 in Barcelona.

== Career in Europe ==
After completing his studies Gausachs moved to Paris, where he benefited from contact with such artists as: Modigliani, Juan Gris, De Chirico, Picasso, Albert Marquet, Braque and Marc Chagall. During this period, his work was exhibited in Paris, Brussels and Amsterdam. Gausachs experimented with many different artistic styles, including Impressionism, Cubism, Fauvism, Dadaism, Surrealism and Expressionism.

In 1919, he returned to Barcelona and became a drawing professor at the Academy of Fine Arts. He taught from 1920–1936 and also exhibited his works in Spain and Europe. At the outbreak of the Spanish Civil War (1936–1939), he fled to France and was held in an internment camp in Southern France.

== Career in the Dominican Republic ==
After his release from the internment camp in 1940, Gausachs relocated to the Dominican Republic. This country became home to many Spanish refugees, including the artists Vela Zanetti, Eugenio Granell, Vásquez Díaz and Ada Balcácer.

Among the first professors at the National School of Fine Arts in Santo Domingo, Gausachs had a significant impact on future generations of Dominican artists. His students included Gilberto Hernández Ortega, Clara Ledesma, Paul Guidicelli and Eligio Pichardo.

In addition to landscapes, he is known for his portraits and nudes of mulatto women. He had his first solo exhibition in the Dominican Republic in 1944, presenting 187 works that included landscapes, floral still lifes, portraits and genre scenes. In 1950, Galería Syra in Barcelona held a retrospective of his work. Another retrospective, featuring 52 works from the previous 15 years, was held in 1954 in Santo Domingo. Gausachs, along with Jaime Colson and Gilberto Hernández Ortega, participated in an important international exhibition organized by the Ateneo de Caracas (Venezuela) in 1955.

Gausachs died in Santo Domingo in 1959, at the age of 70.
