= Boutaleb =

Boutaleb may refer to:

- Boutaleb, a town and commune in Algeria;
- Abdelhadi Boutaleb (1923–2009), a Moroccan statesman and politician.
- General Ahmed Boutaleb, commander of the Royal Moroccan Air Force
- Ahmed Aboutaleb, Dutch politician and Mayor of Rotterdam
- Karima Boutaleb (born 1979), French artist and curator
