= ArtForo =

Latin American art fair

ArtForo is an art fair, staged annually, that exhibits works by acclaimed Latin American artists. Artforo also features lectures and symposiums dedicated to the understanding and promotion of Latin American art.

== History ==
ArtForo was started in 2016 in New York City by painter Oscar Abreu and curated by gallerist Karima Boutaleb. In its inaugural year, the Artforo show featured works by visual artists Mariano Sanchez, Joaquin Rosario, Pedro Gallardo, Pablo Palasso, Van Robert and Oscar Abreu. Writer Adrian Cabreja gave a lecture on Psycho-Expressionism.

In 2017, ArtForo expanded into a multi-art fair that featured visual arts, culinary arts, and music. Musical performances were given by Emi Antonio, Alvaro, Gabbano, Roy Tavare and Zeo Munoz. David Nunez was the chef of the fair's opening gala and provided a selection of Japanese/ Dominican fused foods. Lectures were provided by art critic Gamal, Michelen Stefan, art critic Odalis G. Perez, writer Ramon Dario Jimenez, producer Armando Guareno and Councilmember Ydanis Rodriguez. 2017's ArtForo was dedicated to Freddy Javier, a veteran Dominican artist.
