= Oscar Abreu =

Dominican Republic painter

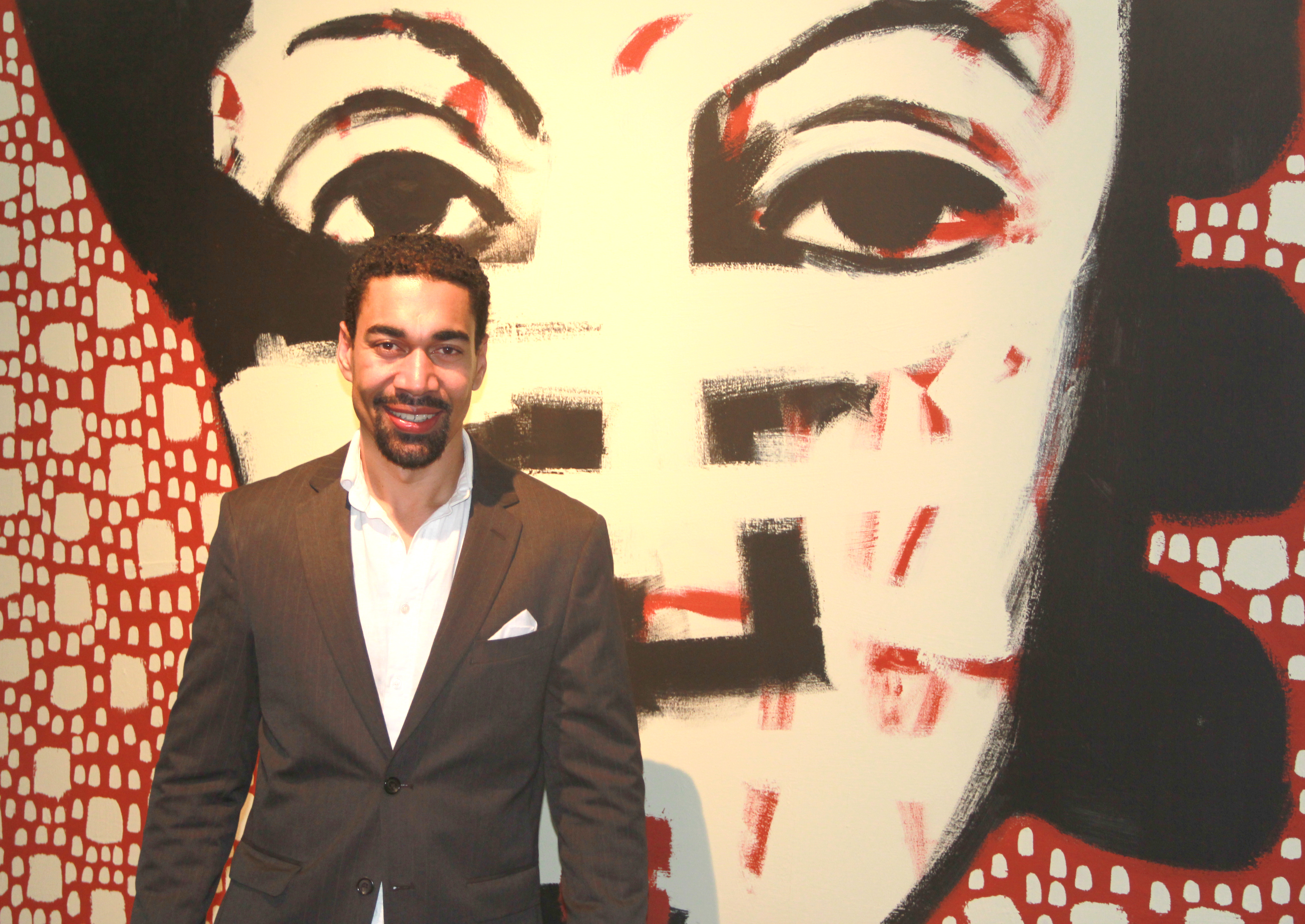
- Abreu in 2014
- Born: March 6, 1978 (age 48); San Juan de la Maguana, Dominican Republic
- Education: Marwen Foundation; School of the Art Institute of Chicago
- Known for: Painting, sculpture, performance art
- Style: Psycho-Expressionism
- Website: oscarabreu.com

Oscar Abreu (born March 6, 1978) is one of the top three most valued Dominican painters according to artprice.com. Oscar Abreu is also a sculptor, art collector, cultural personality and performance artist, who lives and works in Dominican Republic. Abreu is the founder of Centro Abreu and of Psycho-Expressionism, an artistic movement that emphasizes causal relationships that characterize specific psychological states.

== Education ==
Abreu began his formal art education (in 1987) under the notable art instructor José Nicolás Jiménez, who was the director of visual arts at La Escuela de Bellas Artes de San Juan de la Maguana in San Juan de la Maguana, Dominican Republic.

Abreu moved to Alcalá de Henares, Spain in 1989 and was enrolled in the Francisco de Quevedo School, an elementary school. While in Spain, Abreu had the opportunity to impress an art shopkeeper named Master Muñoz, who gave art lesson aside from selling art. And like Jiménez, Muñoz would further his artistic training.

Abreu continued developing his ideas and technique at the Marwen Foundation of Chicago (1994) and also at a special program, for gifted high school students, at the School of the Art Institute of Chicago the following year (1995).

== Psycho-Expressionism ==
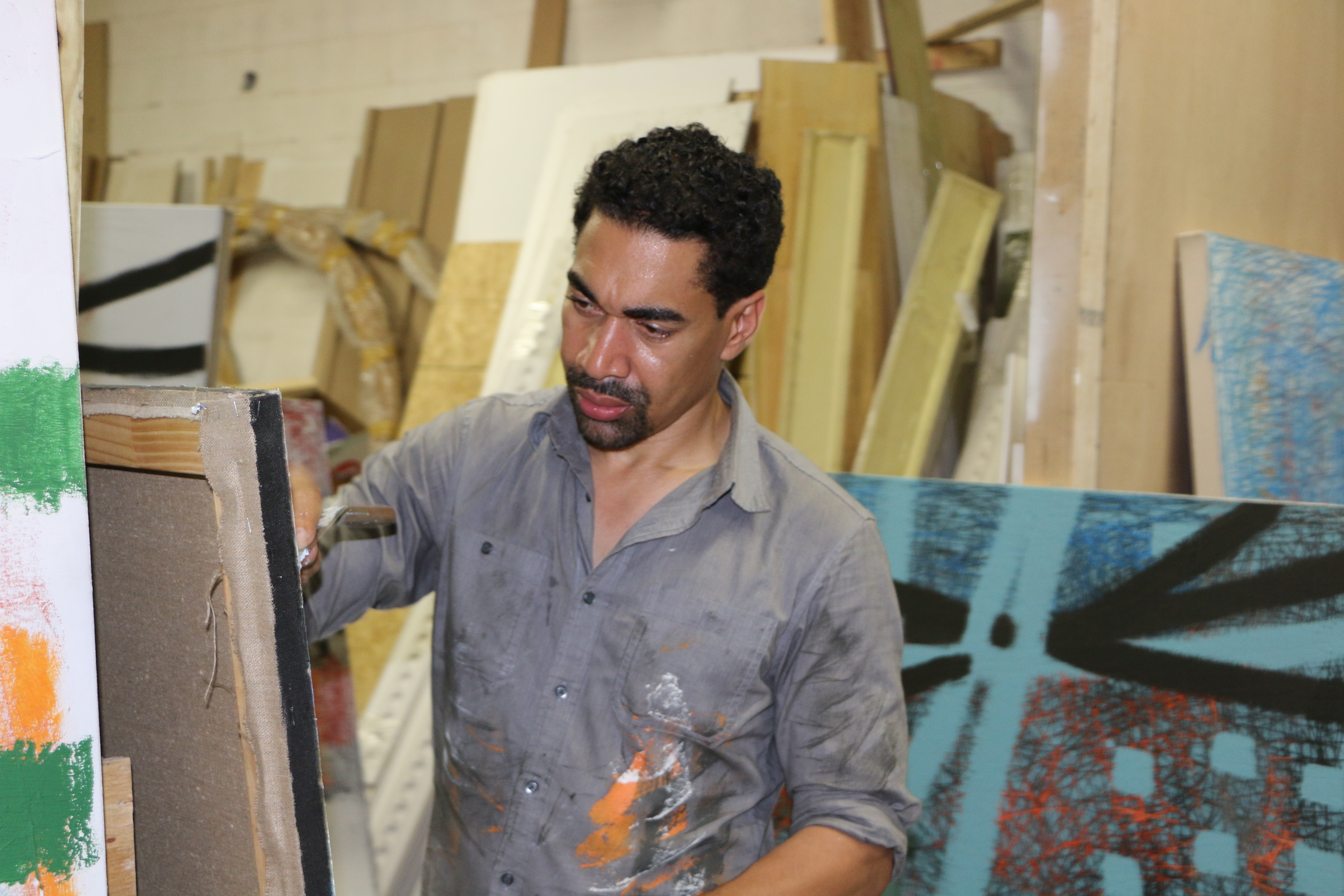
Abreu working in his studio in New York City

At the age of 16, Abreu immigrated to the city of Chicago and experienced substantial hardship and poverty. Throughout this period, Abreu pioneered Psycho-Expressionism, an artistic movement that canvasses the causal relationships that characterize specific psychological states.

Abreu's works, in essence, deal with the question concerning what events cause the development or the stagnation of personality. Also, he entertains questions directed to the phenomenon of memory and human behavior.

In answering this question Abreu has developed a language or patterns over the years. These languages are a culmination of distinct tokens that continually present themselves in his works. The tokens that Abreu formulates through brush strokes, colors, scratches and collages further serve as symbols that reflect the elements which he believes makes the human physique. For example, a pattern that transcribes itself through most of his paintings is that of a set of small squares that surround a central figure.

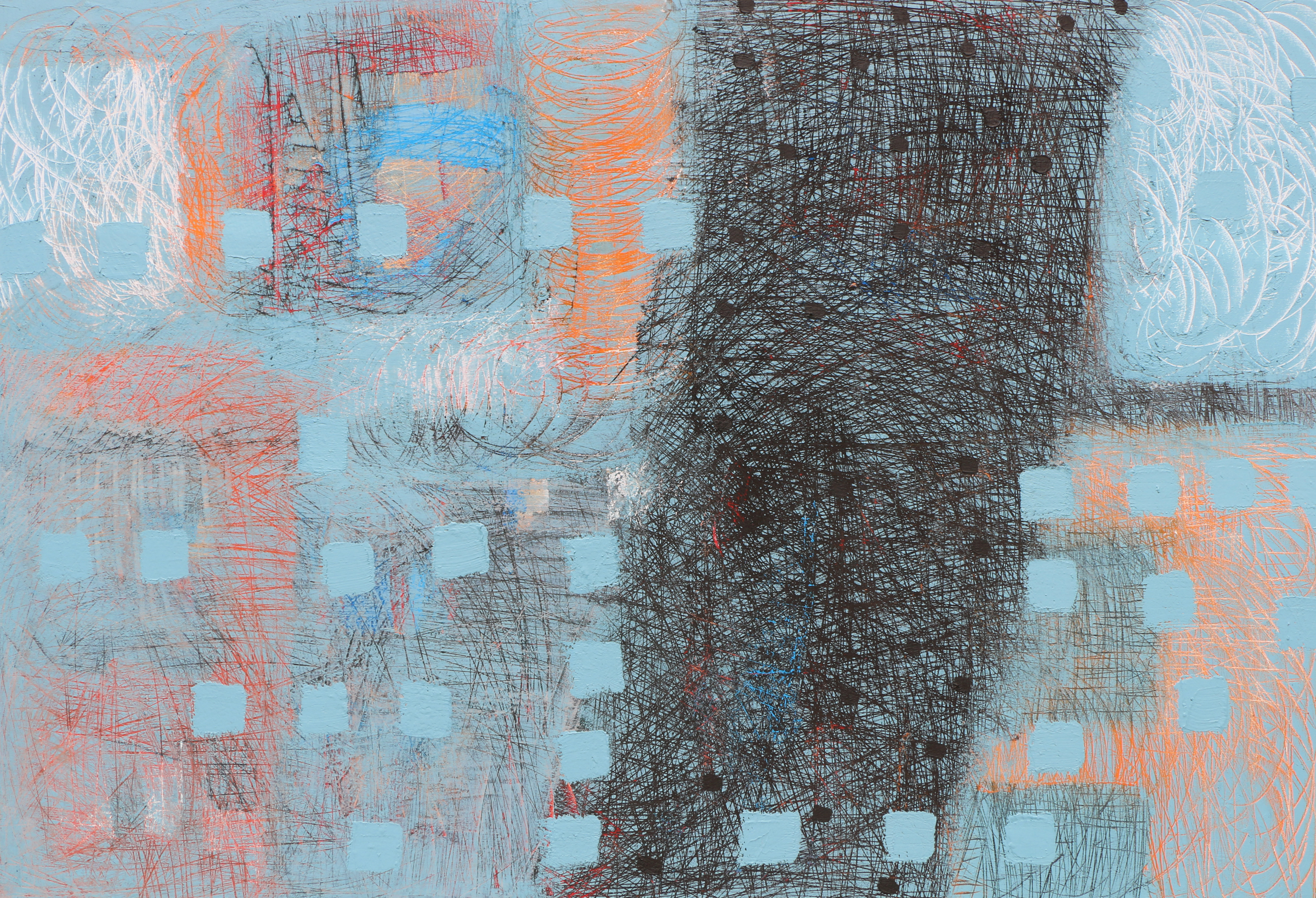
Structure of Dual Personality, 48 x 70 in, Mixed Media on Canvas, 2015

The central figure usually symbolizes a particular memory or psychological state. Abreu's squares account for routine and history, two components of the mind, that in most cases, are not consciously accounted for, but that play an integral part in the formation of our personalities. Thus, he metaphorically deposits these squares in the background to represent their apparent secondary nature and to simultaneously establish the fact that they are a necessary part of the image.

He represents his squares with contrasting colors, or within the same domain of the background color, to expose and represent situations in which we find ourselves every day.

The central figure is constructed with layers of color, one above the other. After this is done, Abreu uses a spatula and scratches certain areas of the figure. Through the scratches, hints of different and earlier color layers are revealed. This method is symbolic of the evolutionary processes that transform our personalities and further of our psychological histories.

== Career ==
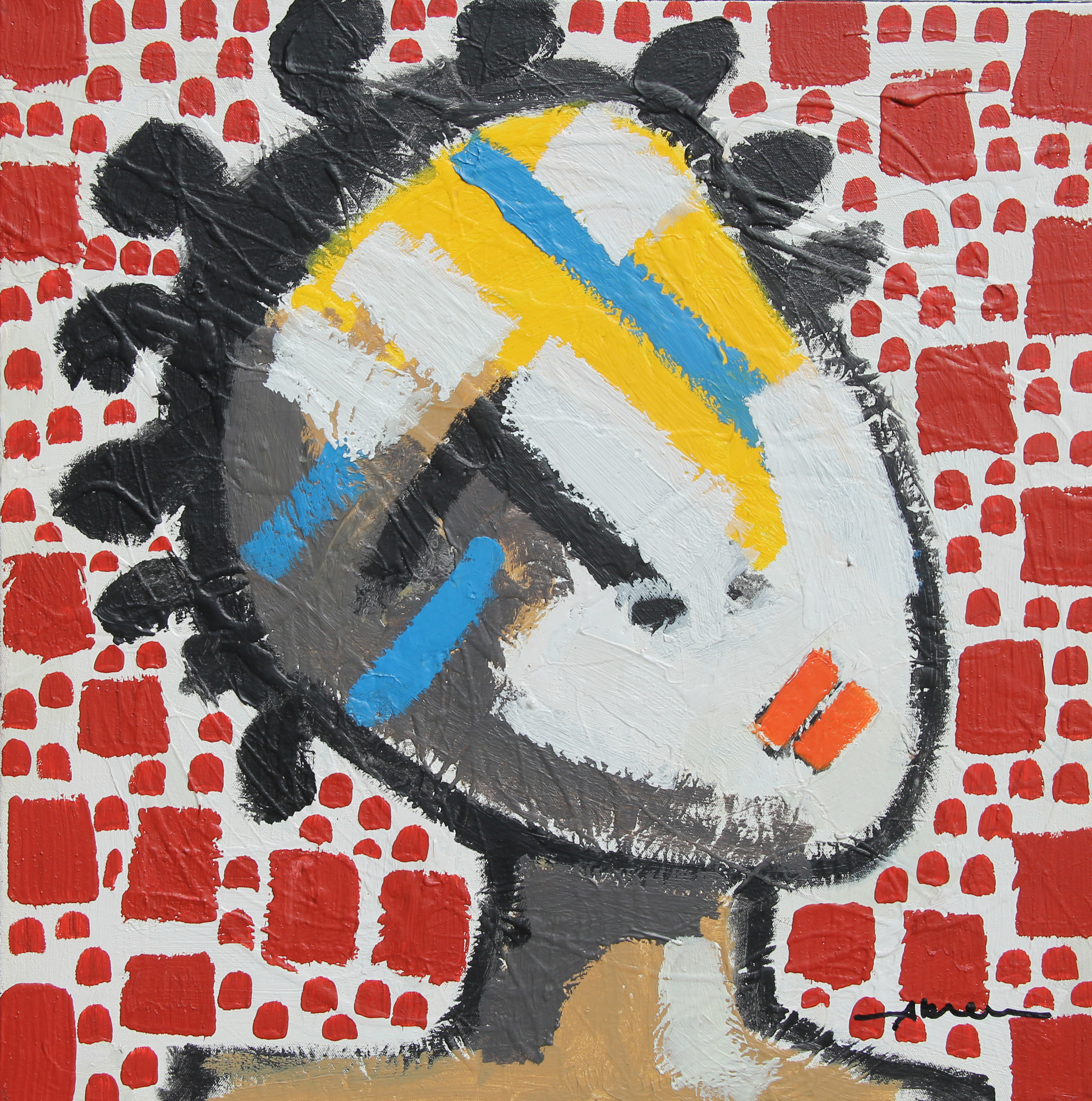
Maria Moñito, 2014 Mixed media on canvas, 24" x 24"

Abreu has been featured in over 28 solo exhibitions and participated in over 50 group exhibitions worldwide. Abreu has presented his works in major cities and countries that include: Chicago, New York City and Miami, Puerto Rico and the Dominican Republic. Some of Abreu's most notable exhibitions are titled: El mal de las drogas, Huellas: La invención de lo visible, The Glory of Our Independence, and Irónicamente Absurdo.

In 2015, Abreu was invited as a featured artist to Artexpo New York and to the 4th annual Miami River Art Fair. During October 2015, Abreu honored the memory of major league player Mateo Rojas Alou in New York City, by painting a portrait of Alou.

In 2016, the Galería Nacional de Bellas Artes in Santo Domingo, held an exhibition titled Mi Psico- Expressionismo, to honor Abreu's career thus far. Abreu premiered ArtForo, Art Fair in the Spring of 2016. ArtForo was the first-ever art fair exclusively featuring Dominican artists in the United States.

In 2017, the New York State Senate, the New York State Assembly and the New York City Council recognized Abreu for his community work and his dedication to the Dominican community in Washington Heights.

Abreu currently is one of the top 3 most valued artists of the Dominican Republic(according to auction records found in www.artprice.com).

== Solo exhibitions ==
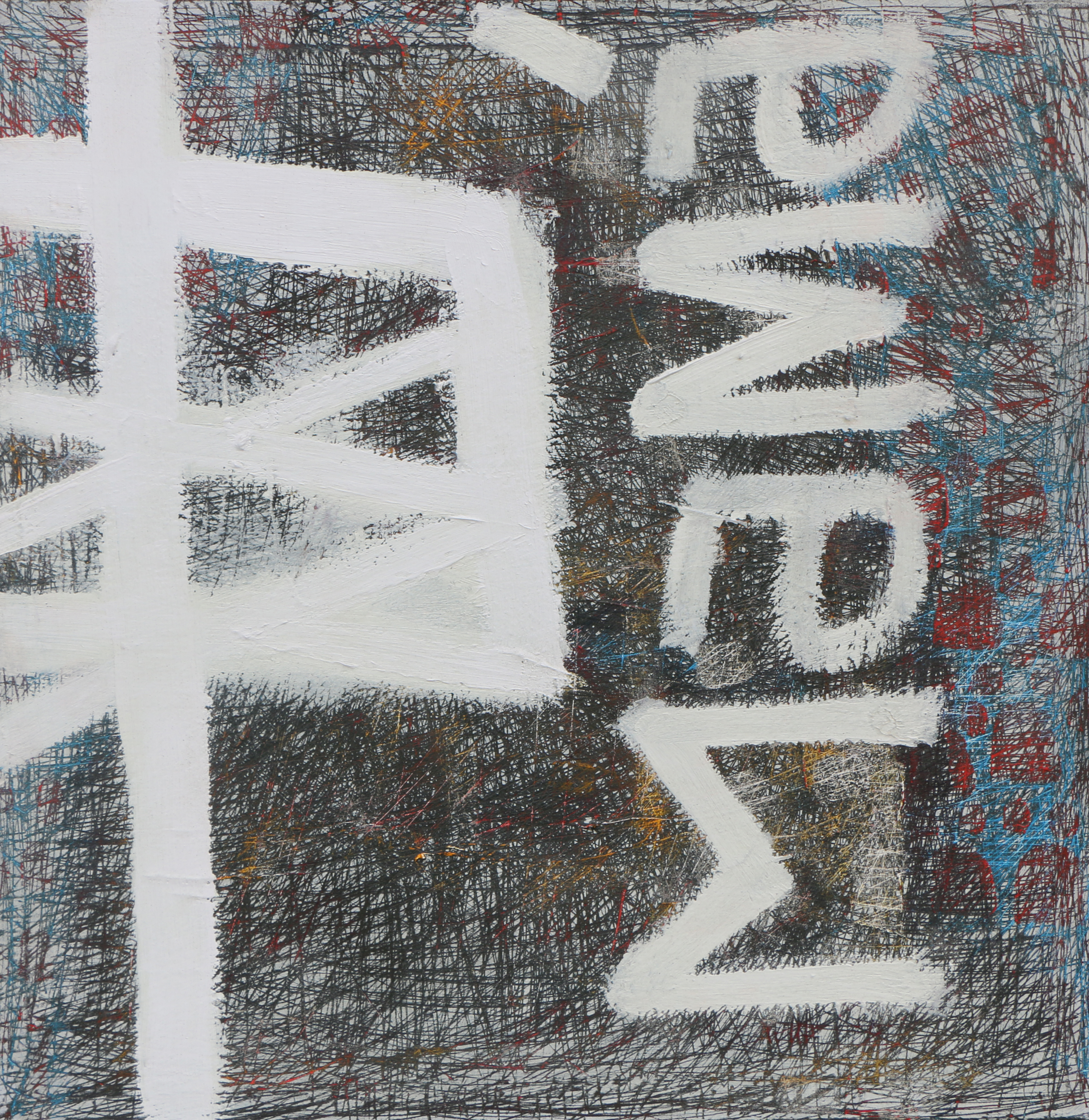
Rasgos inconscinetes, 30.5 x 30.5 in, Acrylic on linen, 2016

2017

"El Origen De La Personalidad" Boutaleb Gallery, New York, N.Y.

"Live Painting Performance" Boutaleb Gallery, New York, N.Y. “Live Art Performance” ARTEXPO, New York, N.Y. .

2016

"Mi Psico-Expresionismo" La Galería Nacional de Bellas Artes, Santo Domingo, Rep. Dom.

“Live Art Demonstration” ARTEXPO, New York, N.Y.

“Obras recientes” ARTFORO, New York, NY

2015

“Fenómeno de la Memoria” Miami River Art Fair, Miami, FL.

“Cabezas” ARTEXPO, New York, N.Y.

“Performance” The Malcolm X & Dr. Betty Shabazz Center, New York, N.Y.

“Performance” Mitchell Square Park, New York, N.Y.

2014

“Estructura de la Memoria” Nina Torres Fine Art, Miami, FL.

“Aspectos de la conducta” Miami River Art Fair, Miami, FL.

“Cabezas” ARTEXPO, New York, N.Y.

2009

“Irónicamente absurdo” Aliaza Francesa, Santo Domingo, Rep. Dom.

“Agitación de la memoria” Centro Abreu, Santo Domingo, Rep. Dom.

2006

"Obras reciente," Artforo Centro Cultural, Santo Domingo, Rep. Dom.

"Detachment of the ego," Marwen Foundation, Chicago, Ill.

"Life of the mind", ARTFORO, Art Off the Main, NYC, NY.

"Punishment of Memory", Joe Hintersteiner Gallery, NYC, NY.

2005

"Acontecimiento del Espiritud," Alianza Gallery, New York, N.Y.

"La forma de la Música" Sofitel, Santo Domingo, R. D.

"Acontecimiento del Espiritud," Galería Prinardi, Hato Rey, Puerto Rico.

"Conexión Cósmica," Palacio Consistorial, Santiago., Republica Dominicana.

"Conexión Cósmica," Colegio Dominicanos de artistas plásticos y las Escuela Nacional de Artes Visuales, Santo Domingo, Republica Dominicana.

"Gloria de la Independencia" Casa de la Cultura Mestizarte, Chicago, Ill.

2004

"Huellas: La invención de lo visible," Museo del Hombre Dominicano, Santo Domingo, R.D.

1999

"Mira a través de mis ojos," Casa Dominicana, Chicago, Ill.

"Resaca de la existencia," Truman Collage, Chicago, Ill.

1997

"Obras recientes," Wells Community Academy, Chicago, Ill.

1996

"El mal de las drogas," Riverside Arts Center, Riverside, Ill.
