= Centro Abreu =

Coordinates: 18.49567°N 69.86671°W

Centro Abreu, formally named Ozamarte Centro de Arte Contemporáneo, is a cultural center in Santo Domingo founded by painter Oscar Abreu. Centro Abreu currently serves as an art gallery, community center, and hub for new and established artists in Santo Domingo.

== History ==
Ozamarte Centro de Arte Contemporáneo was founded in 2006 by painter Oscar Abreu. Ozamarte Centro de Arte Contemporáneo was the first cultural institute built in Santo Domingo's historical East District. The center was inaugurated with Generaciones, an exhibition that featured works by Domingo Liz, Freddy Javier, Elvis Avilés, Amado Melo, José Sejo, and Amaurys Reyes.

In 2007, the center's name was changed to Centro Abreu and was inaugurated with the exhibition "Ironía Radical" by Aram Musset.

In 2008, the center presented the exhibition of French artist Genevieve Laget. Celebrated personalities visited, including the former Director of Aeronautics in the Dominican Republic, José Tomas Pérez; the president of El Partido Nacional de Veteranos y Civiles (The National Veterans and Civil Party), Juan Cohen Sander; and The Honorable Tony Raful, among other figures.
