= Karima Boutaleb =

French artist

- Born: July 20, 1979 (age 47); Champigny Sur Marne, France
- Education: Paris-Sorbonne University
- Style: Expressionism

Karima Boutaleb (born July 20, 1979) is an artist and entrepreneur born in the city of Champigny-sur-Marne in France. Her artistic career started in Santo Domingo, where she lived to study the culture, folklore, and music of the Caribbean.

== Education ==
Karima Boutaleb studied language, literature and foreign civilizations at the Paris-Sorbonne University in 1998.

== Career ==
Boutaleb served as a curator at the Centro Abreu in the Dominican Republic from 2006 to 2010. Boutaleb is the creator and founder of ArtForo, a fair specializing in contemporary art. She is also the founder of Boutaleb Publishing Group that publishes the magazines Gabangi, Boutaleb, Artforo and the newspaper Saludarte.

As an artist, Boutaleb has presented several exhibitions all of which have had a significant impact on the artistic community. For her, the most important part of being an artist is using art as a medium of original and unique expression. "When I go beyond what is seen, through my work, I manifest a peculiar vision of the world, real or imagined, with ideas, perceptions and sensations," says Boutaleb. Boutaleb’s artistic assertion was what motivated, "La esperanza es lo todo," her major exhibition in New York City in 2012. The successful exhibition was attended by major personalities from the political, social and cultural life of New York City.
