= Psycho-Expressionism =

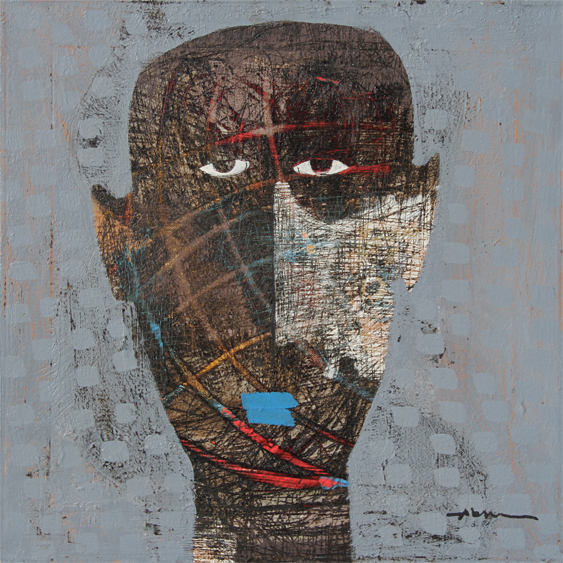
Oscar Abreu, Retroactive Interference

Psycho-Expressionism refers to an artistic style created in the mid-1990s by Dominican painter Oscar Abreu, in which causal relationships that characterize specific psychological states are represented by Abreu through colorful brush strokes, scratches on canvass, and the interplay between the background and subject of the piece.

== History ==
Abreu moved to Chicago, Illinois in 1994 and during his time in this city, Abreu's artistic talent and direction soon matured. The product of this artistic maturation was the creation of a style he calls Psycho - Expressionism. He named the style Psycho-Expressionism, short for psychological-expressionism, as a way to reveal that his works entertain psychological phenomena in a heavily emotive style, unique to expressionism.

== Interpretation ==
Psycho-Expressionism is a culmination of distinct symbols that continually present themselves in Oscar Abreu's works. These symbols that are formulated through brush strokes, vivid colors, scratches and collages represent elements which Abreu believes make the human psyche.

For example, a pattern that has manifested itself in Abreu’s most recent paintings is a set of small squares that surround a central figure. The central figure usually symbolizes a particular memory or psychological state. The squares account for routine and history; two components of the mind that according to Oscar Abreu, are not consciously entertained, but that play an integral part in the formation of our personalities. Thus, he places these squares adjacent to the solid background. He represents his squares with contrasting colors, or within the same domain of the background color, to expose and represent situations which we find ourselves every day.

The central figure is constructed with layers of colors, painted one on top of the other. After this is done he uses a spatula and scratches certain areas of the figure, with the intention to make clear that there is a past. Through the scratches, hints of different and previous color layers are revealed. This is symbolic of the evolutionary processes that transform our personalities and of our psychological histories.

== Psycho-Expressionist Exhibits ==
Some of Abreu's most notable Psycho-Expressionist exhibitions are titled: El mal de las drogas, Riverside Arts Center, Riverside, Ill. 1996; Huellas: La invención de lo visible, Museo del Hombre Dominicano, Santo Domingo, D.R.2004; Behavior of Memory, Alianza Art Gallery, NYC, NY. 2005; Irónicamente Absurdo, Alianza Francesa de Santo Domingo. Santo Domingo, D.R.; and Mi Psico-Expressionismo, Galeria Nacional de Bellas Artes, Santo Domingo, D.R.
