= List of people from the Dominican Republic =

Dominican Republic

Flag

Coat of Arms

This is a list of famous or notable people from the Dominican Republic. The list also includes individuals of Dominican ancestry who reside overseas.

== Authors ==
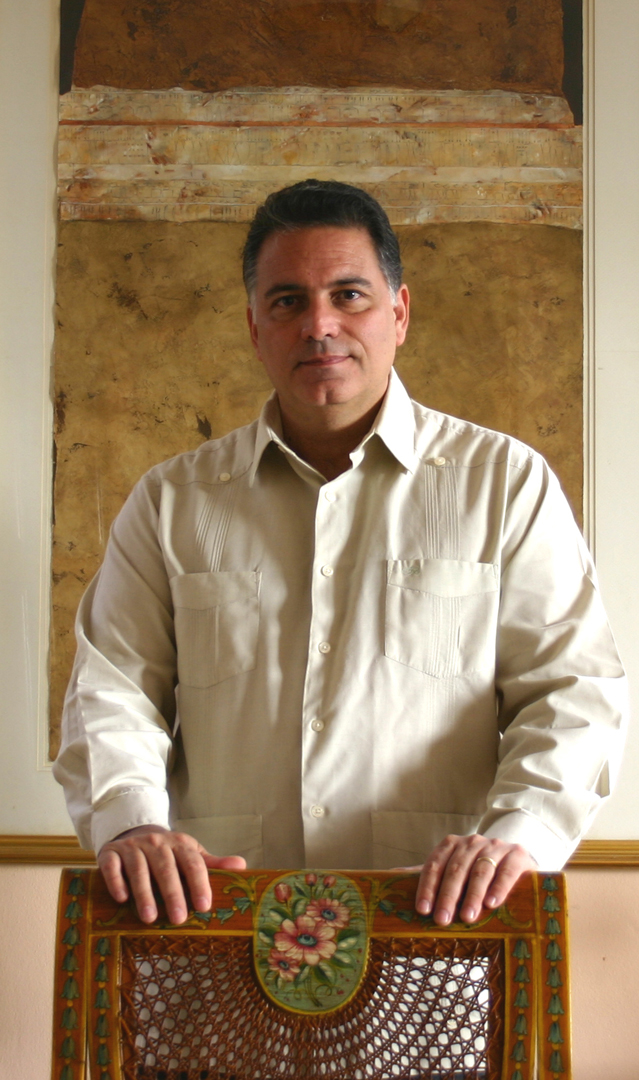
Luis Arambilet

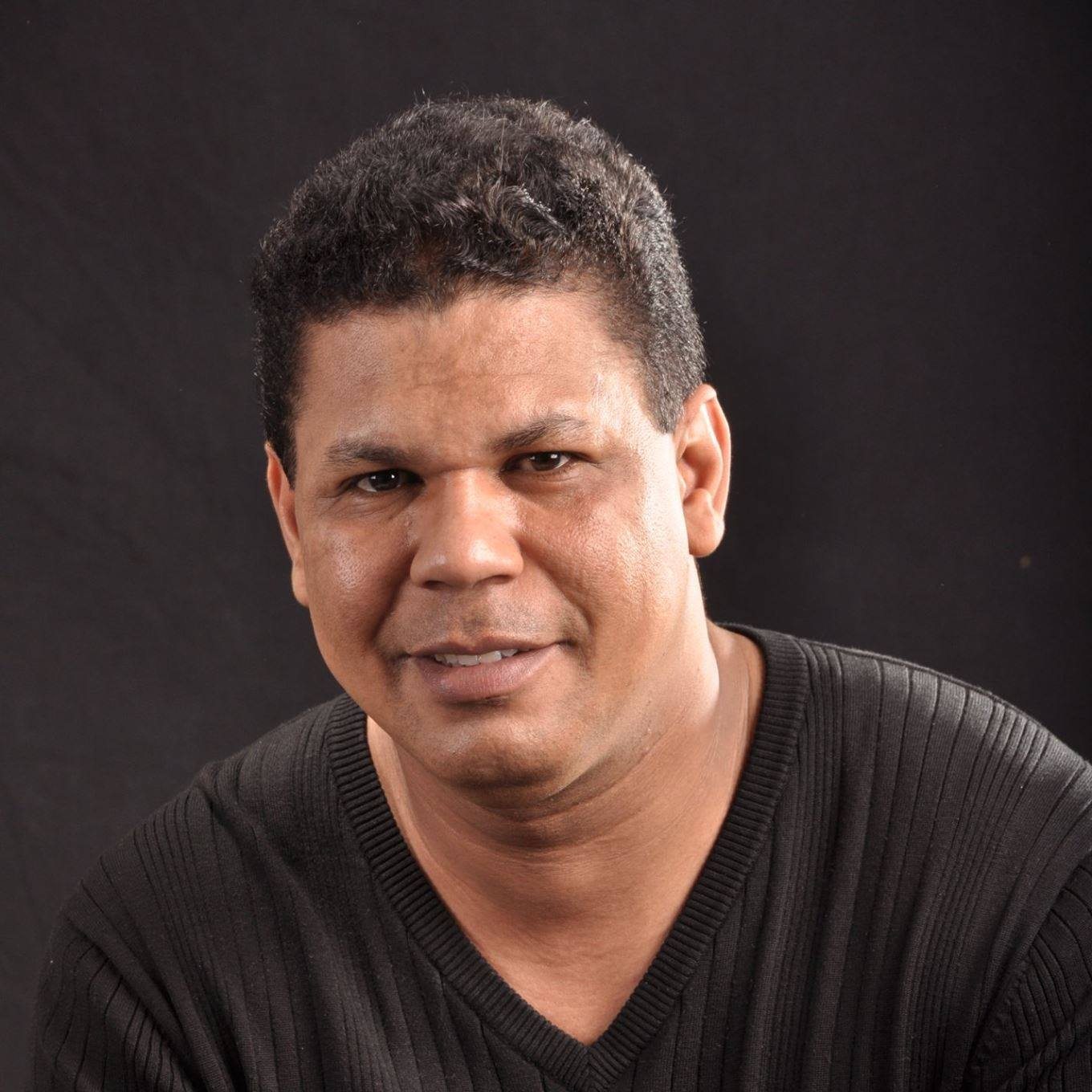
Fernando Cabrera

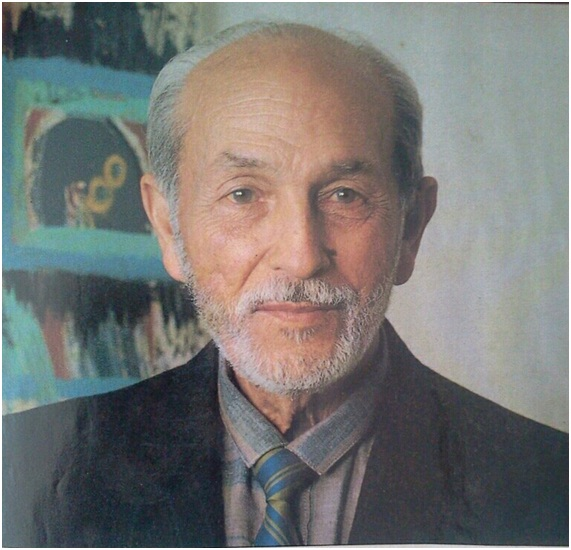
Manuel del Cabral

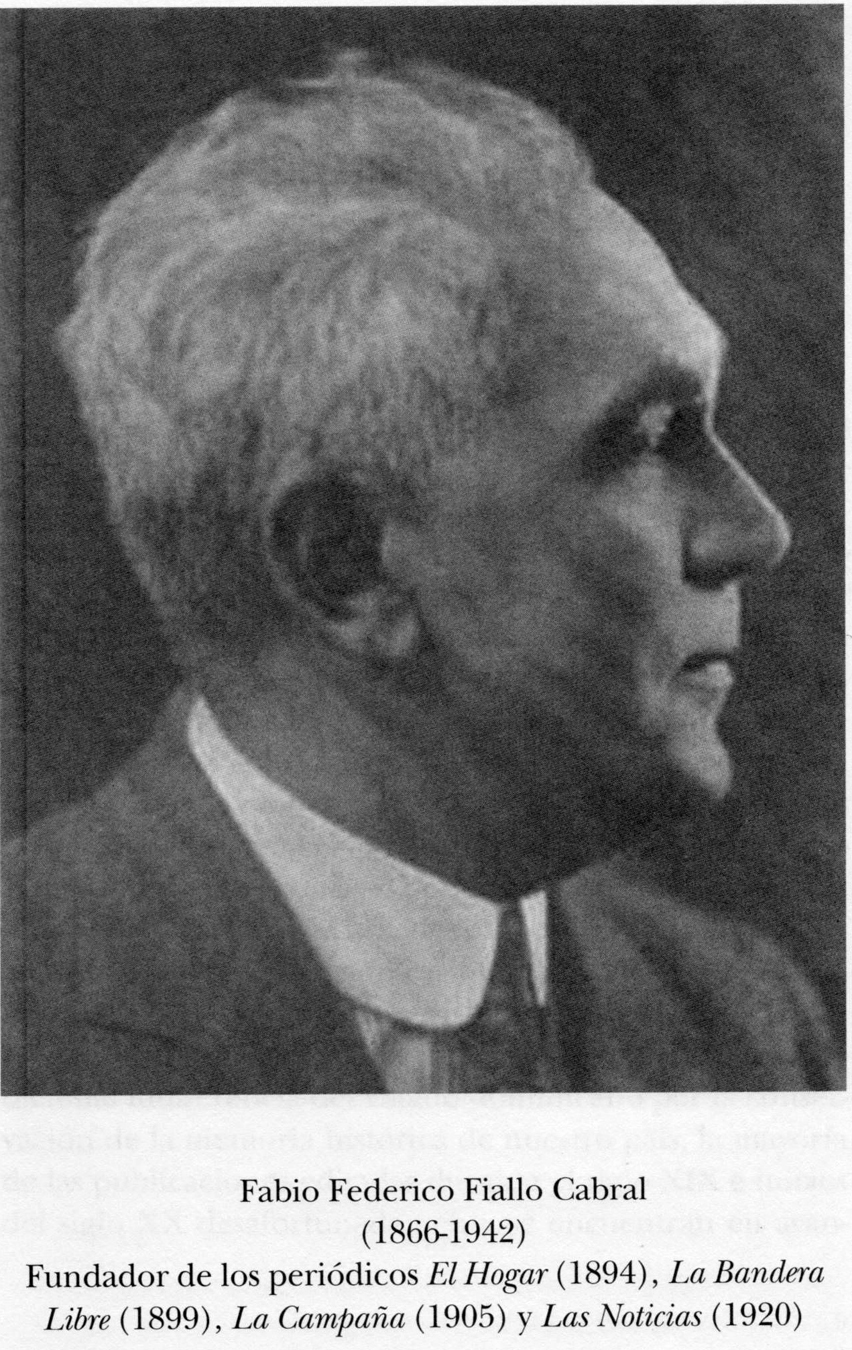
Fabio Fiallo

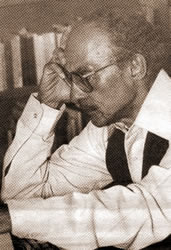
Pedro Mir

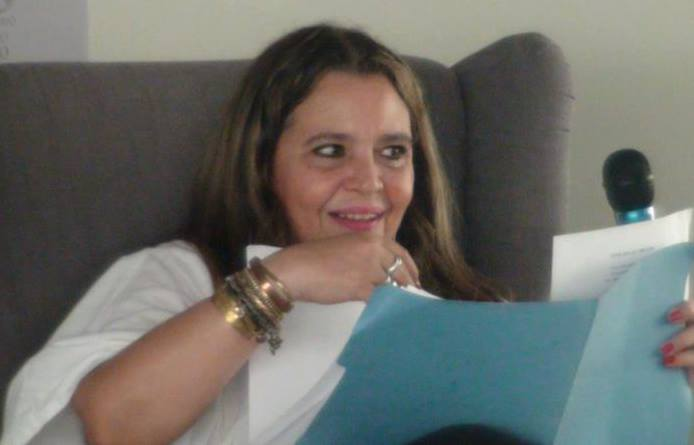
Martha Rivera Garrido

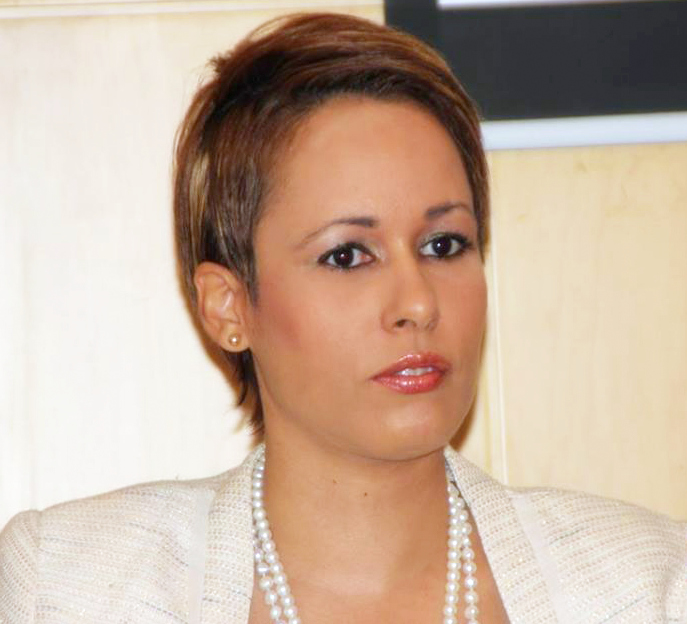
Liliane Chabot

- Julia Alvarez
- Arambilet
- Frank Báez
- Josefina Baez
- Celsa Albert Batista
- Fernando Cabrera
- Rei Berroa
- Manuel del Cabral
- Aída Cartagena Portalatín
- Roberto Cassá
- Raquel Cepeda
- Tulio Manuel Cestero
- Hilma Contreras
- Angie Cruz
- Junot Díaz
- Leonor de Ovando
- Judith Dupré
- Virginia Elena Ortea
- León Félix Batista
- Arturo Féliz-Camilo
- Fabio Fiallo
- Freddy Ginebra
- Cristino Gómez
- Chico Gonzalez
- Camila Henríquez Ureña
- Pedro Henríquez Ureña
- Federico Henríquez y Carvajal
- Angela Hernández Nuñez
- Juan Isidro Jiménez Grullón
- Rita Indiana
- Mariano Lebrón Saviñón
- Marcio Veloz Maggiolo
- José Mármol
- Andrés L. Mateo
- Félix Evaristo Mejía
- Miguel D. Mena
- Jeannette Miller
- Leopoldo Minaya
- Pedro Mir
- Domingo Moreno Jimenes
- Mateo Morrison
- Trina de Moya
- Flérida de Nolasco
- José Núñez de Cáceres
- Josefa Antonia Perdomo y Heredia
- Martha Rivera-Garrido
- Arturo Rodríguez Fernández
- Mu-Kien Adriana Sang/
- Alfredo Fernández Simó
- Salomé Ureña
- Jael Uribe
- Bernardo Vega
- Julio Vega Batlle
- Alanna Lockward
- Abelardo Vicioso
- Chiqui Vicioso
- Delia Weber

== Business ==
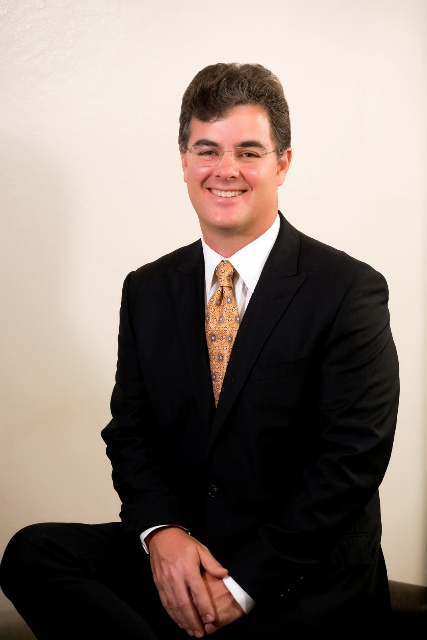
Manuel Díez Cabral.

- Marcos Bisonó – businessman
- José Blanco – cigar industrialist
- Ligia Bonetti – businesswoman
- Manuel Díez Cabral – businessman
- Juan Cohen – businessman
- José Luis Corripio – businessman
- The Franjul Family – business family
- Bartolomé Gamundi – businessman and government official in Puerto Rico
- Manuel Alejandro Grullón – businessman, president of Banco Popular
- José León Asensio – businessman
- Victor Miguel Pacheco Mendez – businessman
- Victor Oscar Pacheco Mendez – businessman
- Leo Perez Minaya – businessman
- Celso Marranzini – economist
- Porfirio Pina – music executive
- Frank Rainieri – businessman, chairman and founder of Grupo Punta Cana

== Fashion and beauty pageant personalities ==
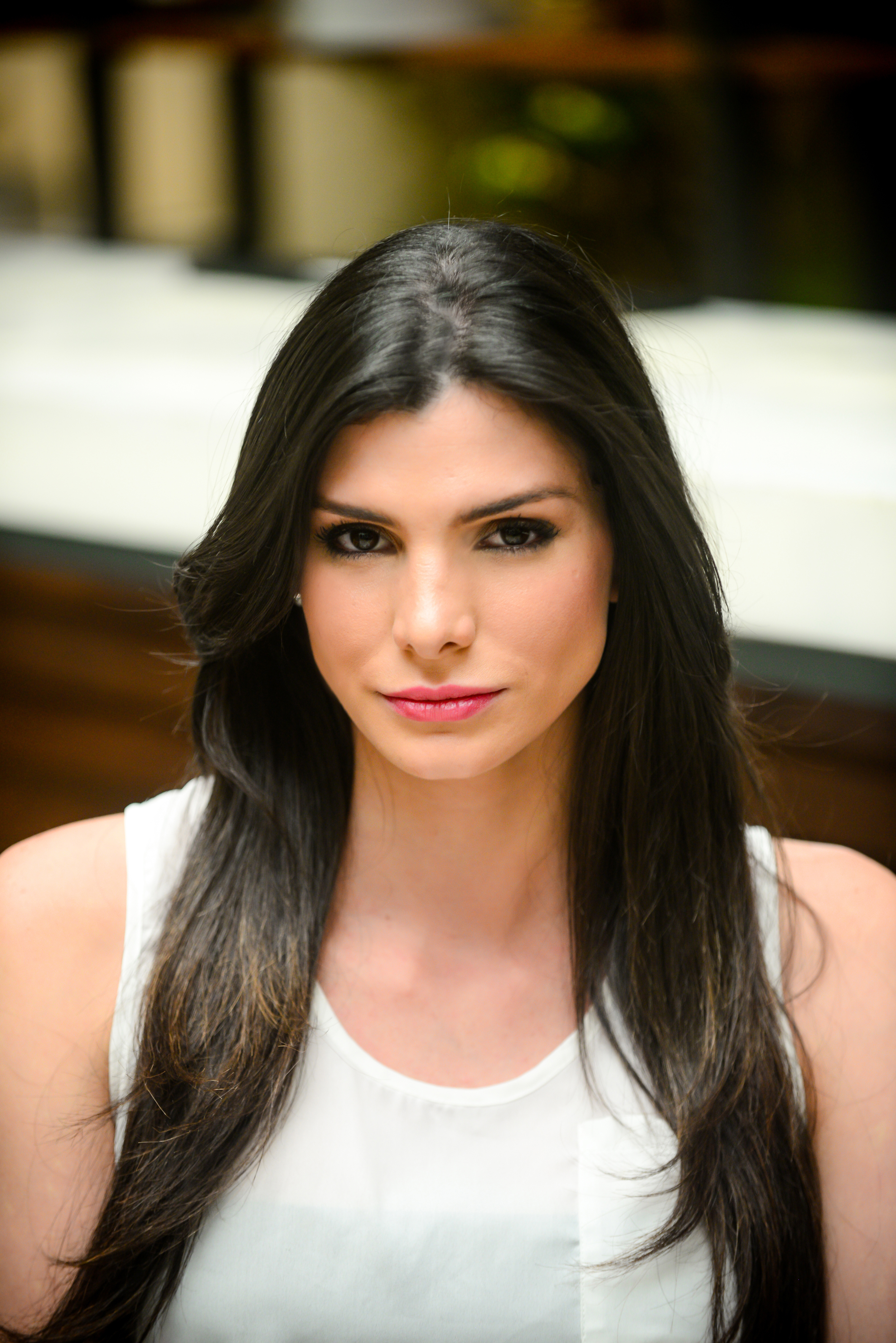
Eva Arias

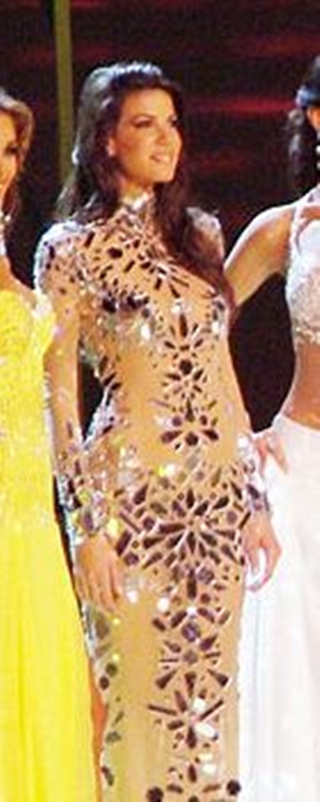
Marianne Cruz

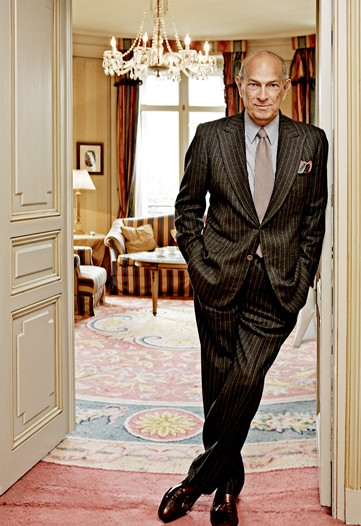
Oscar de la Renta, prominent fashion designer.

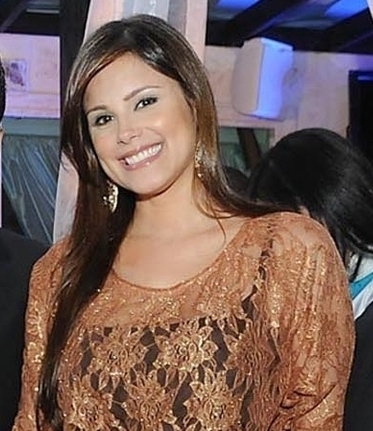
Renata Soñé

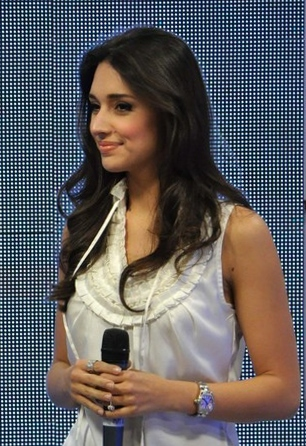
Amelia Vega.

- Mariasela Álvarez – Miss World 1982
- Eva Arias – beauty queen and fashion model
- Sully Bonnelly – fashion designer
- Susie Castillo – Miss USA 2003
- Ana Contreras – Miss World Beach beauty semifinalist
- Claudia Cruz – Miss World 2004 first runner-up
- Marianne Cruz – Miss Universe 2008 second runner-up
- Yadira Cury – Miss International 2005 first runner-up
- Ada de la Cruz – Miss Universe 2009 first runner-up
- Magali Febles – owner of the Miss Dominican Republic pageant franchise
- Kimberly Jiménez – Miss Universe 2020 fifth runner-up
- Gilda Jovine – fashion model
- Francisca Lachapel – Nuestra Belleza Latina 2015
- Hernan Lander – fashion designer
- Dulcita Lieggi – beauty pageant contestant
- Denny Méndez – Miss Italy 1997
- Clarissa Molina – Nuestra Belleza Latina 2016 V.I.P winner, Miss Dominican Republic 2015
- Ruth Ocumárez – former beauty queen
- Oscar de la Renta – fashion designer
- Amell Santana – Miss Earth 2005 first runner-up
- Samantha Sepulveda – model and policewoman
- Renata Soñé – Miss Universe 2005 second runner–up
- Arlenis Sosa – fashion model
- Amelia Vega – Miss Universe 2003, actress and model

== Motion picture and television personalities ==
=== A–M ===
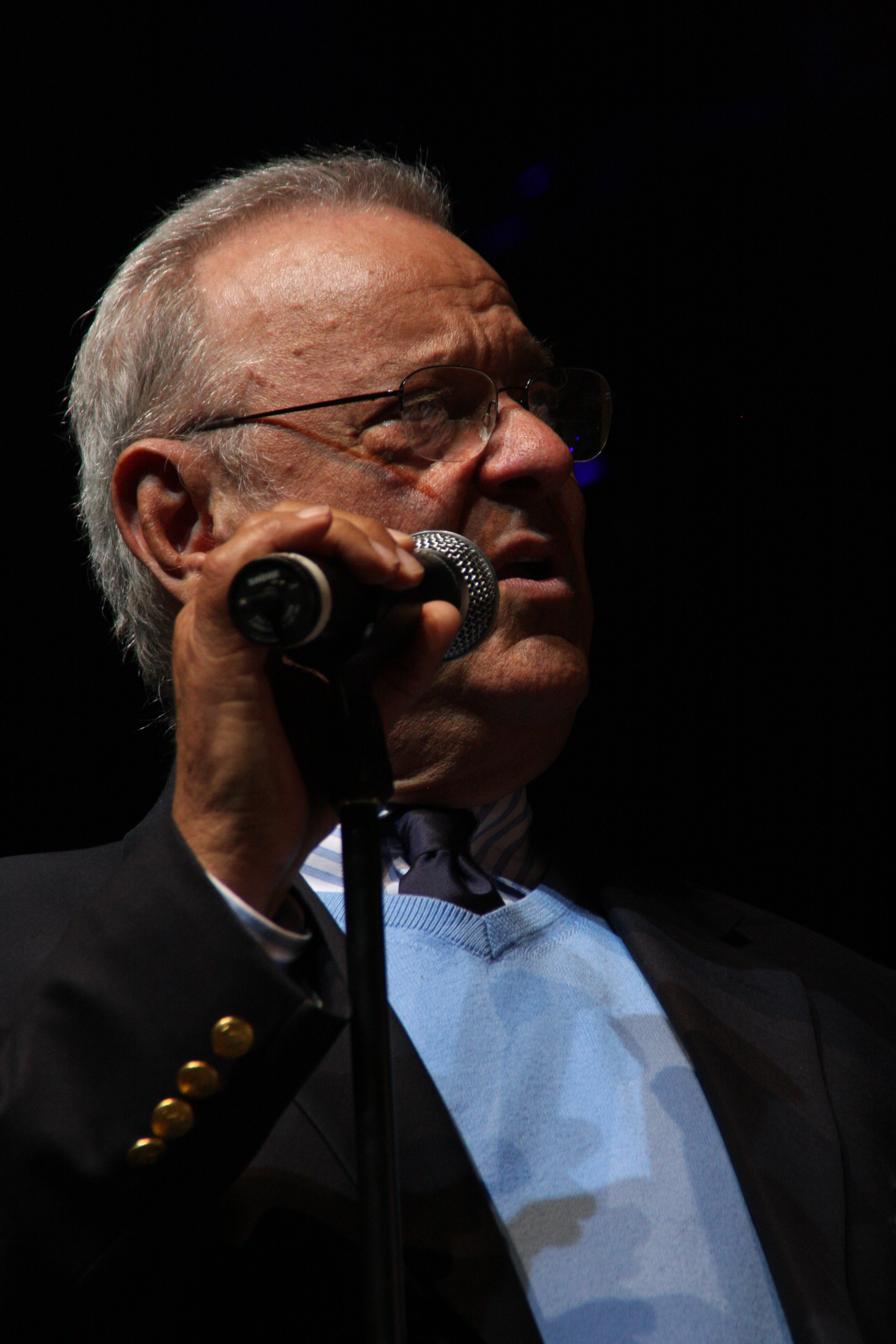
Freddy Beras-Goico

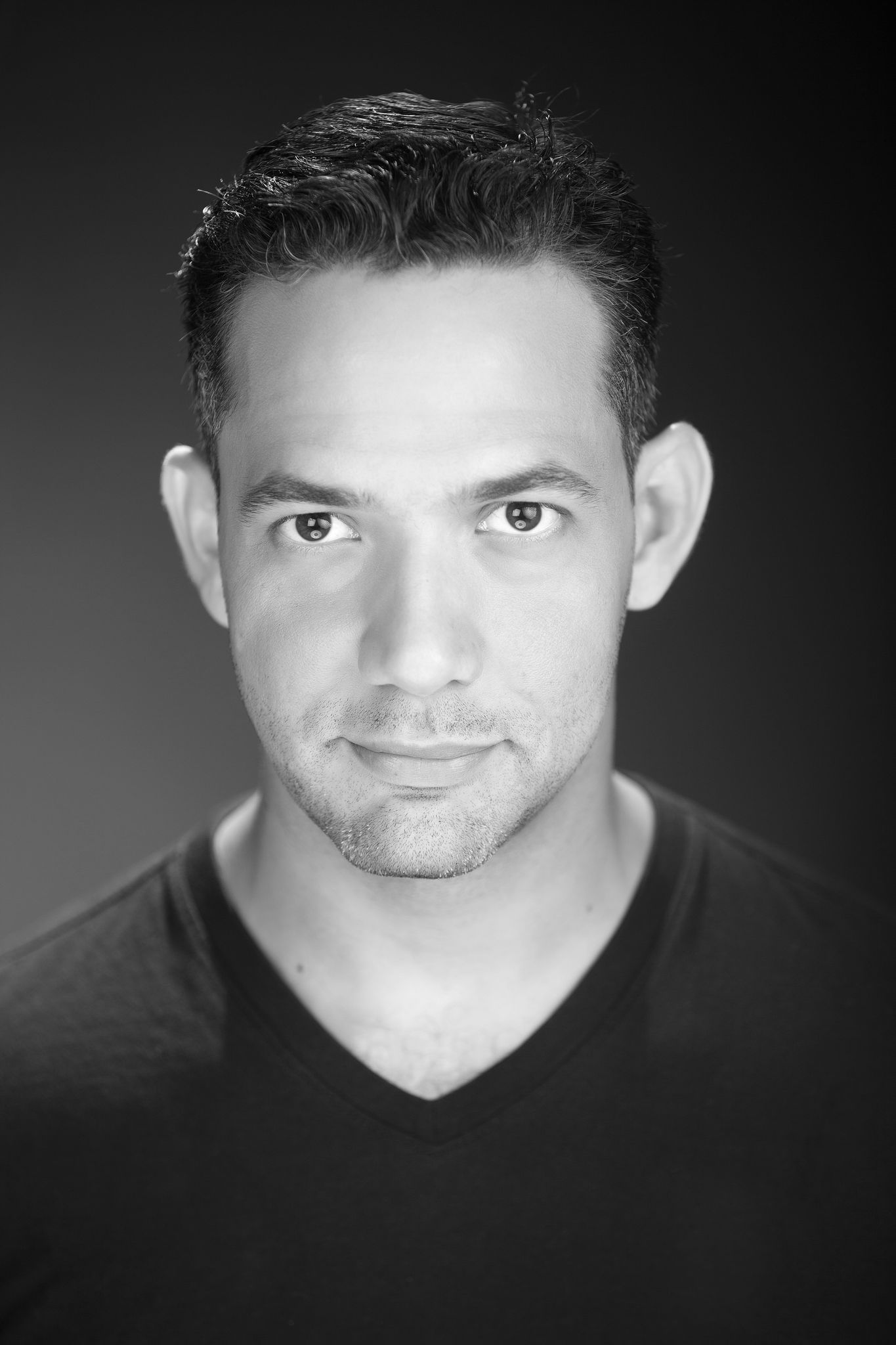
Sergio Carlo

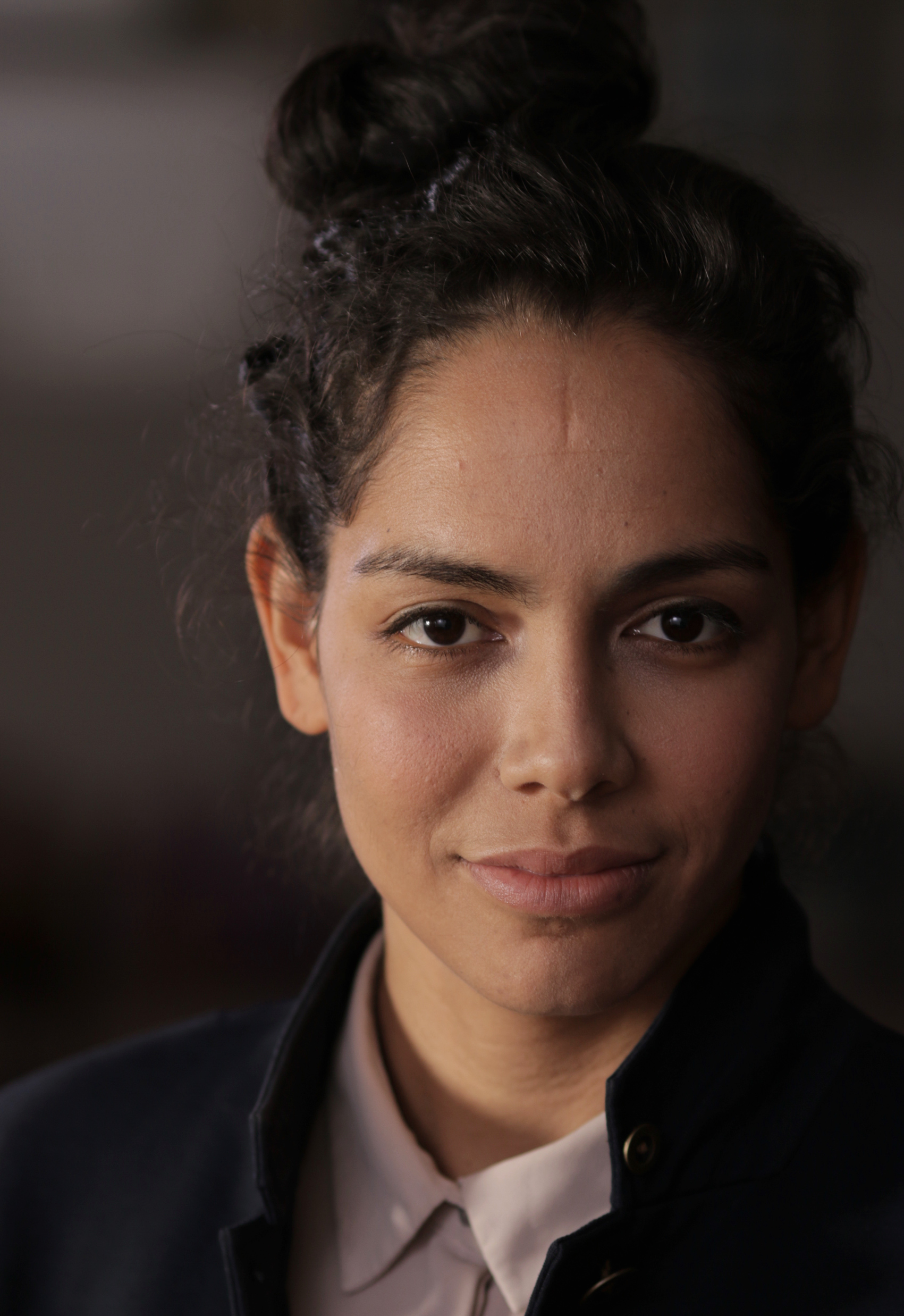
Arisleyda Dilone

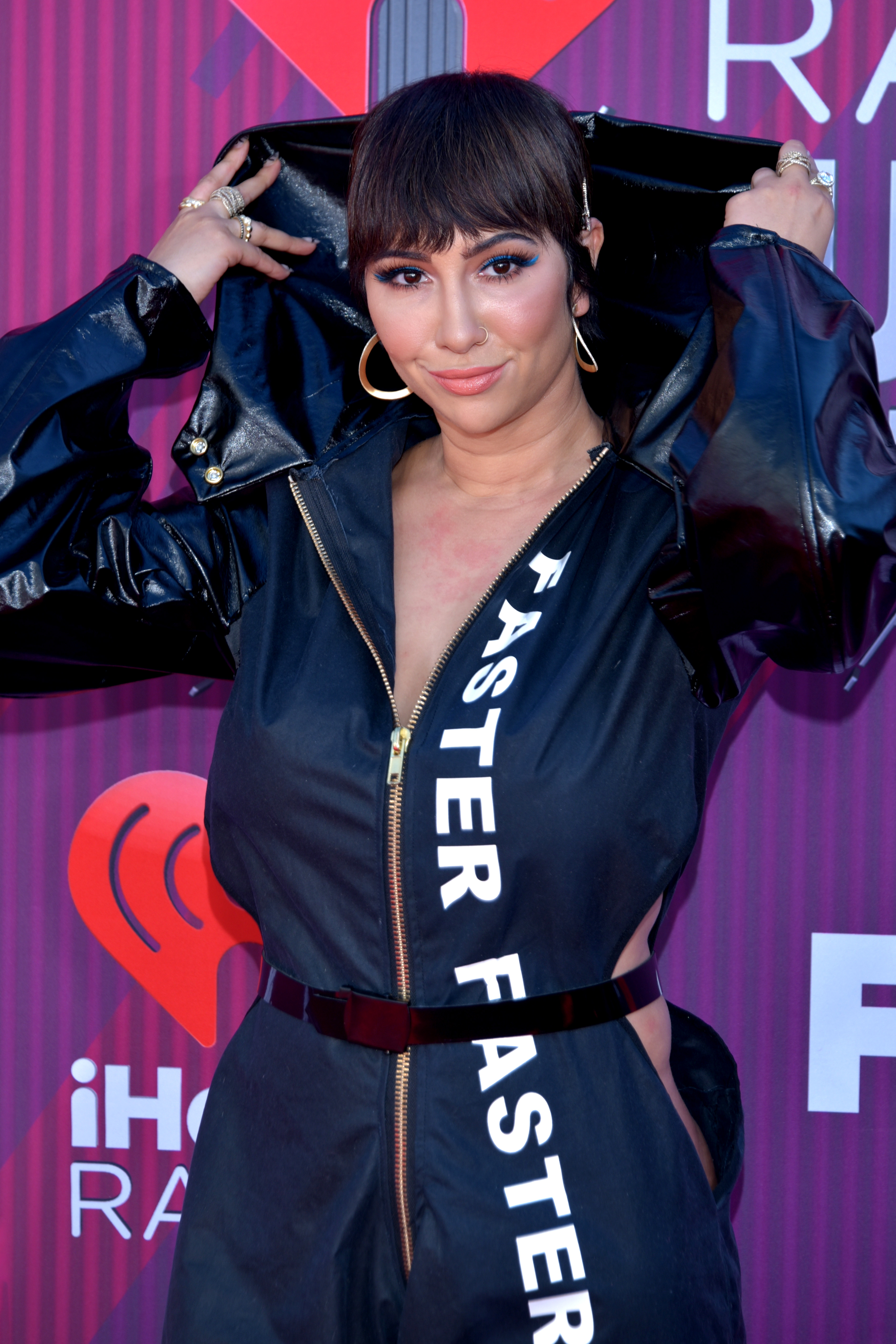
Jackie Cruz

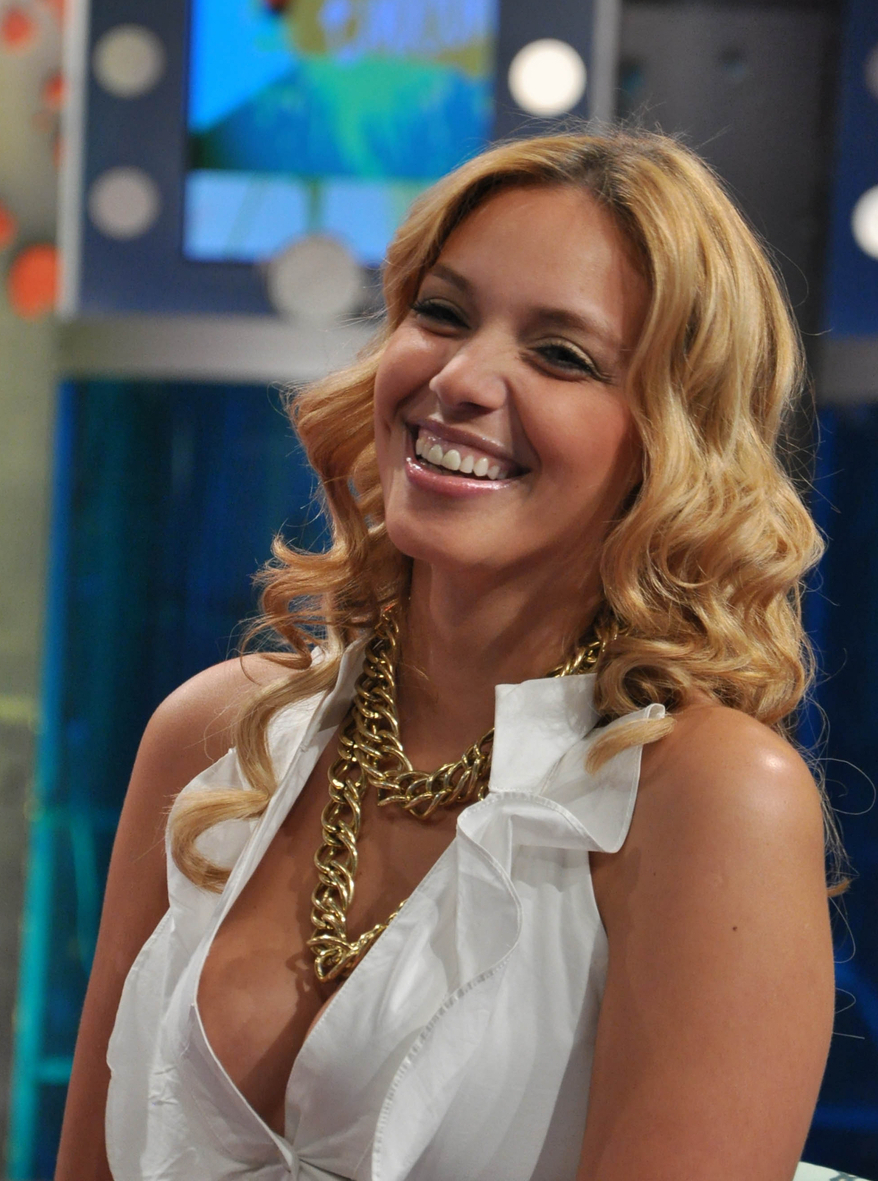
Hony Estrella

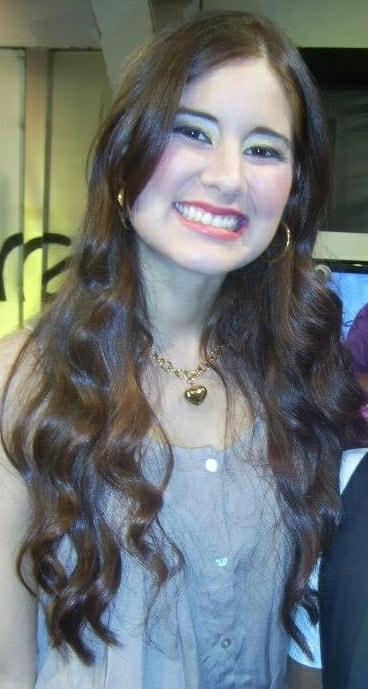
Iamdra Fermin

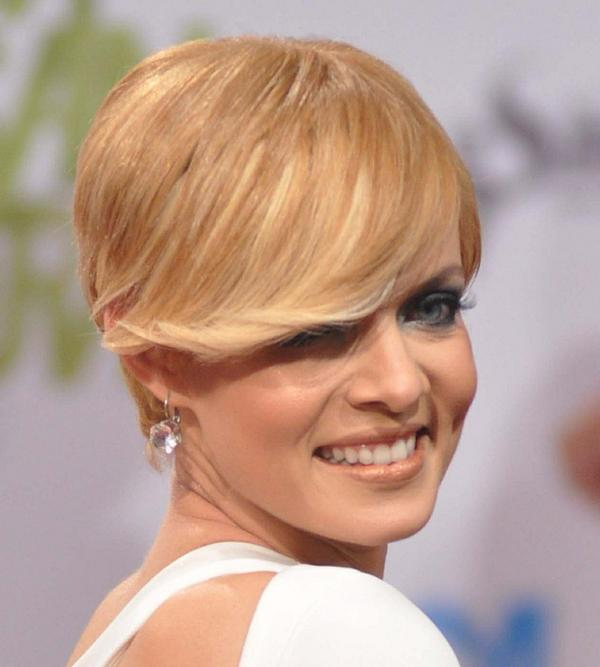
Lora

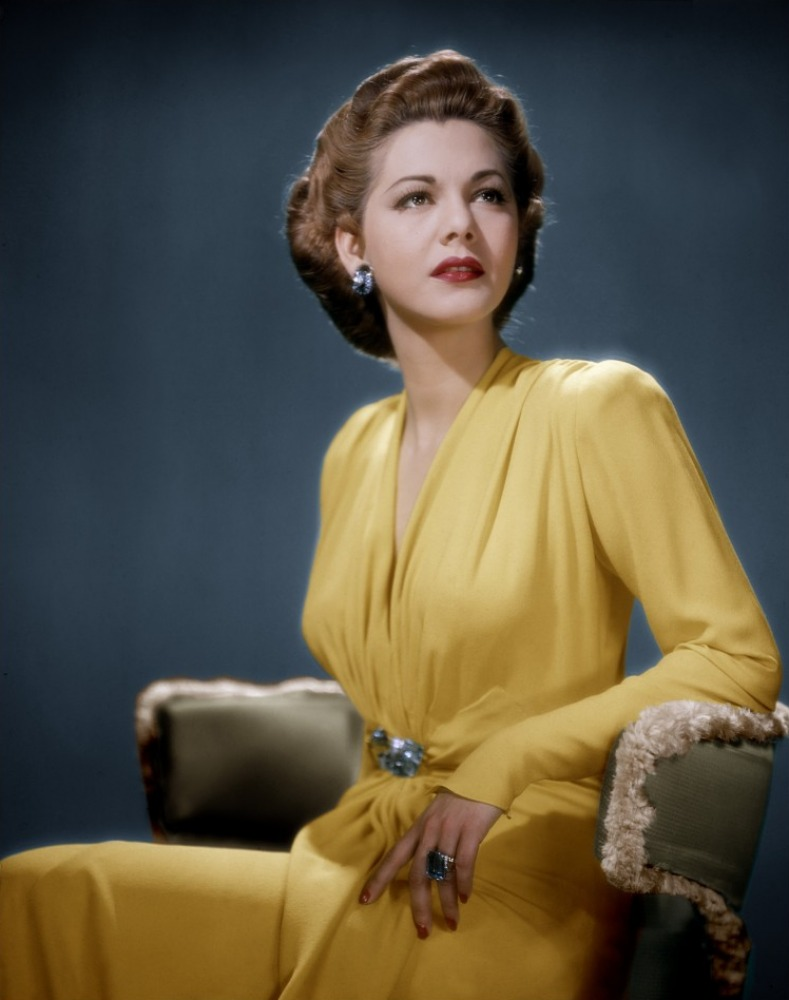
Maria Montez

- Irvin Alberti – actor
- Nancy Alvarez – psychologist, television talk show host
- Tina Aumont – film actress; daughter of Maria Montez
- Freddy Beras-Goico – television host, comedian
- Julissa Bermudez – television personality
- Jenny Blanco – TV presenter and actress
- Nashla Bogaert – actress
- Micky Bretón – director
- Francis Capra – actor
- Rafael Campos – actor
- Sergio Carlo – actor
- Aimee Carrero – actress
- Terry Carter – actor
- Hosea Chanchez – actor
- Charytín – actress, singer, television host
- José Guillermo Cortines – actor, musician
- Jackie Cruz – actress
- Tony Dandrades – TV presenter
- Juan Delancer – film director
- Yasmin Deliz – television personality/actress
- Arisleyda Dilone – actress
- Akari Endo – actress
- Hony Estrella – actress
- Iamdra Fermín – TV presenter
- Juan Fernández – actor
- Yubo Fernandez – actress
- René Fortunato – film director
- J. Teddy Garces – actor
- Andrés García – actor
- Laura García-Godoy – actress
- Jason Genao – actor from On My Block (TV series)
- Milagros Germán – actress
- Rick Gonzalez – actor
- Iván García Guerra – theater actor
- María Alejandra Guzmán – TV presenter
- Juliana Harkavy – actress (Dominican mother)
- Oscar Haza – television journalist
- Wilson Jermaine Heredia – actor
- Jharrel Jerome – actor
- Arthur Lithgow – actor
- John Lithgow - actor
- Jorge Lendeborg Jr. – actor
- Sarah Jorge León – actress
- Yelitza Lora – actress
- Bryan Lugo – actor
- Hemky Madera – actor
- Judy Marte – actress
- Luisito Martí – comedian
- Agliberto Meléndez – film director
- Mirtha Michelle – actress
- Maria Montez – actress
- Margarita Mora – actress
- Rafael Molina Morillo – journalist
- Carlos de la Mota – actor
- Patrícia Mota – actress

=== N–Z ===
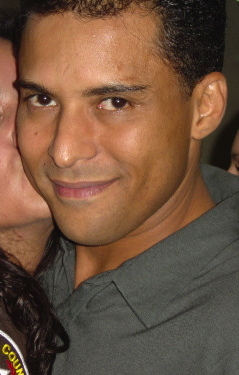
Alex Paez

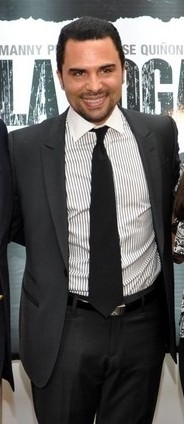
Manny Perez

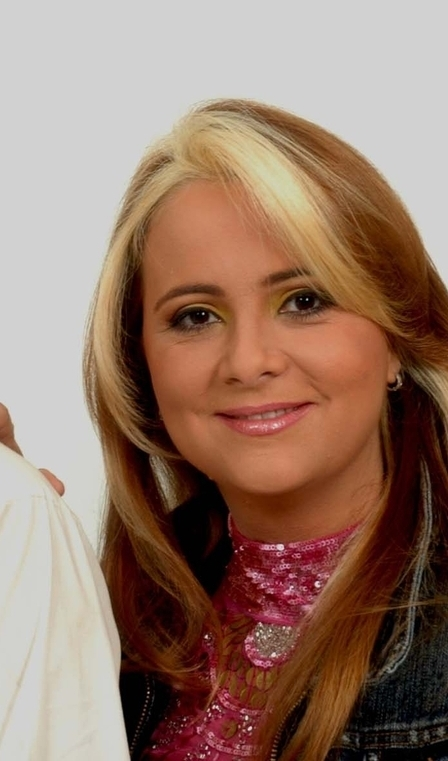
Nuria Piera

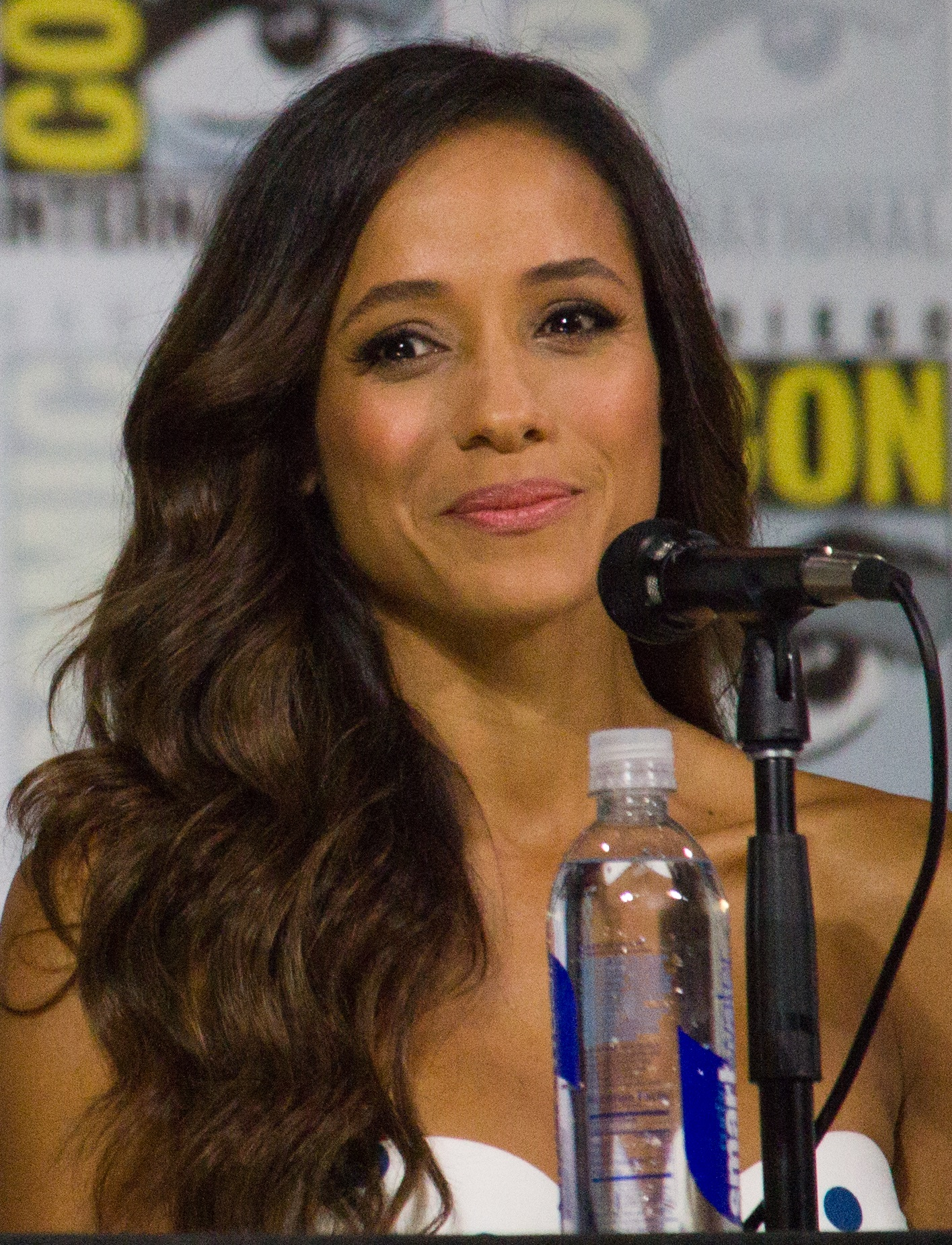
Dania Ramirez

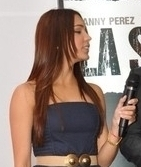
Michelle Vargas

- Amaury Nolasco – actor
- Miguel A. Núñez, Jr. – actor
- Robmariel Olea – actress
- Karen Olivo – Tony Award-winning actor
- Alex Paez – American actor of Dominican descent
- Manny Pérez – actor (films Party Monster and El Cantante)
- Frank Perozo – actor, producer
- Nuria Piera – television journalist
- Esmeralda Pimentel – telenovela actress (Dominican father)
- Jessica Pimentel – actress
- Dascha Polanco – actress (Netflix original series Orange Is the New Black)
- Rosario Prieto – actress and dancer
- Rafael José – Puerto Rican television personality (Dominican father)
- Dania Ramirez – actress (television series Heroes and Entourage)
- Silvestre Rasuk – actor
- Victor Rasuk – actor
- Monica Raymund – actress
- Judy Reyes – actress (television series Scrubs and High Potential)
- Birmania Ríos – television personality (television show Despierta America)
- Diana-Maria Riva – actress
- Carolina Rivas – actress
- Alfonso Rodríguez – film director
- Michelle Rodriguez – actress
- Julio Sabala – actor, comedian
- Roberto Salcedo, Jr. – comedian
- Zoe Saldaña – actress
- Nuryn Sanlley – comedian
- Harmony Santana – actress
- Merlin Santana – actor
- Rafael Corporán de los Santos – TV host
- Enrique Segoviano – producer, director
- Sharlene Taulé – actress and singer (Dominican father, Puerto Rican mother)
- Rosanna Tavarez – singer, television personality
- Shannon Tavarez – Broadway actress and singer; Dominican father
- Samir Saba – journalist, TV presenter
- Marianly Tejada – actress, model and former beauty queen who is Miss Mundo Dominicana 2011
- Jessy Terrero – director
- Leticia Tonos – director
- Celines Toribio – actress/model
- Emily Tosta – actress
- Isaac Saviñón – actor
- Julian Scott Urena – actor
- Vielka Valenzuela – talk show host
- Michelle Vargas – actress, model
- Denise Vasi – actress
- Jamila Velazquez – actress
- James Victor – actor
- Juan Vidal – actor
- Ludo Vika – actress, comedian
- Tristan Wilds – actor
- Carmen Wong Ulrich – journalist
- Sandra Zaiter – actress and television host

== Painters and artists ==
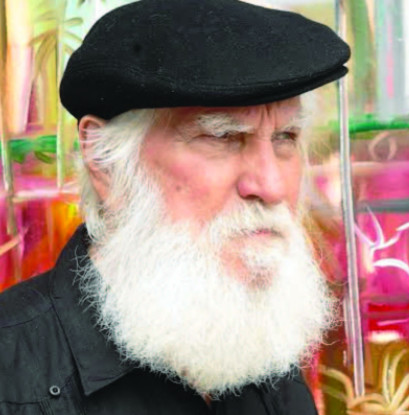
Guillo Perez

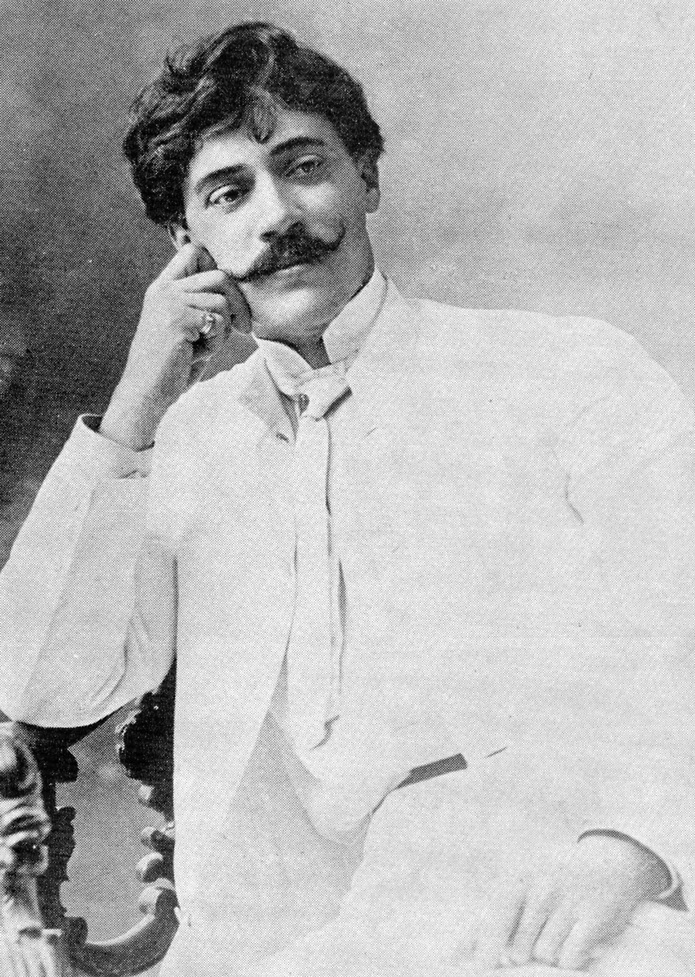
Abelardo Rodríguez Urdaneta.

- Oscar Abreu
- Cándido Bidó
- Monina Cámpora – artist
- Tito Canepa
- Jaime Colson
- José García Cordero
- Luis Desangles
- Iliana Emilia Garcia
- Diego José Hilaris – painter
- Henri-Joseph de Forestier – painter
- Paul Giudicelli
- Aurelio Grisanty
- Gilberto Hernández Ortega
- Clara Ledesma
- Tania Marmolejo
- Yoryi Morel
- Elsa Núñez
- Raquel Paiewonsky
- Olivia Peguero
- Rigo Peralta
- Guillo Pérez
- Eligio Pichardo
- Kenny Rivero
- Abelardo Rodríguez Urdaneta
- Amaya Salazar
- Jorge Noceda Sanchez
- Julia Santos Solomon
- Darío Suro
- Rosa Tavarez
- Francisco Velásquez
- Miguel Vila Luna
- Celeste Woss y Gil

== Political and military figures ==
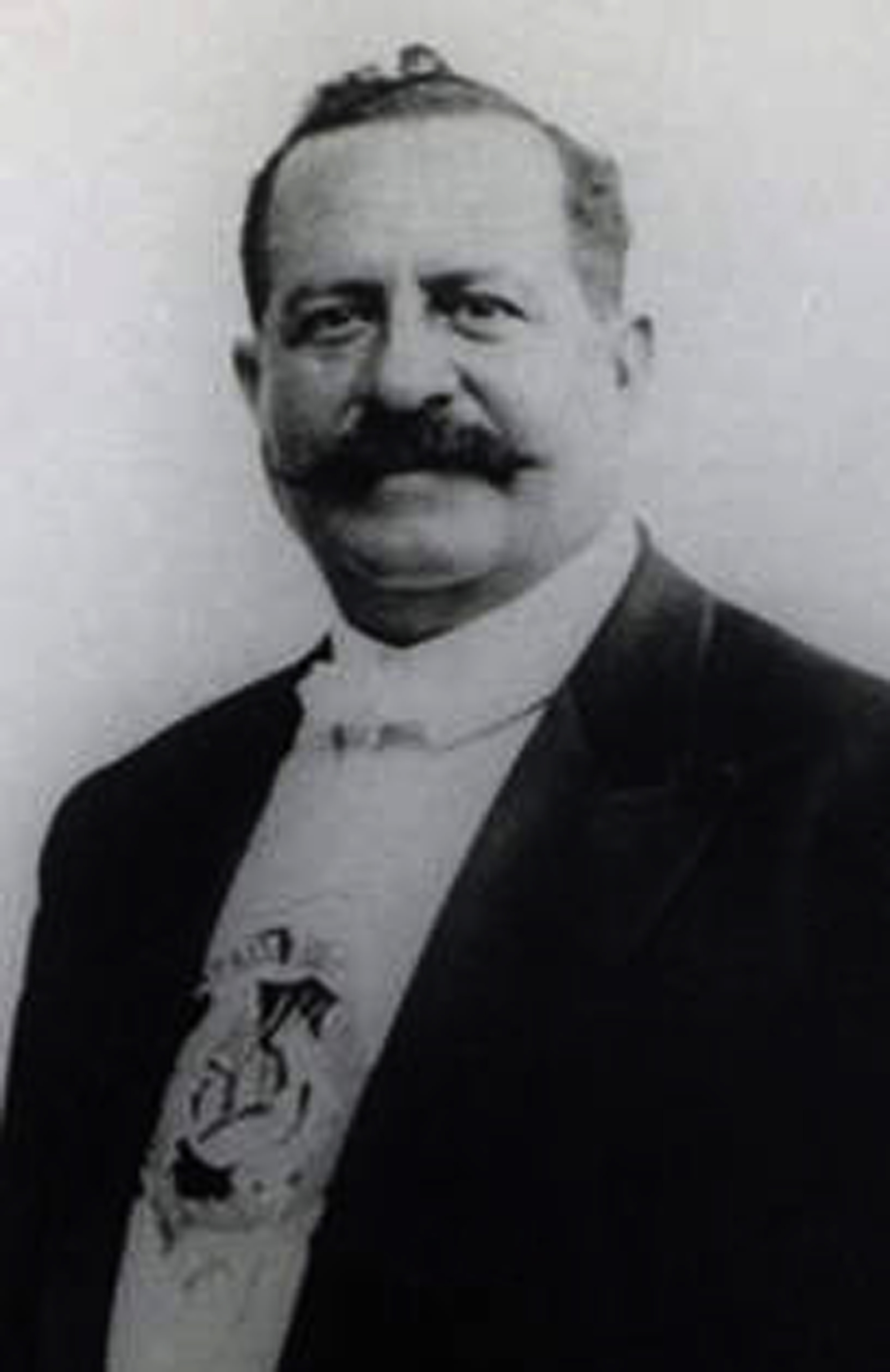
Ramon Caceres

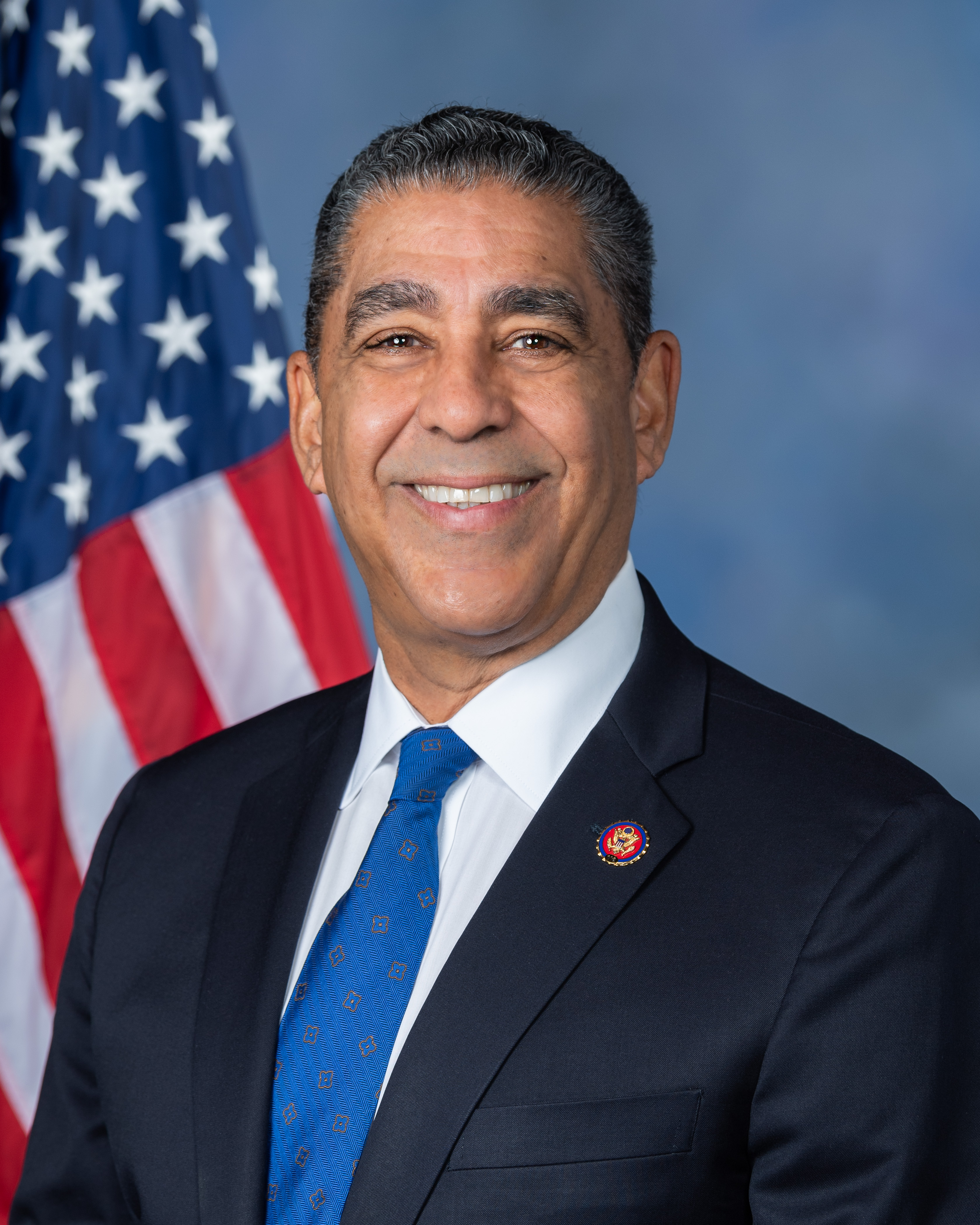
Adriano Espaillat, U.S. Congressman.

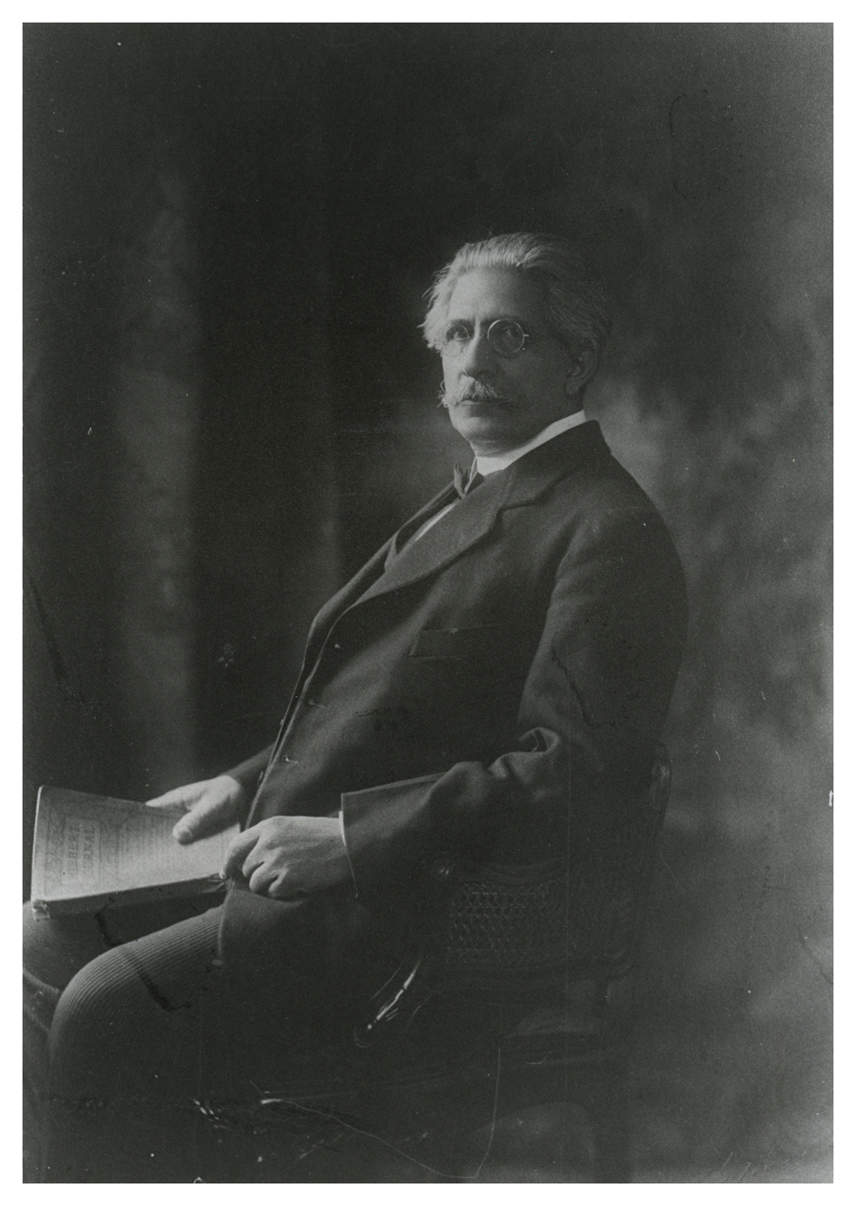
Francisco Henríquez y Carvajal

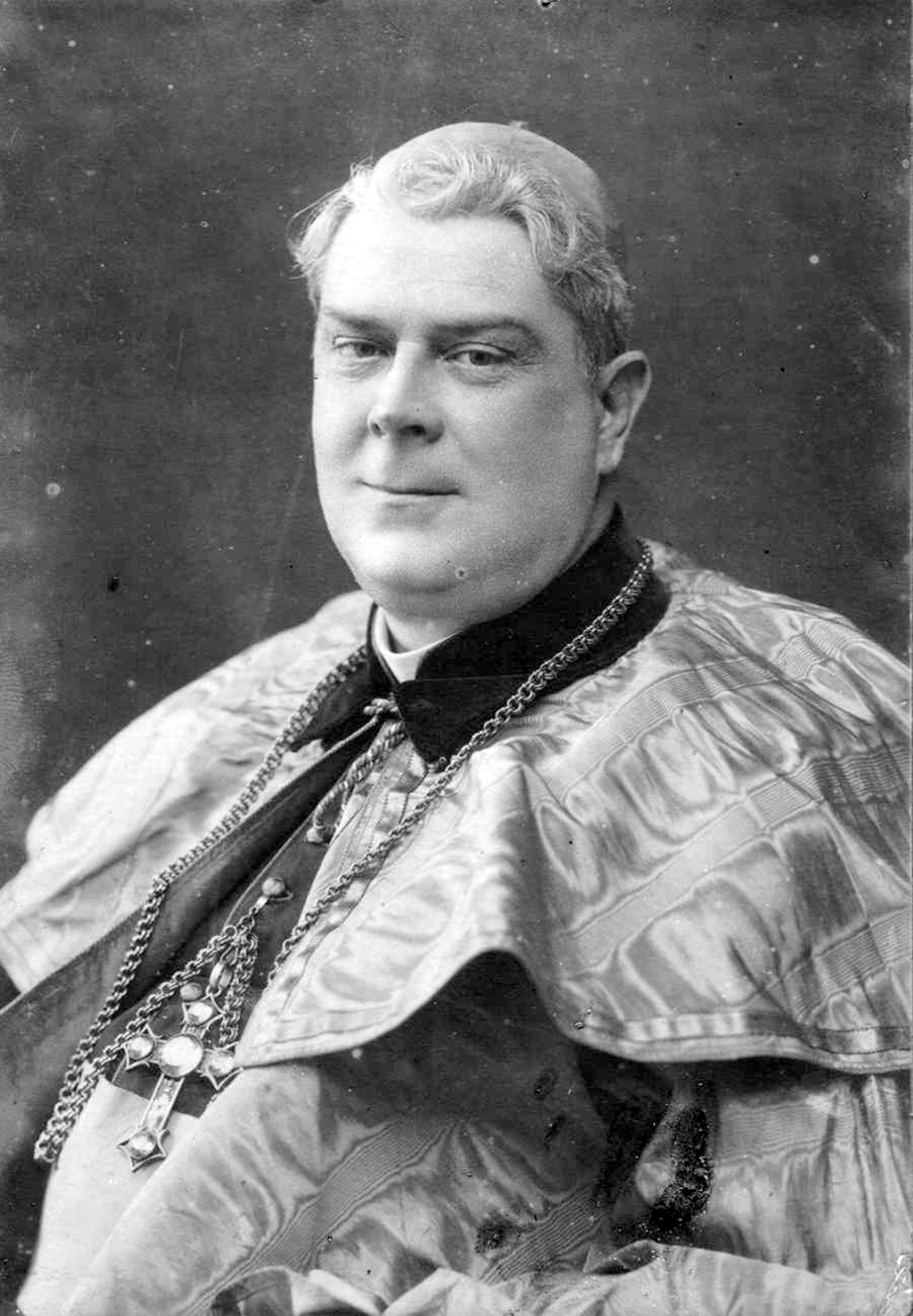
Adolfo Alejandro Nouel

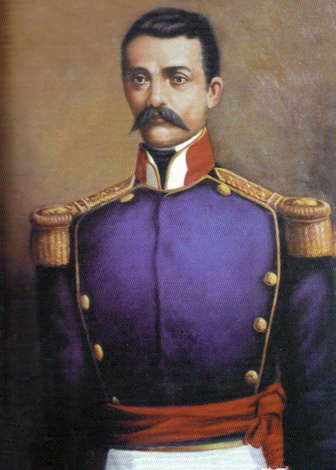
Ramon Matias Mella

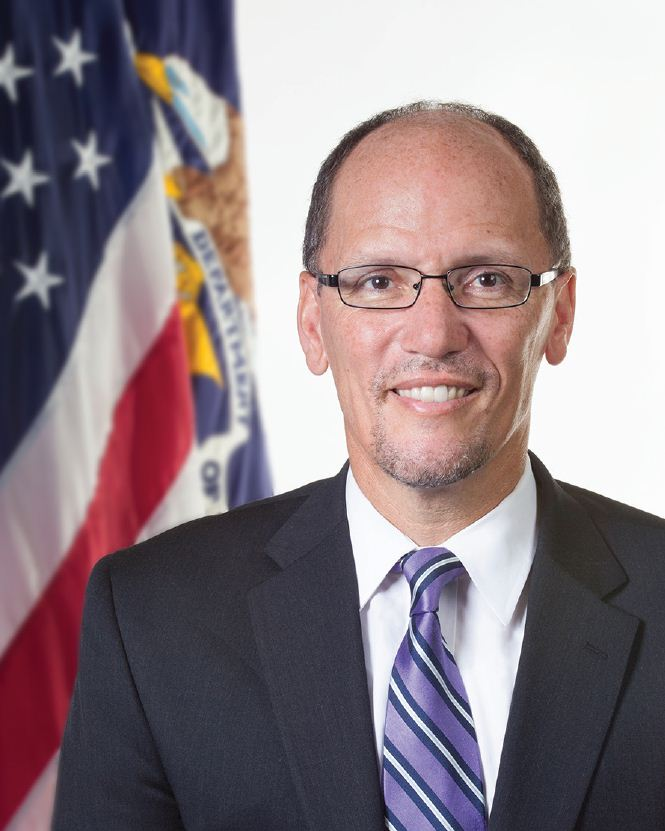
Thomas Edward Perez, Chairman of Democratic Party in the U.S.

- Rafael Alburquerque – former vice president
- Pedro Franco Badía – former Secretary of the Interior and Police
- Buenaventura Báez Méndez – former president
- Joaquín Balaguer Ricardo – former president (1960–1962, 1966–1978, 1986–1996)
- Ramón Emeterio Betances – founder of Puerto Rican independence movement (Dominican father)
- Salvador Jorge Blanco – former president (1982–1986)
- Tomás Bobadilla – first ruler of the Dominican Republic
- Juan Bosch y Gaviño – former president
- Francisco Domínguez Brito – lawyer, politician
- Francisco Alberto Caamaño Deñó – former president
- Fernando Cabrera – New York City Councilman
- Ramón Cáceres – former president
- Margarita Cedeño de Fernández – vice-president and former First Lady of the Dominican Republic
- David Collado – former mayor of Santo Domingo
- Lorraine Cortés-Vázquez – 65th Secretary of State of New York
- Héctor Díaz-Polanco – former president of Congress of Mexico City
- Juan Pablo Duarte – one of the founding fathers of the Dominican Republic
- Adriano Espaillat – U.S. Congressman; first Dominican-American, and first formerly undocumented immigrant, to serve in the U.S. Congress, and formerly first Dominican-American to be elected to a State House in the U.S.
- Rafael Espinal – New York State Assemblyman
- Rafael Estrella Ureña – former president
- Carlos Felipe Morales – former president
- Ruy Fernández de Fuenmayor – Colonial governor of Venezuela
- Leonel Fernández Reyna – former president (1996–2000, 2004–2008, 2008–2012)
- Pedro Florentino – hero of the Battle of Jacuba, during the War of Independence from Haiti
- Maximiliano Gómez – revolutionary political leader
- Máximo Gómez – military commander of the Cuban War of Independence
- Petronila Angélica Gómez – feminist
- Antonio Guzmán Fernández – former president
- Francisco Henríquez y Carvajal – former president, as well as medical doctor, lawyer, writer, and educator
- Ulises Heureaux – former president
- Antonio Imbert Barrera – former president
- Gregorio Luperón – former president
- Miguel Martinez – former New York City Councilman
- Sabina Matos – lieutenant governor of Rhode Island
- Danilo Medina – former president (2012–2016)
- Lucia Medina – accountant and politician
- Hipólito Mejía – former president
- Ramón Matías Mella – one of the founding fathers of the Dominican Republic
- Fernando Arturo de Meriño – politician, theologian
- The Mirabal sisters – political dissidents
- Ilana Neumann – politician and lawyer
- Adolfo Alejandro Nouel – Santo Domingo archbishop and interim president
- José Nuñez-Melo – Canadian politician
- José Francisco Peña Gómez – mayor of Santo Domingo (1982–1986)
- Joseline Peña-Melnyk – member of the Maryland General Assembly
- Cesar A. Perales – 67th Secretary of State of New York
- Thomas Perez – civil rights lawyer
- Eusebio Puello – soldier and commander
- José Joaquín Puello – general and politician
- Donald Reid Cabral – former president
- Ydanis Rodríguez – New York City councilman
- José Antonio (Pepillo) Salcedo – first president after the Restoration of the Dominican Republic
- Roberto Salcedo, Sr. – mayor of Santo Domingo (2002–2016)
- Juan Sánchez Ramírez – military general
- Jean Alain Rodríguez Sánchez – lawyer
- Francisco del Rosario Sánchez – one of the founding fathers of the Dominican Republic
- Pedro Santana Familias – first president (1844)
- Luis Colón, 1st Duke of Veragua – nobleman, grandson of Christopher Columbus
- José Del Castillo Saviñón – politician
- Sergia Elena de Séliman – politician
- Juan Suero – soldier and commander
- Angel Taveras – mayor of Providence, Rhode Island
- Carlos Morales Troncoso – former vice president, diplomat
- Rafael Leónidas Trujillo – dictator (1930–1961)
- Ramfis Trujillo – general and son of dictator Rafael Leónidas Trujillo
- Francisco Urena – Massachusetts government official
- Fernando Valerio – hero of the battles of Santiago (1844) and Sabana Larga (1856), during the War of Independence from Haiti
- Geovanny Vicente – political strategist and CNN columnist
- Elias Wessin y Wessin – former general

For a complete list, please refer to List of presidents of the Dominican Republic

== Scientists and scholars ==
Victor A. Carreno

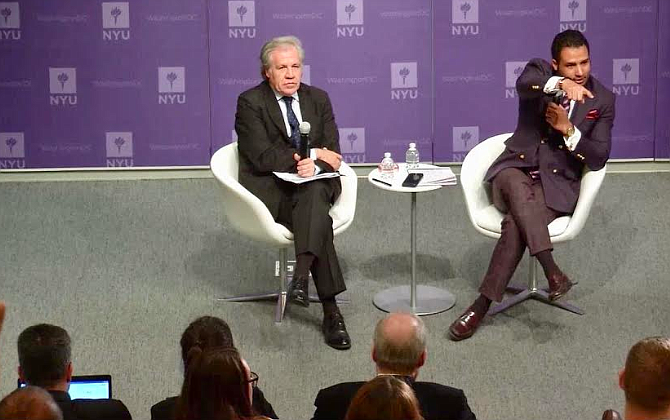
CNN columnist and Columbia University professor Geovanny Vicente Romero.

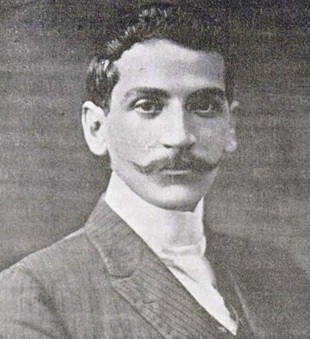
Dr. Arístides Fiallo Cabral

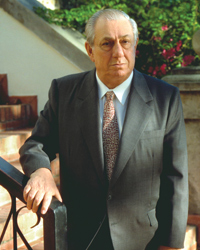
Jorge Abraham Hazoury

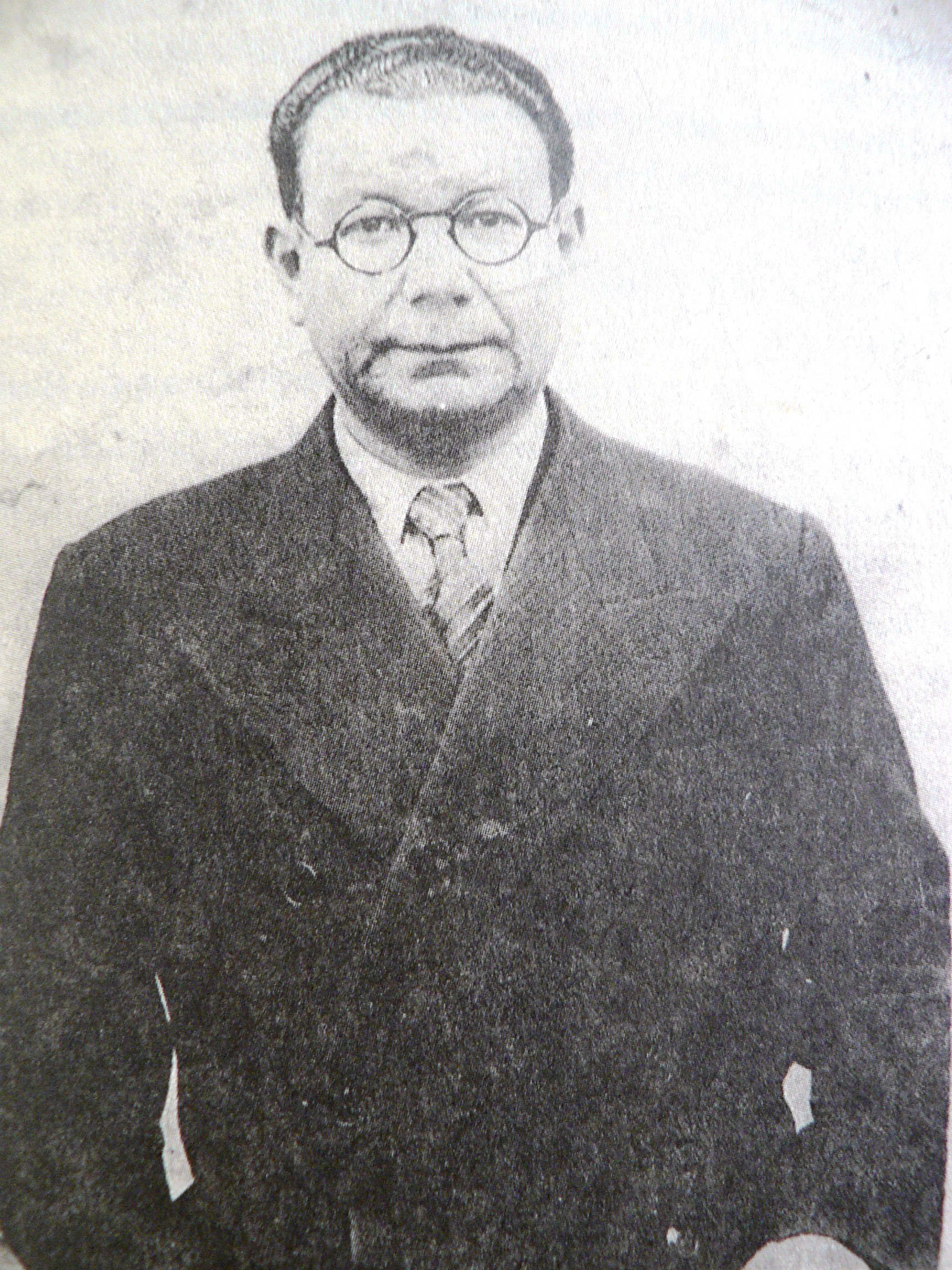
Miguel Canela Lazaro

- Soraya Aracena – anthropologist
- Idelisa Bonnelly – marine biologist
- Víctor A. Carreño – NASA aerospace engineer
- Marcos Espinal – epidemiologist
- Luis Arístides Fiallo Cabral – astronomer
- Geovanny Vicente – political scientist, CNN columnist and Columbia University professor.
- Pedro Francisco Bonó – sociologist
- Zoilo H. Garcia – aviator, engineer
- Juan Isidro Jiménez Grullón – historian
- Jorge Abraham Hazoury – biologist
- Erich E. Kunhardt – physicist
- Jose Gabriel Garcia – historian
- Jorge Giordani – engineer, economist
- Miguel Canela Lázaro – anatomist
- Kathleen Martínez – archeologist
- Frank Moya Pons – historian
- Andrés Navarro – architect
- Feniosky Peña-Mora – engineer
- Margot Taule – architect
- Juan Manuel Taveras Rodríguez – radiologist
- Héctor Valdez Albizu – economist
- Aída Mencía Ripley – academic

== Singers and musicians ==
=== A–M ===
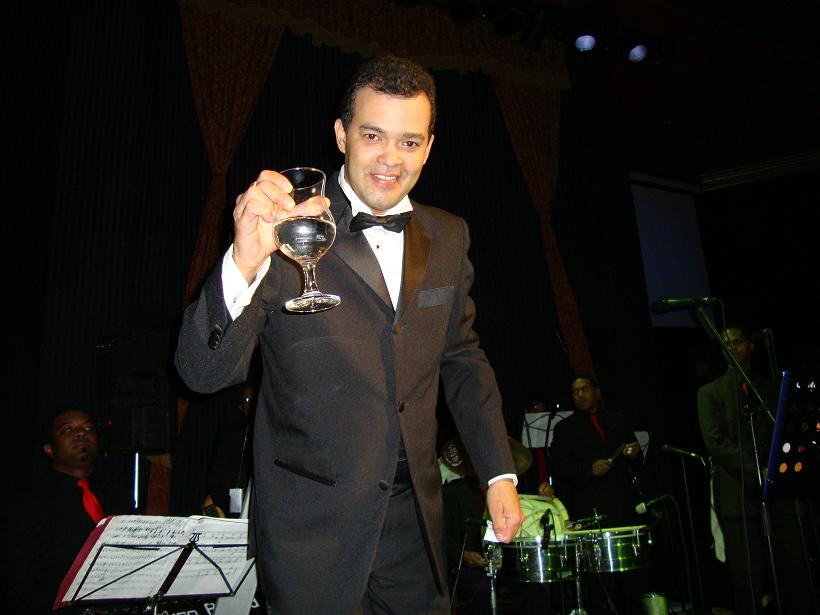
Alex Bueno

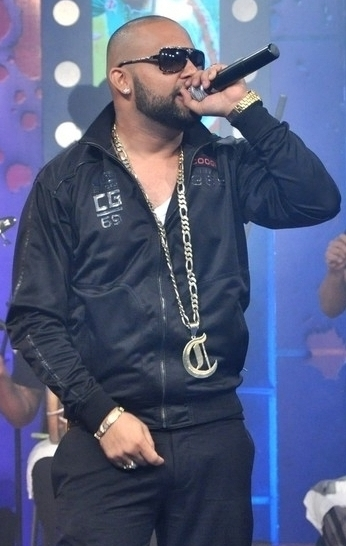
El Cata

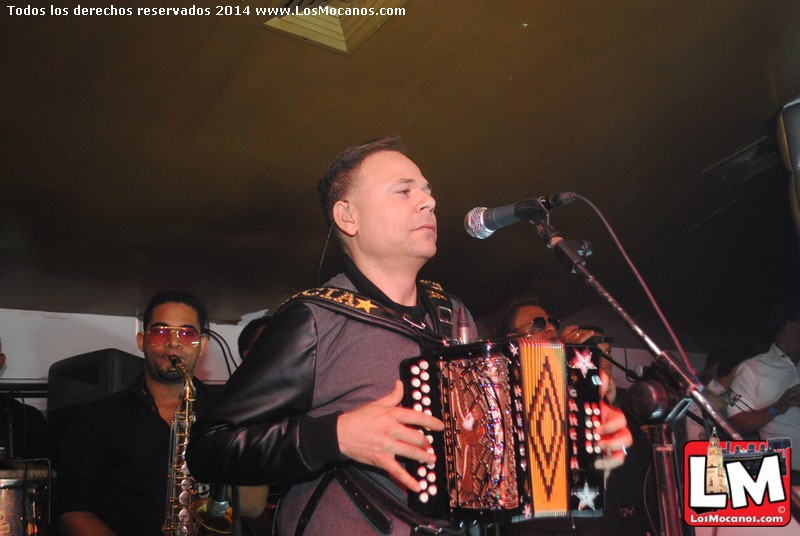
El Prodigio

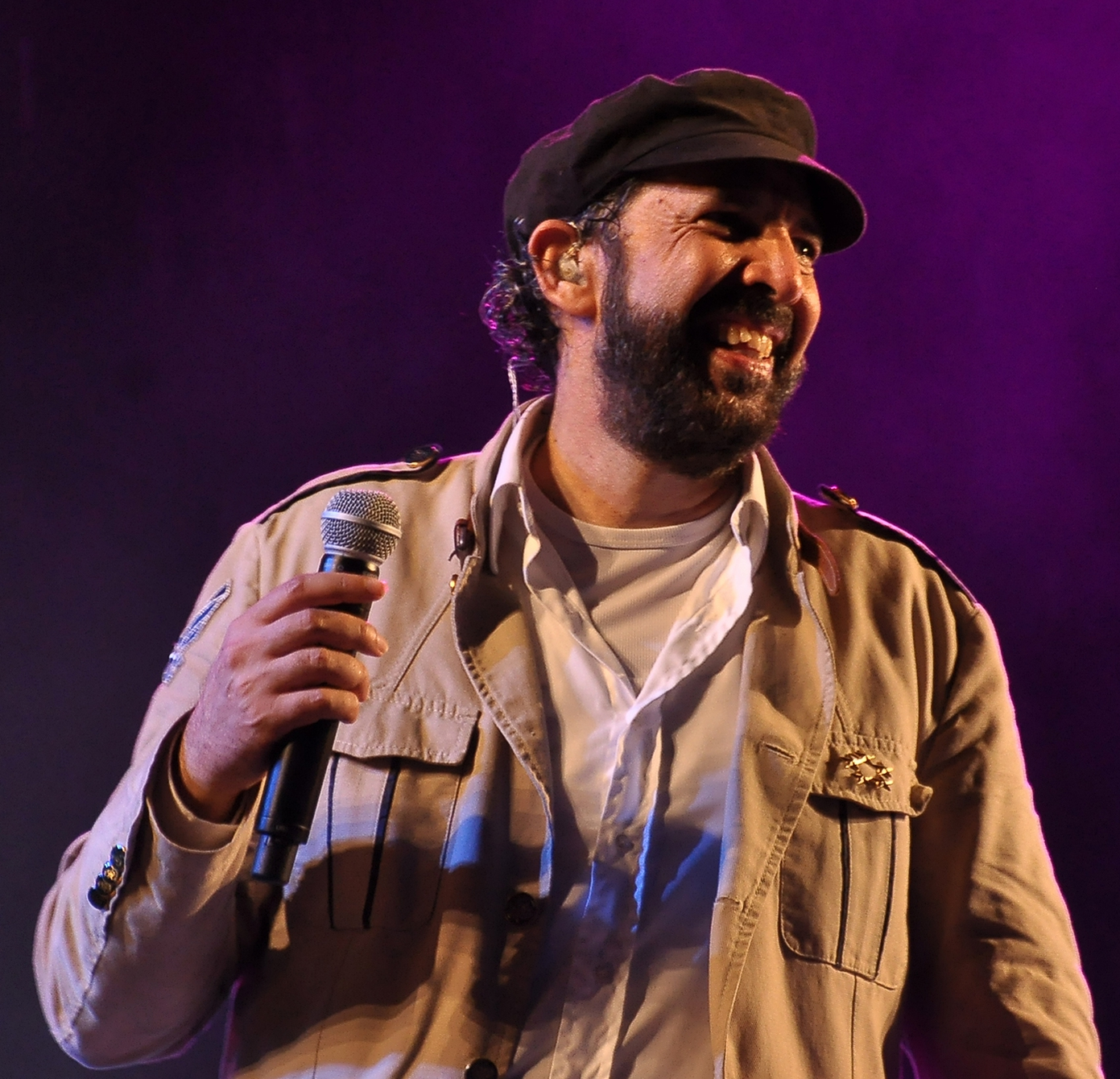
Juan Luis Guerra

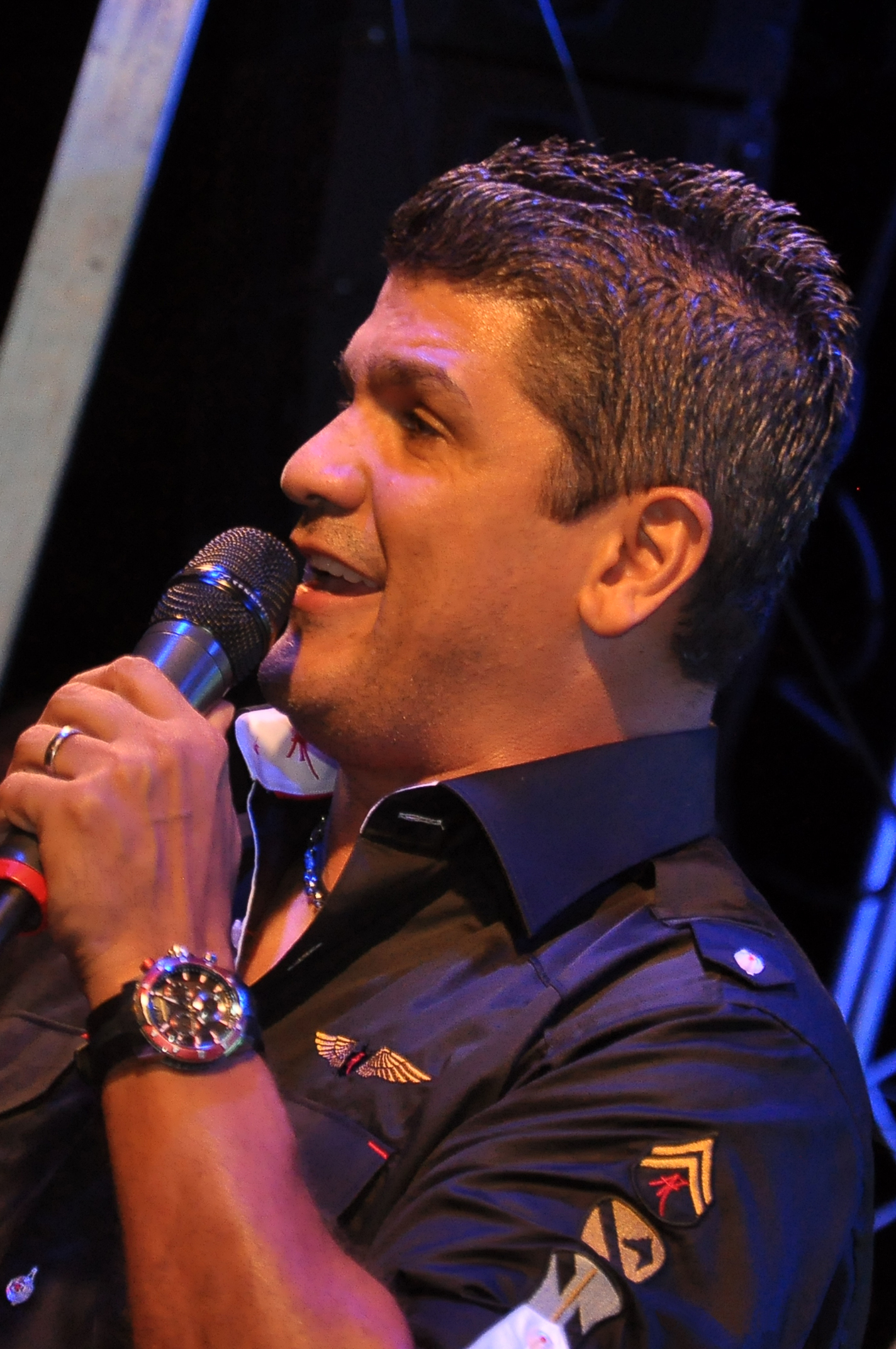
Eddy Herrera

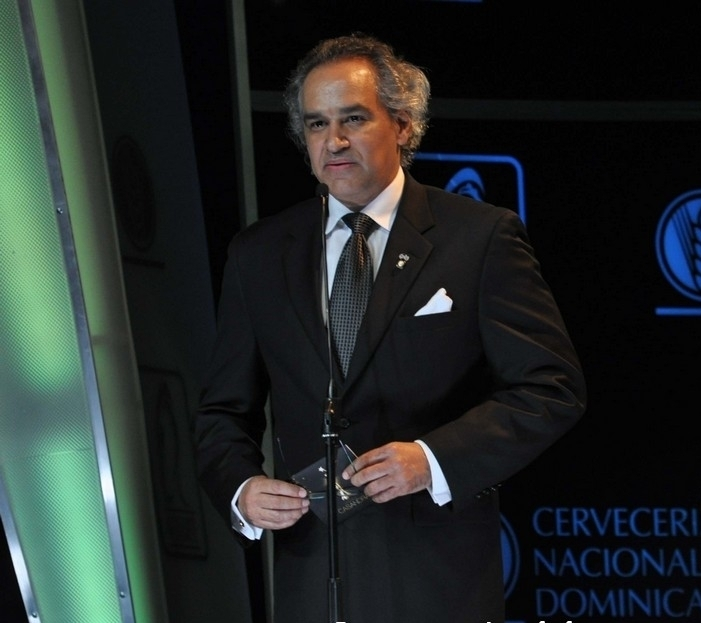
Jose Antonio Molina

- Héctor Acosta – bachata/merengue singer
- Cyrille Aimée – jazz musician (French father, Dominican mother)
- Manny Albam – jazz musician
- Luis Alberti – merengue musician
- José Alberto "El Canario" – salsa singer
- Cardi B – rapper (Dominican father, Trinidadian mother)
- El Alfa – rapper
- Juan Bautista Alfonseca – military officer, composer
- Anaís – pop singer
- Andy Andy – singer
- Ice Spice – rapper (African-American father, Dominican mother)
- Arcángel – reggaeton artist
- Aventura – bachata group
- AZ – rapper (African-American mother, Dominican father)
- José Peña Suazo – Merengue singer
- 070 Shake – rapper
- Sexappeal – salsa singer
- Lope Balaguer – singer
- Kirko Bangz – rapper (African American, Mexican and Dominican)
- Ivan Barias – music producer
- Eduardo Brito – baritone singer
- Ninón Lapeiretta de Brouwer – female composer
- Alex Bueno – merengue/bachata singer
- Nini Caffaro – singer
- José Manuel Calderón – bachata musician
- Michel Camilo – jazz pianist
- Angela Carrasco – singer
- Israel Casado – merengue instrumentalist
- Aisha Syed Castro – violinist
- Bonny Cepeda – merengue singer
- Las Chicas del Can
- Javier Colon – singer and winner of the first season of U.S. reality series The Voice (Dominican father, Puerto Rican mother)
- Charles Connor – rhythm and blues drummer
- Coro – freestyle singer/actor (American born Cuban and Dominican)
- Cristal Marie – Latin pop singer-songwriter
- Damirón – pianist and composer
- Casandra Damirón – folk singer
- Kat DeLuna – singer
- Joe Blandino – singer-songwriter
- DJ Prostyle – hip hop DJ
- Danielle Balbuena – rapper
- DaniLeigh – singer
- Don Miguelo – reggaeton artist
- Dave East – rap artist
- El Cata – merengue musician
- El Jeffrey – merengue singer
- El Prodigio – accordionist
- Jackeline Estevez – pop singer
- Bienvenido Fabian – composer
- Fabolous – rapper (Dominican mother, African American father)
- Zacarías Ferreira – bachata singer
- Xiomara Fortuna – singer
- Omar Franco – singer/composer
- Billo Frómeta – singer
- Juan Francisco García – merengue composer
- Jhene Aiko – singer (Dominican, Spanish, Japanese mother)
- Vicente García – singer-songwriter
- Teodora Ginés – composer
- Lilly Goodman – singer
- Leslie Grace – singer-songwriter
- Juan Luis Guerra – merengue/bachata/salsa musician
- Luichy Guzman – film composer
- Ivonne Haza – soprano singer
- Tatico Henriquez – merengue musician
- Martha Heredia – singer
- Julio Alberto Hernández – composer
- Maridalia Hernández
- Vinylz Hernandez – music producer
- Eddy Herrera – merengue singer
- Nicky Jam – reggaeton artist (Dominican mother, Puerto Rican father)
- Porfi Jimenez – trumpeter, composer and conductor
- Alih Jey – singer
- Krisspy – merengue singer
- Bullumba Landestoy – pianist, composer
- Ñico Lora – known as the "Father of Merengue" music, singer
- Margarita Luna de Espaillat – composer
- Anthony Ríos – ballad singer
- Los Hermanos Rosario – merengue group
- Romeo Santos – bachata/reggaeton singer (Dominican father, Puerto Rican mother)
- Luny Tunes – reggaeton producers/artists
- Maffio – music producer
- Domenic Marte – bachata singer
- Melanie Martinez – pop singer (Dominican mother, Puerto Rican father)
- La Materialista – singer
- Henry Mendez – reggaeton artist
- José Antonio Molina – classical composer
- Munchi – DJ

=== N–Z ===
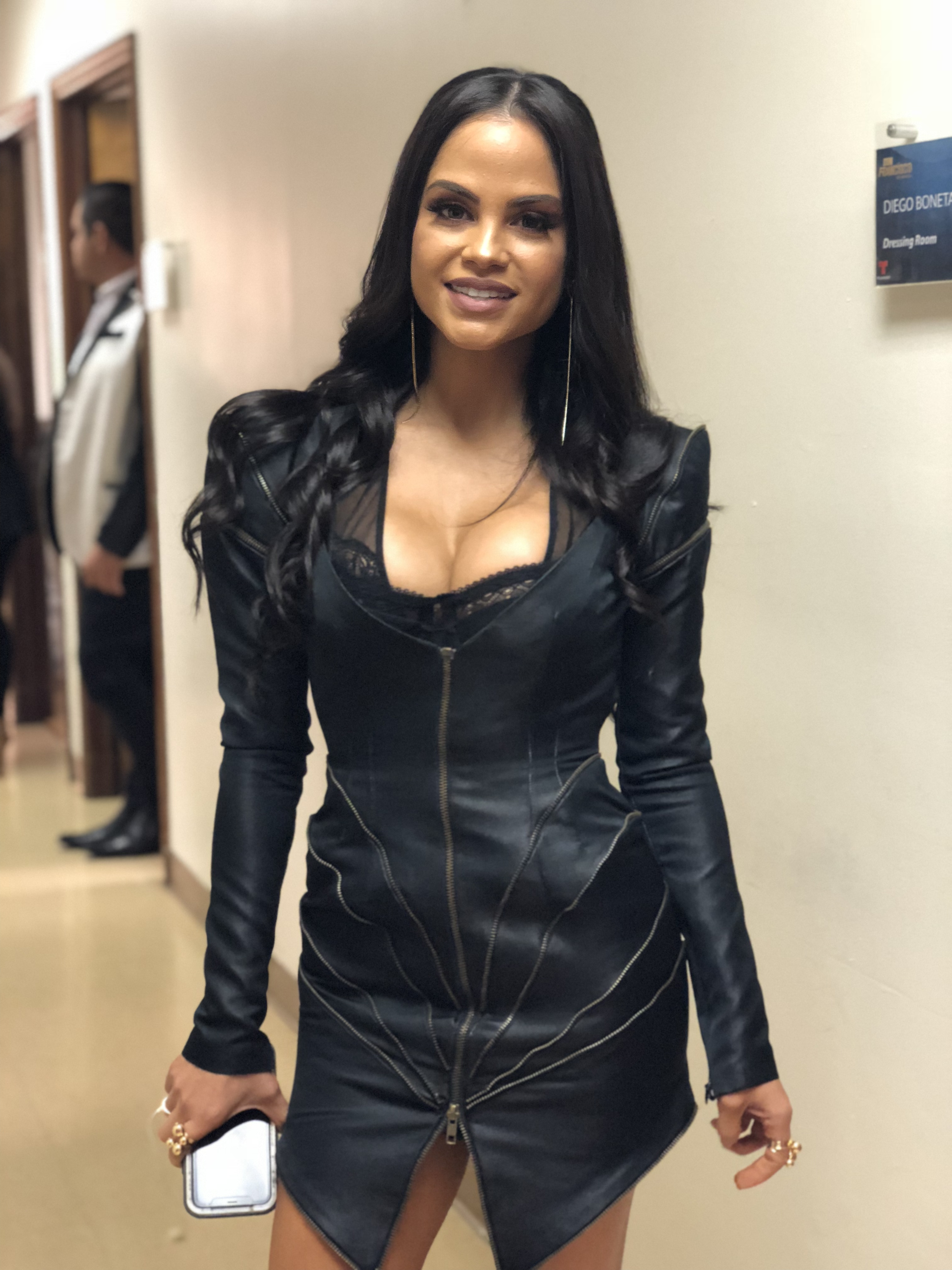
Natti Natasha

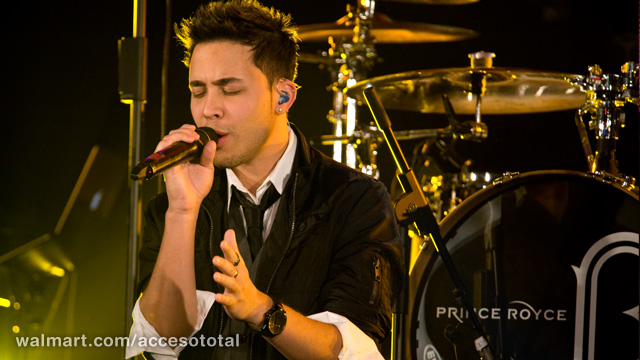
Prince Royce

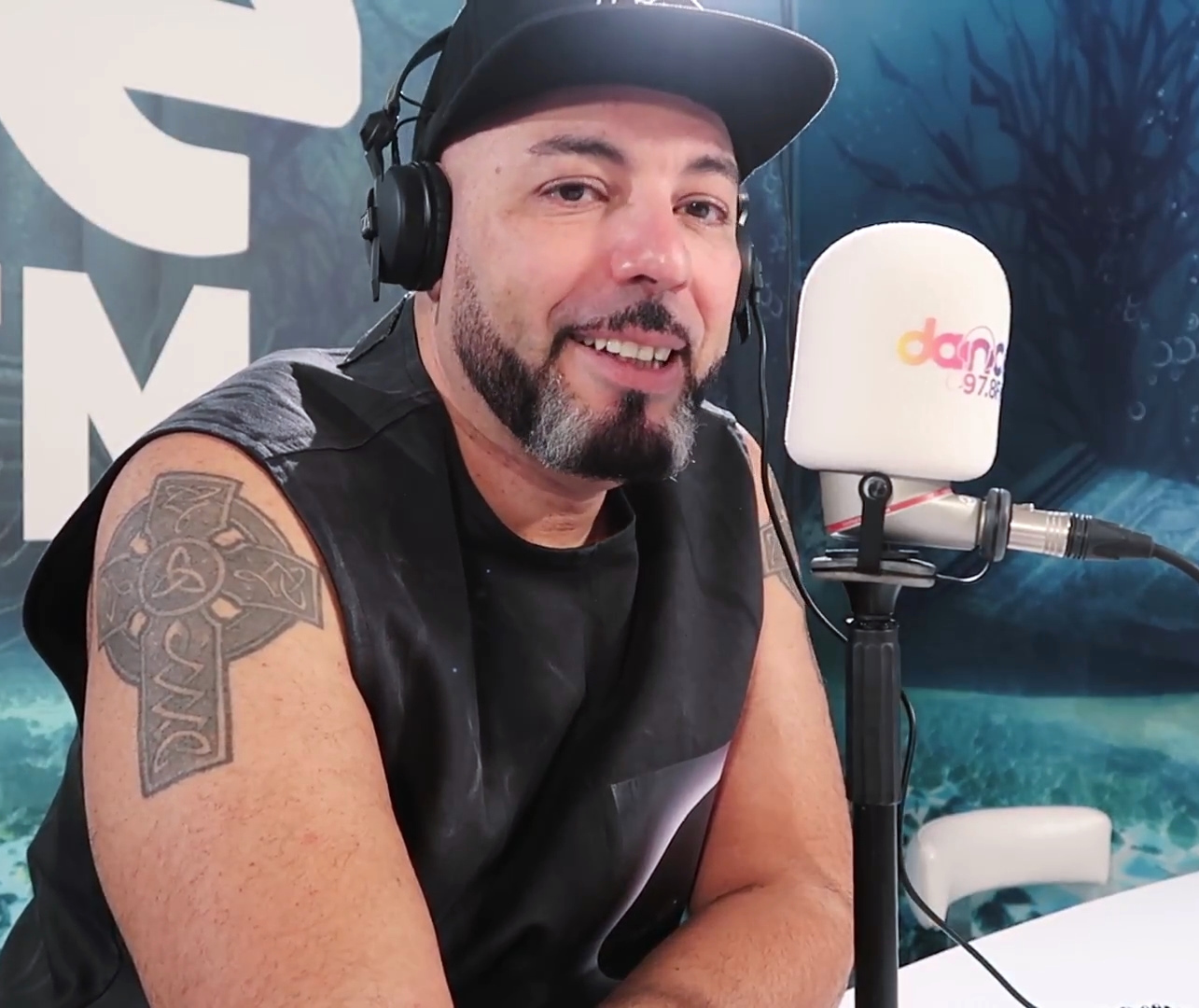
Grammy award-winning DJ, Roger Sanchez.

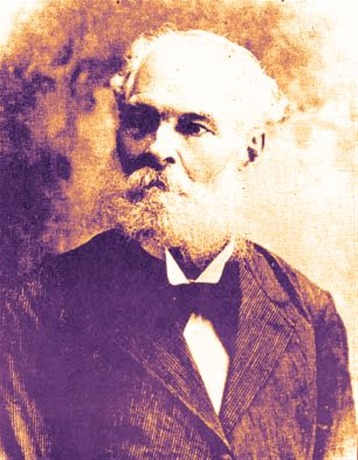
Jose Rufino Reyes

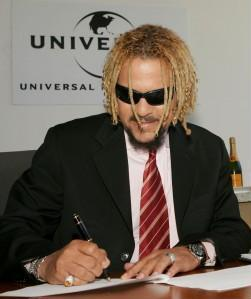
Toño Rosario

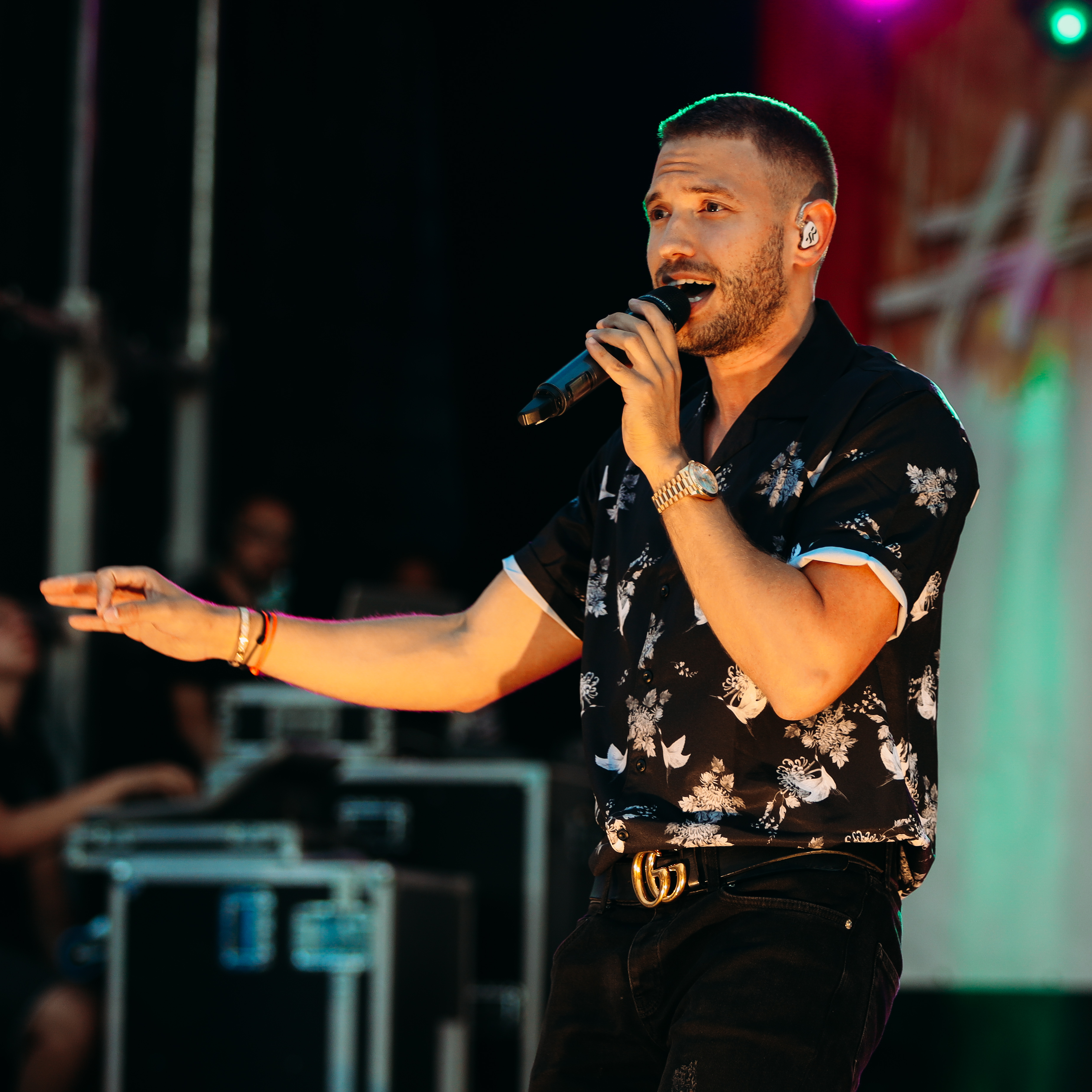
Rolf Sanchez

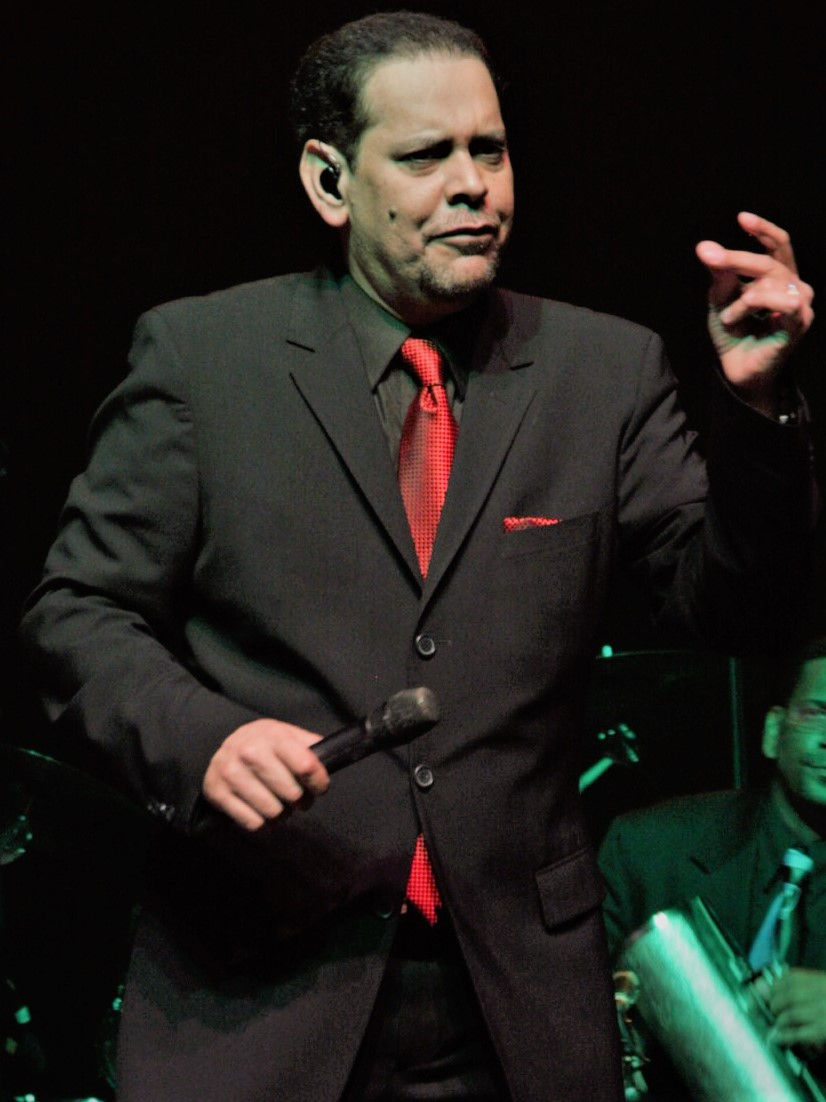
Dominican Merengue singer Fernando Villalona.

- Natti Natasha – singer
- Noztra – reggaeton artist
- Francisco Núñez – musical conductor
- Pavel Nuñez – pop/rock musician
- Omega – merenhouse musician
- Juan Francisco Ordóñez – guitarist/composer
- Ramón Orlando – merengue singer
- Shalim Ortiz – singer
- Johnny Pacheco – salsa singer/producer/bandleader
- Leonardo Paniagua – bachata artist
- Karina Pasian – singer/pianist
- Chichí Peralta – singer, bandleader, percussionist
- Rubby Perez – singer
- Carlos Piantini – conductor and musician
- Geovanny Polanco – merengue singer
- Prince Royce – bachata singer
- Milly Quezada – singer, dubbed the "Queen of Merengue"
- Fausto Rey – singer/composer
- Frank Reyes – bachata singer
- José Rufino Reyes y Siancas – composer of Dominican national anthem
- Trio Reynoso – known as the "kings of merengue tipico" merengue/bachata group
- Ariel Rivas – music producer
- Mario Rivera – jazz composer/artist
- Raulín Rodríguez – bachata singer
- Richard Camacho – pop singer (Dominican Parents)
- Rosangela Abreu Crespo – singer
- Toño Rosario – merengue singer
- Raulín Rosendo – salsa singer
- Roger Sanchez – DJ/house music producer
- Rolf Sanchez – pop musician (Dominican mother)
- Daniel Santacruz – singer-songwriter
- Lizette Santana (also known as Lizé) – singer-songwriter
- Santaye – singer-songwriter
- Antony Santos – bachata singer
- Yoskar Sarante – bachata singer
- Luis Segura – singer
- Triple Seis – rapper
- Twin Shadow – indie musician
- Vicky Shell – singer-songwriter
- Rafael Solano – songwriter/composer
- Giselle Tavera – singer
- Michael Tavera – composer
- Ines Thomas Almeida – opera singer
- Tokischa – rapper
- Cuco Valoy – merengue singer/bandleader
- Luis Vargas – bachata singer
- Sergio Vargas – merengue singer
- Wilfrido Vargas – merengue singer
- Johnny Ventura – merengue singer, vice mayor (1994–1998) and mayor of Santo Domingo (1998–2002)
- Fernando Villalona – singer
- J.R. Writer – rapper
- Xaviersobased - rapper
- Marcos Yaroide – Christian singer, composer

== Sports figures ==
=== Baseball ===
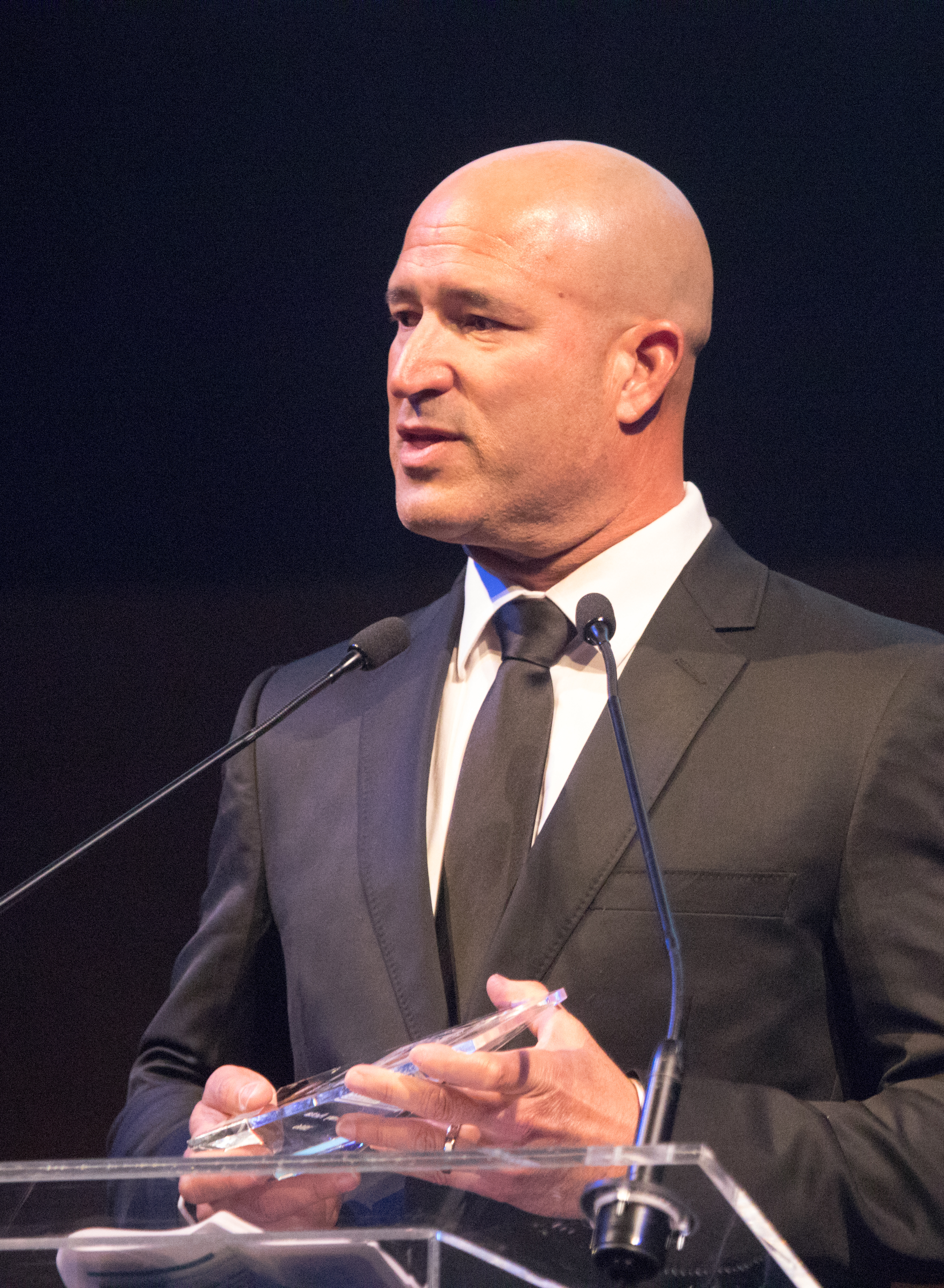
Manny Acta

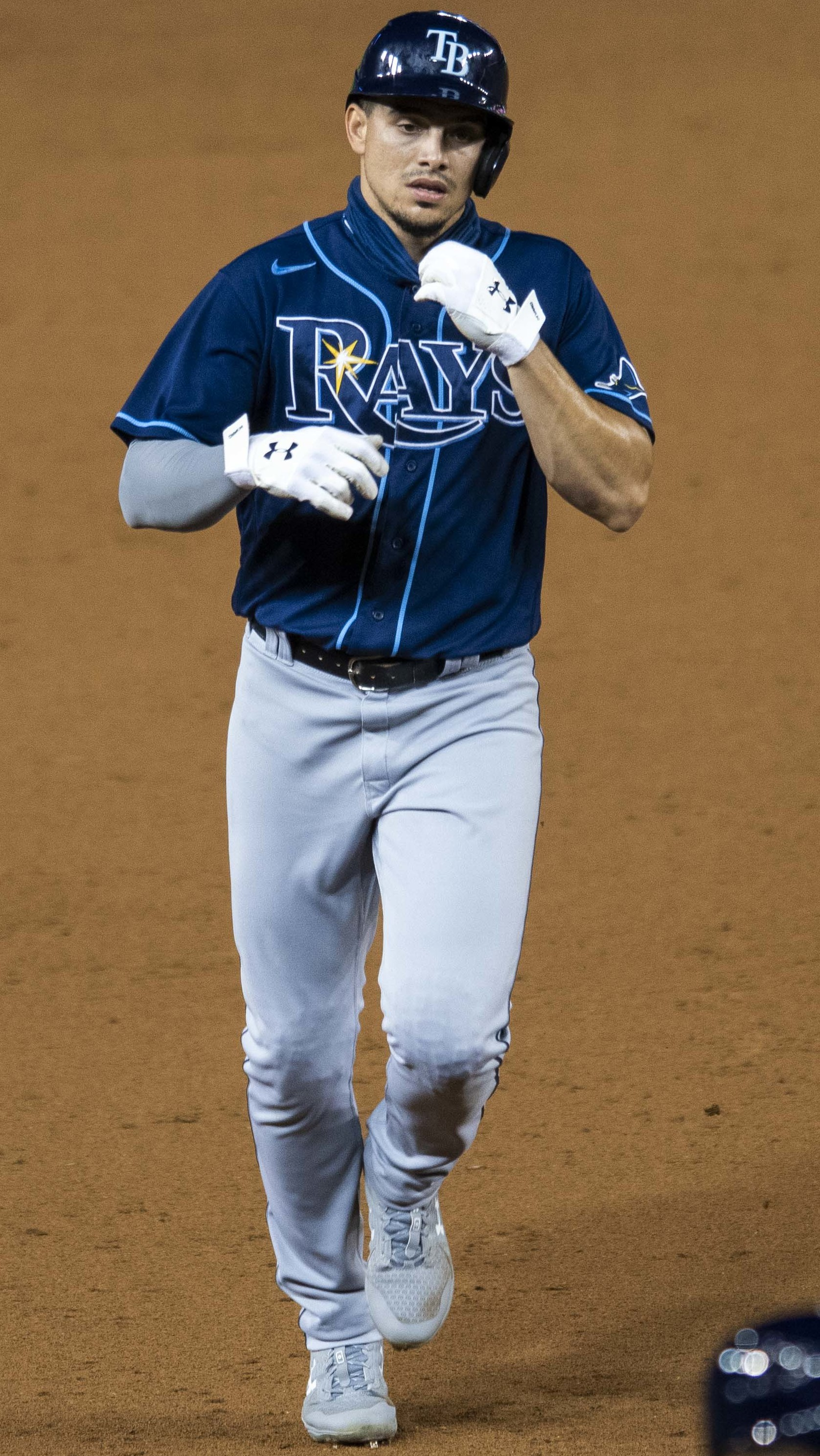
Willy Adames

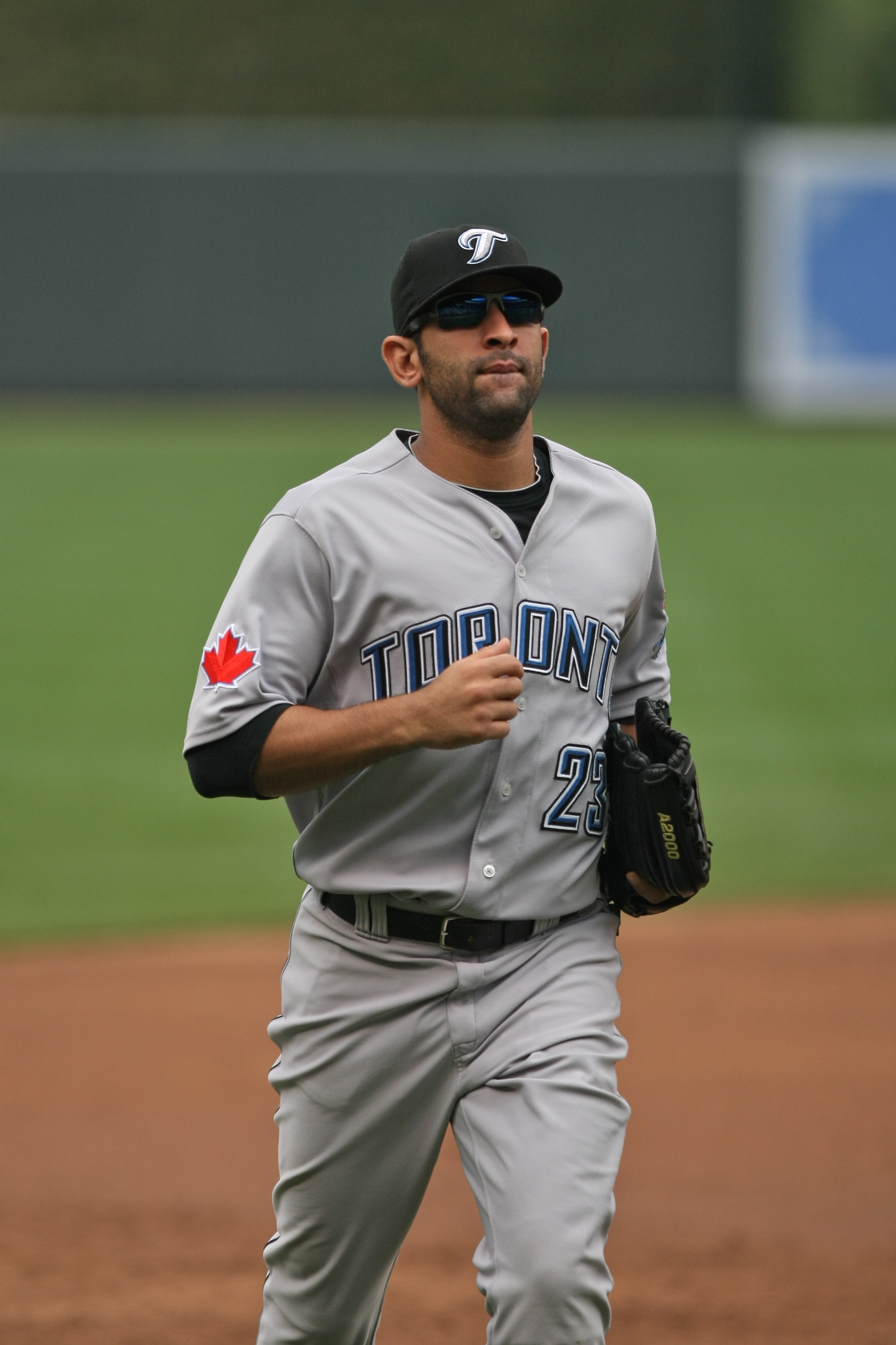
José Bautista

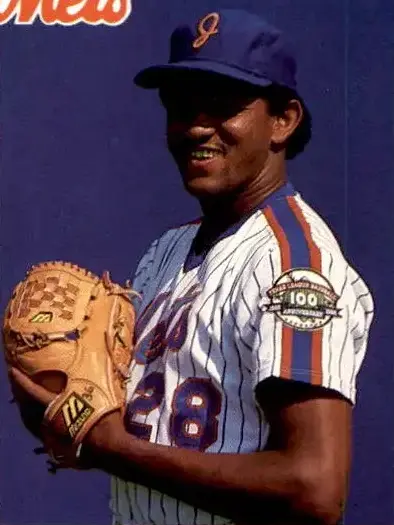
José Bautista (pitcher)]

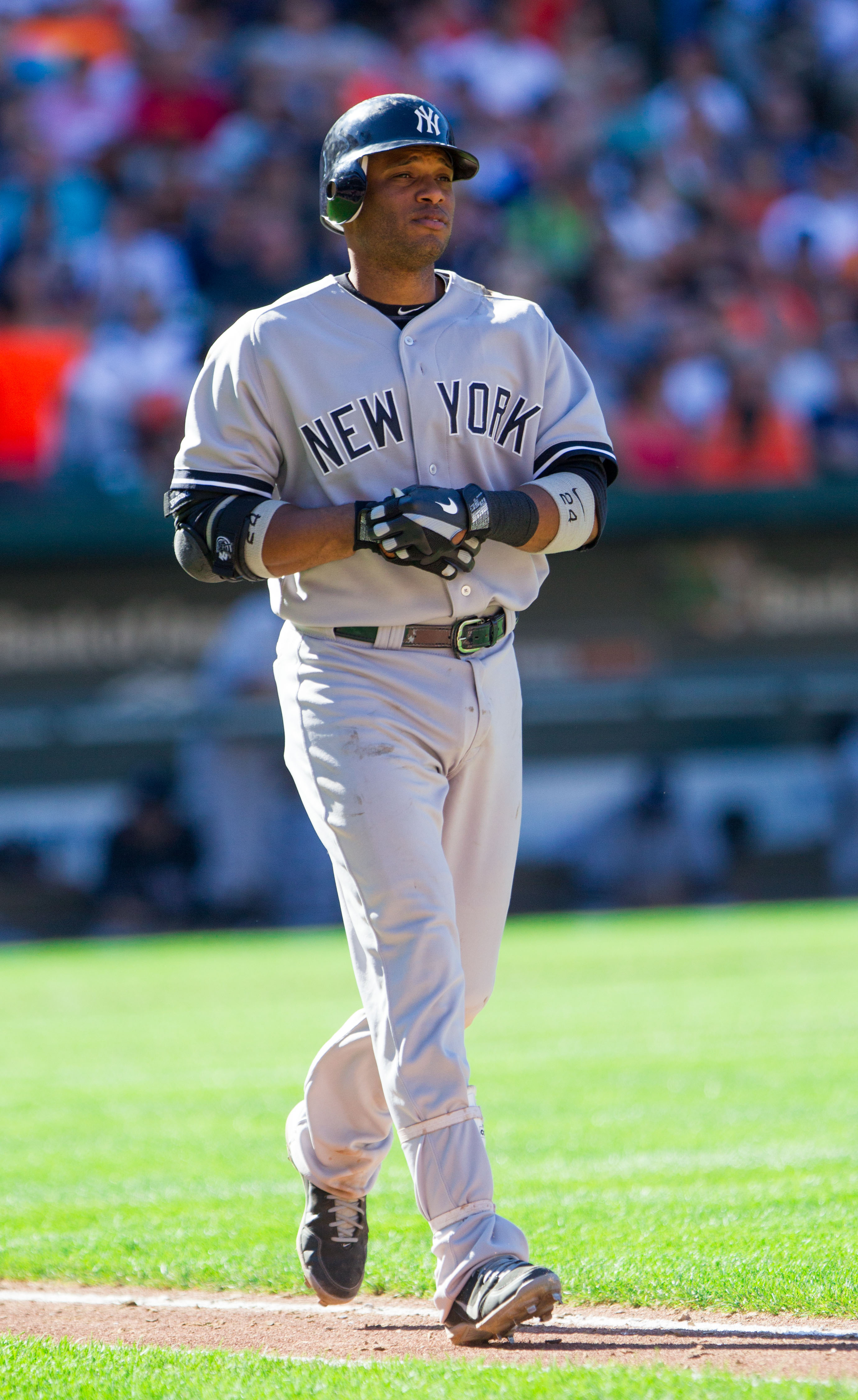
Robinson Canó

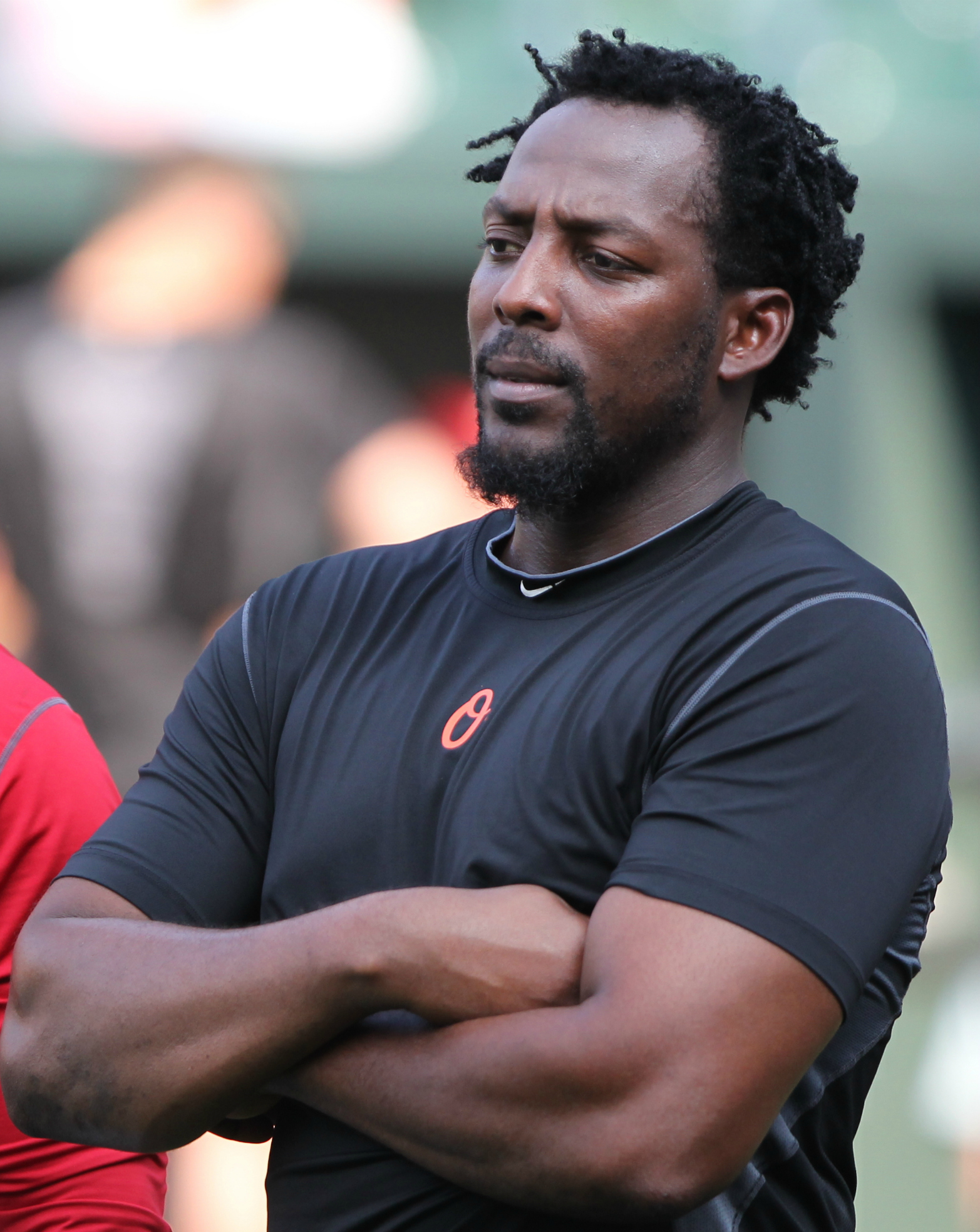
Vladimir Guerrero

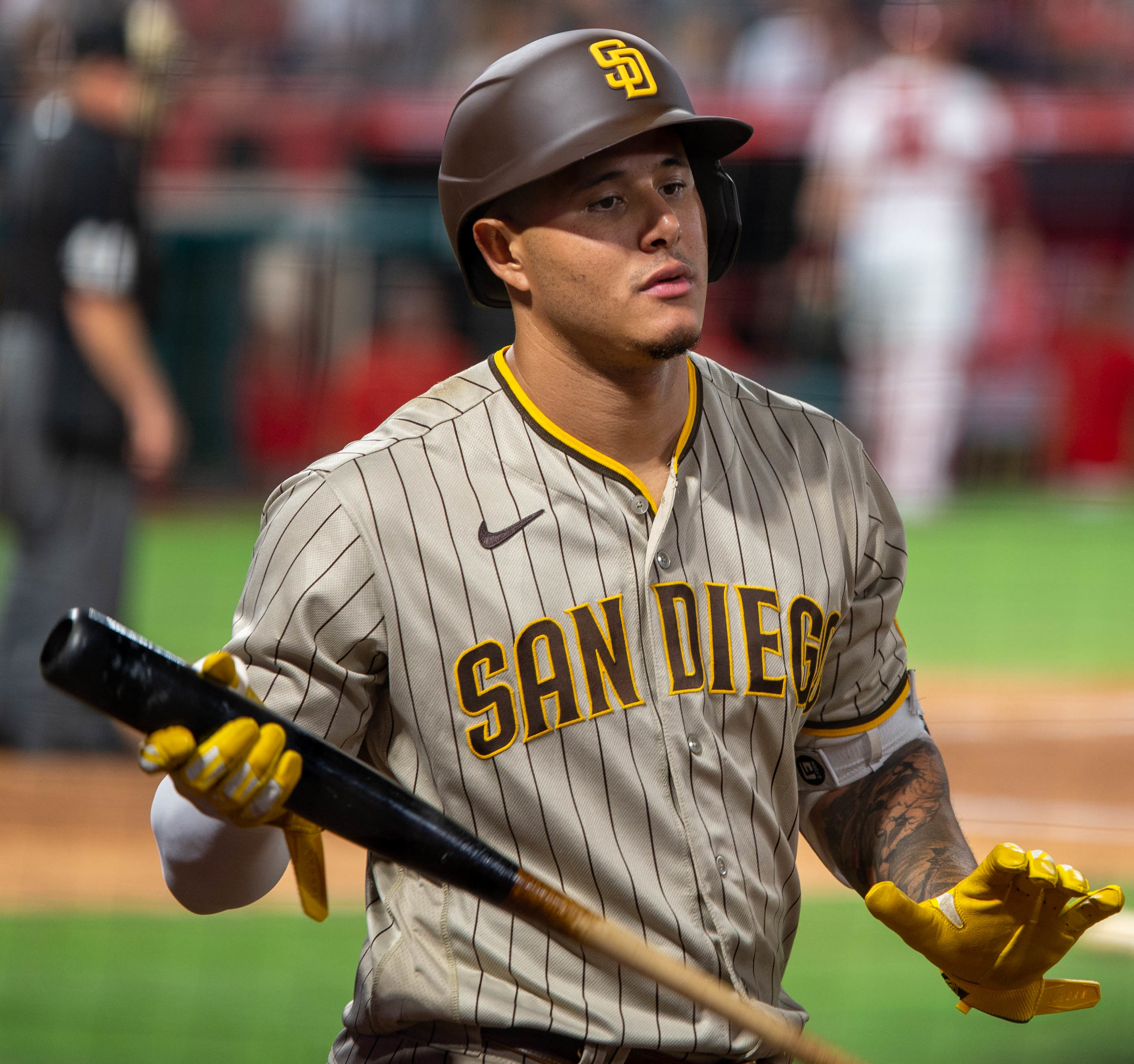
Manny Machado

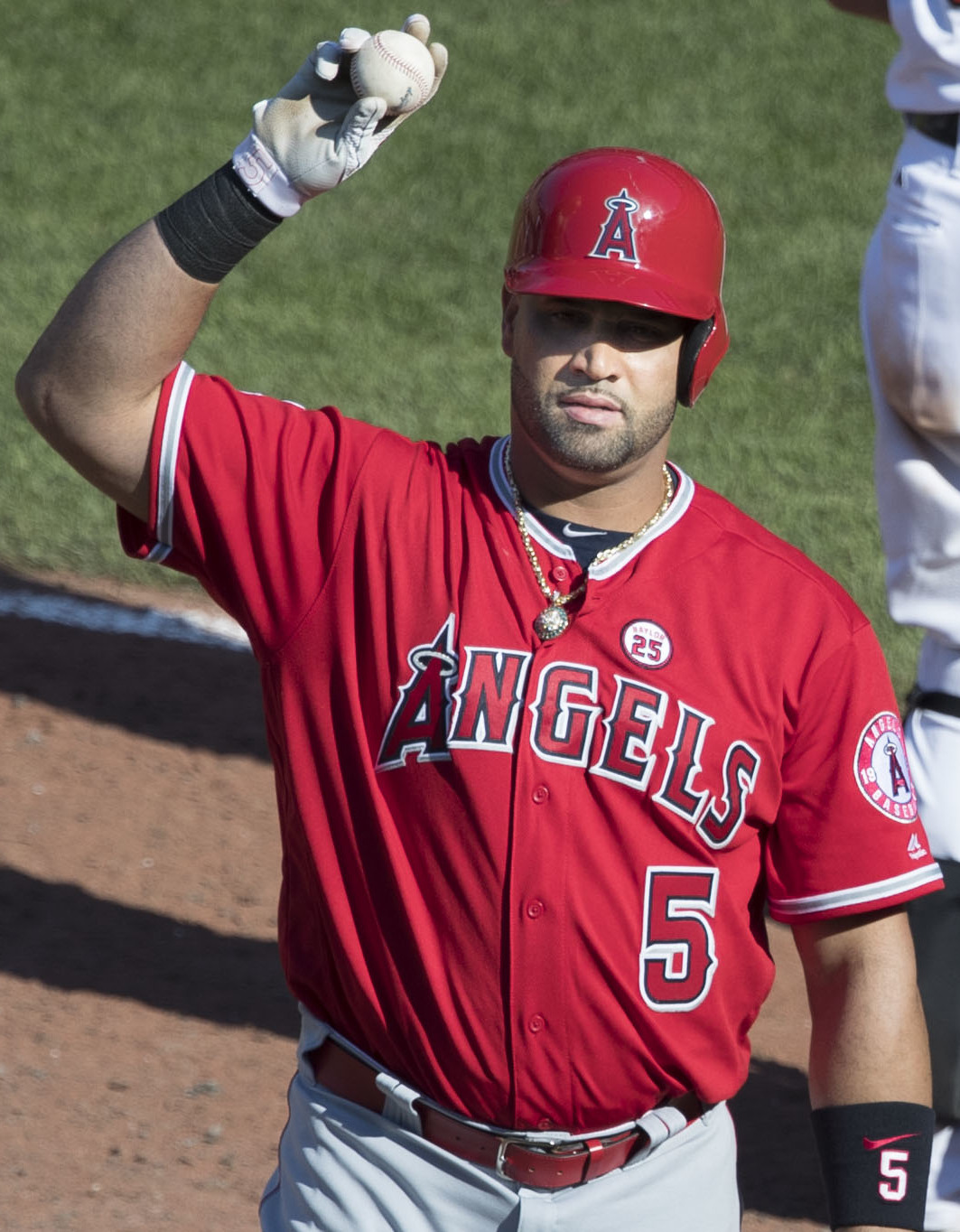
Alberto Pujols

- Manny Acta – former manager of the Cleveland Indians
- Willy Adames – professional baseball player
- Antonio Alfonseca – professional baseball player
- Carlos Almanzar – professional baseball player
- Felipe Alou – professional baseball manager and player
- Jesús Alou – professional baseball player
- Matty Alou – professional baseball player
- Moisés Alou – professional baseball player
- Joaquín Andújar – professional baseball player
- Greg Aquino – professional baseball player
- Joaquin Arias – professional baseball player
- Miguel Batista – professional baseball player
- Tony Batista – professional baseball player
- Danny Bautista – professional baseball player
- Denny Bautista – professional baseball player
- José Bautista – professional baseball player
- José Bautista (pitcher) – professional baseball pitcher and pitching coach
- George Bell – professional baseball player
- Ronnie Belliard – professional baseball player
- Francis Beltrán – professional baseball player
- Adrián Beltré – professional baseball player
- Esteban Beltré – professional baseball player
- Armando Benítez – professional baseball player
- Joaquín Benoit – professional baseball player
- Ángel Berroa – professional baseball player
- Wilson Betemit – professional baseball player
- Tony Blanco – professional baseball player
- Pedro Borbón, Jr. – professional baseball player
- Yhency Brazobán – professional baseball player
- Juan Brito (catcher) – professional baseball catcher
- Juan Brito (infielder) – professional baseball infielder
- Daniel Cabrera – professional baseball player
- Francisco Cabrera – professional baseball player
- Melky Cabrera – professional baseball player
- Robinson Canó – professional baseball player
- Rico Carty – professional baseball player
- Bernie Castro – professional baseball player
- Fabio Castro – professional baseball player
- Starlin Castro – professional baseball player
- Alberto Castillo – professional baseball player
- Luis Castillo – professional baseball player
- César Cedeño – professional baseball player
- Jesús Colomé – professional baseball player
- Bartolo Colón – professional baseball player
- Román Colón – professional baseball player
- Francisco Cordero – professional baseball player
- Deivi Cruz – professional baseball player
- Johnny Cueto – professional baseball player
- Elly De La Cruz (born 2002) - professional baseball player
- Seranthony Domínguez – professional baseball pitcher
- Octavio Dotel – professional baseball player
- Edwin Encarnación – professional baseball player
- Juan Encarnación – professional baseball player
- Pedro Feliz – professional baseball player
- Bartolomé Fortunato – professional baseball player
- Rafael Furcal – professional baseball player
- Julio Franco – professional baseball player
- Jerry Gil – professional baseball player
- Carlos Gómez – professional baseball player
- Deivy Grullón – professional baseball player
- Vladimir Guerrero – professional baseball player
- Vladimir Guerrero Jr. – professional baseball player
- José Guillén – professional baseball player
- Cristian Guzmán – professional baseball player
- Freddy Guzmán – professional baseball player
- Ronald Guzman – professional baseball player
- Félix Heredia – professional baseball player
- Roberto Hernández (formerly known as Fausto Carmona) – professional baseball player
- Runelvys Hernández – professional baseball player
- Julián Javier – professional baseball player
- Stan Javier – professional baseball player
- José Lima – professional baseball player
- Francisco Liriano – professional baseball player
- Pedro Liriano – professional baseball player
- Mendy López – professional baseball player
- Julio Lugo – professional baseball player
- Ruddy Lugo – professional baseball player
- Héctor Luna – professional baseball player
- Manny Machado – professional baseball player
- Henry Mateo – professional baseball player
- Julio Mateo – professional baseball player
- Juan Marichal – professional baseball player
- Dámaso Marte – professional baseball player
- Starling Marte – professional baseball player (New York Mets)
- Pedro Martínez – Cy Young Award-winning professional baseball player
- Yermín Mercedes – catcher/designated hitter for the San Francisco Giants
- José Mesa – professional baseball player
- Omar Minaya – General Manager of the New York Mets
- Raúl Mondesí – professional baseball player
- Agustín Montero – professional baseball player
- Juan Morillo – professional baseball player
- Abraham Núñez – professional baseball player
- Leo Núñez – professional baseball player
- José Offerman – professional baseball player
- Miguel Olivo – professional baseball player
- David Ortiz – professional baseball player
- Ramón Ortiz – professional baseball player
- Pablo Ozuna – professional baseball player
- Ronny Paulino – professional baseball player
- Carlos Peña – professional baseball player
- Tony Peña – professional baseball player
- Wily Mo Peña – professional baseball player
- Jhonny Peralta – professional baseball player
- Antonio Pérez – professional baseball player
- Mélido Pérez – professional baseball player
- Neifi Pérez – professional baseball player
- Odalis Pérez – professional baseball player
- Rafael Pérez – professional baseball player
- Timo Pérez – professional baseball player
- Hipólito Pichardo – professional baseball player
- Plácido Polanco – professional baseball player
- Albert Pujols – first baseman and designated hitter for the St. Louis Cardinals and Los Angeles Angels
- Aramis Ramírez – professional baseball player
- Hanley Ramírez – professional baseball player
- Manny Ramírez – professional baseball player
- José Reyes – professional baseball player
- Fernando Rodney – professional baseball player
- Alex Rodriguez – professional baseball player
- Félix Rodríguez – professional baseball player
- Henry Rodríguez – professional baseball player
- Julio Rodríguez (born 2000) La Insuperable professional baseball outfielder
- Wandy Rodríguez – professional baseball player
- Duaner Sánchez – professional baseball player
- Carlos Santana − first baseman and catcher for the Cleveland Indians and Philadelphia Phillies
- Víctor Santos – professional baseball player
- Jean Segura – professional baseball player
- Alfonso Soriano – professional baseball player
- Jorge Sosa – professional baseball player
- Sammy Sosa – professional baseball player
- Juan Soto – professional baseball player for the New York Mets
- Fernando Tatís Jr. – professional baseball player for the San Diego Padres
- Julián Tavárez – professional baseball player
- Oscar Taveras – professional baseball player
- Willy Taveras – professional baseball player
- Miguel Tejada – professional baseball player
- Rubén Tejada – professional baseball player
- Robinson Tejeda – professional baseball player
- Luis Terrero – professional baseball player
- Salomón Torres – professional baseball player
- Juan Uribe – professional baseball player
- Wilson Valdez – professional baseball player
- José Valverde – professional baseball player
- Claudio Vargas – professional baseball player
- Tetelo Vargas – professional baseball player
- Yordano Ventura – professional baseball player
- Ozzie Virgil – professional baseball player
- Luis Vizcaíno – professional baseball player
- Edinson Vólquez – professional baseball player
- Héctor Wagner – professional baseball player

=== Basketball ===
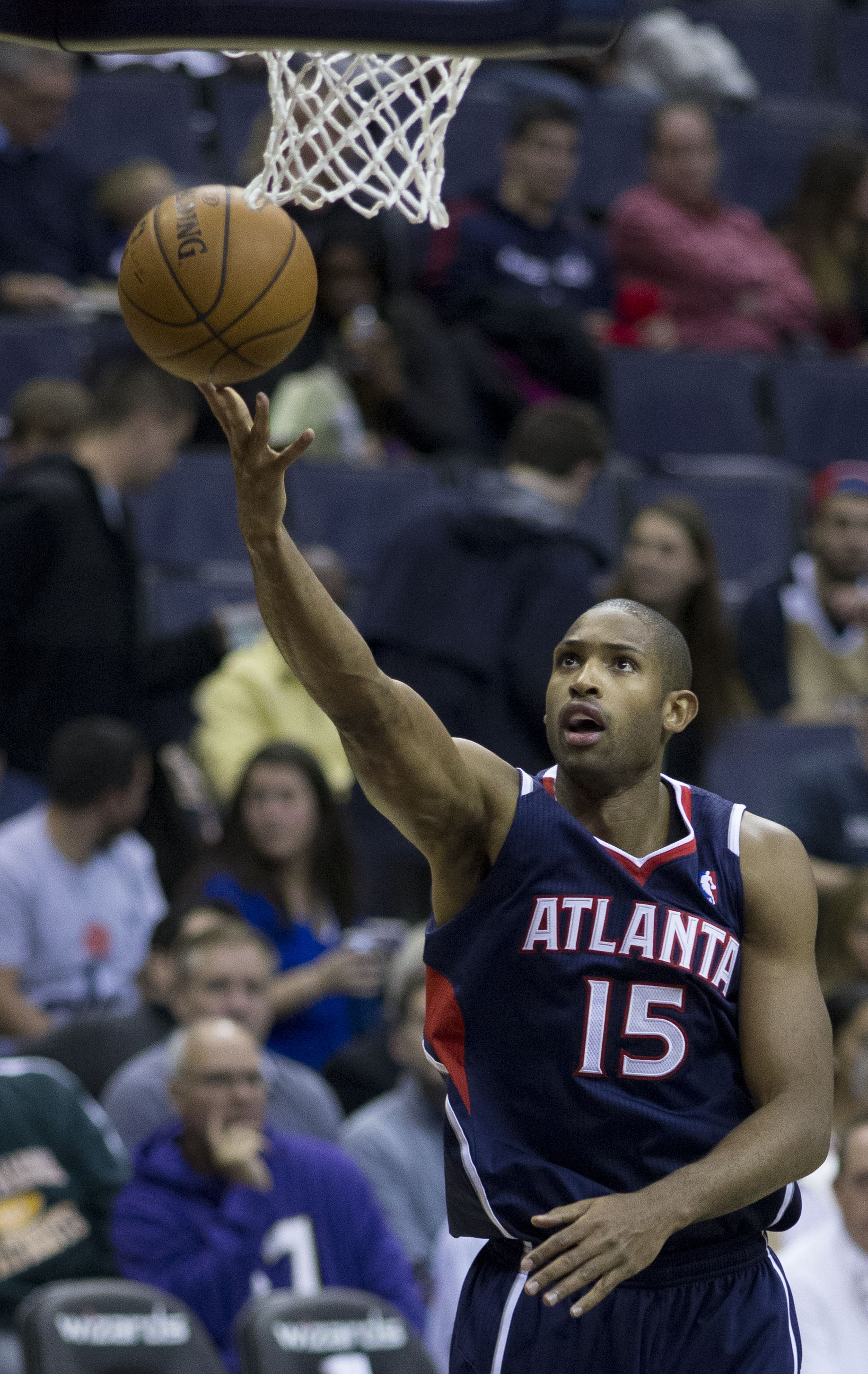
Al Horford

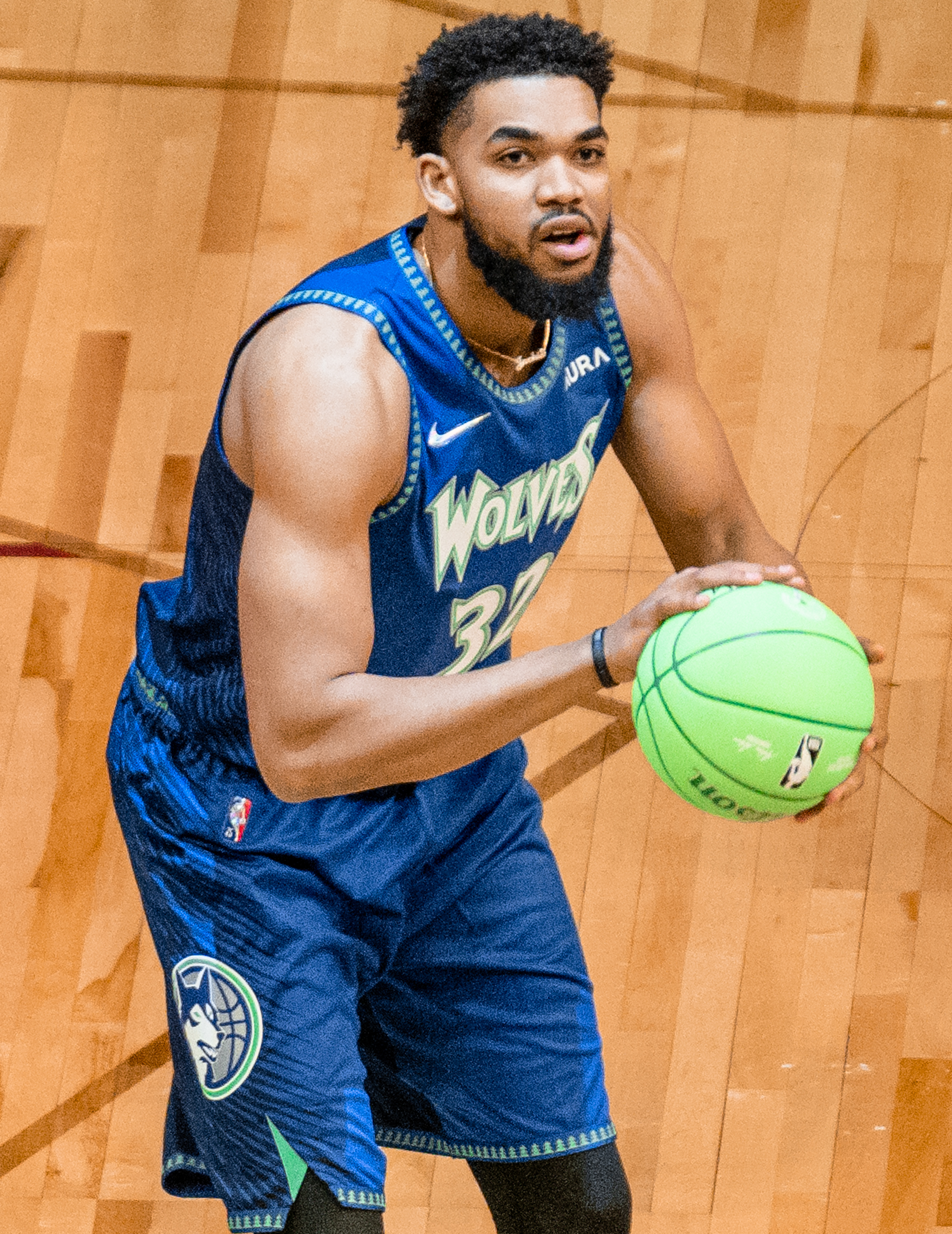
Karl-Anthony Towns

- Orlando Antigua – professional basketball player
- Trevor Ariza – professional basketball player
- Amaury Filion – professional basketball player
- Luis Flores – basketball player, 2009 top scorer in the Israel Basketball Premier League
- Francisco García – professional basketball player
- Al Horford – professional basketball player
- Tito Horford – professional basketball player
- Felipe López – professional basketball player
- Jack Michael Martínez – professional basketball player
- Sammy Mejia – professional basketball player
- Rigoberto Mendoza (born 1992) – basketball player for Maccabi Haifa of the Israeli Basketball Premier League
- Luis Montero – basketball player
- Carlos Morban – basketball player
- Jaime Peterson – basketball player
- Miguel Angel Pichardo – basketball player
- Orlando Sánchez – professional basketball player
- Ron Sanchez – professional basketball player
- Edgar Sosa – professional basketball player
- Gerardo Suero – professional basketball player
- Karl-Anthony Towns – professional basketball player
- Eloy Vargas – professional basketball player
- José Vargas – professional basketball player
- Charlie Villanueva – professional basketball player
- Franklin Western – professional basketball player

=== Boxing ===
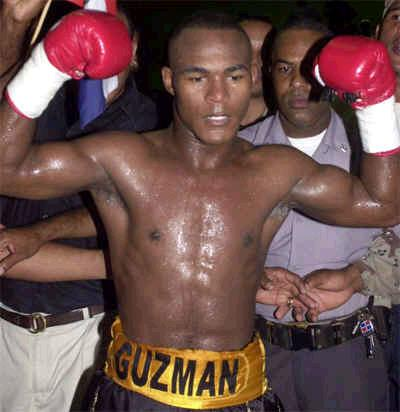
Joan Guzmán

- Danilo Cabrera – professional boxer
- Francisco Contreras – boxer
- Carlos Cruz – former professional boxing champion
- Leo Cruz – professional boxing champion
- Johnny De La Rosa – professional boxer
- Manuel Félix Díaz – professional boxer
- Vilomar Fernandez – professional boxer
- Javier Fortuna – professional boxer
- Julio Gervacio – professional boxer
- Fernando Guerrero – professional boxer
- Joan Guzmán – professional boxer
- Luis Ernesto José – professional boxer
- Eleoncio Mercedes – professional boxer
- Juan Carlos Payano – boxer
- Delvin Rodriguez – professional boxer
- Edwin Rodriguez – professional boxer
- Glen Tapia – professional boxer

=== Other sports ===
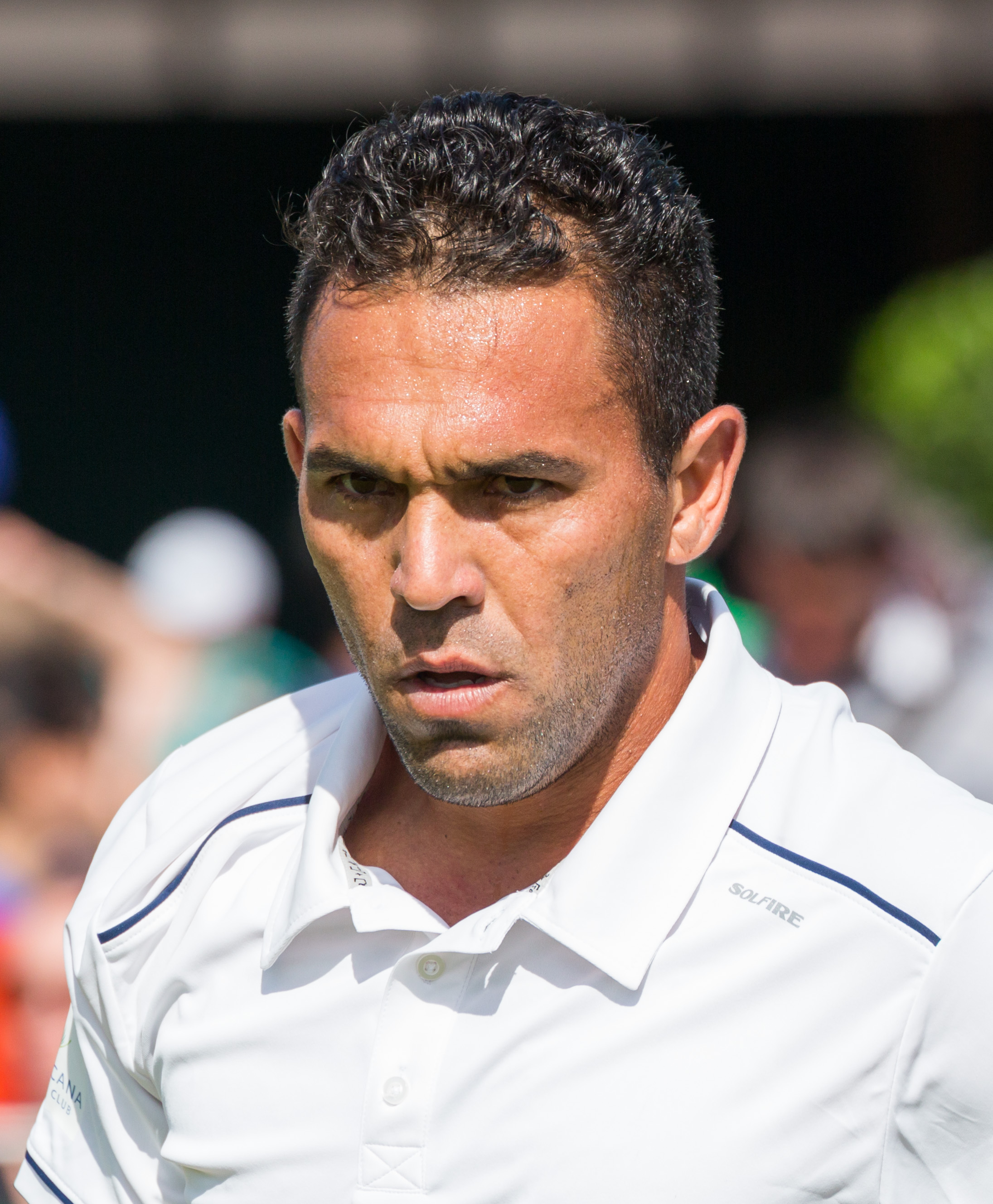
Víctor Estrella Burgos

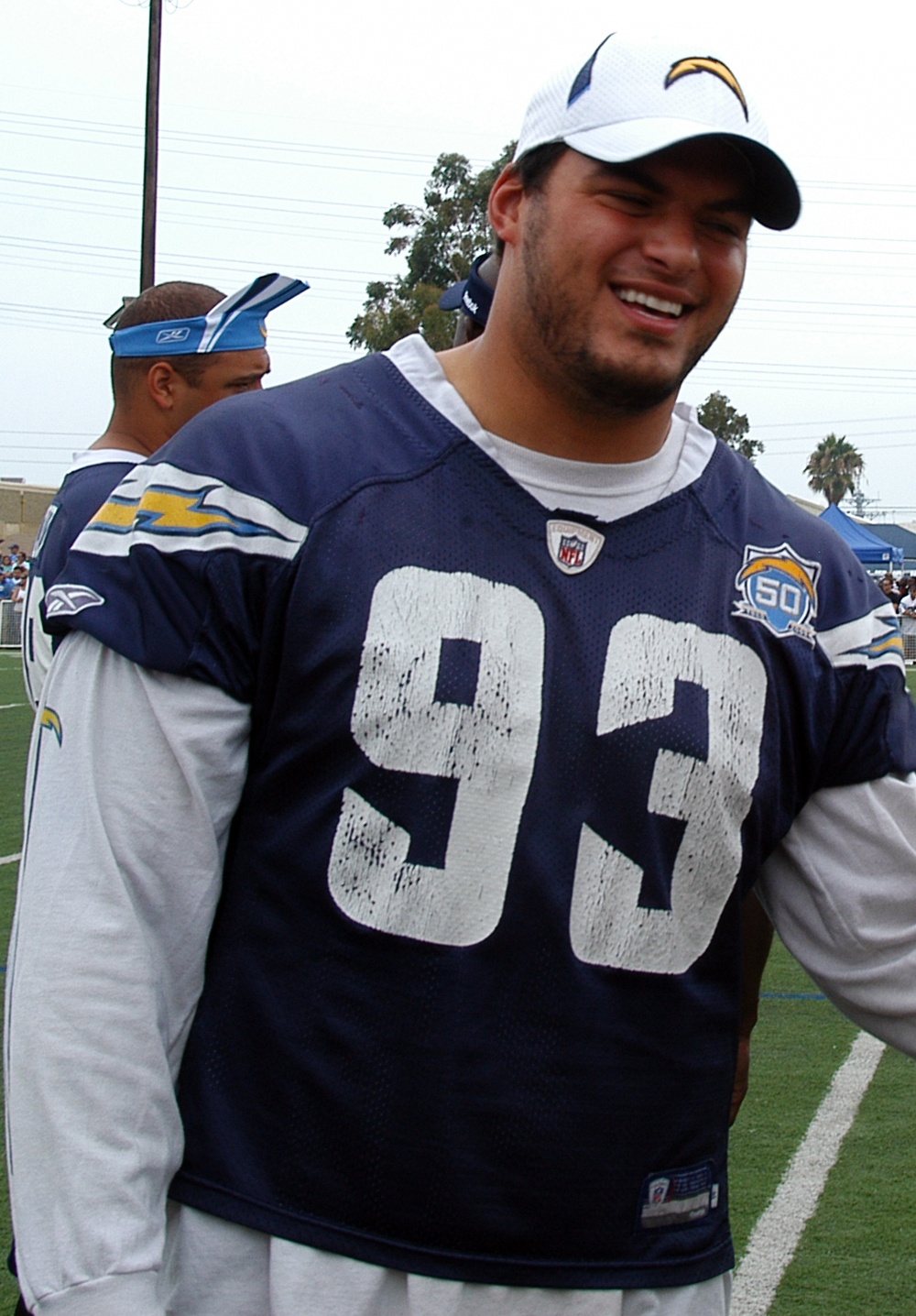
Luis Castillo

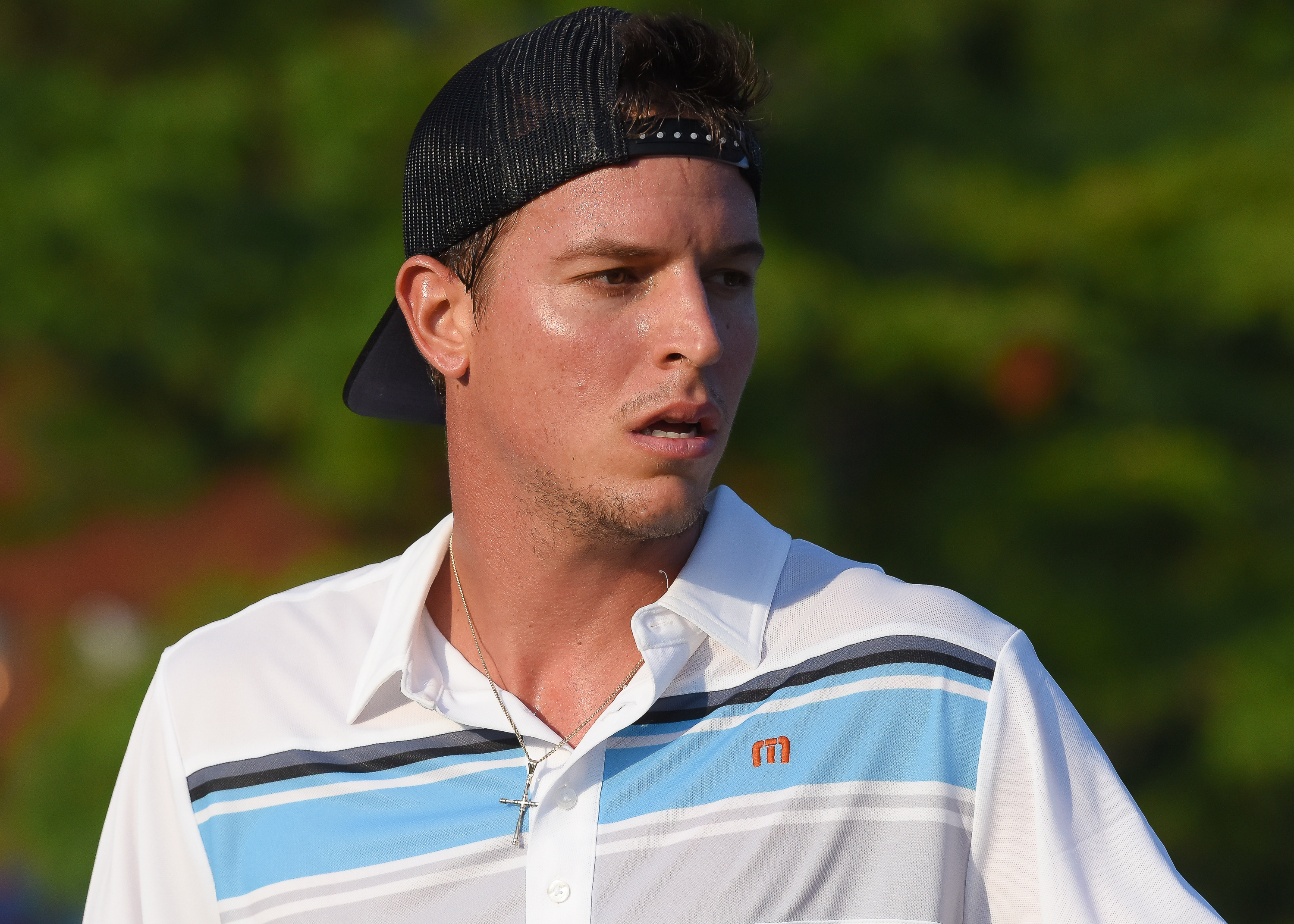
Jose Hernandez-Fernandez

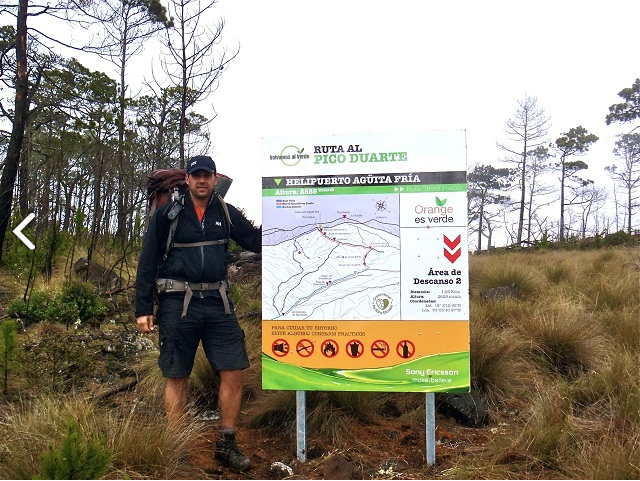
Iván Ernesto Gómez

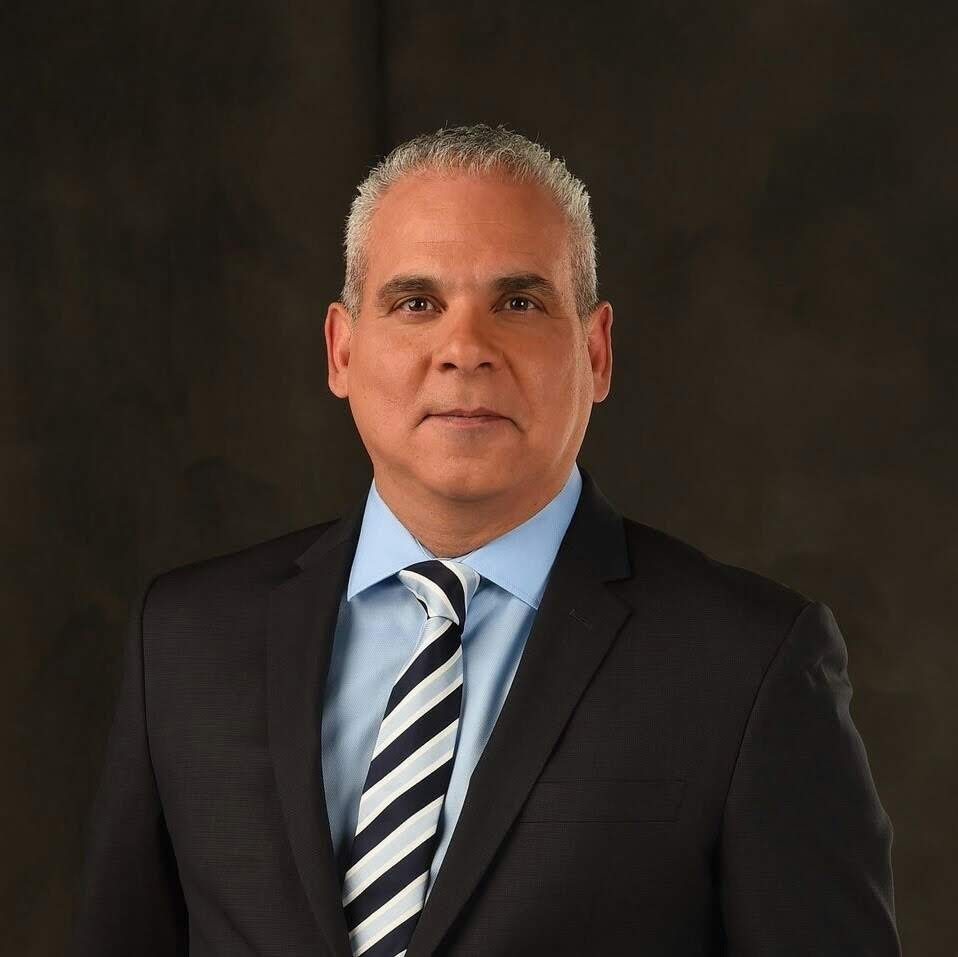
Ernesto Jerez

- Raul Aguayo – national sail team member
- Juana Arrendel – high jumper
- Milagros Cabral – professional volleyball player
- José Miguel Cáceres – professional volleyball player
- Adonis Carrasco – FIFA soccer referee
- Brenda Castillo – professional volleyball player
- Luis Castillo – professional football player
- Fany Chalas – sprinter
- Stalin Colinet – former professional football player
- Yuderqui Contreras – weightlifter
- Domingo Cordero – hurdler
- Bethania de la Cruz – professional volleyball player
- Wendy Cruz – cyclist
- Marcos Díaz – ultra-distance swimmer
- Karla Echenique – professional volleyball player
- Edward Vinicio Espinal – professional soccer player
- Mariano Díaz Mejía – professional soccer player
- Jaime Espinal – Olympic wrestler
- Víctor Estrella Burgos – tennis player
- Lisvel Elisa Eve – professional volleyball player
- Mary Joe Fernández – professional tennis player
- Alex Garcia – UFC fighter
- Iván Ernesto Gómez – elite mountaineer
- Aumi Guerra – professional bowler
- Dionicio Gustavo – karateka
- Robinson Hilario – kitesurfer
- José Hernández – tennis player
- Francia Jackson – professional volleyball player
- Jhohanny Jean – taekwondo athlete
- Ernesto Jerez – sportscaster
- Julio Luciano – high jumper
- Víctor Martínez – professional bodybuilder
- Gabriel Mercedes – taekwondo practitioner
- Juan Núñez – sprinter
- Sidarka Núñez – professional volleyball player
- Victor Nunez – soccer player
- Michael-Ray Pallares-González – tennis player
- Pablo Ramírez – professional skateboarder
- Alexis Panisse – runner
- Domingo Peralta – soccer player
- Wanda Rijo – weightlifter
- Heidy Rodríguez – karateka
- Jeoselyna Rodríguez Santos – professional volleyball player
- Cindy Rondón – professional volleyball player
- Dante Rosario – professional football player
- Félix Sánchez – Olympic gold medal–winning hurdler
- Raysa Sanchez – sprinter
- Luguelín Santos – Olympic silver medalist-sprinter
- Annerys Vargas – professional volleyball player
- Jack Veneno – professional wrestler
- Ana Villanueva – karateka

== Other personalities ==
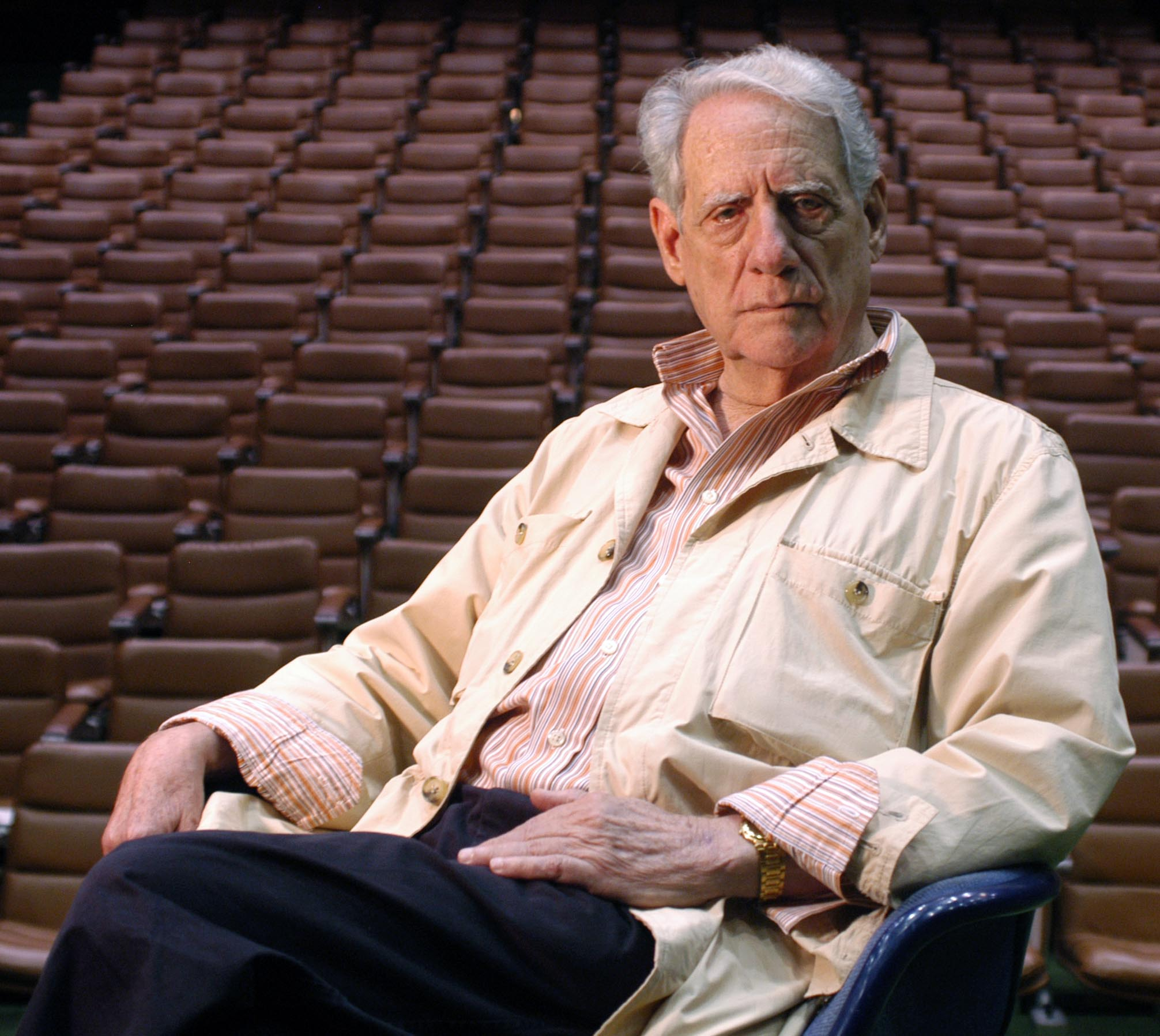
Rafael Calventi, diplomat and architect.

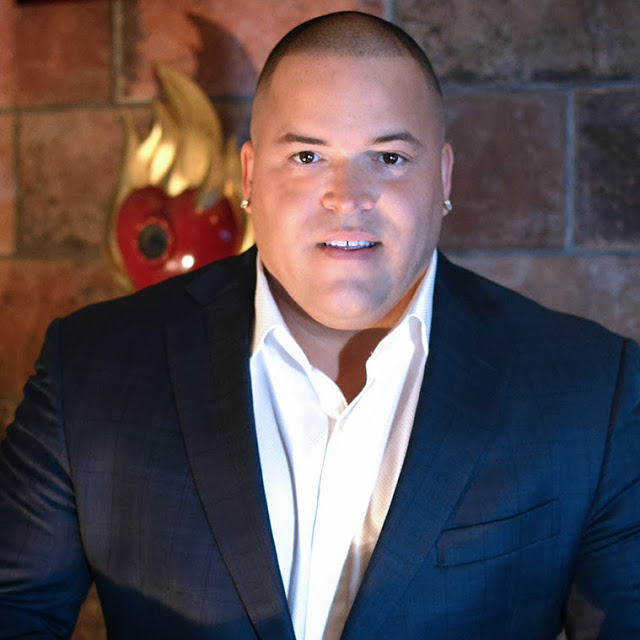
Johnny Marines – music executive

- Rolando Acosta – associate justice
- Félix Acosta-Núñez – journalist
- Danny Almonte – notable Little League player
- Radhames Aracena – music producer
- Rafael Bello – journalist
- Billy Berroa – sports broadcaster
- Pedro Borrell – architect
- José María Cabral – director
- Vladimir Caamaño – comedian
- Rafael Calventi – architect, diplomat
- Silvia Carreño-Coll – district judge
- Claudia Castaños – journalist
- Cirilo J Guzmán – lawyer
- Marino Vinicio Castillo – lawyer
- Miguel Cocco – politician
- Shirley Collado – psychology professor, president of Ithaca college
- Federico Alberto Cuello Camilo – diplomat
- Alexandra Cheron – socialite/model
- Jose DeCamps – dancer
- Dayanny De La Cruz – chef
- Nelson de la Rosa – actor, comedian
- Mario Alvarez Dugan – journalist
- Rudy Duthil – advertising executive
- Jose Gutierez – dancer, choreographer
- José María Heredia y Heredia – poet (Dominican parents)
- Emilio Prud’Homme – writer and lawyer
- Carmen Imbert Brugal – jurist, author
- Nereyda Rodríguez – folklorist and dancer
- María Isabel Soldevila – journalist
- Michele Jimenez – ballet dancer
- Mercedes Laura Aguiar – educator
- Paul Luna – restaurateur
- Johnny Marines – music executive
- Rámon Marrero Aristy – journalist
- Maria Marte – prominent chef working in Spain
- Jose E. Martinez – lawyer
- Ralph Mercado – founder of RMM Records; music producer
- Charles E Milander – social media expert
- Rafael Molina Morillo – journalist
- Francisco Moncion – ballet dancer, choreographer
- Miguel Núñez – theologian
- Providencia Paredes – assistant and confidante to Jacqueline Kennedy Onassis
- Quirino Paulino – notorious drug smuggler
- Arturo Pellerano Alfau – journalist
- Ilka Tanya Payán – actress, AIDS/HIV activist
- Pedro Saúl Pérez – activist
- Oscar Peter – champion figure skater
- Domingo Pilarte – evangelist
- Santiago Luis Polanco Rodríguez – drug dealer
- Carlos Rubio – political analyst
- Porfirio Rubirosa – diplomat, polo player, race car driver
- Socorro Sánchez del Rosario – educator, journalist
- José Santana (economist) – economist
- Manuel Tarrazo – fashion designer
- Miguel Vila Luna – architect and painter

== See also ==
- People of the Dominican Republic
- Dominican American
- List of Dominican Americans
- Culture of the Dominican Republic
