= Dominican Republic literature =

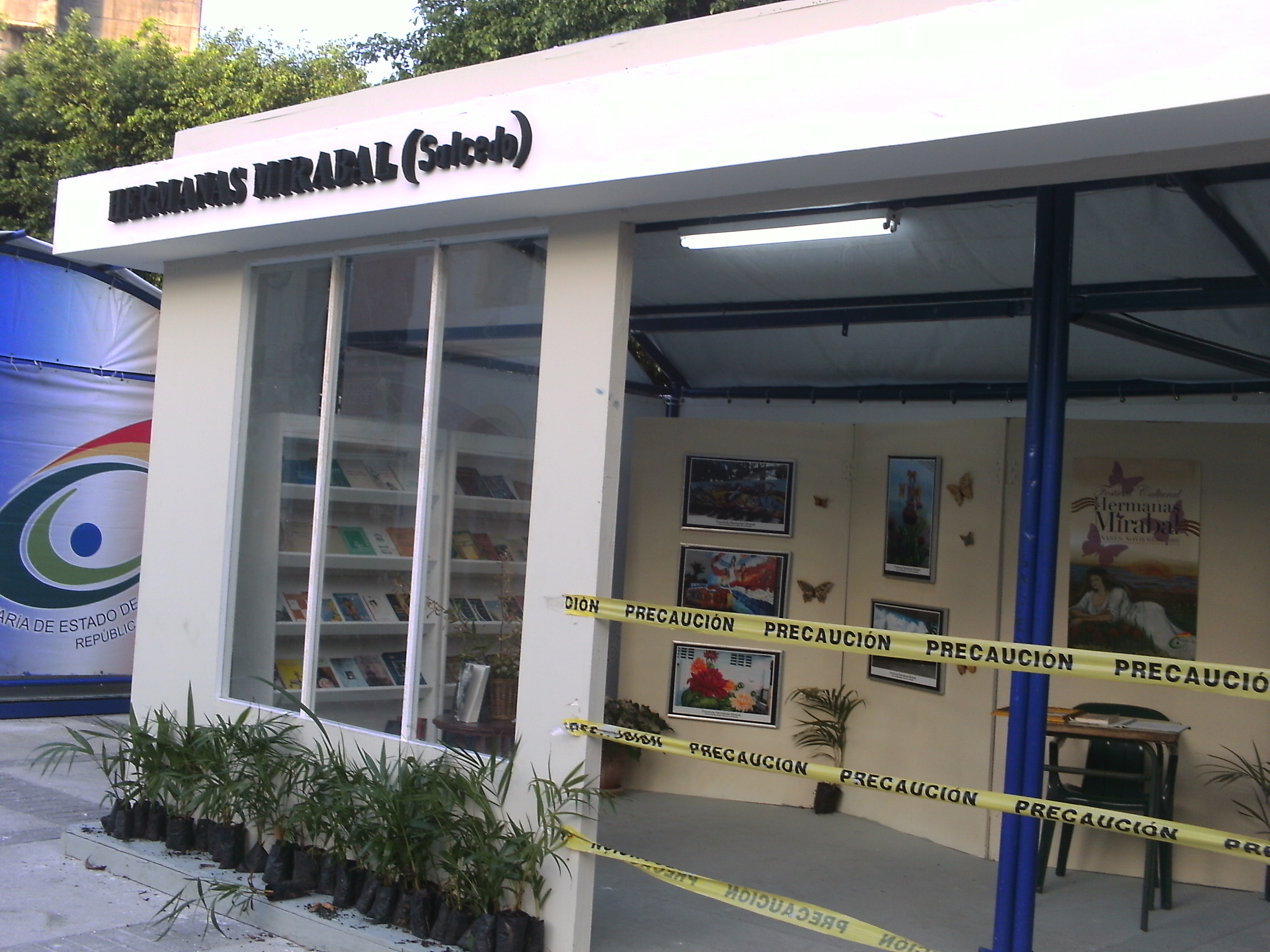
A 2009 book fair in the Dominican Republic

Dominican Republic literature refers to literary works by writers of Dominican ancestry written in or outside of the Dominican Republic, including those works produced both before and after final Dominican independence in 1865. Dominican authors have cultivated all the various literary forms, reflecting in their work the mixture of Spanish, African and Taíno elements that occurs in the Caribbean, and the influence of successive political and economic emigrations.

Modern Dominican literature began with the founding of the first cultural society "Lovers of Letters", to which Manuel de Jesús Galván, Jose Gabriel García, Francisco Javier Angulo Guridi, Manuel de Jesus Heredia, Manuel Rodríguez Objío, and Carrión Grimes belonged, among others. Since then, poetry, novels, short stories, essays and history writing have all expressed the multiple currents of thought that permeate the political, social and economic discourse of the country, especially European and American initially, and from the Far East in the late twentieth century.

The literature of the Dominican Republic continues to be in flux, and in search of greater projection both within and outside the national territory. As part of this, the Corripio Foundation and the State Secretariat for Culture award the National Literature Prize every year.

== Dominican poetry ==
Poetry has had prominent exponents in the Dominican Republic. The 19th century was a robust time for the genre, although the 20th century was even more prolific and saw Dominican poetry mature with the emergence of modernism via the avant-garde movements.

During the colonial period, Cristóbal de Llerena wrote the interlude Octava de Corpus Christi and Leonor de Ovando wrote sonnets. However, the outstanding triumvirate of 19th century Dominican poetry consisted of Salomé Ureña, José Joaquín Pérez, and Gastón Fernando Deligne, the three pillars on which the poetry of that period rested in all of its patriotic, indigenist and psychological aspects. Following them were Manuel María Valencia, the first romantic poet, through to Fabio Fiallo and others who assimilated the influences of European literary currents, and on to the incipient modernism embodied in the three important figures of Valentín Giró, Ricardo Pérez Alfonseca, and Osvaldo Bazil.

But it was not until the emergence of the avant-garde movements in the 20th century that Dominican poetry actually reached the category of the modern. Influenced by French symbolism, Otilio Vigil Díazo introduced the avant-garde in Dominican literature and was a great renovator of national lyric poetry. He founded the first poetic movement of a unipersonal nature and was joined by Zacarías Espinal, calling the movement Vedrinismo because in his verses he tried to do the pirouettes that the French aviator Jules Vedrines did in the air. Vigil Díaz introduced modernism in the form of free verse and prose poems with his books Góndolas (1912) and Galeras de Pafos (1921).

After Vedrines, Dominican poetry experienced another great moment when the trio of Domingo Moreno Jimenes, the philosopher Andrés Avelino, and the poet Rafael Augusto Zorrilla together founded Posthumism (sic) around 1921. They wrote a manifesto that added a poetry of a nationalist character to the avant-garde, rescuing the local color, the landscape, and the identity of the Dominican man. With this school, the Dominican poetic tradition was renewed by incubating new voices that strengthened it, although Darío's influence diminished with the appearance of Posthumism.

The Posthumism movement was followed by the Surprised Poetry movement, made up of Franklin Mieses Burgos, Mariano Lebrón Saviñón, Antonio Fernández Spencer, Aída Cartagena Portalatín, Freddy Gatón Arce, among others. Contrary to posthumism, this group of poets displayed a great aesthetic openness and had as their motto "poetry with the universal man". This was followed by the generation of the Independents of 40, made up of Manuel del Cabral, Héctor Incháustegui Cabral, Pedro Mir and Tomás Hernández Franco, who published emblematic poems such as Compadre Mon, There Is a Country in the World, Poem of a Single Anguish, and Yelidá. From them emerged another group of poets called the Generation of '48, made up of, among others, Victor Villegas, Maximo Aviles Blonda, Lupo Hernandez Rueda, Luis Alfredo Torres, Rafael Valera Benitez, and Abelardo Vicioso.

In the 1970s, after the fall of the Trujillo regime, writers emerged from the sixties generation with Marcio Veloz Maggiolo, Ramón Francisco, René del Risco Bermúdez, Jeannette Miller, and Miguel Alfonseca. In the same decade, and as a consequence of the April Revolution of 1965, the movement called Postwar Poets (or Young Poetry) was born, with Mateo Morrison, Andrés L. Mateo, Enriquillo Sánchez, Tony Raful, Alexis Gómez Rosa, Enrique Eusebio, and Soledad Álvarez, among others.

In the 1980s a poetic movement appeared that shook the literary establishment of the time, which was typified by post-World War Two disenchantment, and laid the foundations for a break with the earlier generation. These poets ignored the ideological and historical circumstances of the country, creating a poetry of thought and reflection on other topics such as philosophy, death, and the erotic. Among these poets were Leandro Morales, José Mármol, Plinio Chahín, Dionisio de Jesús, Médar Serrata, Víctor Bidó, and José Alejandro Peña, among others. This movement led to the formation of groups such as the César Vallejo Literary Workshop, which included Juan Briján, José Mármol, Miguel Jiménez, Tomás Castro, Dionisio de Jesús, César Zapata, Leopoldo Minaya, Rafael García Romero, Evans Lewis, Juan Manuel Sepúlveda, Roberto Reyes, Marcial Mota, Julio Mercedes, Zaida Corniel, Irene Santos, Carmen Sánchez, Dulce Ureña, José Siris, Ylonka Perdomo, Josemon Tejada, and many others. This period also saw the emergence of the poets of Y Punto, made up mainly of publicists, painters and poets, and of El Círculo Francisco Urondo, made up of León Félix Batista, Atilano Pimentel, Víctor Bidó, José Alejandro Pena, Juan de la Cruz, Nicolás Guevara, and Miriam Ventura.

Contrasts arose between the more established poets and independent voices such as Sally Rodríguez and Martha Rivera-Garrido, leading to the identification of Feminine Poetry, the Poetry of the Crisis, and the Poetry of Thought. The Circle of Women Poets of the Dominican Republic was born, made up of Chiqui Vicioso and Carmen Imbert Brugal, among others. The distances and differences within and between these groups varied, with migration playing an important role as many poets dispersed and settled in Puerto Rico, Germany, and the United States, weakening some claques and closing others permanently. The second Circle of Women Poets of the Dominican Republic emerged, including poets such as Ángela Pena, Aurora Arias, and Marianela Medrano.

José Enrique García and Cayo Claudio Espinal were notable transitional poets from the late 1970s and early 1980s, with the poets of the 1990s including Medar Serrata, Ramon Saba, and Cesar Sanchez Beras. Other transitional poets included José Enrique García, author of the book El Fabulador, and Cayo Claudio Espinal, creator of the Contextualist Movement and author of Utopía de los Relaciones, Banquetes de Aflicción, Comedio (Entre Gravedad y Rsa), Las Políticas Culturales en la República Dominicana, La Mampara and Clave de Estambre. Also transitional, Preeminencia del Tiempo appeared in 1993, characterized by an aesthetic and stylistic syncretism that integrated the classical canon with the various avant-garde schools.

== Novels ==
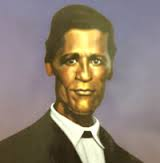
Pedro Francisco Bonó

Unlike poetry, the novel developed late in the Dominican Republic, eventually emerging under the influence of the French romanticism of Victor Hugo. This resulted in the Dominican novel not having the same strength as Dominican poetry, essays, and short stories until the 21st century, despite the great indigenist novel Enriquillo (1879) by Manuel de Jesús Galván.

Candidates for the first novel written by a Dominican include El Montero by Pedro Francisco Bonó, published in Paris in 1856, and Los Amores de los Indios by Alejandro Angulo Guridi, published in Havana, Cuba in 1843. Cecilia, also by Alejandro Guridi, was published incomplete in 1853 in the Dominican Sunday weekly El Progreso (numbers 1–3 and 5–8), and had come out even earlier in the Cuban newspaper El Eco de Villaclara in 1851. These early novels were followed by La Fantasma de Higüey by Francisco Angulo Guridi, Alejandro's brother, published in 1857 in Havana. The first Dominican novel printed in the Dominican Republic was La Campana del Higo: Dominican Tradition, which was published by the García Hermanos press in 1866.

Since then, Dominican novels have been classified into three major periods corresponding to those novels written before 1930, those written from 1930 to 1960, and those written after 1960, with this classification relating to historical events in the nation rather than to firm literary movements. As such, it is possible to highlight three important thematic trends in the evolution of the Dominican novel: the sugarcane novel, the biblical novel, and the costumbrista novel, represented by Cañas y Bueyes by Francisco Moscoso Puello, Over by Ramón Marrero Aristy, and Ginger by Andrés Pérez Cabral respectively. Biblical novels also include works by Carlos Esteban Deive, Marcio Veloz Maggiolo, and Ramón Emilio Reyes and costumbrist novels include The Cacica by Rafael Damirón, Baní or Engracia and Antoñica by Francisco Gregorio Billini, The Crafty by Juan Bosch, and the trilogy of Rufinito, Guanuma and Alma Dominicana by Héctor García Godoy. The propagandistic novel The Enemies of the Earth also merits inclusion.

In the 1960s, the Dominican novelists with the greatest international projection and acclaim were Marcio Veloz Maggiolo, author of a dozen novels as well as short stories and historical-archaeological essays and theater; Aída Cartagena Portalatín, who together with Maggiolo, founded the experimental novel; Veloz Maggiolo with Los Angeles de Hueso (1967); and Aída with Escalera Para Electra (1970). Other novels worthy of mention from this period are La Sangre by Tulio Manuel Cestero, Over by Ramón Marrero Aristy, La Mañosa by Juan Bosch, Biografía Difusa de Sombra Castañeda by Veloz Maggiolo, and La Balada de Alfonsina Bairán by Andrés L. Mateo. A great milestone in Dominican novels was when Only Ashes You Will Find by Pedro Vergés won the Blasco Ibáñez Prize and the Critics' Prize in Spain in 1980.

In the 1980s, a number of novelists stood out: René Rodríguez Soriano, Ángela Hernández, Rafael García Romero, Pedro Camilo, Avelino Stanley, Ramón Tejada Holguín, César Zapata, Manuel García Cartagena; and in the 1990s, Martha Rivera-Garrido, who won the Casa de Teatro International Novel Prize with I've Forgotten Your Name (translated into English by Harvard University professor Mary Berg), Emilia Pereyra, Pedro Antonio Valdez, Pastor de Moya, José Carvajal, José Acosta, and Luis Martín Gómez, among others. Avelino Stanley in particular has a vast body of narrative work, among which Cathedral of Libido, Dead Time, and The Shots stand out. The journalist and narrator Emilia Pereyra has written The Green Crime, Ashes of Wanting, Cocktail with Frenzy, The Cry of the Drum, and the short story collection The Inescapeable Design of God. Santos is the author of Memoirs of a Single Man, Diabolical Passion, and The Second Resurrected.

In 2019, Franklin Gutiérrez published The Dark Face of the American Dream, a novel where the theme of emigration is expressed from multiple perspectives, without obstacles or inhibitions. It won the 2020 National Novel Prize awarded by the Ministry of Culture of the Dominican Republic, and critics have described it as a "great novel of emigration."

== Short stories ==
Although the modern Dominican short story began in the second half of the 19th century, late in comparison to other countries, the genre has had more significance than the novel in Dominican Republic literature. The first legends and tales in the oral tradition reached the island with the intellectuals and religious figures among the conquerors, who spread them throughout the national territory. The first known short story was El Garito (1854) by Ángulo Guridi, and following this 19th century short stories were of a costumbrista nature, typified by César Nicolás Penson, author of Cosas Añejas.

The main exponent of the short story form in the 20th century is Juan Bosch. Considered a master of the genre in Latin America, he wrote three significant collections entitled Stories Written Before Exile, Stories Written In Exile and More Stories Written In Exile. Other 20th century writers of short stories include Tulio Manuel Cestero, Virginia Elena Ortea, and Fabio Fiallo, who was influenced by his friend Rubén Darío to write modernist stories such as Cuentos Fragilees, published in 1908. Other important exponents of the genre are Jose Ramon Lopez, Rene del Risco, Virgil Diaz Grullon, Hilma Contreras, Sanz Lajara, Jose Rijo, Diogenes Valdez, Pedro Peix, Socrates Nolasco, Nestor Caro, and Marrero Aristy, among others.

== Essays ==
The term essay was originally used to designate writings that oscillated between science and literature, but that conception has gradually changed to the point that the category of essay now also includes the exposition, discussion and evaluation of a given topic with the aim of validating the thesis presented in it. The initiator of the genre was the Frenchman Michel de Montaigne, who in 1580 published a series of writings about his personal confessions entitled Essais (Essays). In 1597 the Englishman Francis Bacon published his work Essays, Religious Meditations, Topics of Persuasion and Discussion. Among other European proponents of the essay were Joseph Addison, Gaddhold Lessing, Johann Goethe, Thomas Carlyle, Thomas Macaulay, Hippolyte Taine, Paul Valéry, Thomas Mann and Gyorgy Lukacs. In Spain, where the essay truly took shape in the 19th century, the essayists who gained fame were Ángel Ganivet, Miguel de Unamuno, José Ortega y Gasset, and Americo Castro. Latin America has produced essayists of the stature of Juan Montalvo, José Martí, José Vasconcelos, Pedro Henríquez Ureña, José Carlos Mariátegui, Octavio Paz, and Roberto Fernández Retamar.

In the Dominican Republic, as in almost all of Latin America, the essay emerged formally in the second half of the 19th century and gained notoriety in the 20th century. Its orientation has traditionally been historical, political, sociological and literary, and the political essays of the independentists, the conservatives and the restorers stand out. One of its best exponents in the international arena was Pedro Henríquez Ureña, a renowned author of academic essays on literary topics. The local passion for historical subjects, especially those dealing with the dictatorship of Rafael Trujillo and other transcendental political episodes, has influenced the development of historians of stature in different periods of the Dominican Republic.

It is difficult to establish the starting point of the Dominican essay, since before this genre reached a certain level of maturity in the country there was already a considerable group of writers who expressed their political, social and literary concerns through essay prose. While not strictly an essayist, the Dominican politician, rector, and author Andrés López de Medrano became the first Enlightenment philosopher of the Dominican Republic when he wrote one of the most important philosophical works of the 19th century, a treaty entitled Logic, Elements of Modern Philosophy (1814). But a first wave of national essayists can be seen in the second half of the 19th century in the journalistic writings expressing the revolutionary ideals of the independentists and the restorers, together with the reasons and responses of the conservative Dominican intellectuals of the time. The articles of Alejandro Angulo Guridi, particularly those published in the weeklies El Orden, La República, La Reforma, and El Progreso and later collected in his work Temas Políticos (1891), reflect the level of political disarray in Dominican society at the time. Although less profound than Guridi in his analysis of political themes but more skillful than many of his contemporaries in the perception of local customs and social ills, Ulises Francisco Espaillat motivated many to cultivate journalistic prose.

The annexationist editorials written by Manuel de Jesús Galván in the newspaper La Razón had a fluid and pleasant style. Years later, they were complemented by his defense of Pedro Santana, published in the weeklies Oasis and Eco de la Opinión. Another important figure in this embryonic stage of national essay writing was Manuel de Jesús Peña y Reynoso, author of essays on the novel Enriquillo by Manuel de Jesús Galván and Fantasías Indígena by José Joaquín Pérez. But the most notable Dominican literary essayist of the 19th century and the first two decades of the 20th century was Federico García Godoy, who began his critical work in 1882 in the newspaper El Porvenir and continued until the time of his death in 1924. His opinions were disseminated in important national and foreign magazines and newspapers and in his works Perfiles y Alivios (1907), La Hora Que Pasa (1910), Páginas Efímeras (1912), El Derrumbe (1916), and Americanismo Literario (1918).

José Ramón López, who originally clung to the gastronomic proposal that associates the triumph of the people with the type of food of its inhabitants, was among the first of a number of national intellectuals who disputed the various ideological currents of the island's essay writing, writers like Américo Lugo with The Dominican State Before Public Law (1916) and Dominican Nationalism (1923), Francisco Moscoso Puello with Letters to Evelina (1941), Manuel Arturo Peña Batlle with The Island of the Turtle, Juan Isidro Jimenes Grullón with The Dominican Republic: A Fiction (1965), Joaquín Balaguer with The island upside down (1983), Juan Bosch with The Pentagon, Ssubstitute For Imperialism (1963), and David, Biography of a King (1968). Among them, Peña Batlle, Moscoso Puello, and Balaguer subordinated their thinking and writing to the current known as Dominican pessimism, which was based on the conservative belief that the Dominican Republic was incapable of developing by itself. On the other hand, writers such as Juan Isidro Jimenes Grullón and Juan Bosch relied on sociological and historical discourse to review and rectify many of the approaches of their immediate predecessors.

Currently, Dominican essayists on historical and sociological topics are interested in defining the concept of nationality, racial conflicts, and the social function of local intellectuals. The essays by Manuel Núñez with The Decline of the Dominican Nation (1990), Andrés L. Mateo with Myth and Culture in the Age of Trujillo (1993), José Rafael Lantigua with The Conspiracy of Time (1994), and Federico Henríquez Gratereaux with A Cyclone in a Bottle (1996) are notable examples of this trend. Others, such as Miguel Guerrero with The Last Days of the Trujillo Era (1995, The Wrath of the Tyrant (1996), and Trujillo and the Heroes of June (1996), and MuKien Adriana Sang with Ulises Heureaux: Biography of a Dictator (1987), Buenaventura Báez, the Caudillo of the South (1991, and An Unfinished Utopia: Espaillat and 19th Century Dominican Liberalism (1997) have found the historical past the ideal way to review chapters of national history, especially those related to the role played by several of the Dominican dictators.

The literary essay also began to gain ground from the beginning of the 20th century. Emerging voices were those of Pedro Henríquez Ureña with Critical Essays (1905), Six Essays in Search of Our Expression (1927), and Literary Currents in Hispanic America (1946); Max Henríquez Ureña with Brief History of Modernism (1964); Camila Henríquez Ureña with Literary Appreciation (1964); and Antonio Fernández Spencer with Literary Essays (1960). For the first time in the history of Dominican letters they infused their literary analysis and criticism with scientific objectivity, as more recently, have Bruno Rosario Candelier with The Cultured and the Popular in Dominican Poetry (1979), The Island Imagination (1984), and Mythopoetic Creation (1989); Diogenes Cespedes with Six Essays on Latin American Poetics (1983), Studies on Literature, Politics, Language and Poetry in Santo Domingo in the 20th Century (1985), and Politics of the Theory of Language and Poetry in Latin America in the 20th Century (1995); Jose Alcantara Almanzar with Studies of Dominican Poetry (1979); Daisy Cocco De Filippis with Semiotic Studies of Dominican Poetry (1984); Manuel Matos Moquete with The Theoretical Discourse in Literature in Hispanic America (1983) and In the Spiral of Times (1998); and Franklin Gutierrez with Enriquillo: X-ray of a Galvanian Hero (1999). The most recent National literary essayists, including Manuel Mora Serrano, Miguel Ángel Fornerín, José Enrique García and others, have carried out invaluable work in the national press as columnists, book reviewers, and literary chroniclers.

== Modern Dominican literature ==
By the 21st century, the so-called Transmillenium Lit movement had emerged in Dominican literature, with an avant-garde and/or experimental tendency. Among the Dominican writers of note at the present time are Junot Díaz, who lives in the United States, uses English as his writing language, and won the Pulitzer Prize with his novel The Brief Wondrous Life of Oscar Wao; Pedro Antonio Valdez; Reynolds Andújar, winner of the 2015 Alba Narrative Prize with his novel Useless Gestures; and the poets José Mármol and Frank Báez, who was the only Dominican on the last list of Bogotá39 in 2017. Women writers of note include Ángela Hernández, author of Mudanza de los Sentidos, Charamicos and other works, as well as the winner of the 2016 National Literature Prize; Rita Indiana, writer and popular singer; the poetess Minerva del Risco, daughter of the bard René del Risco; Chiqui Vicioso, winner of the National Theatre Award in 1997 and a feminist who began publishing in the early 1980s but has continued to be active in this century, writing essays dedicated mainly to women; and the journalist Víctor Manuel Ramos, author of La vida Pasajera, which won the 2010 literary contest of the North American Academy of the Spanish Language in the United States, a novel that deals with a Dominican theme despite being written in New York .

== Authors from the Dominican Republic ==
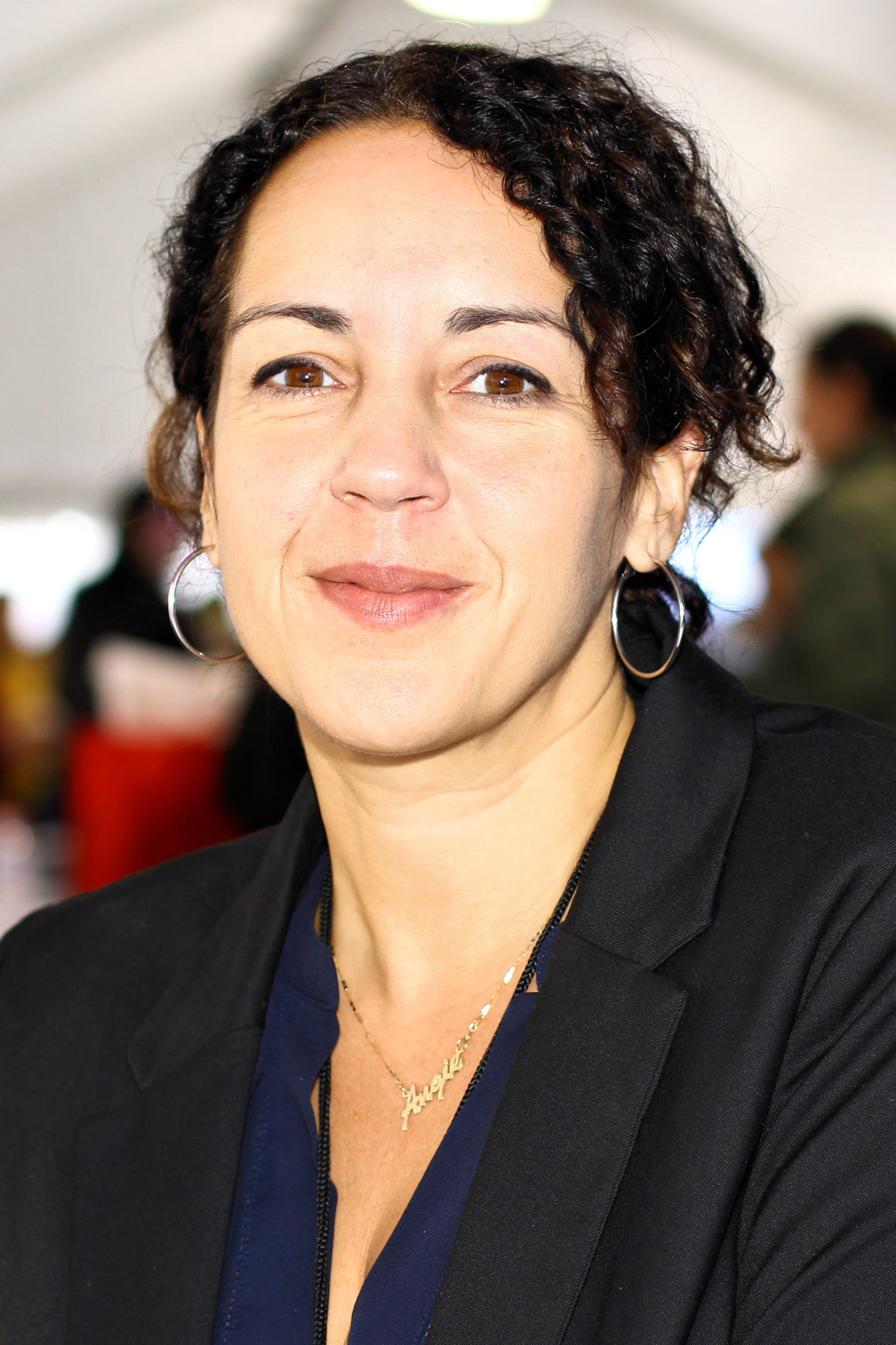
Angie Cruz

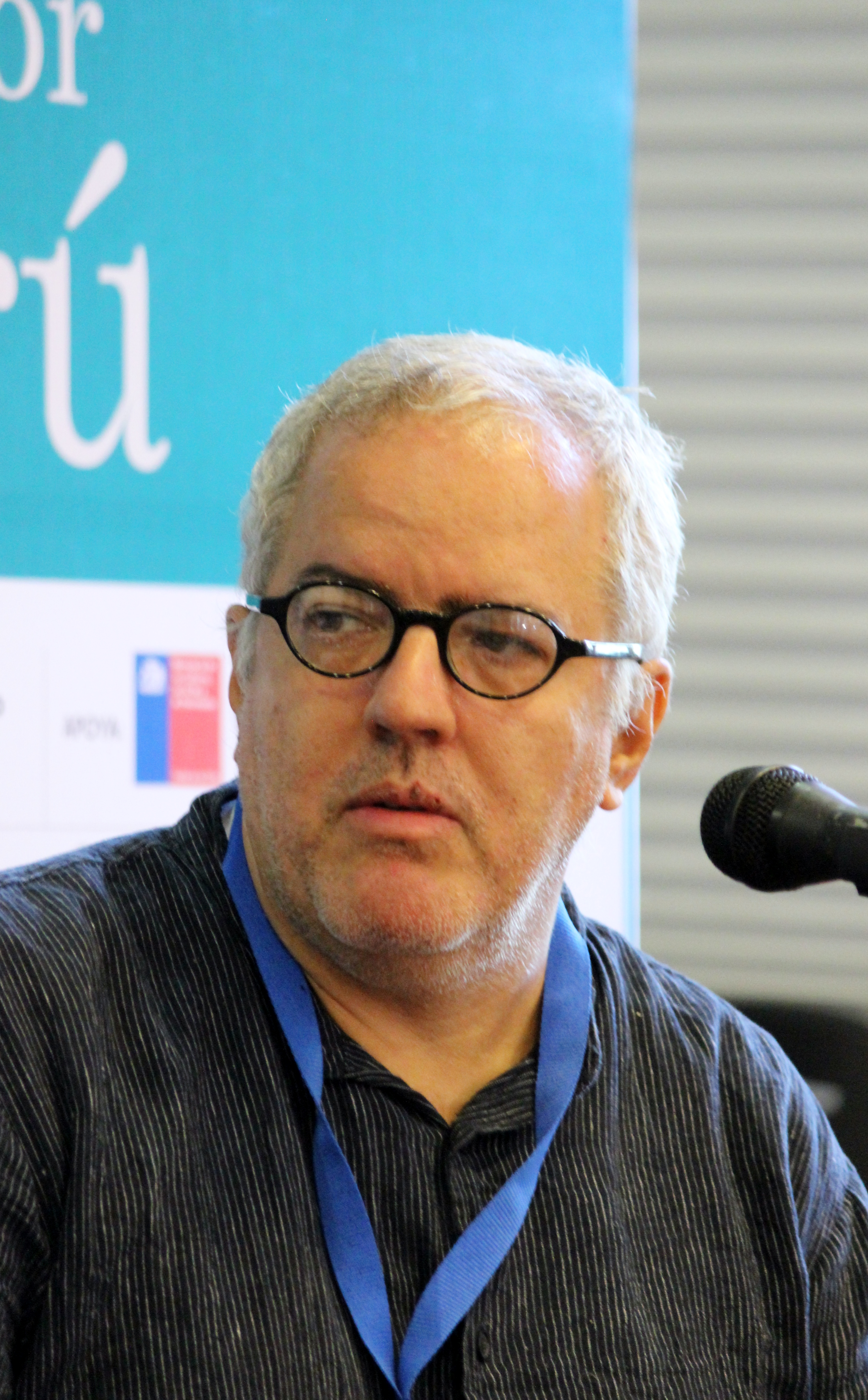
Miguel Mena

- Aída Cartagena Portalatín
- Alfonso Rodríguez
- Alfredo Fernández Simó
- Andrea Evangelina Rodríguez Perozo
- Andrés López de Medrano
- Angela Hernández Núñez
- Angie Cruz
- Arambilet
- Arturo Féliz-Camilo
- Blas Jiménez
- Camila Henríquez Ureña
- Carmen Quidiello
- César Nicolás Penson
- Cristino Gómez
- Domingo Moreno Jimenes
- Fabio Fiallo
- Felix María del Monte
- Fernando Cabrera
- Francisco Gregorio Billini
- Frank Báez
- Irvin Alberti
- Jael Uribe
- Jaime Colson
- Joaquín Balaguer
- José Alcántara Almánzar
- José Gabriel García
- Juan Bosch
- Juan Delancer
- Juan Esteban Ariza Mendoza
- Juan Isidro Moreno
- Juan Pablo Duarte
- Julia Alvarez
- Julio Vega Batlle
- Junot Díaz
- León Félix Batista
- Leopoldo Minaya
- Livia Veloz
- Manuel del Cabral
- Marcio Veloz Maggiolo
- María Isabel Soldevila
- Maria Montez
- Mateo Morrison
- Miguel D. Mena
- Norberto James Rawlings
- Pedro Francisco Bonó
- Pedro Mir
- Rámon Marrero Aristy
- Raquel Cepeda
- Rei Berroa
- René Fortunato
- Rosa Silverio
- Salomé Ureña
- Sócrates Nolasco
- Tulio Manuel Cestero

== See also ==
- Caribbean literature
- Latin American literature
- Mexican literature
