= List of Spanish-language poets =

This is a list of notable poets who have written in the Spanish language.

== Argentina ==
- Jorge Luis Borges (1899–1986)
- Nemer ibn el Barud (1925–2010)
- Jacobo Fijman (1898–1970)
- Juan Gelman (1930–2014)
- Oliverio Girondo (1891–1967)
- José Hernández (1834–1886)
- Roberto Juarroz (1925–1995)
- Nydia Lamarque (1906–1982)
- Leopoldo Lugones (1874–1938)
- Alejandra Pizarnik (1936–1972)
- Alfonsina Storni (1892–1938)

== Bolivia ==
- Jaime Saenz (1921–1986)
- Javier del Granado (1913–1996)

== Chile ==
- Miguel Arteche (1926–2012)
- Roberto Bolaño (1953–2003)
- Sergio Badilla Castillo (born 1947)
- Javier Campos (born 1947)
- Oscar Hahn (born 1938)
- Vicente Huidobro (1893–1948)
- Víctor Jara (1932–1973)
- Enrique Lihn (1929–1988)
- Patricio Manns (1937–2021)
- Carmen Marai - born Carmen María Bassa
- Gabriela Mistral - born Lucila Godoy, (1889–1957) Nobel laureate in 1945
- Pablo Neruda - born Neftalí Ricardo Reyes, (1904–1973) Nobel laureate in 1971
- Nicanor Parra (1914–2018)
- Carlos Pezoa Véliz (1879–1908)
- Mauricio Redolés (born 1953)
- Gonzalo Rojas (1917–2011)
- Pablo de Rokha - born Carlos Díaz Loyola (1894–1968)
- David Rosenmann-Taub (1927–2023)
- Daniel de la Vega (1892–1971)

== Colombia ==
- Luisa Ballesteros Rosas (born 1957)
- Porfirio Barba Jacob (1883–1942)
- Jorge Isaacs
- Rafael Pombo
- José Asunción Silva (1865–1896)
- Gabriel García Márquez (1927–2014) Nobel Laureate 1982
- Olga Elena Mattei (born 1933)

== Cuba ==
- Mariano Brull
- Julián del Casal (1863–1893)
- Gertrudis Gómez de Avellaneda (1814–1873)
- Nicolás Guillén (1902–1989)
- Pedro Juan Gutiérrez (born 1950)
- José María Heredia
- José Lezama Lima (1910–1976)
- Mary Stanley Low (1912–2007)
- Dulce María Loynaz
- José Martí (1853–1895)
- Nancy Morejón (born 1944)
- Virgilio Piñera (1912–1979)
- Roberto Fernández Retamar (1930–2019)
- Severo Sarduy (1937–1993)

== Dominican Republic ==
- Joaquín Balaguer
- Juan Bosch
- Aída Cartagena Portalatín
- Leopoldo Minaya
- Pedro Mir
- Juan Esteban Ariza Mendoza
- Frank Báez
- León Félix Batista
- Rei Berroa
- Manuel del Cabral
- Fernando Cabrera (writer)
- Aída Cartagena Portalatín
- Tulio Manuel Cestero
- Jaime Colson
- Alfredo Fernández Simó
- Fabio Fiallo
- Cristino Gómez
- Chico Gonzalez
- Angela Hernández Nuñez
- Blas Jiménez
- Miguel D. Mena
- Leopoldo Minaya
- Domingo Moreno Jimenes
- Juan Isidro Moreno
- Mateo Morrison
- César Nicolás Penson
- Andrea Evangelina Rodríguez Perozo
- Rosa Silverio
- Salomé Ureña
- Jael Uribe
- Marcio Veloz Maggiolo

== Ecuador ==
- Jorge Carrera Andrade (1903–1978)
- Alejandro Carrión (1915–1992)
- Jorge Enrique Adoum (1926–2009)
- Ignacio Lasso (1911–1943)
- Adalberto Ortiz (1914–2003)
- Pedro Jorge Vera (1915–1999)
- Medardo Ángel Silva (1898–1919)
- Joaquín Gallegos Lara (1911–1947)
- Sonia Manzano Vela (born 1947)

== El Salvador ==
- Alfredo Espino (1900–1928)
- Roque Dalton (1935–1975)
- Alberto Masferrer (1868—1949)

== Honduras ==
- Óscar Acosta (1933–2014)
- Juan Ramón Molina (1875–1908)
- Roberto Sosa (1930–2011)
- Froylán Turcios (1875–1943)

== Mexico ==
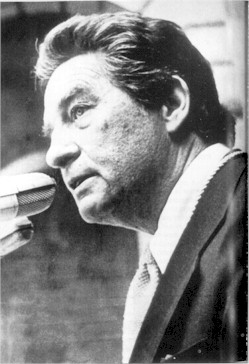
Octavio Paz, Nobel laureate

See also List of Mexican poets

- Elvia Ardalani (born 1963)
- José Carlos Becerra (1936–1970)
- Rubén Bonifaz Nuño (1923–2013)
- Rosario Castellanos (1925–1974)
- Elsa Cross (born 1946)
- Jorge Cuesta (1903–1942)
- Salvador Díaz Mirón (1853–1928)
- Enrique González Martínez (1871–1952)
- José Gorostiza (1901–1973)
- Manuel Gutiérrez Nájera (1859–1895)
- Germán List Arzubide (1898–1998)
- Ramón López Velarde (1888–1921)
- Manuel Maples Arce (1898–1981)
- Amado Nervo (1870–1919)
- Salvador Novo (1904–1974)
- José Emilio Pacheco (1939–2014)
- Octavio Paz (1914–1998) Nobel Laureate (1990)
- Carlos Pellicer (1897–1977)
- Alfonso Reyes (1889–1959)
- Jaime Sabines (1926–1999)
- Sor Juana Inés de la Cruz (1651–1695)
- José Juan Tablada (1871–1945)
- Xavier Villaurrutia (1903–1950)
- Gabriel Zaid (born 1934)
- Esperanza Zambrano (1901–1992)

== Nicaragua ==
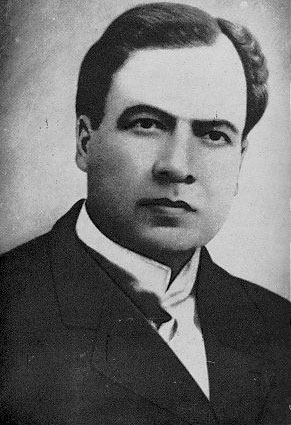
Rubén Darío, founder of modernismo

- Rubén Darío (1867–1916)
- Azarías Pallais (1884–1954)
- Salomón de la Selva (1893–1959)
- Alfonso Cortés (1893–1969)
- José Coronel Urtecho (1906–1994)
- Pablo Antonio Cuadra (1912–2002)
- Joaquín Pasos (1914–1947)
- Claribel Alegría (1924–2018)
- Ernesto Cardenal (1925–2020)
- Gioconda Belli (born 1948)
- Daisy Zamora (born 1950)
- Blanca Castellón (born 1958)

== Paraguay ==
- Julio Correa (1890–1926)
- Renée Ferrer de Arréllaga (born 1944)
- José Ricardo Mazó (1927–1987)
- Manuel Ortiz Guerrero (1894–1933)
- Josefina Pla (1909–1999)
- Roque Vallejos (1943–2006)

== Peru ==
- Jose Santos Chocano (1875–1934) - author of Alma América
- Manuel González Prada (1844–1918)
- César Vallejo (1892–1938)
- Ana María Llona Málaga (born 1936) - author of Animal tan Albo
- Isabel Sabogal (born 1958)

== The Philippines ==
- Pedro Paterno (1858–1911)
- José Rizal (1861–1896)
- Fernando María Guerrero (1873–1929)
- Jesús Balmori (1887–1948)
- Claro M. Recto (1890–1960)
- Adelina Gurrea (1896–1971)
- Guillermo Gómez Rivera (born 1936)
- Edmundo Farolan (born 1943)

== Puerto Rico ==
- Aurora de Albornoz (1926–1990)
- Maria Arrillaga (born 1940)
- Giannina Braschi (born 1953)
- Julia de Burgos (1916–1953)
- Rosario Ferré (1938–2016)
- Virgilio Dávila (1869–1943)
- Luis Lloréns Torres (1876–1944)
- Mercedes Negrón Muñoz a.k.a. Clara Lair (1895–1973)
- Benito Pastoriza Iyodo (1954–2022)
- Luis Palés Matos (1898–1959)
- Evaristo Ribera Chevremont (1896–1976)
- Lola Rodríguez de Tió (1843–1924)

== Spain ==
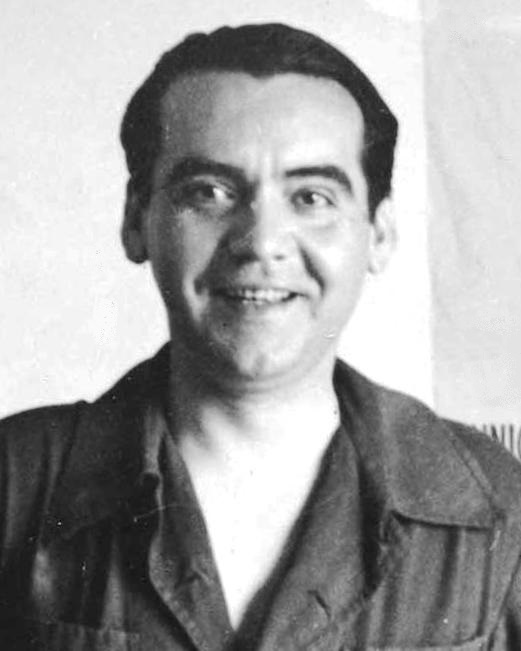
Federico García Lorca was an internationally known poet and dramatist executed during the Spanish Civil War.

- Rafael Alberti (1902–1999)
- Juan Ruiz (c. 1283–c. 1350)
- Juan Boscán (1490–1542)
- Vicente Aleixandre (1898–1984) Nobel Laureate 1977
- Dámaso Alonso (1898–1990)
- Gustavo Adolfo Bécquer (1836–1870)
- Matilde Camus (1919–2012)
- Luis Cernuda (1903–1963)
- Juan de la Cruz (1542–1591)
- Aurora de Albornoz (1926–1990)
- Baltasar del Alcázar (1530–1606)
- Francisco Domene (born 1960)
- León Felipe (1884–1968)
- Federico García Lorca (1898–1936)
- José Luis Giménez-Frontín (1943–2008)
- Luis de Góngora (?–1627)
- Juan Antonio González Iglesias (born 1964)
- Jorge Guillén (1893–1984)
- Miguel Hernández (1910–1942)
- Clara Janés (born 1940)
- Santa Teresa de Jesús (1515–1582)
- Juan Ramón Jiménez (1881–1958) Nobel Laureate 1956
- Luis de León (1527–1591?)
- Rogelia León (1828–1870)
- Antonio Machado (1875–1939)
- Manuel Machado (1874–1947)
- Jorge Manrique (1440–1479)
- Juan L. Ortiz
- Emilio Prados (1899–1962)
- Francisco de Quevedo (1580–1645)
- Pedro Salinas (1892–1951)
- Francisco Sánchez Barbero (1764–1819)
- Garcilaso de la Vega (1503–1536)
- Lope de Vega (1562–1635)
- Esteban Manuel de Villegas (1589–1669)
- Leopoldo María Panero (1948–2014)
- Manuel Curros Enríquez
- Alonso de Ercilla
- Joaquín Sabina
- Íñigo López de Mendoza, 1st Marquis of Santillana
- Gutierre de Cetina
- Juan del Encina (1469–1533)
- José de Espronceda (1808–1842)
- Rosalía de Castro (1837–1885)
- Francisco Domene
- Chantal Maillard
- Antonio Martínez Sarrión
- José Ortega Torres
- Sara Torres
- Leopoldo Panero
- Luisa Castro
- Clara Janés
- Enrique García-Máiquez
- Carlos Martínez Aguirre (born 1974)

== United States ==
- Giannina Braschi
- Sandra Cisneros
- Benito Pastoriza Iyodo
- Juan Felipe Herrera

== Uruguay ==
- Delmira Agustini (1886–1914)
- Mario Benedetti (1920–2009)
- María Herminia Sabbia y Oribe (1883–1961)

== Venezuela ==
- Andrés Bello (1781–1865)
- Enrique Moya (born 1958)
- Aquiles Nazoa (1920–1976)
- Yolanda Pantin (born 1954)
- Arturo Uslar Pietri (1906–2001)

== See also ==
- List of poets
- List of Latin American writers
