= Alejandro Angulo Guridi =

Dominican poet (1823–1906)

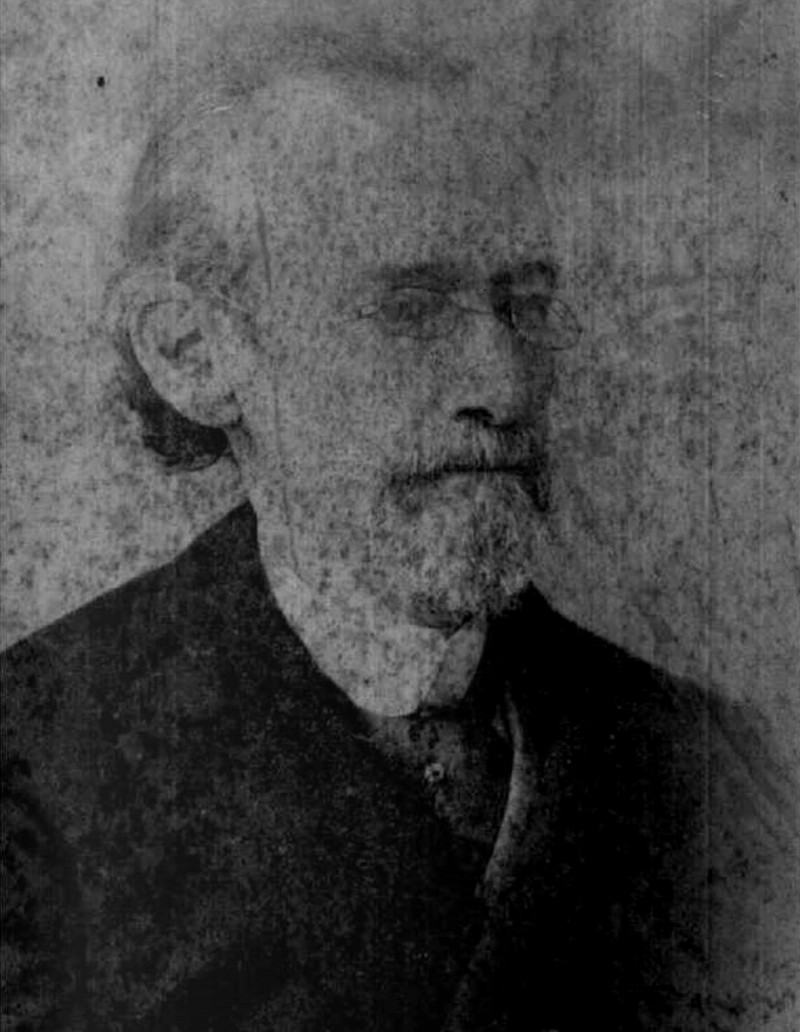
- Born: May 3, 1823; Santo Domingo, Dominican Republic
- Died: January 17, 1906 (aged 82); Masaya, Nicaragua
- Occupations: Journalist; Essayist; Novelist; Jurist; Politician

Alejandro Angulo Guridi (May 3, 1823 – January 17, 1906) was a Dominican writer and politician who held portfolios of Justice and Foreign Affairs. According to some historians, he wrote the first Dominican short story and probably also the first novel (although there is no evidence to support the latter). His contributions to Dominican literature took him throughout Latin America, making him perhaps one of the most influential Dominican writers of the 19th century.

== Early life ==
He was son of the military man Andrés Angulo Cabrera, a Spaniard, and his Dominican wife Francisca Guridi Leos y Echalas-Heredia; he was the youngest of four brothers (the oldest being Bernardo Andrés, Francisco Javier and Ramón María) and the only one who was not born in Santo Domingo, since in 1823 the family emigrated due to the period of Haitian rule.

Alejandro studied at the San Carlos Seminary in Havana, where he began to publish (as did his brother Francisco). There, in 1841, the novels La joven Carmela and Cecilia were published in installments in El Eco de Villaclara (that is, before El montero by Pedro Francisco Bonó, published in Paris in 1856), as well as legends and traditions in La Prensa. At the end of the following year, he published, also in El Eco... in collaboration with Francisco Javier Blanchié, the Cuban novel La vengancia de un hijo and in 1843, he published Los amores de los indios.

In 1846, he graduated as a lawyer and founded the newspaper El Prisma with Víctor Kruger de Hidalgo and Ricardo Delmonte.

Two years later he was accused of conspiracy against the Spanish colonial government in Cuba and after Cirilo Villaverde was imprisoned, Alejandro Angulo fled and settled in the United States.

== United States, Dominican Republic and Venezuela ==
In New York, he wrote for La Verdad, a spokesman for the Cuban independence activists in exile, using the pseudonym J. Cubanacán. In 1851, he wrote El Eco del Ozama, in Santo Domingo, and in August he wrote from Jacksonville to the merchant T. Rosis a letter reflecting the economic hardships he was going through in the U.S.

Alejandro Angulo Guridi arrived in Santo Domingo at the beginning of September and at the end of the year he joined the teaching staff, as a professor of Law and Literature, at the recently founded Colegio de San Buenaventura. He began working as an editor for El Progreso, a newspaper directed by Nicolás Ureña de Mendoza, in February 1853 and there he published in installments a part of Cecilia, his novel written in Cuba.

In March, he obtained the revalidation of his titles issued by the Royal Agreement of the Royal Pretorial Court of Havana and in July he established his law office in the Plazuela de la Merced.

The political, literary and commercial newspaper El Orden, (in which he himself directed), began to circulate on January 11, 1854, and on April 22, he published in this medium, under the pseudonym Taramayna, the costumbrista story El garito, considered the first Dominican story. He wrote poems for the Official Gazette signed as Floriano.

He requested Dominican citizenship in 1856 and in August he published the political, literary and economic weekly La República, which he directed. When Buenaventura Báez assumed power, Angulo Guridi, persecuted, chose to seek asylum in the American consulate, where he remained for two months, until he obtained a passport and safe conduct that allowed him to take refuge first in Curaçao and then to the Turks and Caicos Islands, from where he would return to the Dominican Republic to settle in Santiago.

During the Cibaeño Revolution, he joined the liberal revolutionaries and was acquired into the government of General José Desiderio Valverde, who appointed him editor of the Official Gazette, a position he held until the following year.

In early 1863, in February, he became an advisor to the Council of War of the annexation government and in August he assumed the role of deputy mayor of Santiago; the following month he was taken prisoner on the way to Puerto Plata, when he was traveling with his wife Julia and his youngest son Silverio, and was imprisoned. He remained several months in the jail of the San Luis Fortress, until the last day of December when he left for Washington. From there he went to New York in 1864, where he settled in Union Square and wrote the essay Santo Domingo and Spain; then he boarded the steamer Saladine bound for the Turks and Caicos Islands. Then, passing through Dominican Republic, Haiti and Saint Thomas, they arrived in Venezuela in September.

In Caracas, he continued his work as a lawyer and journalist, working in the company of the Cuban Domingo Ruiz, taught English, collaborated in El Federalista, and is served as a correspondent for the Herald and the Daily News of New York.

== Later career ==
Back in the Dominican Republic, he continued to devote himself to political journalism and literature. During the interim presidency of Jacinto de Castro, he became Minister of Justice and Public Instruction in 1878, and after the assassination of Foreign Minister Manuel Altagracia Cáceres, who was again being considered for the presidency, he assumed this portfolio. The following year, during the government of Cesáreo Guillermo, he became Minister of Justice again, for a short period; in 1880 he embarked again for New York.

A period of wandering through different countries begins: in 1883 we see him directing the newspaper La Nueva Era, in San Salvador; the following year he is residing in Puntarenas, Costa Rica; in 1886, in Nicaragua, where he collaborates with El País, in Managua; in 1891 he publishes the work Temas políticos, in two volumes, in Santiago de Chile, where he is then; the following year he resides in Panama, Curaçao, Chile; in March 1894 he is named rector of Liceo de Tacna, a position he will occupy until 1897, and first mayor of the municipality of this city during the Chilean administration in Peru; there he collaborates with the Tacna newspapers El Tacora and La Voz del Sur; he also writes for the Heraldo de Valparaíso. In 1885, he is again in Santiago de Chile, but continues traveling to Tacna to fulfill his position; In 1898 he returned to Costa Rica and replaced Elías Salazar as director of the Alajuela Institute, went to Guatemala, resided in Masaya, Nicaragua, and traveled to Mexico. In the first half of 1902 he was in Panama, where he wrote for La Estrella; in August 1903 he arrived by steamer to Santo Domingo from Curaçao, but two months later he embarked for Havana determined not to set foot on Dominican soil again; the following year he sailed to Curaçao and from there he went to Cúcuta, in Colombia, and from there he returned to Nicaragua, where he worked as a teacher and director of the Liceo de Varones (or National Institute) of Masaya.

== Death ==
He died on January 17, 1906, in Masaya, Nicaragua at the age of 82.

== See also ==
- José Gabriel García
- Manuel de Jesús Galván
- Dominican Republic literature

== Bibliography ==
- Andrés Blanco Díaz. «Minimal Chronology» in Alejandro Angulo Guridi. Selected Works 1. Articles, General Archive of the Nation, Santo Domingo, 2006; available online
- Alvarez del Real, Maria Eloisa (1991). 12,000 Minibiographies . Panama: Editorial America, S.A. p. 39. ISBN 0-944499-76-7
