= José Gabriel García =

Dominican politician and historian (1834–1910)

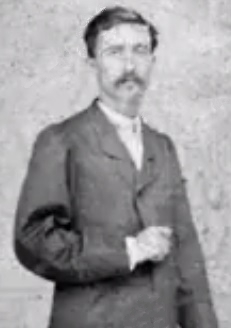

Personal details
- Born: January 13, 1834 Santo Domingo, Dominican Republic
- Died: January 19, 1910 (aged 76) Santo Domingo, Dominican Republic
- Parent(s): Inés García García (mother); Gabriel Rudesindo Costa Ramírez (father)
- Profession: Politician and writer

Military service
- Allegiance: Dominican Republic
- Branch/service: Dominican Army: Liberation Army
- Years of service: 1848–1910
- Rank: Second lieutenant
- Battles/wars: Dominican War of Independence; Dominican Restoration War

José Gabriel García (January 13, 1834 – January 19, 1910) was a Dominican army officer, historian, politician, journalist and publisher. He is regarded as a cultural pioneer as well as the "Father of Dominican History." He was the author of "Compendium of History of Santo Domingo", published in four volumes in 1867, 1887, 1900 and 1906 respectively, and made numerous contributions in the fields of culture, literature and education.

He was the founder of the first Dominican university, the Professional Institute (today University of Santo Domingo), co-founder of the country's first private printing and publishing company, Garcia Hermanos, and founder of the country's first cultural society, "Los Amantes de las Letras" ("Lovers of the Letters"), responsible for establishing the first Dominican theatre and publishing the first Dominincan cultural newspaper, "El Oasis", as well as the first Dominican magazine.

== Biography ==
José Gabriel García was born in Santo Domingo, Dominican Republic on January 13, 1834, to priest Gabriel Rudesindo Costa (Toso) Ramírez (March 1, 1798 – 1841) and Inés García García (1795-1865); He was born during the Haitian occupation. His father, born to Italian Bartolomé Costa (b. Verona, Veneto) and Vicenta Toso (Ramírez) Carvajal of Genoese descent, was a clergy involved in politics who represented Santo Domingo from 1827 to 1832 in the legislative Assembly of Haiti as a deputy.

Many prominent military and politicians were born into the García family. His maternal grandfather, José Anselmo García, was a sergeant of the Spanish Army who opposed to the ruling of the Lic. José Núñez de Cáceres in Fort San José on the night of November 30, 1821. His uncle, José del Carmen García, was one of the signatories of the Manifesto of January 16, 1844, and then served as lieutenant of artillery in the Battle of Azua, on 19 March 1844. His paternal granduncle, Lic./Capt. Tomás (Toso) Ramírez Carvajal, was a lawyer and mayor of the Royal Audiencia in 1820 and Captain of the Spanish cavalry with a decisive role in the Battle of Palo Hincado. José Gabriel García was also cousin of Pedro Alejandrino Pina Garcia, co-founder of La Trinitaria along with Juan Pablo Duarte as well as cousin, twice removed, of Dr. Juan Vicente Moscoso.

== Military and political career ==
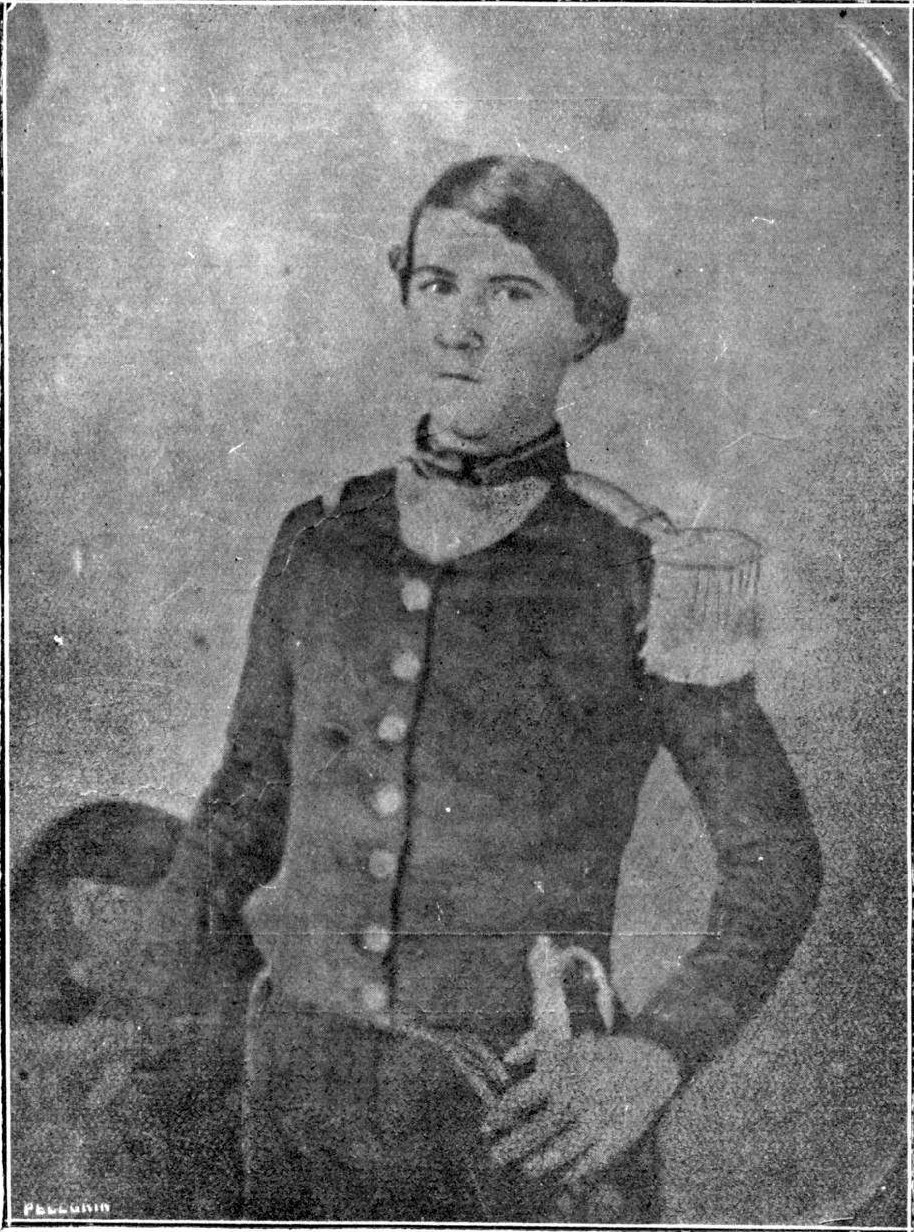
Garcia, aged 19, c. 1853

In 1848, at only 14 years old, García joined the Dominican Army and was assigned artillery brigade of the Plaza of Santo Domingo, commanded by Colonel Ángel Perdomo (military officer). In 1849, he took part of the maritime expedition of Jean-Charles Fagalde during the Dominican War of Independence. As a soldier, he came to perform various administrative functions and reached the rank of Second lieutenant (1853). Accused of conspiracy and pursued by the government of Pedro Santana, who had initiated the reintegration of Dominican Republic to Spain, he had to leave the country in 1861, settling in Venezuela for five years.

Upon his return from exile, he held public office during the second half of the nineteenth century. Among other functions, he served as:

- Mayor of Santo Domingo (1861)
- Minister of Justice and Public Instruction (1865, 1876)
- Advisor to the Executive Board chaired by José María Cabral (1865-1866)
- Triumvirate adviser (1866)
- President of the National Convention (1866,1867)
- Secretary of External Relations (1866, 1874)
- Deputy to the National Congress (1874)
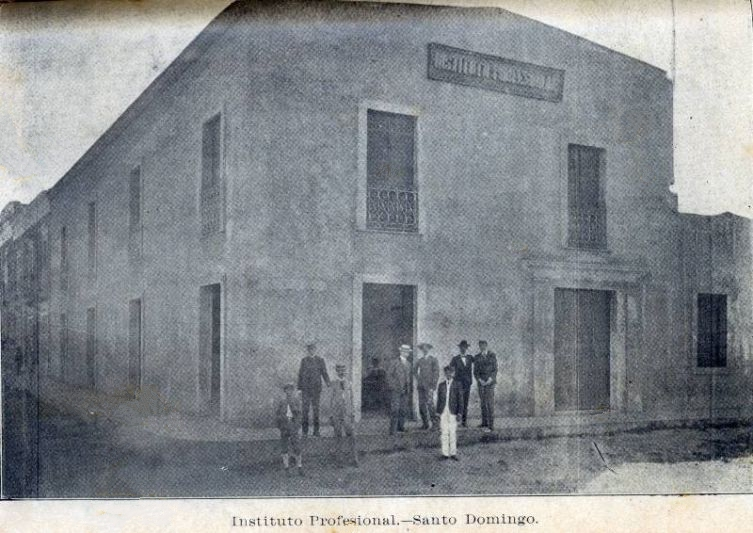
  Instituto Profesional, Santo Domingo, 1906
- Chairman of the Commission nationalizing the Peninsula and Samana Bay (1874)
- Minister of the Army and the Navy during Ulises Espaillat presidency (1876)
- Treasury of Santo Domingo (1898-1908)

In 1866, Jose Gabriel Garcia and Emiliano Tejera created the first Dominican university, the Professional Institute, functioning as a replacement of the previous University Santo Tomás de Aquino (the oldest university in the Americas) which had been closed for more than 45 years and without continuous operation for almost 70 years since the Treaty of Basilea. The Professional Institute was later renamed in 1914 to University of Santo Domingo.

In 1867, José Gabriel García and Emiliano Tejera together with the archbishop Fernando Arturo de Meriño, among others, established the first public library of the Dominican Republic. The donated collections that formed this first public library came from the personal library of the writer Rafael María Baralt

== Los Amantes de las Letras Society ==
In 1854, José Gabriel García founded and was the first president of the Amantes de las Letras Society along with poet Manuel Rodríguez Objío and Manuel de Jesús Galván which was the first cultural society in Dominican Republic and created with the purpose of advancing the intellectual progress of the country by providing access to books, newspapers and magazines. The founding of this first cultural society also gives rise to modern Dominican literature.

The society published the newspaper El Oasis in 1854, which was the first cultural newspaper in the country along with the newspaper El Progreso, covering topics such as literature, religion, customs and culture. In 1859 the society published the first Dominican magazine: La Revista Quincenal Dominicana, which had a political-literary character. A year later, Los Amantes de las Letras published the newspaper Flores del Ozama.

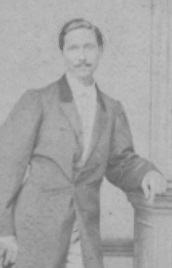
Manuel de Jesús García

In 1860, the society established the first Dominican theatre with a purely artistic orientation. It was located in the former Church of the Jesuits (today National Pantheon) and presented the works of the most notable Spanish and French authors, as well as of national authors such as Félix María del Monte. The theater was inaugurated on October 13, 1860, with the staging of the drama "Los dos Virreyes" by José Zorrilla and the comedy "Zapatero a tus zapatos" and playing as actors: Alejandro Román, Luis Betances, Francisco Javier Miura and brothers Manuel de Jesús and José Gabriel García

José Gabriel García was a member of the Junta Nacional Colombina (1893); corresponding member of the Academia Nacional de la Historia de Venezuela and honorary member of the Academia Nacional de la Historia de la República de Colombia

His writings have been published in newspapers and magazines in Venezuela, Curaçao, Cuba, Spain, the United States and the Dominican Republic.

José Gabriel García had the opportunity to witness and be a protagonist of some of the events in his works.

== Printing and Publishing Company García Hermanos ==
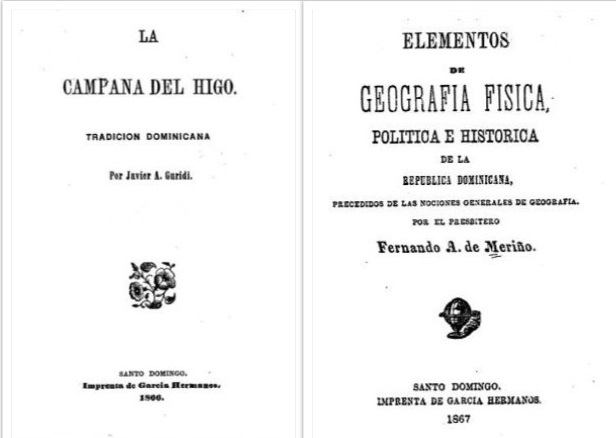
First Dominican novel and textbook printed in Dominican Republic

In 1862, José Gabriel García and his twin brother, Manuel de Jesús García, founded García Hermanos, which included a library, a book store and a publishing and printing company. According to historian Frank Moya Pons, García Hermanos was the first printing and publishing company in the Dominican Republic properly established and it was the leading publishing and editorial company of the 19th and early 20th century in the Dominican Republic. Their book store sold the books of their own catalogue and also imported books. The local also became a hub for the intellectuals of the time.

The first Dominican novel printed in the Dominican Republic was "La Campana del Higo: Tradición Dominicana" by Francisco Angulo Guridi and published by García Hermanos in 1866. Other famous publications of the era like "Lira de Quisqueya" (1874) collected by José Castellanos, "Fantasías indígenas" (1877) by José Joaquín Pérez, "Adela" by Francisco Javiar Amiama (1872), "Los dos restos de Cristóbal Colón" (1879) by Emiliano Tejera, "Poesías" by Salomé Ureña (1880), "Enriquillo" by Manuel de Jesús Galván (1882), "La Hija del Hebreo" by Federico Henríquez y Carvajal (1883), "Las vírgenes de Galindo" by Félix María del Monte (1885), "Poesías" de Josefa Perdomo Heredia (1885), "Apuntes para la Historia de los Trinitarios" by José María Serra (1887), "Moral Social" by Eugenio María de Hostos (1888) and "Madre Culpable" by Amelia Francasci (1893) were also printed and published by the García Hermanos.

The García brothers were also the pioneers in the printing of school textbooks in the Dominican Republic, creating a big impact in the beginnings of the literacy of the country. Books published by them such as "Elementos de Geografía Física, Política e Histórica de la República Dominicana" by Fernando Arturo de Meriño and "Compendio de la Historia de Santo Domingo" by José Gabriel García were edited and printed in 1866 for the use at Dominican schools.

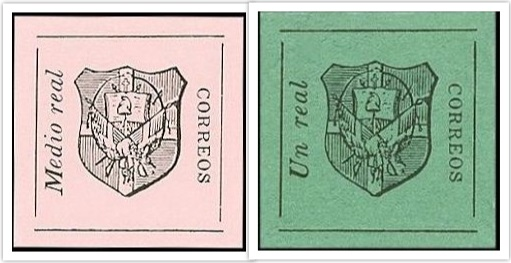
First Dominican stamps by García Hermanos, 1865

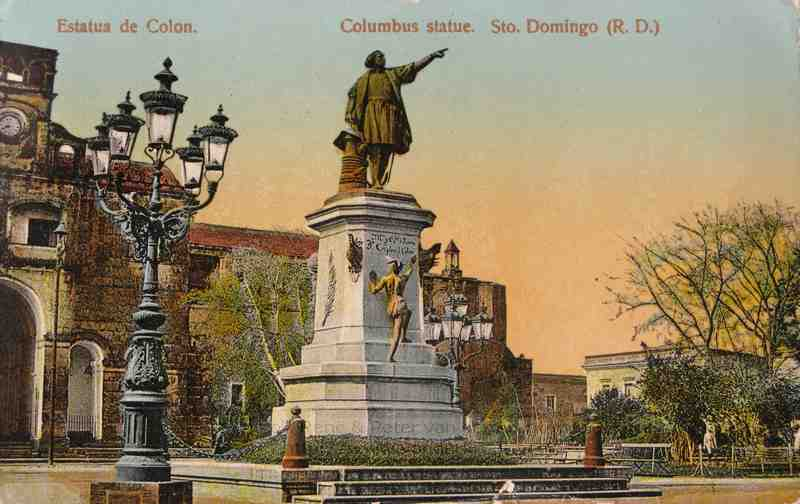
Early 20th c. Dominican postal card by J.R. Vda García

In 1865, García Hermanos elaborated and printed the first Dominican stamps for postage correspondence giving birth to the first Dominican postal system. For decades, they were also the publishers of the Dominican government's Gaceta Oficial. The García brothers were also the mentors and employers of publishers such as José Ricardo Roques, who went on to found La Cuna de América, the second leading publishing company of the time

When Manuel de Jesús García died in 1907, his wife, Josefa Reina, took over the publishing company and it was renamed Imprenta J.R. Vda García, Sucesores. In the early 1900s, J.R. Vda García was the editor and printer of the first Dominican postal cards. Among its famous publications are "Décimas" (1927) by Juan Antonio Alix as well as the first works of Domingo Moreno Jimenes, "La Promesa" (1916) and "Vuelos y Duelos" (1916). The youngest son of Manuel de Jesús and Josefa, Eduardo García Reina, eventually took charge of the company.

In the 1910s, J.R. Vda García became another pioneer this time in the photography industry in the Dominican Republic by being the first company to provide the photo equipments and services of the Eastman Kodak in the country. Eduardo García Reina, was also the pioneer of the gift shops in the Colonial City when he established the store Recuerdos Dominicanos in the Isabel la Católica street around the same time along with the Kodak business.

== Death and legacy ==
García died in the city of Santo Domingo on January 19, 1910. His burial tomb is located in the National Pantheon of the Dominican Republic. His cousin and founding member of La Trinitaria, Pedro Alejandrino Pina García, is also buried there. The remains of his father Gabriel Costa lie in the Primate Cathedral of America and his maternal grandmother, Manuela Rita García, is buried in the vault of the Convent of the Dominican Order.

The four sons of José Gabriel García were also prolific writers, historians and politicians. Out of all the children of both José Gabriel García and Manuel de Jesús García, Eduardo García Reina (who married Rosa Perdomo-Frier Guerra), and his half-sister, Natalia Rita García Rodríguez, were the only ones that married and left descendance.

The old street of "Del Faro" in the Colonial City of Santo Domingo was named José Gabriel García in his honor.

In Dominican Republic, the National Day of Literacy is commemorated on January 13, in honor of the García brothers.

== See also ==
- Manuel de Jesús Galván
- Manuel Rodríguez Objío
- Dominican Republic literature

== Bibliography ==
- "Compendium of History of Santo Domingo, Vol I" (1867)
- "Brief rebuttal of the report of the Commissioners of Santo Domingo. Dedicated to the people of the United States" (1871)
- "Biographical features of famous Dominicans" (1875).
- "Memoirs for the history of Quisqueya of the old Spanish part of Santo Domingo since the discovery of the island to the constitution of the Republic" (1875);
- "Compendium of History of Santo Domingo, Vol II" (1887)
- "Official parties of military operations during the war Dominico-Haitian" (1888).
- "War of Separation: Documents for its history" (1890)
- "Historical Coincidences: Written according to popular traditions" (1892)
- "The Dominican Reader: Gradual course of composed readings for use by the national schools" (1894)
- "Collection of international treaties signed by the Dominican Republic since its inception to the present day" (1897)
- "Compendium of History of Santo Domingo, Vol III" (1900)
- "Compendium of History of Santo Domingo, Vol IV" (1906)
- "Modern History of the Dominican Republic" (1906)
