= Dominican literature =

Dominican literature may refer to:

- Dominican Republic literature, literature produced within the Dominican Republic
- Literature produced by monks, nuns, and friars within the religious order of the Order of Preachers, commonly called Dominicans
