= José Joaquín Pérez (poet) =

Dominican poet (1845–1900)

José Joaquín Pérez Matos (April 27, 1845 – April 6, 1900) was a Dominican poet, journalist, lawyer and politician. As a writer, he was the first and main cultivators of indigenism in Latin America and one of the greatest representatives of Dominican romanticism.

== Biography ==
He was born on April 27, 1845 in Santo Domingo, Dominican Republic. He studied at the Seminary of Santo Domingo under the direction of the priest Fernando Arturo de Meriño. At the age of sixteen, in 1861, he published a political sonnet in which he rejected the annexation of the Dominican Republic by Spain.

Due to his opposition to the Six-Year Government of Buenaventura Báez, Pérez lived in exile in Puerto Rico from 1868 to 1874. Upon his return, he held important public and political positions. He was a senior official in the Ministry of the Interior, Minister of Foreign Affairs, deputy of the Sovereign National Congress, member of the Constituent Assembly, Minister of Justice, Development and Public Instruction and magistrate of the Supreme Court of Justice.

He collaborated with El Nacional (organ of the La República society ), El hogar, La Revista Ilustrada, Letras y Ciencias and Lunes del Listín. He directed the newspapers La Gaceta Oficial, El Eco de la Opinión and El Porvenir. He presided over the first exams held at the Normal School of Santo Domingo to test the educational system of Eugenio María de Hostos and presided over the investiture of the first normalistas in the country.

In 1877, he published his work Fantasías indígenaes (Garcia Hermanos Printing House, Santo Domingo), with which he began to think about the history of the island by assuming the myths of the Taíno people. He was considered "the singer of the indigenous race." He is considered, along with Manuel de Jesús Galván and his novel Enriquillo, one of the great indigenist authors of Latin America.

In 1884, he served as Minister of Justice, Development, and Public Education. He attempted to establish educational projects in highly populated areas of the country, but due to the resignation of President Francisco Javier Billini, these plans never took shape.

Pérez died on April 6, 1900 in Santo Domingo, Dominican Republic. He was 54 years old.

== See also ==
- Manuel de Jesús Galván
- Literature of the Dominican Republic
- Felix María del Monte
