= Francisco Javier Angulo Guridi =

Dominican writer and poet (1816–1884)

Francisco Javier Angulo Guridi (December 3, 1816 – December 7, 1884) was a Dominican journalist and writer. The son of a Spanish soldier, Andrés Angulo Cabrera, who settled the family in Cuba after the first independence of Santo Domingo in 1821, he remained there during his youth and began his career in journalism and literature. He later returned to Santo Domingo, where he participated in the Dominican Restoration War against Spain as a soldier. His brother was also the writer Alejandro Angulo Guridi.

== Biography ==
He was born in Santo Domingo on December 3, 1816. In 1823, perhaps due to the Haitian regime on the island, he emigrated to Cuba with his parents, Lieutenant Andrés Angulo Cabrera and Francisca Guridi y Leoz-Echalaz. He arrived at the age of six and remained there for three decades. He studied until he was fourteen at the San Fernando school. In Havana, he published his first texts and began to develop his journalistic vocation. He wrote his first productions under the pseudonym of Lugano. At just twenty years old, he founded the newspaper La Prensa with other young people and collaborated in different publications in Venezuela and with the Correo de Ultramar published in Paris. In 1853, upon his return to the country, he wrote from the sea the poem ,A la vista de Santo Domingo, which appeared in El Progreso, a newspaper published by his brother Alejandro Angulo Guridi and Nicolás Ureña de Mendoza. He wrote the play, Iguaniona, considered his best work and the first written within the national indigenist movement.

From 1855 to 1861, he lived again in Cuba. Upon his return, he participated in the Dominican Restoration War, in which he rose to the rank of colonel. In Santiago de los Caballeros, he founded El Progreso and later El Tiempo. He was in charge of the direction of the Official Bulletin, as well as El Sol, a literary newspaper that circulated as an organ of the El Paraíso Society. He constantly collaborated with El Laborante and El Dominicano. He held public positions, such as senator and secretary of the Consulting Senate.

During the Second Republic, he comprised with Buenaventura Baez, who had emerged to the presidency following the defeat of the Spanish in 1865. He would go on to support the annexation project to the United States, which placed him at odds against his former comrades during the Six Years' War. Unfortunately, the project ended in failure in 1874, with Báez being deposed from office and exiled. Guridi would live the rest of his life in anguish.

He died in the city of San Pedro de Macorís on December 7, 1884. He was 68 years old.

== Works ==
- Poetic essays
- Geography of the Santo Domingo Islands
- Silvio
- The ciguapa
- The fig bell
- Iguaniona
- The legends
- The Negro Campaign
- The Count of Leos
- The ghost of Higüey

== Bibliography ==
- Balaguer, Joaquin. Javier Angulo Guridi, in his The Proceress Writers. Buenos Aires, Imp, Ferrari, 1947, p. 205-225.
- Villaverde Cirilo. Critical Literature. Poetic Essays by Francisco J. Angulo y Guridi [...], in Faro Industrial de La Habana. Havana, 3 (266): 2, Sep. 25, 1843.

== See also ==
- Alejandro Angulo Guridi
- Felix María del Monte
- José Joaquín Pérez
