= Otilio Vigil Díaz =

Dominican poet

Vigil Diaz
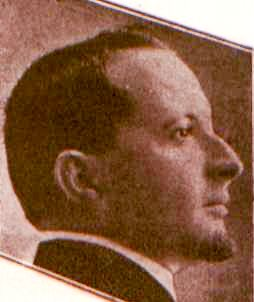
- Born: April 6, 1880; Santo Domingo, Dominican Republic
- Died: January 20, 1961 (aged 80); Santo Domingo, Dominican Republic
- Occupation: Poet

Otilio Andrés Marcelino Celestino Vigil Díaz, commonly known as Vigil Díaz (1880–1961) was a Dominican poet and writer, remembered as an initiator of modern Dominican poetry and the creator of the vanguard literary tendency, Vedrinismo.

His travels and association with avant-garde writers in France, Cuba, and New York compelled him to reinvigorate the Dominican poetic sensibility by rejecting formal models and rhyme, being the first poet to introduce free verse in Dominican letters with his poem, Arabesco (1917).

== Early life ==
Diaz was born in Santo Domingo on April 6, 1880, the son of Francisco Vigil and Isabel Díaz. He studied in primary and secondary school in Santo Domingo, but did not continue to university. He was seen as capricious, eccentric, perhaps lonely and self-centered, though little is known about his life.

== Literary career ==
Greatly influenced by the French literature of that era, Diaz’s travels to Paris, New York, and Cuba in the early years of the twentieth century marked his literary production. He was 32 years old when he published his first book, Góndolas, of prose poetry. Since the beginning of his literary career, Diaz was tied to the postumismo literary movement, however aesthetic differences led him to outright reject any association with the Dominican literary trend also developing at this time.

Díaz's poems and essays were published in a multitude of journals, including Cromos, Letras, La Cuna de América, Renacimiento, Cosmopolita, Bahoruco, El día ético and Blanco y Negro. For many years, he wrote the "Fatamorgana" column, which first appeared in the Listín Diario, later in La Opinión and finally in La Nación.

As the story goes, after the death of Jules Vedrines, the French aviator who had acquired fame on his Paris-Madrid flight for having created the dangerous aerial pirouettes of 'looping the loop', Vigil Díaz, pursuing more experimental forms and the total liberation of the verse named his new sensibility vedrinismo; In this sense, his verses were verbal pirouettes, referring to the phonic game he was looking for in his writings. But vedrinismo only managed to win over a single follower, Zacarías Espinal, who never published anything in life, though after his death some of his sonnets were published in 1961. In fact, some literary critics doubt as to, if ever, Diaz used the word vedrinismo to formally designate any trend or literary avant-garde headed by him. His most famous work, Arabesco, published in November of 1917 in the literary journal La Primada de América, is remembered as the first introduction of free verse poetry in Dominican poetry .

Diaz died in Santo Domingo on January 20, 1961.

== Works ==
- Góndolas (1912)
- Miserere patricio (1915)
- Arabesco (1917)
- Jonondio (1919)
- Galeras de pafos (1921)
- Del sena al ozama (1922)
- Música del ayer (1925)
- Orégano (1949)
- Lilis y Alejandrito (1956)
- Juan Daniel (1957)
- Profesión de fe
- Cándido Espuela
- Rapsodia
