= Enrique Moya =

Enrique Moya (born 1958 in Caracas, Venezuela) is a Venezuelan poet, fiction writer, literary translator, essayist and critic of music and literature. He has published work in diverse literary genres in newspapers and magazines of Latin America, the United States and Europe. He is the director of the Latin American - Austrian Literature Forum and of the Latin American Poetry Festival in Vienna.

== Bibliography ==
- Memoria Ovalada (Eclepsidra, Caracas 2000), Bilingual English – Spanish Edition
- Café Kafka (Labyrinth, Wien-London 2002 und 2005), Bilingual English – Spanish Edition
- Theories of the Skin (La Bohemia, Buenos Aires, 2006), Bilingual German – Spanish Edition
- Vid Søren Kierkegaards grav – Ante la tumba de Søren Kierkegaard, Malmö 2007. Zweisprachige Edition, Schwedisch-Spanisch.
- El mundo sin geometria, narrativa (Eclepsidra, Caracas 2010),
- Poemas de la razón Noctura, Antología (Monte Ávila Editores, Caracas 2012.
