= César Nicolás Penson =

Dominican author and lawyer (1855–1901)

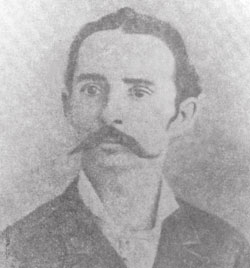
César Nicolás Penson (1855–1901), 19th-century Dominican writer and lawyer.

César Nicolás Penson (23 January 1855 – 29 October 1901) was an author, poet, and lawyer from the Dominican Republic. His book Cosas añejas (1891) is considered to be a representative work of Dominican literature of the 19th century.

== Biography ==
He was the son of Juana Tejera and William Nicholas Penson (an Englishman). He attended an elementary school where he learned to read and write. Later, he attended Colegio San Luis Gonzaga in his hometown, where he continued his studies in languages, music and mathematics.

== Works ==
- Cosas añejas: Tradiciones y episodios de Santo Domingo. Santo Domingo, 1891.
- Reseña histórico-romance en la ciudad Santo Domingo. San Pedro de Macoris: Ouisqueya, 1892.
