= Martha Rivera-Garrido =

Dominican poet

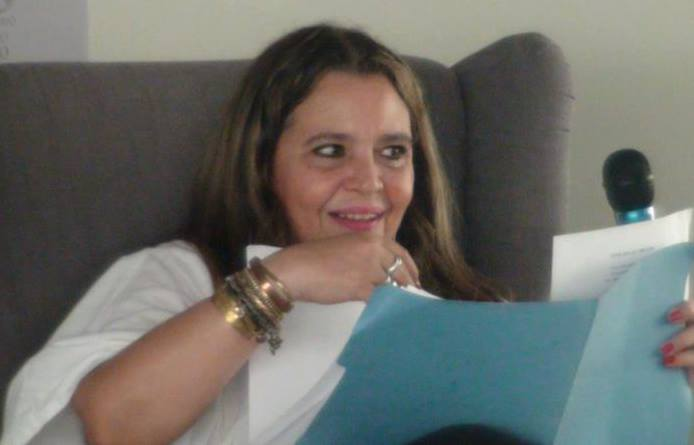
- Inaugurating the poetry pavilion at the International Book Fair in Santo Domingo, Dominican Republic (2013).
- Born: Martha Isabel Rivera Garrido; January 19, 1961 (age 65) Santo Domingo, Dominican Republic
- Occupation: Poet

Martha Rivera-Garrido, also credited as Martha Rivera (born January 19, 1961), is a writer from the Dominican Republic. She is part of the Dominican literary cohort named the 80s Generation. Rivera-Garrido was known primarily as a poet prior to the release of her debut novel, He Olvidado tu Nombre (I Have Forgotten Your Name). The novel won the International Novel Prize of the Casa de Teatro in 1996. In 2013, a street in Santo Domingo was named in her honour.

== Life ==
Rivera-Garrido was born in Santo Domingo. She is the great-granddaughter of the Dominican poet Gastón Fernando Deligne. She studied Political Science at the Autonomous University of Santo Domingo. She has lived for long periods in the United States in New York City and Miami, as well as in San Juan, Puerto Rico.

== Works ==
=== Poetry ===
- 20th Century, aún sin título en español y otros poemas. Ediciones Armario Urbano, Santo Domingo, Dominican Republic, 1985.
- Transparencias de mi espejo. Editora Búho, Santo Domingo, Dominican Republic, 1985.
- Geometría del Vértigo. Editora El Nuevo Diario, Santo Domingo, Dominican Republic, 1995.
- Enma, la noche, el mar y su maithuna.... Editora El Nuevo Diario, Santo Domingo, Dominican Republic, 2013.
- Alfabeto de Agua: Poesía reunida de Martha Rivera-Garrido 1985–2013. Ediciones Ferilibro, Editora Nacional del Ministerio de Cultura, Santo Domingo, Dominican Republic, 2014.
- Enma e altriframmenti, EditoreArcoiris, Multimeida SRL, Napoles, Italy, 2016.

=== Fiction ===
I Have Forgotten Your Name (He Olvidado tu Nombre) is Rivera-Garrido's first and only novel. It won the Casa de Teatro International Narrative Award in 1996. The first edition of the book was released in 1997. The novel was translated to English by Mary Berg, this translation was released by White Pine Press on June 1, 2004. A second edition was released in 2018.

=== Nonfiction ===
- Tonó: Una historia de solidaridad sin límites con las Hermanas Mirabal y su familia. Publicaciones de la Fundación Hermanas Mirabal, 2018, Santo Domingo.

== Awards and honours ==
- 1996 - Casa de Teatro International Narrative Award
- 2013 - Ministry of Culture of the Dominican Republic dedicated a day of the International Book Fair
- 2013 - A street in the Dominican Cultural Plaza in Santo Domingo has been named after her.
