= Andrés L. Mateo =

Dominican writer

Andrés Luciano Mateo Martínez (born 30 November 1946) is a Dominican writer, novelist, poet, philologist, educator, literary critic, essayist, researcher and philosopher. He was the winner of the National Literature Prize in 2004.

== Biography ==
Andrés L. Mateo was born in Santo Domingo in 1946. The son of Antonio Mateo Peguero and Guadalupe Martínez Reyes, his primary education studies were at the Colegio San Juan Bosco, where he wrote his first novel, Pisando los dedos de Dios. He then attended high school at the Liceo Juan Pablo Duarte, where he was the first student leader of the Asociación Nacional de Estudiantes de Liceos Intermedios; he also served as an assistant to the philosopher Armando Cordero. While studying at the lyceum, he began writing for El Caribe, which published his first poems.

In 1965, he founded the La Isla group, composed of young writers who looked to art and culture in social transformations occurring in the Dominican Republic as inspiration. Members of the group included Wilfredo Lozano, Norberto James Rawlings, Antonio Lockward Artiles, Fernando Sánchez Martínez, Jorge Lara and José Ulises Rutinell Domínguez.

Mateo received his Bachelor of Arts degree from the Autonomous University of Santo Domingo. In 1971, he went to Cuba to study and in 1977 he obtained a degree in American literature at the University of Havana. In 1993, he received a Ph.D. in philological sciences at the university for his work on the myths and culture of the Dominican Republican capital of Santo Domingo. In 1978, Mateo returned to the Dominican Republic where he became a prolific writer in the national newspapers, and was appointed co-director of Coloquio literary supplement to the newspaper El Siglo. He became a professor of literature at the Universidad Autónoma de Santo Domingo.

In 1981, he was awarded the National Novel Prize by the Ministry of Education, Fine Arts and Culture for Pisar los dedos de Dios. His 1992 novel, La Balada de Alfonsina Bairán, also won an award, and in 1994, he received the National Essay Prize for his essay on Mito y Cultura en la Era de Trujillo. In 1999, he received the Dominican Journalistic Excellence Award for his newspaper column "Sobre el tiempo presente", published in Listin Diario. He won the National Literature Prize in 2004. Other novels include La otra Penélope (1982) and El Violín de la Adúltera (The Violin of Adultery) (2007); the latter is based on real incidents which occurred in the Don Bosco neighborhood where Mateo grew up. Mataeo's novel La balada de Alfonsina Bairán is set in a brothel during the Trujillo regime. Along with Tony Raful and Pedro Peix, Mateo hosted the television programme titled "Peria de Tres" (Circle of Three).

== Views ==
Mateo has observed that in the Dominican Republic under the dictatorial regime of Rafael Trujillo, the cultural aspect of Dominican history received a prominent place. He also noted that there was a pessimistic view in the country on the development and furtherance of social norms caused by political factors; particularly in the late 19th and early 20th centuries when there was a "Golden age" perception of the country. Mateo in his article published in the Listín Diario has highlighted the period of terror and fear inflicted on the people of the country during the period 1930–1961, and bemoans that Trujillism had frighteningly become bigger than Trujillo himself, which had denied freedom of thought to the people and the press.

== Selected works ==
- 1 poesía (1969; with Rafael Abreu Mejía; Mateo Morrison; et al.)
- Pisar los dedos de Dios (1979)
- Poesía de post guerra/joven poesía dominicana (1981)
- La otra Penélope (1982)
- Camila Henríquez Ureña : la virtud del anonimato (1992)
- Mito y cultura en la era de Trujillo (1993)
- Al filo de la dominicanidad (1996)
- Manifiestos literarios de la República Dominicana (1984)
- La balada de Alfonsina Bairán (1998)
- Las palabras perdidas (2000)
- Pedro Henríquez Ureña : vida, errancia y creación (1994).
- Camila : escritora y maestra (2004)
- ¿Por qué vino Pedro Henríquez Ureña en 1931? (2006)
- Juan Bosch : moralista problemático y otros artículos (2009)
- El habla de los historiadores, y otros ensayos (2010; with Pedro Henríquez Ureña)
- El violín de la adúltera (2007).

== Bibliography ==
- Balderston, Daniel; Gonzalez, Mike; Lopez, Ana M. (11 September 2002). Encyclopedia of Contemporary Latin American and Caribbean Cultures. Routledge. ISBN 978-1-134-78852-1.
- Ferreira, Leonardo (1 January 2006). Centuries of Silence: The Story of Latin American Journalism. Greenwood Publishing Group. ISBN 978-0-275-98397-0.
- García, Mélida; Jiménez, Miguel de Camps (2004). Antología de la literatura gay en la República Dominicana. Editora Manati'. ISBN 978-99934-963-1-1.
- Hulst, Lieven d'. (1 January 2007). Caribbean Interfaces. Rodopi. ISBN 978-90-420-2184-6.
- Miguel, Pedro Luis San (1 May 2006). Imagined Island: History, Identity, and Utopia in Hispaniola: History, Identity, and Utopia in Hispaniola. Univ of North Carolina Press. ISBN 978-0-8078-7699-2.
