= Felix María del Monte =

Dominican writer and poet (1819–1899)

Felix María del Monte (November 19, 1819 – April 23, 1899) was a Dominican poet, playwright, journalist, orator, politician and teacher. He participated in the independence struggles that culminated with the proclamation of the Dominican Republic. He served as deputy and Minister of Foreign Affairs and Justice. He composed the first National Anthem, with music by Juan Bautista Alfonseca, which was in force until 1884.

== Early life ==
He was born in 1819 in the city of Santo Domingo during the España Boba era. His father, José Joaquín del Monte, like many Dominicans, had fled the island to evade the Haitian incursions of 1801 and 1805. This was the case as his older brother, Manuel, was born in Puerto Rico, a nearby Spanish colony, in 1804. The family returned to the island when Juan Sánchez Ramírez reincorporated the colony to Spain after victory in the war of reconquest in 1809.

== Political career ==
He later served as part of the secret independence society La Trinitaria. He participated in the events of Puerta del Conde during the feat of February 27, 1844. He wrote the lyrics of the first Dominican National Anthem in 1844, whose music was composed by Colonel Juan Bautista Alfonseca.

He turned out to be the first Dominican to obtain the title of lawyer in the First Republic period, which was issued to him by the Supreme Court of Justice on August 11, 1845. That same year, he, along with Nicolás Ureña de Mendoza, founded El Dominicano, the first newspaper of the Dominican Republic. Years later, he served as Dean of Lawyers in his capacity as the oldest lawyer. His oratory was one of the most vibrant during the first two republics, perhaps due to his work El Porvenir (1854).

He later lived in exile on the island of Puerto Rico in 1855 and wrote El arp del proscrito and the Sonnet A mi patria, after the annexation to Spain in 1861 by the Dominican dictator Pedro Santana.

After the Dominican Republic regained its independence from Spain in 1865, he would align himself with Buenaventura Báez, another caudillo whom Del Monte came to see as a more fitting leader of the country. He would collaborated with the Báez administration, even joining the Red Party. This regime, which sought to annex the newly restored Dominican Republic to the United States, became known as the Six Years' regime.

He died in Santo Domingo, on April 23, 1899, at the age of 79.

== Literary work ==
Del Monte has been called the "Father of Dominican Theater." A highly successful author, his plays were presented at the Teatro La República. His style of poetry, characterized by musicality fused with romanticism, earned him a level of popularity that by 1853, he was recognized in an anthology of Spanish and American poets published in Paris. His first play was Duvergé, in which he condemned the murder of the patriot Antonio Duvergé by Pedro Santana. He also wrote works in verse such as El Mendigo de la Catedral de León and El Premio de los Pichones. His last work was the zarzuela entitled Ozema o La Virgen Indiana. Some of his work include the following:

- The Virgin of Galindo or the invasion of Haitians from the Spanish part of the Island of Santo Domingo, February 9, 1822, 1885
- Antonio Duvergé on the victims of the 14th of April, 1894
- El mendigo de la cathedral de Lyon, 1894
- Ozama, o la virgen indígena, 1894
- El artista Antonio Brito, 1894
- The Last Abencerraje, 1894
- El premio de los pichones
- Un vals de Strauss

== See also ==
- Literature of the Dominican Republic
- Alejandro Angulo Guridi
- Manuel Rodríguez Objío

== Sources ==
- CarineInsider – Félix María del Monte
- EnCaribe – Enciclopedia de Historia y Cultura del Caribe – Félix María del Monte
- Buenos Tareas – Autores dominicanos – Félix María del Monte
