= Arturo Féliz-Camilo =

Dominican chef and author

Arturo Féliz Camilo
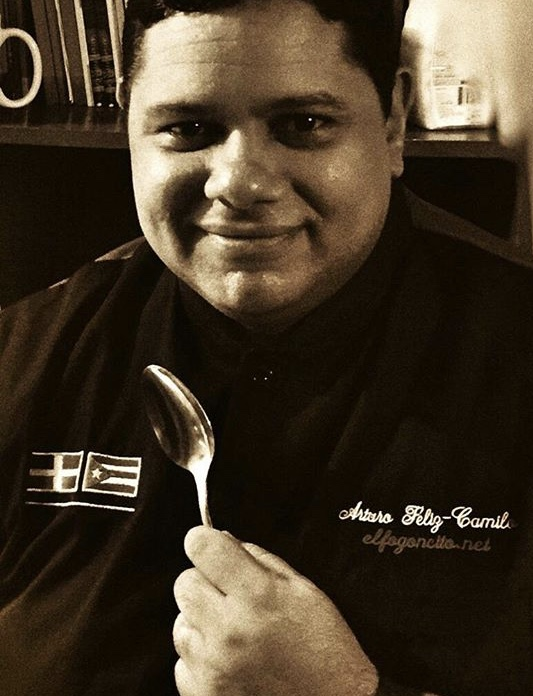
- Chef Arturo Féliz-Camilo
- Born: Arturo Féliz-Camilo; Santo Domingo, Dominican Republic
- Education: Universidad Autonoma de Santo Domingo (LL.B.); Pontificia Universidad Catolica Madre y Maestra (M.L.)
- Spouse: Zobeira Gil
- Culinary career
- Cooking style: Dominican, Puerto Rican, and Caribbean food
- Website: arturofeliz.com

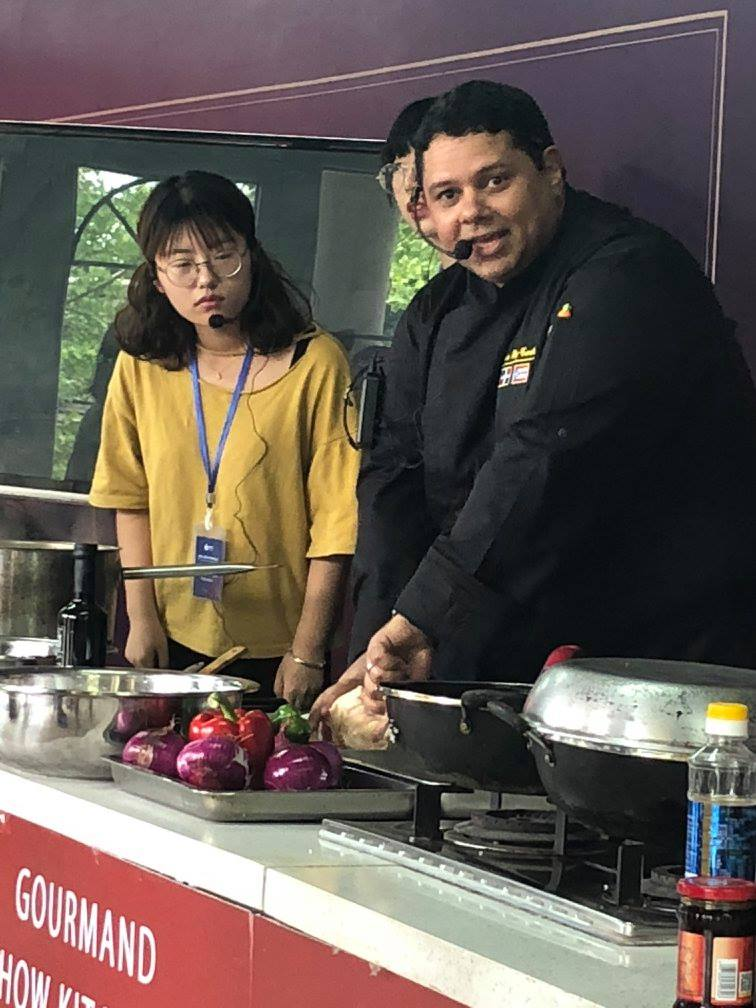
Dominican food cooking show at Yantai, China's Gourmand 2018

Arturo Féliz-Camilo is a Dominican author, chef, academic, and lawyer. He has published about a variety of topics, but is most well known for his cookbooks, usually about Dominican food and its origins, traditions, and culture.

== Early life ==
Arturo Féliz-Camilo was born in Santo Domingo, Dominican Republic in 1977 to Danilo A. Féliz-Sánchez and Ana Antonia Camilo.

Féliz-Camilo graduated magna cum laude from Universidad Autonoma de Santo Domingo with a bachelor in law. He holds a master's degree in corporate law from Pontificia Universidad Catolica Madre y Maestra. He is also a professional interpreter, certified by Language Line Services and has completed graduate studies in history from the University of South Florida, anthropology from Macquarie University, sociology from the University of Western Sydney, The Origins of Crime, from Griffith University, Human Evolution from the American Museum of Natural History and canon law and bible interpretation from Seminario Pontificio Santo Tomás de Aquino.

Féliz-Camilo has published books about law, politics, Catholic apologetics, Dominican food, culture, myths and legends, and other Dominican culture-related topics.

== Early cooking career ==
Arturo's cooking style and influences come from family traditional cooking and years of his own research in the Dominican countryside. His style is generally traditional Dominican cookery. He has said that he is somewhat opposed to the "New Dominican Style" and "Dominican Fusion Food". His rationale is that Dominican food is paramount to the Dominican identity and as such it should be cared for and promoted so that it is known before it's "tainted by fusion".

As many other traditional cooks, Arturo started to learn and cook from a very early age with his grandmother, "Mamá Pura", and his mother "Mamá Antonia". He believes his cooking is part of his being Dominican and Taíno. Arturo comes from a very ancient Dominican family, tracing his origins back to the Native American Taíno tribe. He also claims Puerto Rican ancestry and has spent considerable time learning the Caribbean recipes that make the core of his menus.

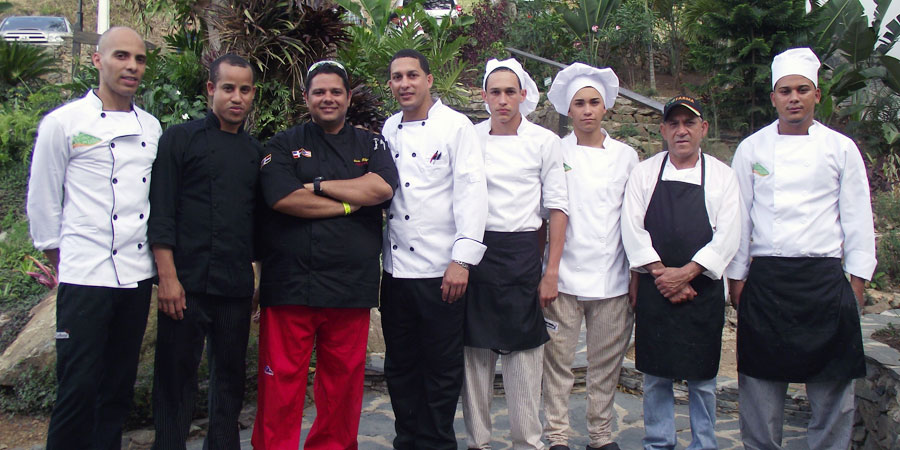
Féliz-Camilo at Aroma de la Montaña Restaurant. Jarabacoa, Dominican Republic.

== Cookbooks ==
Arturo Féliz-Camilo's cookbooks have won multiple Gourmand World Cookbook Awards.

In 2014, his book, Diccionario Culinario Dominicano ("The Dominican Cooking Lexicon") won in the national Gourmand category for food literature.

In 2017, his book Longaniza Dominicana won the Gourmand national categories for "meats" and "self-published" book. Longaniza Dominicana was shortlisted for the world finals in the "single subject category", going on to place 3rd, and the "Best in the World" cookbook denomination.

== Television ==
Féliz-Camilo has consulted for TV shows including Andrew Zimmern's Bizarre Foods. He made an appearance in season 17, episode 5: "Discovering Columbus".

== Professional life ==
Féliz-Camilo teaches World, United States and Dominican history, as well as debate. He also consults on Dominican Food, History, and Culture, and is frequently featured on Dominican Republic and international cooking shows.

He is married and has three children: two girls and a boy.

== Awards and recognition ==
- Diccionario Culinario Dominicano. In 2014 won best cookbook of food literature for Dominican Republic
- Longaniza Dominicana. In 2017 won best cookbook in the meats and self-published categories
- Longaniza Dominicana. In 2018 won "Best in the World" (3rd place) in the single subject category
- Donus D. Roberts Coach Award, Quadruple Ruby National Speech and Debate Association Coach. February, 2018.
- Longaniza Dominicana. In 2020 was announced as "Best of the Best 25" (Best in the last 25 years) in the single subject category

== Bibliography ==
  - Historia, cuentos, leyendas y fábulas de familia. April, 2012. ISBN 1304097102
  - Las recetas de Mamá Pura. April, 2012. ISBN 1475280831
  - El árbol de la felicidad y otros cuentos velados. August, 2012. ISBN 1477633766
  - Porvenir Regulatorio del Mercado de Valores de la República Dominicana. August, 2012. ISBN 1479141836
  - Colección Completa Artículos Socio-Políticos I. 2008. August, 2012. ISBN 1475269633
  - Colección Completa Artículos Socio-Políticos II. 2009. August, 2012. ISBN 1475271433
  - Colección Completa Artículos Socio-Políticos III. 2010–2011. August, 2012. ISBN 147527176X
  - Colección Completa Artículos Socio-Políticos. 2008–2011. August, 2012. ISBN 1479141879
  - The Lost Garden and Other Veiled Tales. November, 2012. ISBN 147911622X
  - Mama Pura's Recipes. May, 2013. ISBN 1489505342
  - The best of Dominican desserts. May, 2013. ISBN 148957025X
  - Los mejores postres dominicanos. May, 2013. ISBN 1489558934
  - The Dominican Cooking Lexicon. May, 2013. ISBN 1484102703
  - Diccionario Culinario Dominicano. May, 2013. ISBN 1484011112
  - Catolicismo Evangélico. June, 2013. ISBN 1477414886
  - Las falsas denominaciones cristianas. June, 2013. ISBN 1490391088
  - El protocolo de la Miel y la frontera dominico-haitiana. May, 2013. ISBN 1477415475
  - El sazón de la cocina dominicana. September, 2013. ISBN 1492833576
  - Dominican Spice. October, 2013. ISBN 1492871699
  - Las recetas de Mamá Pura. Edición Especial. January, 2014. ISBN 1494989778
  - How to Make Dominican Longaniza. September 2016. ISBN 1539009874
  - Longaniza Dominicana. January 2017. ISBN 1542326850
