= Marianela Medrano =

Dominican poet, writer, and psychotherapist

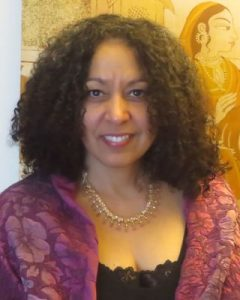

Marianela Medrano is a Dominican poet, writer, and psychotherapist based in the United States. Her work explores themes of identity, spirituality, and the psychological dimensions of healing, often drawing on Afro-Caribbean and Indigenous traditions. Medrano is recognized for her contributions to both literary and therapeutic fields.

== Early life and education ==
Medrano was born in the Dominican Republic and began publishing poetry in the 1980s. She moved to the United States in 1990 and later earned a Ph.D. in Transpersonal Psychology at Sofia University in 2007. Her therapeutic training includes mindfulness meditation, trauma-sensitive mindfulness (TSM), and eye movement desensitization and reprocessing (EMDR).

== Professional work ==
Medrano is the author of several poetry collections, including Oficio de Vivir (1986), Curada de Espantos (2002), and Rooting (2017). Her bilingual and spiritually-infused poetry has been translated into French and Italian and featured in international literary journals.

Medrano is a certified poetry therapist and licensed professional counselor, and the founder of Palabra Counseling and Training Center, which offers culturally sensitive mental health and educational services. Her work combines an emphasis on love and communal support with writing and therapeutic practice. She has experience with a wide range of mental health issues such as addiction, eating disorders, depression, anxiety, and various trauma-based modalities.

Medrano has lectured and led workshops in countries including Spain, India, Colombia, El Salvador, Panama, the Dominican Republic, and Puerto Rico. She has represented the Dominican Republic at international poetry festivals such as the Festival Internacional de Poesía de Medellín [International Poetry Festival of Medellín]. She also served as host and organizer of Confluencia, a decade-long multilingual poetry series at Naugatuck Valley Community College (NVCC) in Connecticut, for which she was presented a Presidential Medal of Honor by the college.

== Notable collections ==
- Oficio de Vivir (1986)
- Los Alegres Ojos de la Tristeza (1987)
- Curada de Espantos (2002)
- Diosas de la Yuca (2011)
- Prietica (2013)
- Rooting (2018)

== Awards and recognition ==
- Outstanding Achievement Award from the National Federation of Biblio Poetry Therapy (2009)
- Presidential Medal of Honor from Naugatuck Valley Community College (NVCC) for her contributions to the literary arts and multicultural education (2018)
- Street dedicated to her at the XV Feria Internacional del Libro Santo Domingo 2012.
