= Ramón Marrero Aristy =

Dominican author (1913–1959)

Ramón Marrero Aristy Beltré
- Born: 14 June 1912; San Rafael del Yuma, La Altagracia, Dominican Republic
- Died: 17 July 1959 (aged 47); Santo Domingo, Dominican Republic
- Education: University of Santo Domingo

Ramón Marrero Aristy Beltré (14 June 1912 – 17 July 1959) was a Dominican author, journalist, politician and historian. He is renowned as a writer of realist novels, especially those set around sugar-cane, and highlighted the abuse to which sugar industry workers were subject. On July 17, 1959, he was assassinated on orders of generalissimo Rafael Trujillo.

== Early life and education ==
Ramón Marrero Aristy Beltré was born in the town of San Rafael del Yuma, La Altagracia Province, Dominican Republic to Juan Bautista Aristy Marrero and Olivia Beltré on 14 June 1913. His family was quite affluent and so he spent his early years living a comfortable life in the countryside; however, due to the United States occupation of the Dominican Republic (1916–1924) he went into exile with his parents. His years in exile were spent in: Colombia, Venezuela and the Dutch Antilles. Finally in 1922 he returned along with his parents to the Dominican Republic.

Upon their return the Aristy family were unable to once again establish themselves in their lands in the east of the country; instead they settled in the south western part of the country. Up till the year 1929 the Aristy family was lived in their south western holdings and went through rough times attempting to rebuild their destroyed fortune. Nevertheless, Ramón Marrero Aristy was able to find time for his education.

In 1928, at age 16 Aristy was a correspondent for two Dominican newspapers: 'El Diario' (Santiago de los Caballeros and 'El Nuevo Diario' (Santo Domingo) in addition to working at a laundry.

The remaining part of his adolescence was spent in the Eastern town of La Romana where he continued his education and worked at the Central Romana Corporation's food warehouse. While working at the warehouse he was a first-hand witness to the abuses of sugar labourers were subjected to.

He left the Central Romana's warehouse and moved to the capital, Santo Domingo, where he graduated from secondary school and entered the University of Santo Domingo (now Autonomous University of Santo Domingo) pursuing a degree in journalism. He left the university without graduating but became a frequent writer in nationwide newspapers such as: Listín Diario, El Caribe and La Nación.

== Literary career ==
Three years after moving to Santo Domingo, in 1938 Marrero Aristy published his first book, Balsié. One year later, he published the novel Over in which he detailed what he had witnessed while working at the Central Romana warehouse, especially how the sugar labourers were forced to over-pay for their food products (hence the title.)

== Political career ==
In his youth, he became interested in socialism. He wrote for many newspapers including Listín Diario, El Radical, El Novel, El Tiempo, La Actualidad, La Avispa, La Opinión, and La Nación, of which he was director as well as for the journal Babeque. Described as an underground marxist dissident, communist, and romantic marxist, he was involved in the few existing clandestine resistance groups left, up until the end of the 1930s, when he decided to serve in Trujillo’s regime in 1940, after Manuel Arturo Peña Batlle, another important dissident intellectual, accepted a position in the government. Marrero Aristy served in many important official positions thereafter.

In 1946 he won the trust of the dictator when he acted as mediator of the agreement signed between Trujillo and the Cuban and Dominican communists, which allowed certain civil liberties and the formation of the Partido Socialista Popular Dominicano. From this, Trujillo commissioned him in 1954 to write the official Dominican history.

He was a Deputy to the National Congress in the periods of 1948–1950 for Azua, from 1950 to 1952 for El Seibo and from 1954 to 1957 for Santo Domingo. He was Secretary of State for Labor from 1957 to 1959 and represented the Dominican Government in diplomatic missions. In 1957, as Secretary of Labor, he wrote a confidential report to Trujillo informing him of the exploitation of the coffee workers.

His last liberal performance, to which his murder is attributed, were the statements he offered to the journalist Tad Szulc, of the New York Times, denouncing the existing corruption in the government, provoking the wrath of the tyrant.

== Death ==
He was assassinated on July 17, 1959, in the National Palace and transferred along with his assassinated driver, Luis Concepción, to the Cazabito hill, Constanza, to fake a car accident.

Trujillo held him responsible for the content of an article published on July 12, 1959, in The New York Times, in which his government was accused of being corrupt. A week later, his body was found charred inside his car on a cliff on the Santo Domingo-Constanza highway. He died on July 17 at the age of 47.
