= Juan Isidro Moreno =

- Born: 6 August 1924; Mata del Jobo, Sabaneta
- Died: 4 January 2015 (aged 90); Santiago de los Caballeros
- Spouse: Ana Mercedes García Fernández
- Children: Guillermo Moreno García

Juan Isidro Moreno Espinal (Mata del Jobo, Sabaneta; 6 August 1924 – Santiago; 4 January 2015) was a poet from the Dominican Republic.

He was the eldest son of Domingo Moreno Jimenes, the developer of the Posthumist movement.

== Works ==
- Vida y Poesía
