= Leopoldo Minaya =

Dominican-American poet (born 1963)

- Born: November 15, 1963 (age 62)
- Occupation: Poet

Leopoldo Minaya (born November 15, 1963) is a Dominican-American poet. He is a member of the Generation of 1980 literary movement in the Dominican Republic. He won the 2001 Miguel de Cervantes Cultural Association Award. His works have been published by various Spanish and Dominican publications. Minaya has a doctorate in law from the University of Santo Domingo and took graduate studies in urban education at Mercy College in the United States. Minaya is also a member of the Writers' International Society.

== Bibliography ==
- Oscilación de Péndulo, 1984, Dom. Rep.
- Preeminencia del Tiempo, 1993, Dom. Rep.
- Preeminencia del Tiempo y Otros Poemas, 1998, Dom. Rep.
- Cuento de los dos Quijotes, 2001, Spain.
- La Hora Llena, 2007, West Virginia, USA.
- Poemas Imaginarios, 2007, West Virginia, USA.
- Historia de la Doncella que fue a la Guerra, 2007, Dom. Rep.
- Historia del Niño René Rosales y de la Flauta Encantada, 2007, Dom. Rep.
- Romance del Pastorcillo, 2007, Dom. Rep.
- Leyenda de Puerto Rico, 2007, Dom. Rep.
- Cantar de Flor y Sombrerito, 2007, Dom. Rep.
- El Conde Niño (Versión), 2007, Dom. Rep.
- Peripecias de un Sueño Enamorado, 2007, Dom. Rep.
- La Canción de Angelina, 2011, Dom. Rep.
