= Juan Esteban Ariza Mendoza =

Dominican diplomat, lawyer (1928–2006)

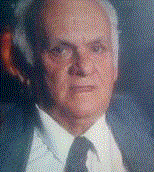
- Dr Juan E Ariza Mendoza III
- Born: Santo Domingo, Dominican Republic
- Died: December 31, 2006 (aged 78)
- Education: Universidad Autónoma de Santo Domingo

Juan Esteban Ariza Mendoza III (24 February 1928 – 31 December 2006) was a Dominican lawyer, diplomat and poet.

== Life ==
He was born in Santo Domingo, Dominican Republic to Adolfo Ariza-Ariza and Concepcion Mendoza. Mendoza graduated from the school "La Normal" in Gazcue and graduated as a lawyer from the Universidad Autónoma de Santo Domingo (UASD). Prior to becoming a lawyer, he was a messenger at Texaco, located at the Parque Independencia. He also served as a diplomat, notary and a lawyer for the C.E.A Consejo Statal del Azucar for 22 years. After his diplomatic assignments, he maintained his "Buffet" lawyer offices located Fabio in Ciudad Nueva.

He wrote extensively about the oppression suffered by Dominican workers and defended the laws and properties of farmers most of the time at no charge, publishing some of his works through local newspapers or contributing to books on the matter.

His father, Adolfo Ariza Ariza, was a well known statesman who later became part of the opposition of the Trujillo regime. Fito Ariza, his father, was jailed and detained several times for publicly denouncing the atrocities committed by the dictatorship.

Mendoza wrote the prologue of the famous Dominican comedy book "Don Cibaito en la Capital" by Domingo Rodriguez Creus, which tells the tale of a Dominican peasant who went from the countryside to the city and the challenges he faced.

=== Personal life ===
Mendoza was rumored to have been married several times. He was married to Rafaela Rodriguez Cabrera who he widowed in 1976. He remarried in 2005 to Milagros Baez. The Arizas publicly demonstrated vast political influence in the US and in the Dominican Republic. Mendoza was a cousin of Porfirio Rubirosa who later became an icon in the Dominican Republic.

Mendoza had 10 children.
