= Tulio Manuel Cestero =

- Born: Tulio Manuel Cestero Leiva; 10 July 1877; San Cristobal, Dominican Republic
- Died: 27 October 1955 (aged 78); Santiago, Chile
- Occupation(s): Poet, novelist, essayist, playwright

Tulio Manuel Cestero Leiva (10 July 1877, in San Cristobal, Dominican Republic – 27 October 1955) was a Dominican poet, novelist, essayist, playwright, politician and diplomat.

== Biography ==
Cestero was born in San Cristobal, Dominican Republic, the son of Mariano Antonio Cestero Aybar and Mercedes Leiva and Puello. He did his first studies at the Colegio San Luis Gonzaga in Santo Domingo, a city where his parents took him to reside during his childhood. During his adolescence he was invlonced in national politics. He was a secretary of the president Horacio Vázquez and associate of President Carlos Morales Languasco, both of whom he accompanied on several of their armed campaigns. During the time period between 1928 and 1938, he represented the country at political conventions, signing international treaties on human rights conferences held in the United States, South America and the Caribbean. He was Minister of Finance of the Dominican Republic in 1933. He also wrote for Dominican newspapers El Teléfono, Listín Diario, La Campaña and El Hogar and for the magazine Letras y Ciencias.

== Literary career ==
Remembered as one of Dominican Republic’s great modernists, his first venture into literature was as an essayist, with work Notas y escorzos (1898), which chronicles the life and work of the most notable members of the modernist literary movement. He also published the poems: Del amor (1901), El jardín de los sueños (1904) y Sangre de primavera (1908) and the play Cythera (1907). However, it is in creative prose where he manages to express his true qualities as a writer, especially in his book Ciudad romántica (1911) and the novel La Sangre (1913). Much of his work is characterized by the severity with which he depicted political and social problems in the Dominican Republic, where he openly denounced many of the crimes committed during the dictatorship of Ulises Heureaux. He died in Santiago, Chile on October 27, 1955.
