= Alfredo Fernández Simó =

Dominican writer & diplomat (1915–1991)

- Born: 19 October 1915; San Francisco de Macoris, Dominican Republic
- Died: 17 July 1991 (aged 75); Santo Domingo, Dominican Republic
- Occupation: Writer

Alfredo Fernández Simó (October 19, 1915 – July 7, 1991) was a Dominican novelist, poet and diplomat.

== Early life ==
Alfredo Fernández Simó was born in San Francisco de Macoris, Dominican Republic, the son of a classical musician Juan Antonio Fernández and Castillo and Beatriz Simó Kinipping Lucila, of Catalan and German descent. He attended elementary and secondary school in his hometown where he completed high school in 1935. Later he entered the University of Santo Domingo to pursue a law degree, but would drop out two years later.

== Career ==
In July 1944 he entered the diplomatic service as a stenographer - typist Dominican Consulate in Curaçao. Between 1944 and 1975 he held the following positions : Aggregate of the Dominican Legation in Haiti (1944-1945), Civil Added in Colombia (1945-1946), Second Secretary of the Dominican Embassy in Colombia (1947), Charge d' Affaires Dominican in Chile (1948), First Secretary of the Dominican Embassy in Rome (1950–51), Honduras (1952-1953), Haiti (1954–55) and Panama (1955-1956), Director of Business in Peru (1956–57), Chargé d'Affaires in Costa Rica (1958-1959), Ambassador Extraordinary and Plenipotentiary to Brazil (1962-63) and Ambassador Extraordinary and Plenipotentiary to Costa Rica (1969-1975). In late 1959, while serving as Chargé d'Affaires in Costa Rica, the Trujillo dictatorship ordered the persecution and murder due to the participation of his cousin José Antonio Fernández Caminero and his brother Abel Fernandez Simó in organizing a resistance movement against Trujillo in the Northeast.

This situation led him to take refuge in the Embassy of Venezuela in Costa Rica, but when he was denied asylum, fled to Colombia and finally to Peru where he remained several years hiding in the Andean forests. He was a pianist and violinist of the Philharmonic francomacorisana Verdi, founded and directed by his father, and amateur painter. He began his literary career in 1931 with the publication of several of his poems in the national press. He collaborated with newspapers The Information, Listin Diario, El Siglo and numerous literary magazines Venezuelan, Peruvian, Mexican and Dominican. Many of his poems and prose writings reflect the experiences of his travels and stays in different South and Central American countries, especially the prints dedicated to Costa Rica, Panama and Peru that depict their contact with nature and with the customs and way of life some of the indigenous tribes who harbored. His poems Rumbo Sleep was awarded in Colombia in 1947. Has authored the Guazábara novel, considered one of the best genre novels Dominican literature.

== Works ==
=== Poetry ===
- Heading dream. Bogotá, Colombia: Bolívar Editor, 1946.
- In the world of monkeys. Santo Domingo: Editorial People, 1987.

=== Costumbrismo ===
- Visions of Peru. Costa Rica: Texts Publishing Ltd., 1970.
- Fronds amazing. Costa Rica: Text Publishing Ltd., 1973.

=== Novels ===
- Guazábara. Lima, Peru: Editorial Boards and Sons, 1958.
