= Marcio Veloz Maggiolo =

Dominican anthropologist and archaeologist (1936–2021)

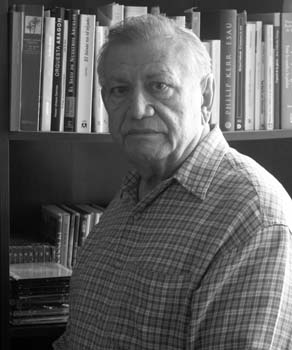
- Born: 13 August 1936; Santo Domingo, Dominican Republic
- Died: 10 April 2021 (aged 84); Santo Domingo, Dominican Republic
- Spouses: Antonia Ruiz Oleaga; Elba Joa; Norma Indiana Santana Geraldino (m. 1966; died 2016)
- Children: 9 children: 3 from his first marriage, 1 from his second marriage, 5 from his third marriage

Marcio Veloz Maggiolo (13 August 1936 – 10 April 2021) was a Dominican writer, archaeologist and anthropologist.

== Biography ==
Veloz Maggiolo attended the Escuela México, the Liceo Presidente Trujillo high school and the Escuela Hostos and studied philosophy and literature at the Universidad Autónoma de Santo Domingo from 1957 to 1962. In 1970 he received his doctorate in American history from the University of Madrid. He also studied journalism in Quito.

He was Deputy Secretary of State for Culture, Director of the Research Department of the Museo del Hombre Dominicano, Director of the Department of Anthropology and History and Founding Director of the Department of Extensión Cultural at the Universidad Autónoma de Santo Domingo and Director of the Museo de las Casas Reales. As ambassador of the Dominican Republic, he worked in Mexico (1965-66), Peru (1982-83) and Rome (1963-64 and 1983-85). He was a member of the Academia Dominicana de la Lengua and a corresponding member of the Academia Dominicana de Geografía, as well as a member of the American Anthropological Association and the Historical Society of Trinidad and Tobago.

Veloz Maggiolo was a prolific writer, emerging as a poet, storyteller, novelist and playwright. He has received numerous awards, including the Premio Nacional de Novela three times (1962, 1981 and 1990) and the Premio Nacional de Literatura (1996). Some of his narrative and essay work has been translated into English, Italian, French and German. With De dónde vino la gente (1978) he was the first Dominican writer to publish a novel for children. He returned to children's literature with the novel El Jefe iba descalzo (1993) and the short stories La verdadera historia de Aladino (2007) and La iguanita azul (2012). As an essayist, Veloz Maggiolo has written on subjects such as Dominican and Caribbean culture, literature and history, linguistics, politics, archaeology, anthropology, science and the environment. His maternal great-great-grandfather, Juan Bautista Maggiolo, was a Genovese naval captain who co-founded the Navy of the Dominican Republic with the also Genovese-born Juan Bautista Cambiaso and the Dominican Juan Alejandro Acosta.

He died on April 10, 2021, several weeks after admission to the intensive care area of the Center for Diagnostics, Advanced Medicine and Telemedicine (CEDIMAT), Santo Domingo, after being diagnosed with COVID-19 during the COVID-19 pandemic in the Dominican Republic.

Ancestors of Marcio Veloz Maggiolo

16. Lorenzo Veloz González (1798–1876); Santo Domingo
8. Nicasio Veloz Delgado (1823–1911); Santo Domingo
17. Florencia Delgado de Rojas (1799–1863); Santo Domingo
4. Juan Pablo Veloz Victorino (1865–?)
18. Víctor Victorino
9. María Concepción Victorino Villegas
19. Carmen Villegas
2. Francisco Javier Veloz Molina
20. Domingo Molina (1803–1878); Santo Domingo
10. Nicolás Molina Moreira (1843–?); Santo Domingo
21. Magdalena Moreira
5. Adela Molina Echavarría (1866–?); Santo Domingo, Dominican Republic
22. Manuel Felipe Echavarría Núñez (1801–?); Santo Domingo
11. María Clara Echavarría del Castillo (1828–?); Santo Domingo
23. Bernardita del Castillo
1. Marcio Veloz Maggiolo (1936-2021); Santo Domingo, Dominican Republic
24. Juan Bautista Maggiolo; (né Giovanni Battista Maggiolo)
12. Bartolomeo Maggiolo Pellerano (1825–?); Genoa, Piedmont-Sardinia
25. Rosa Pellerano Costa (1808–?); Santa Margherita Ligure, Gênes, Napoleonic France
6. Manuel Américo Maggiolo Ravelo
26. Tomás Ravelo Mota (1797–1884)
13. Carmen Ravelo de los Santos
27. María Salomé de los Santos y Fajardo
3. Mercedes Rosa 'Chea' Maggiolo Núñez (circa 1910–?)
14. Alonso Núñez González
7. María Rafaela Hipólita Núñez Cabral (1867–?); Santo Domingo
30. Juan Marcos Cabral y Aybar (1792–1853); Hincha, Captaincy General of Santo Domingo
15. Julia Cabral y Luna (1816–?); Ingenio Nuevo, San Cristóbal, Captaincy General of Santo Domingo
31. María Ramona de Luna y Andújar (1787–1877); Hincha, Captaincy General of Santo Domingo

Sources:
- Edwin R. Espinal, fellow of the Dominican Institute of Genealogy
- Fr. Cipriano de Utrera, O.F.M. Cap., fellow of the Dominican Academy of History
