= León Félix Batista =

Dominican Republic writer

León Félix Batista (born 1964) Dominican author and poet. On September 11, 2003, he conducted an atentado poético ("poetic attack") in New York City in remembrance of the WTC attacks by flying a plane over New York He represented the Dominican Republic at the Latin American Book Fair in December 2008 in Rome, Italy.
