= Rosa Silverio =

Dominican poet, writer and journalist

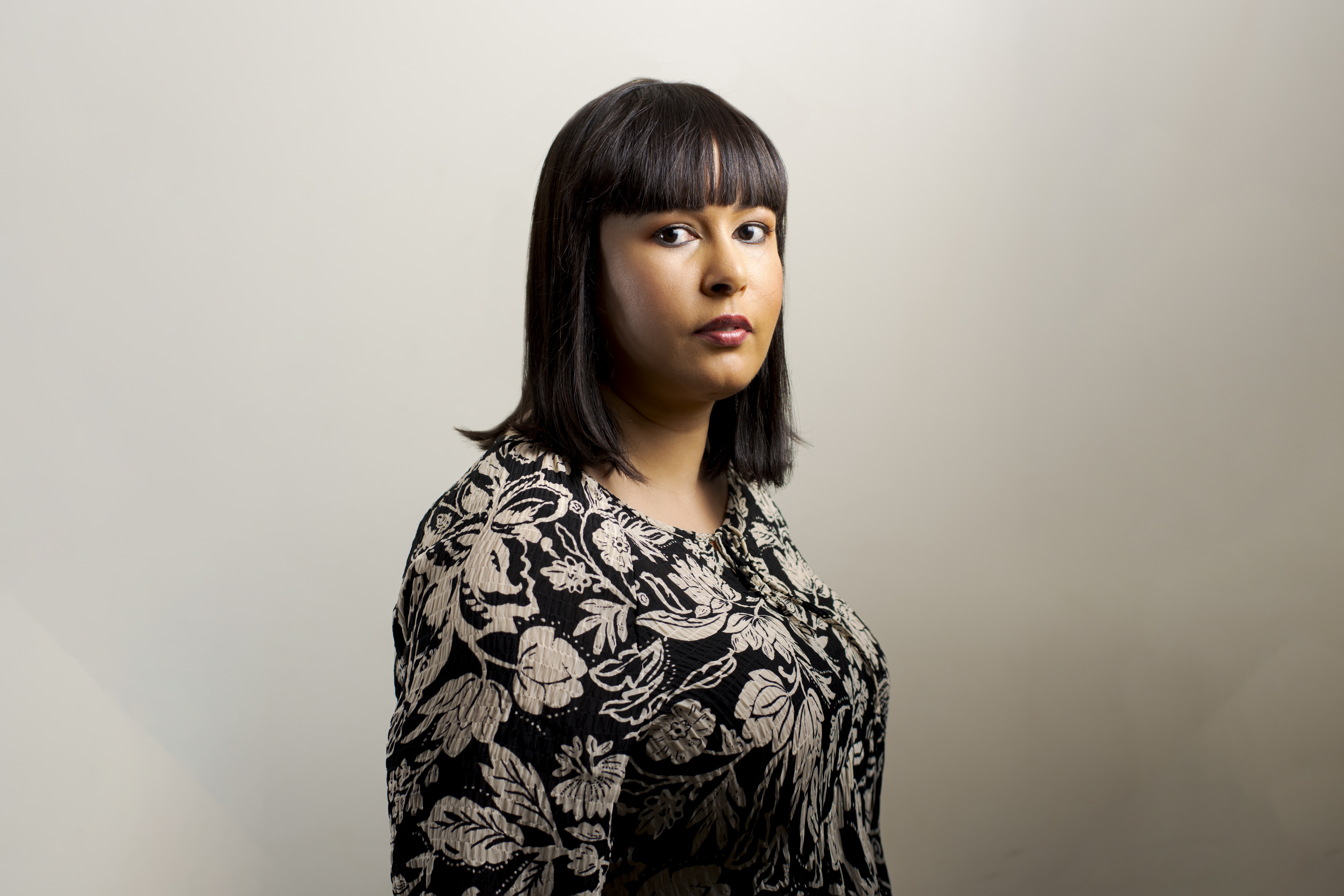
- Born: Rosa Silverio; 30 August 1978 (age 47); Santiago de los Caballeros, Dominican Republic
- Occupation: Writer

Rosa Silverio, in full Rosa de Jesús Silverio Filpo (born in Santiago de los Caballeros, Dominican Republic on August 30, 1978), is a Dominican poet and storyteller.

== Biography ==
Silverio was born on August 30, 1978, and currently resides in Madrid, Spain. She is a poet, journalist, writer and cultural activist. Silverio's stories and poems have been published in magazines, literary supplements, and anthologies of various countries. Her literary works have been translated into languages such as English, French, Italian, Portuguese and Catalan.

== Works ==
- 2005 – Desnuda, poesía. Editora Cole. Santo Domingo, R.D.
- 2002 – De vuelta a casa, poesía. Editora Centenario. Santo Domingo, R.D.
- 2007 – Rosa íntima, poesía. Editorial Santuario.
- 2010 – Selección poética, poesía.
- 2012 – Arma letal. La destrucción de las palabras.Ganador Premio Nacional de Poesía 2011 de la República Dominicana
- 2012 – A los delincuentes hay que matarlos. Prisa Ediciones.
- 2014 – Matar al Padre, poesía. Huerga y Fierro Editores
- 2016 – Mujer de lámpara encendida, poesía. Huerga y Fierro Editores.

== Awards ==
- 2011 – Premio Nacional Salomé Ureña, Santo Domingo, República Dominicana.
- 2005 – Vencedora Absoluta del XXI Premio Internacional Nosside de Poesía que organiza el Centro de Estudios Bosio de Regio de Calabria (Italia).
- 2003 – Primer lugar en el concurso de cuento, poesía y ensayo que organiza la Alianza Cibaeña por su relato “La canción rota”.
- 2001 – Mención por el cuento “La mueca” en el concurso de cuentos de Radio Santa María.
- 1999 Tercer lugar en el concurso de cuento Colorín Colorado por su relato “La caja donde Alicia guarda sus secretos”.
- 1999 – Mención especial por su cuento “Niki” en el concurso de cuento, poesía y ensayo de la Alianza Cibaeña.
- 1998 – Primer lugar en el concurso Terminemos el cuento por terminar el relato “Más triste que su canto” del reconocido autor dominicano Andrés L. Mateo. Certamen organizado por el periódico Listín Diario, Unión Latina y el Centro Cultural de España.
- 1997 – Mención especial por el cuento “El ave que no podía volar” en el concurso de cuento, poesía y ensayo de la Alianza Cibaeña.
