= Miguel D. Mena =

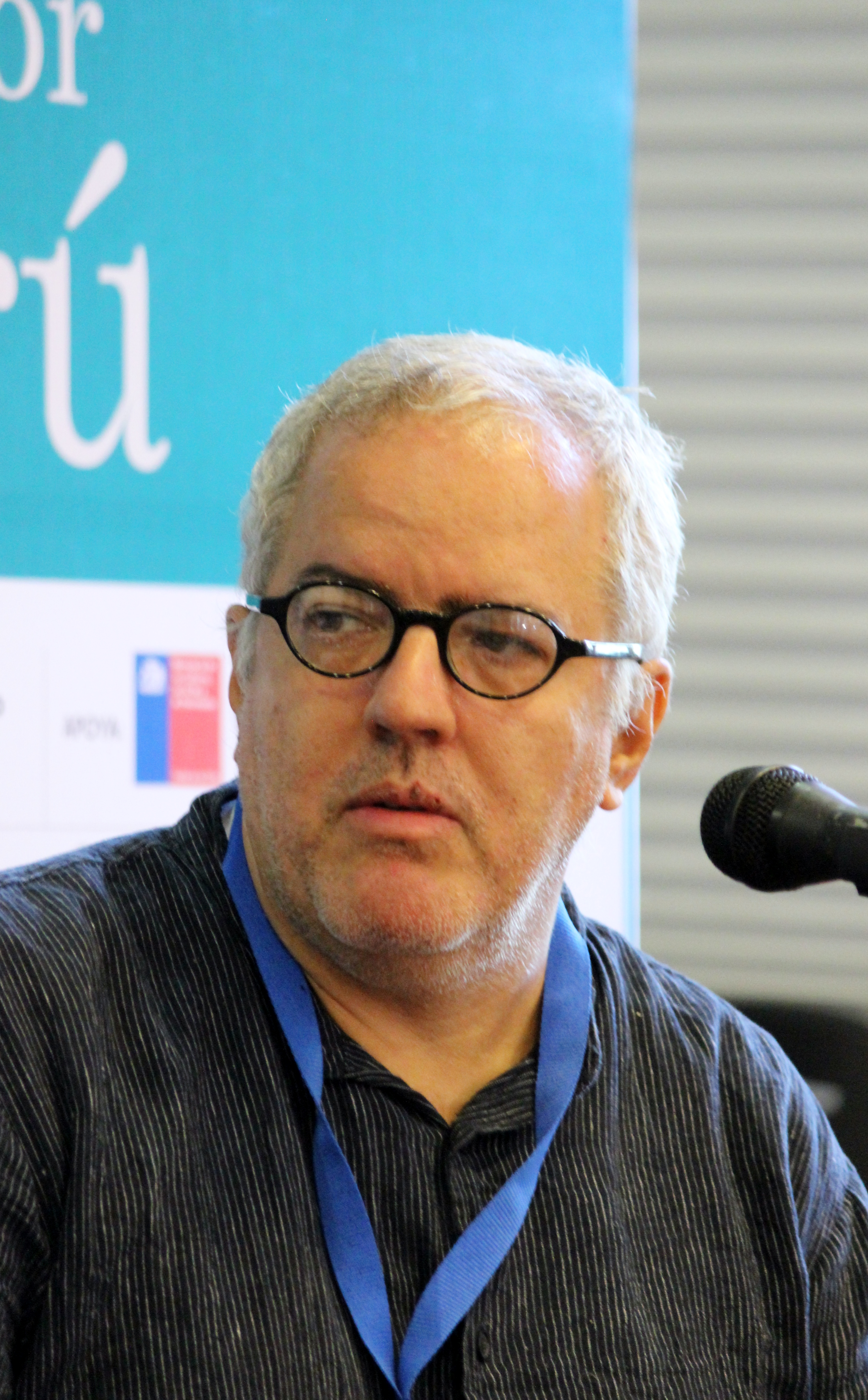
- Born: July 21, 1961; Santo Domingo, Dominican Republic
- Citizenship: Dominican
- Occupation: Writer • Esseyist • Publisher
- Parent(s): Manuel Mena, Gabina Alcántara

Miguel D. Mena (Santo Domingo, Dominican Republic, 1961) is a Dominican writer, poet, essayist and publisher.

== Early life and studies ==
He studied sociology in the Autonomous University of Santo Domingo, where he graduated in 1986 with the thesis Ciudad, espacio y poder en Republica Dominicanca (City, space and power in Dominican Republic). He continued his research on the city of Santo Domingo in Germany, where he has been living since 1990. His PhD from the Free University of Berlin has been recently published under the title: Iglesia, Espacio y Poder: Santo Domingo (1498–1521) Experiencia Fundacional del Nuevo Mundo (Church, Space and Power: Santo Domingo (1498–1521)).

== Published articles ==
He has also written a collection of essays about the urban question in the Dominican Republic (Poetica de Santo Domingo Vol. 1, 2 and 3) and hundreds of articles for newspapers and magazines about contemporary aspects of the Dominican capital. He has also written extensively about Dominican literature and especially about Vanguardism in the Dominican literature. He has been one of the leading figures in independent publishing since the mid-1980s in Dominican Republic. He is now at the head of “Cielonaranja Ediciones”.

== Bibliography ==
=== Poetry ===
- 1985: Almario Urbano. Ediciones Huellas, Santo Domingo.
- 1985: Imagen es. Ediciones de la Crisis, Santo Domingo.

=== Essays ===
- 1989: Para una escritura de la crisis dominicana. Ediciones en el Jardín de las Delicias, Berlín-Santo Domingo.
- 1997: René del Risco, lo dominicano, la modernidad. Ediciones en el Jardín de las Delicias, Santo Domingo – Berlín.
- 1997: El libro de las Vainas. Ediciones en el Jardín de las Delicias, Santo Domingo – Berlín.
- 1999: Juan Sánchez Lamouth, en el cabaret de los crueles. Ediciones en el Jardín de las Delicias, Santo Domingo – Berlín.
- 2000: Poética de Santo Domingo (t. I). Ediciones en el Jardín de las Delicias, Santo Domingo – Berlín.
- 2002: Yo sé que los choferes la van an escuchar. Ediciones Cielonaranja, Berlín.
- 2003: Devenir moderno. Poética de Santo Domingo II. Ediciones Cielonaranja, Berlín.
- 2006: Imagen, espacio: Isla Dominicana. (Poética de Santo Domingo III). Ediciones Cielonaranja, Berlín.
- 2006: Diccionario de las Letras Dominicanas. (Poética de Santo Domingo III). Ediciones Cielonaranja, Berlín.
- 2007: Santo Domingo (1498–1521): Experiencia fundacional del Nuevo Mundo. Archivo General de la Nación, volumen XXX, Santo Domingo.

=== Anthologies and Recompilations ===
- 1985: Reunión de Poesía, Poetas de la Crisis. Ediciones de la crisis, Santo Domingo.
- 1985: Juan Sánchez Lamouth, Poesía escogida. Ediciones de la crisis, Santo Domingo.
- 1997-2006: Obra Completa de René del Risco, tres tomos:
  - 1)Cuentos Completos. Ediciones Manatí, Santo Domingo.
  - 2)Poesía Completa
  - 3)El cumpleaños de Porfirio Chavez (novela).
- 2000: Erwin Walter Palm: Santo Domingo: Arte y Arquitectura Colonial. Ediciones en el Jardín de las Delicias, Santo Domingo.
- 2001: Santo Domingo: Su poesía. Primera Antología de Poesía Urbana de la Capital Dominicana. Ediciones Cielonaranja, Santo Domingo – Berlín.
- 2002: La Ciudad Colonial del Nuevo Mundo, formas y sentido. Ediciones en el Jardín de las Delicias, Santo Domingo.
- 2004: "Los años de la arcilla. Haceres literarios de Efraím Castillo. Ediciones Cielonaranja, Santo Domingo - Berlín.
- 2006: René del Risco, así tan sencillamente. Ediciones del Cielonaranja, Santo Domingo – Berlín.
- 2006: Santo Domingo: Su poesía. Antología de la poesía urbana de Santo Domingo. Ediciones Cielonaranja, Santo Domingo – Berlín.
- 2006: Poesía de la Calle El Conde. Ediciones Cielonaranja, Santo Domingo – Berlín.
- 2006: Poesía de la Calle El Conde (segundo piso). Ediciones Cielonaranja, Santo Domingo – Berlín.
- 2010-2016: Archivos de Pedro Henríquez Ureña. Ediciones Cielonaranja, Santo Domingo – Berlín.
- 2014: Pedro Henríquez Ureña: Obras Completas (1-7). Editora Nacional, Ministerio de Cultura, Santo Domingo.
- 2015: Pedro Henríquez Ureña: Obras Completas (8-14). Editora Nacional, Ministerio de Cultura, Santo Domingo.
- 2006: Jorge Mañach: Ensayos de Cubanidad. Ediciones Cielonaranja, Santo Domingo.
