= Pedro Francisco Bonó =

Dominican politician, sociologist and intellectual (1828–1906)

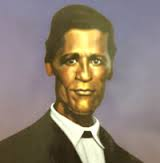
- Portrait of Pedro Francisco Bonó
- Born: Pedro Francisco Bonó y Mejía; 18 October 1828; Saint-Yague, Haiti (now Santiago, Dominican Republic)
- Died: 14 September 1906 (aged 77); San Francisco de Macorís, Dominican Republic
- Resting place: National Pantheon of the Dominican Republic

Pedro Francisco Bonó y Mejía (October 18, 1828 – September 13, 1906) was a Dominican politician, sociologist and intellectual. He is credited with being the first Dominican sociologist. He was the president of the Senate of the Dominican Republic in 1858.

Bonó was born in 1828, to Joseph Bonó (a ranchman and trader of Italian origin) and Inés Mejía y Port. His maternal grandmother, Doña Eugénie Port, a native of Brittany (North-Western France) who had large plantations and fortune in the Saint-Domingue until the outbreak of the Haitian Revolution, taught him the French language and fashioned him intellectually.

A metro station in Santo Domingo is named after him.

== Publications ==
- El Montero (1856)
- Apuntes para los Cuatro Ministerios de la República (1857)
- Apuntes sobre las Clases Trabajadoras Dominicanas (1881)
- Congreso Extraparlamentario (1895)
- Epistolario
- Ensayos Sociohistóricos
- Actuación Pública
- Papeles de Pedro Francisco Bonó (Works collected by Emilio Rodríguez Demorizi, 1963)
