= Manuel de Jesús Galván =

Dominican politician, diplomat, lawyer and academic

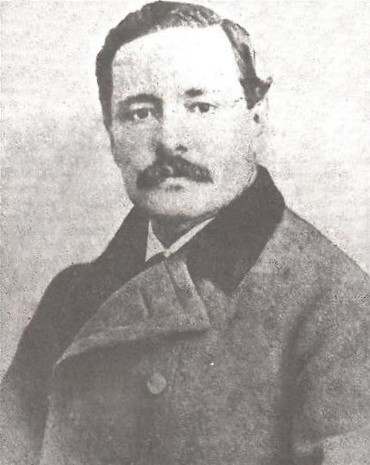
- Born: 13 January 1834; Santo Domingo, Republic of Haiti
- Died: 13 December 1910 (aged 76); San Juan, Puerto Rico
- Resting place: Basilica Cathedral of Santa María la Menor, Santo Domingo, Dominican Republic
- Occupations: Writer, lawyer, diplomat, politician, journalist, academic
- Writing career
- Language: Spanish
- Genres: Historical novel, political writing
- Notable work: Enriquillo

Manuel de Jesús Galván (13 January 1834 – 13 December 1910) was a Dominican Republic politician, diplomat, lawyer and academic who between the 1860s and the 1900s occupied many of the highest posts in his country's government and judicature, including Minister of Public Works, Foreign Minister, President of the Supreme Court, and Minister to the United States. He was also a journalist and political writer. His only novel, Enriquillo (1879, 1882; translated as The Cross and the Sword, 1954), which tells the story of a native rebellion in the early days of the Spanish occupation of Hispaniola, holds a high place in 19th-century Latin American literature.

== Childhood ==
Manuel de Jesús Galván was born in 1834 in the city of Santo Domingo, at a time when the whole island of Hispaniola was under the control of the Republic of Haiti. In 1844, when he was 10, the Spanish-speaking part of the island rose up and declared its independence under the name of the Dominican Republic, remaining at war with Haiti for many years. Little is known of Galván's childhood and youth in these turbulent times except that it was then that his interest in literature and the law became clear.

== Public life ==
In 1854 he founded an organization named Amantes de las Letras (or "Friends of Literature") together with a related periodical, El Oasis, in which he wrote articles of a conservative tendency praising the culture of Spain and attacking Haiti. At this time he began his climb through the Dominican hierarchy with the help of well-placed connections. In 1859 he was appointed secretary, first to a diplomatic mission to Denmark, and then to General Pedro Santana, President of the Republic. Other posts he held during these years include Secretary of the Senate, Master-General of the Post Office, Minister of Public Works, and editor of the government periodical La Gazeta. When Santana effected the reannexation of the Dominican Republic to Spain as a way of countering the Haitian threat, Galván founded another journal, La Razón, and supported Santana's policy in it. Spanish rule only lasted a few years, and in 1865 the Dominican Restoration War ended with the Republic being reinstated. Galván moved to Puerto Rico, then still a Spanish possession, where he became Comptroller of Finances and wrote for the journals Boletín Mercantil, El Buscapié and La Democracia.

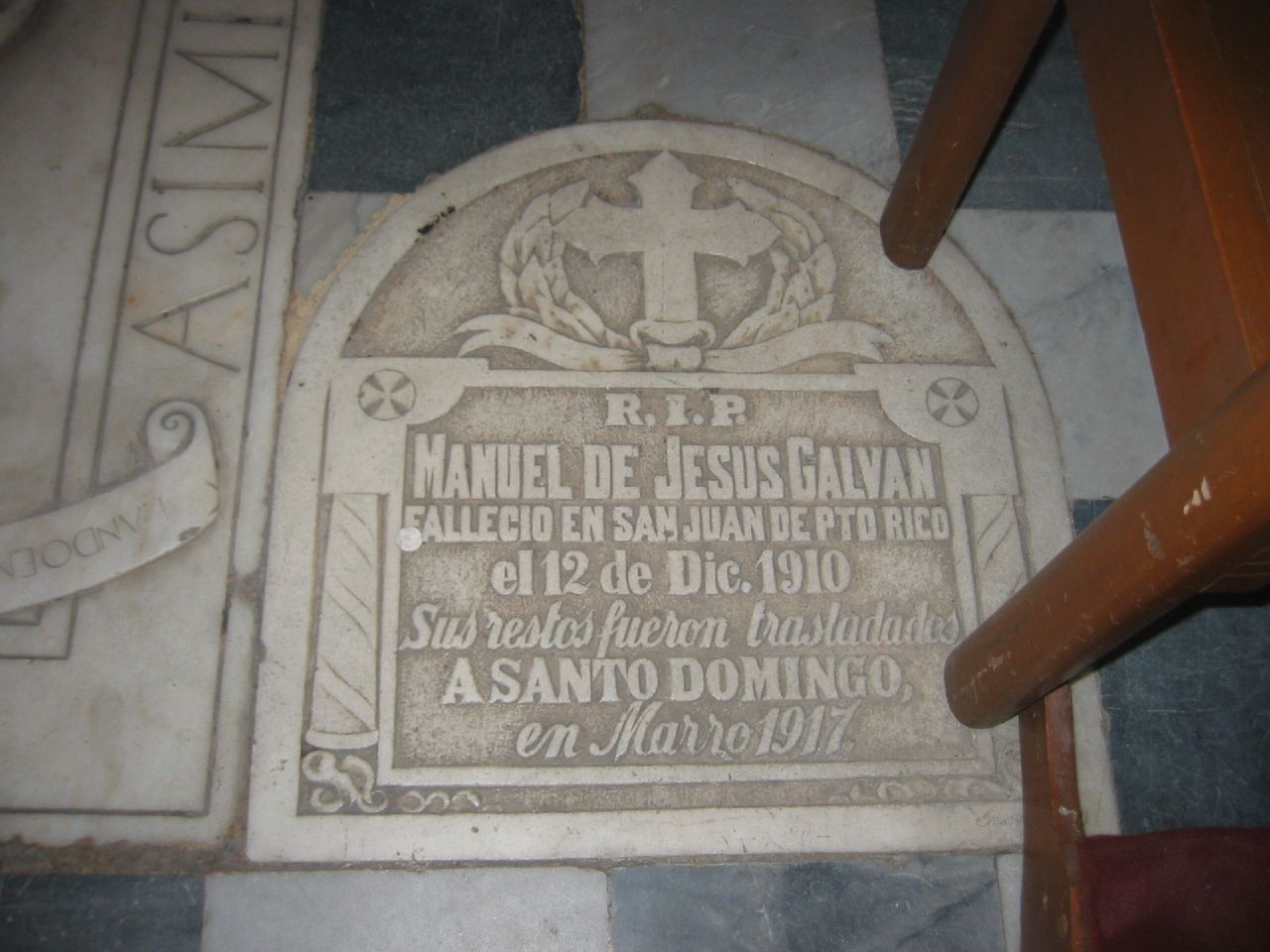
Galván's tomb in the Basilica Cathedral of Santa María la Menor, Santo Domingo

He was made Spanish Consul to Puerto Principe in the Dominican Republic, then, having become an associate of the liberal politician Ulises Francisco Espaillat, was given the post of Foreign Minister when Espaillat gained the presidency. He also headed the Supreme Court from 1883 to 1889, was named as Minister to the United States in 1891, and as Foreign Minister again in 1893. He worked at the Derecho de Instituto Profesional from 1896 to 1902, teaching law. His fourth term as Foreign Minister, beginning in 1903, was his last public office. In 1910 he died in Puerto Rico, and seven years later his remains were returned to the Dominican Republic.

== Enriquillo ==
Though Galván wrote several monographs on political and diplomatic questions, his literary reputation now rests entirely on his only novel, Enriquillo. The action takes place in Hispaniola between the years 1503 and 1533. The title character, a Taíno cacique, is brought up as a Christian during the first years of the Spanish occupation. He is given a good education and engaged to another high-ranking Taíno, Mencía, but suffers many indignities and is cheated out of his inheritance. Finding no satisfaction in the law courts, he raises a rebellion and establishes a separate Taíno principality which successfully repels all Spanish attacks for several years. Eventually, through the advocacy of Bartolomé de las Casas at the Spanish court, Charles V recognises the independence of Enriquillo's state, and he is allowed to live his last years in peace.

The first volume was published in 1879, and the complete novel in 1882. Its historical details are in part derived from the works of Bartolomé de las Casas, Juan de Castellanos, and Fernández de Oviedo; it also, according to Robert Graves, shows the literary influence of Charles Reade's The Cloister and the Hearth. The novel can be seen as a vindication of his early support for reannexation by Spain, an assertion that the power of the Spanish crown could be invoked as a safeguard of Dominican liberty. It also reflects Galván's sympathy with the plight of the Taíno, but his respect for historical authenticity prevented him from picturing them in an overly idealised, Rousseauesque manner, as was fashionable at the time. The simplicity of the novel's prose style and purity of its language have been widely praised. It is considered one of the best Latin American historical novels, and it singlehandedly put Galván among the foremost Spanish American novelists of his time.

An English version of Enriquillo was published under the title The Cross and the Sword, ostensibly translated by Robert Graves though in fact it was largely the work of his second wife, Beryl, with some polishing of the prose by Graves.
