= Domingo Moreno Jimenes =

Domingo Segundo Moreno Jimenes (7 January 1894 in Santo Domingo – 23 September 1986 in Santo Domingo) was a writer from the Dominican Republic; the founder and leader of the Posthumism, a Dominican literary movement.

Moreno Jimenes was the only-child of the goldsmith Domingo Moreno Arriaga, and his wife María Josefa Jimenes Hernández. He was christened on 4 August 1894. He was the great-grandson and grandson of Presidents Manuel Jimenes and Juan Isidro Jimenes, respectively; the lawyer Guillermo Moreno García is his grandson. He married Emelinda Espinal López.
