= Sócrates Nolasco =

Writer from the Dominican Republic (1884–1980)

Arístides Sócrates Henríquez Nolasco was a writer from the Dominican Republic.

== Biography ==
He was born in what is now Enriquillo in Barahona Province on 20 March 1884, and died in Santo Domingo on 2 July 1980. The parents of Sócrates Nolasco (he preferred to use his mother's surname instead of Henriquez, his paternal family name) were Juliana Nolasco and Manuel Henríquez y Carvajal.

He married his first cousin Flérida María Lamarche Henríquez (1891–1976), a pianist, historian, writer and teacher; they both were niblings of Francisco and Federico Henríquez y Carvajal, and cousins of Max, Camila and Pedro Henríquez Ureña, and had Sephardic Dutch-Jewish descent.

Some of his formative years, from 1906 to 1913, were spent in Cuba, in the city of Santiago de Cuba, and he later returned to that nearby country, to Havana, living there from 1951 to 1954.

Nolasco was a relatively prolific writer, and helped develop a body of work related to the Dominican Republic. His works have been compiled into three volumes, dealing with his stories, historical essays, and literary essays.
