= Ureña =

Ureña or Urena may refer to:

- Urena, a genus of plants
  - Urena lobata
- Ureña, Táchira, a community in Táchira State, Venezuela
- Ureña SC, a football club in the Venezuelan Primera División, based in Ureña, Táchira
- Count of Ureña, a Spanish noble title

== Surname ==
- Camila Henríquez Ureña (1894–1973), Dominican writer, daughter of Salomé Ureña
- Francisco Urena, American politician
- Gerardo Ureña (born 1955), Costa Rican footballer and manager
- Jorge Ureña (born 1993), Spanish athlete
- José Rafael Molina Ureña (1921–2000), Dominican politician
- José Ureña (born 1991), Dominican baseball player
- Juan Antonio Ureña (born 1967), Spanish footballer
- Julian Scott Urena, Dominican actor
- Leopoldo Alas y Ureña (1852–1901), Spanish novelist
- Marco Ureña (born 1990), Costa Rican footballer
- Pedro Henríquez Ureña (1884–1946), Dominican writer
- Rafael Estrella Ureña (1889–1945), Dominican politician and lawyer
- Richard Ureña (born 1996), Dominican baseball player
- Rodrigo Ureña (born 1993), Chilean footballer
- Salomé Ureña (1850–1897), Dominican writer
- Walbert Ureña (born 2004), Dominican baseball player
