= Flérida de Nolasco =

Dominican teacher and scholar (1891–1976)

Flérida Lamarche de Nolasco (née Lamarche Henríquez; born February 27, 1891– February 12, 1976) was a scholar and literary critic, renowned pianist, historian, and teacher from the Dominican Republic. She was a Professor of Folklore, Dominican literature and the History of Music at the Universidad Autónoma de Santo Domingo, and was also noted for her musical ability.

Her father, Manuel Lamarche, was of French descent, and her mother, Clotilde Henríquez y Carvajal, had Sephardic Dutch-Jewish ancestry. She married her cousin Sócrates Nolasco.

She and her husband were niblings of Francisco and Federico Henríquez y Carvajal, and cousins of Max, Camila and Pedro Henríquez Ureña.

== Works ==
- Cultura Musical, 1927
- De música española y otros temas, 1939
- La música en Santo Domingo y otros Ensayos, 1939
- La Poesía Folklórica en Santo Domingo, 1946
- Existencia y Vicisitudes del Colegio Gorjón, 1947
- Cuadros del Evangelio, 1947
- Vibraciones en el Tiempo, 1948, 1972
- Días de la Colonia, 1952
- Rutas de Nuestra Poesía, 1952
- Santo Domingo en el Folklore Universal, 1957
- Grandes Momentos de la Historia de la Música, 1957
- Santa Teresa de Jesús a través de sus Obras, 1959
- El primer santuario de América, 1961
- Pedro Henríquez Ureña, Síntesis de su pensamiento, 1966
- Clamor de Justicia en la Española, 1502-1795, 1971
- Luminarias en Vela, 1972
- Mi Testimonio, 1975
