= History of the Jews in the Dominican Republic =

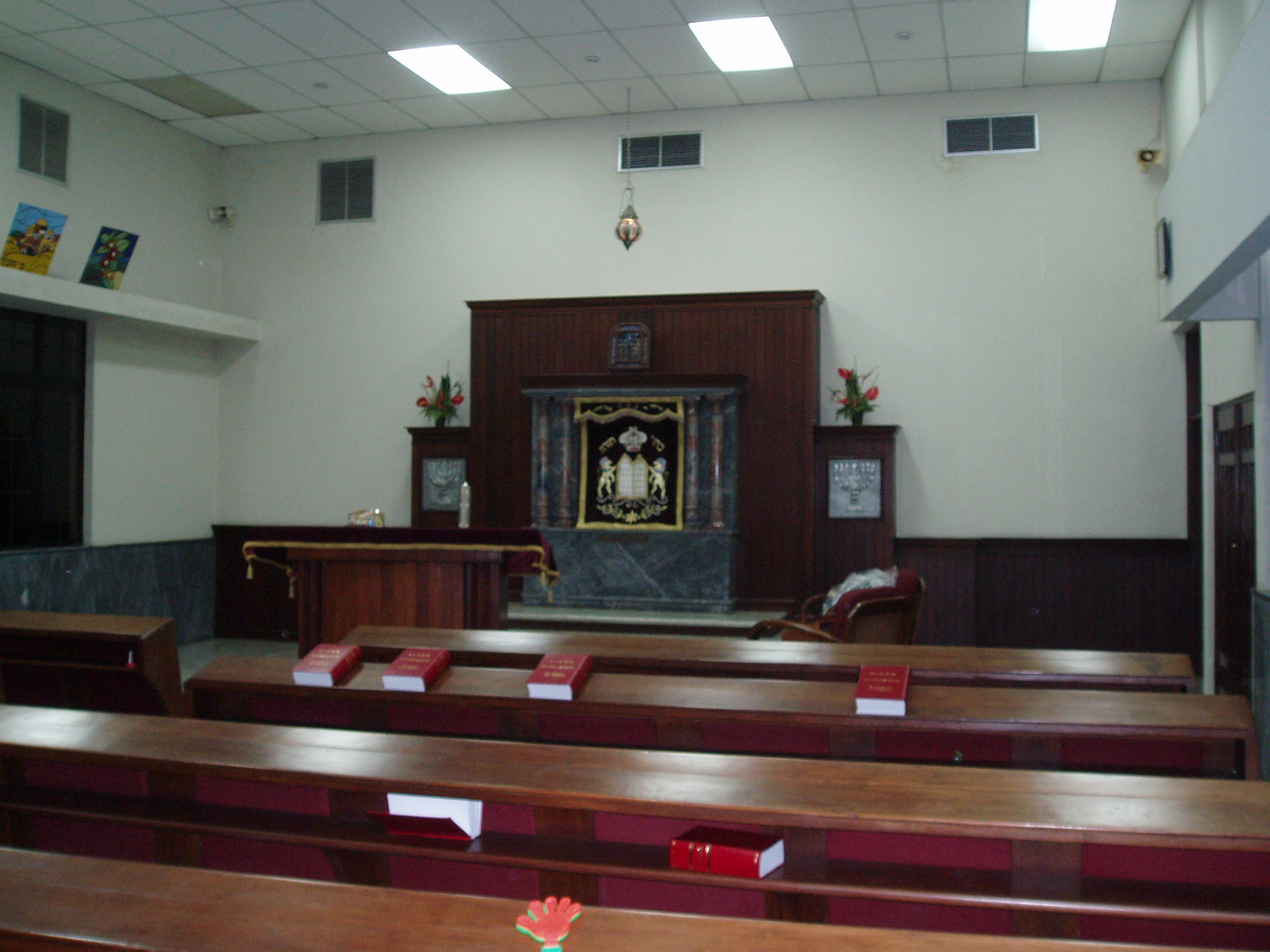
Inside a Santo Domingo synagogue

The history of the Jews in the Dominican Republic goes back to the late 1400s, with the arrival of Sephardic Jews exiled from Spain and the Mediterranean area in 1492 and 1497. This was followed by new waves of migrants dating from the 1700s and again in the period before and during World War II, reaching a peak in the late 1930s and early 1940s, as Jewish refugees fled the conditions in Europe brought on by WWII.

== History ==
The first Jews known to have reached the island of Hispaniola were Sephardic Jews who came from the Iberian Peninsula in the 1490s. The majority of them were fleeing from Spain, where conversion to Catholicism was being enforced.

Despite this, when the island was divided by the French and Spanish Empires in the 17th century, most Jews settled on the Spanish side which would later become the Dominican Republic. Eventually, Sephardim from other countries also arrived. Most of them hid their Jewish identities or were unaffiliated with Jewish tradition by that time. Among their descendants were Dominican President Francisco Henríquez y Carvajal and his issue Pedro Henríquez Ureña, Max Henríquez Ureña, and Camila Henríquez Ureña.

Before the Jews migrated and established the colony of Sosúa during WWII, there was an attempt to make a Jewish colony in the Dominican Republic in the late 19th century. This settlement was not as well documented as the one created in the 1940s. General Gregorio Luperón, who had served as President of the Dominican Republic and was living in exile in Paris in 1882, proposed the country as a refuge for Jews escaping pogroms in Russia. Luperón's motivations for proposing this plan seem to have stemmed from a combination of humanitarian concern and a desire to promote the economic development of the Dominican Republic. He believed that the Jewish refugees, with their skills and work ethic, could contribute to the prosperity of the country. Luperón initiated contact with several key figures and organizations in the Jewish world in order to circulate the idea. These figures included Alliance Israélite Universelle, The prominent Rothschild banking family, and the Jewish community in the United States, particularly in New York. While many Dominicans and Jews living in the Dominican Republic were already in favor of the idea, others opposed the plan. Others raised practical concerns about the plan, particularly the need for financial support, land allocation, and employment opportunities for potential settlers. It appears that a commission of Dominican landowners was formed to investigate the feasibility of the plan but that no concrete action was ultimately taken. While Luperón's plan for a Jewish colony in the Dominican Republic in the 1880s ultimately failed to materialize, it demonstrates the Dominican Republic's recurring role as a potential haven for Jewish refugees during times of crisis.

The Dominican Republic was the only sovereign country willing to accept mass Jewish immigration immediately prior and during World War II, the only alternative being the Shanghai International Settlement. The United States government had attempted to also set up a Jewish colony in Alaska in order to populate the area. However, what would become known as The Alaska Plan, was effectively buried due to a lack of support and opposition from antisemitic and nativist groups. In turn, support for the Jews fell almost solely on the Dominican Republic. At the Évian Conference, convened to address the Jewish refugee crisis, the Dominican Republic, under the rule of dictator Rafael Trujillo, offered to accept 100,000 Jewish refugees. However, it is estimated that 5,000 visas were actually issued, and the vast majority of the recipients did not reach the country because of how hard it was to get out of occupied Europe. Trujillo then offered his personal estate in Sosúa to the Dominican Republic Settlement Association (DORSA), established by the American Jewish Joint Distribution Committee (JDC) to manage the resettlement project. In return for his land, Trujillo received $100,000 in DORSA stock. By February of 1940, DORSA had managed to get congressional approval for the settlement in Sosua and the plan began to move forward. By Spring of that year, the colony began receiving its first settlers. About 700 European Jews of Ashkenazi Jewish descent reached the settlement where each family received 33 hectares (82 acres) of land, 10 cows (plus 2 additional cows per child), a mule and a horse, and a US$10,000 loan (about 219,000 dollars at 2025 prices) at 1% interest. The colonists were expected to engage in communal agriculture, sharing work and profits equally. Dairying and poultry raising were also intended as complementary activities. However, crop-based agriculture proved largely unsuccessful due to poor soil, unpredictable rainfall, and limited market access.Due to the challenges of communal agriculture, the colony transitioned to a capitalist model by 1945, with individual families receiving their own farms. The only exception to this individualistic approach was the dairy and meat factories, which were run as cooperatives with profits divided according to investment. Those who did not travel to Sosúa usually settled in the capital, Santo Domingo. In 1943 the number of known Jews in the Dominican Republic peaked at 1000.

At the conclusion of WWII, The Jewish population in Sosúa gradually declined as residents relocated, mostly to the United States. As a portion of the Jewish population left, Dominican residents began to move in Sosúa. Throughout the majority of the 20th century, Sosúa existed as a mixed community of Jewish and Dominican residents, with the Jewish population aging and shrinking. The Dominican influence, both economic and cultural, becomes increasingly prominent. This peaked in 1980 when Sosúa's Jewish community experienced a deep decline due to emigration during the touristic boom of Sosúa when most Jews sold their land to developers.

== Community ==
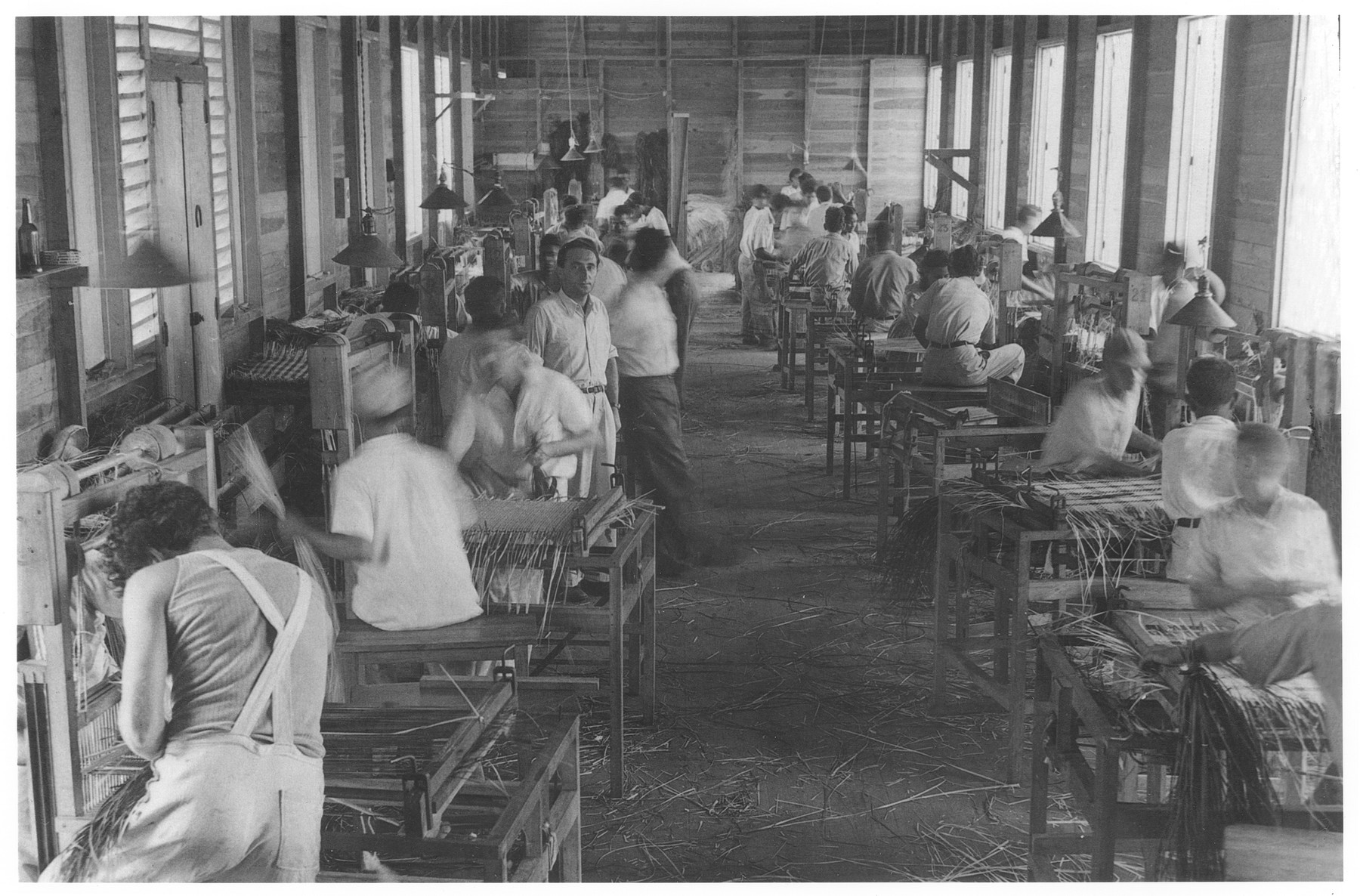
Jewish refugees in Sosúa work in a factory making handbags for export to the United States in the 1940s.

The current population of known Jews in the Dominican Republic is close to 3,000, with the majority living in the capital, Santo Domingo, and others residing in Sosúa. However, while the Jewish community in Sosúa still exists, it has shrunk considerably. Many of the original settlers have died or emigrated, and their children often choose not to return. The community retains some of its unique character, with a mix of languages and cultural traditions, but the future of the Jewish community in Sosúa remains uncertain.Since Jews mixed with those already living in the Dominican Republic, the exact number of Dominicans with Jewish ancestry isn't known. In spite of the Jews intermarriage with the Dominican people already living there, some spouses have formalized their Judaism through conversions and participate in Jewish communal life while other Sephardic Jews converted to Catholicism, still maintaining their Sephardic culture. Some Dominican Jews have also made aliyah to Israel. There are three synagogues and one Sephardic Jewish Educational Center. One is the Centro Israelita de República Dominicana in Santo Domingo, another is a Chabad outreach center also in Santo Domingo, and another is in the country's first established community in Sosúa. Beth Midrash Eleazar , the Sephardic Educational Center, caters to those Jews who are descendants of the Sephardic Jews that migrated to Hispaniola in colonial times and later. In addition, they also provide kosher meat in the Beth Yoseph style, and supervise a small-scale kosher bakery. An "afterschool" at the Centro Israelita is active on a weekly basis and a chapter of the International Council of Jewish Women is also active. The Chabad outreach center focuses on assisting the local Jewish population reconnect with their Jewish roots and (because Chabad is of the Chassidic Jewish tradition) it is a source for traditional Judaism in the Dominican Republic. In Sosua, there is a small Jewish Museum next to the synagogue. On the High Holidays, the Sosúa community hires a cantor from abroad who comes to lead services.

In January 2026, the local government said that it will invest RD$50 million in the renovations and improvements to the Jewish Museum and attached synagogue in Sosúa. In August 2026, President Luis Abinader announced plans for a new museum building.

== Research ==
A great deal of research on the subject of Dominican Jewry was done by Rabbi Henry Zvi Ucko (1910-1995) who had been a writer and teacher in Germany until political conditions and growing anti-Semitism forced him to emigrate in 1939. His travels eventually took him to the Dominican Republic, where he organized a congregation in Santo Domingo (Ciudad Trujillo) and began researching the history of Jews in the country. His research covered much of the history of the Sephardic Jews there and documented the assimilation that the population went through (and was going through) during his time. Included in his research is correspondence with Haim Horacio López Penha, a Dominican Jewish writer, who encouraged Ucko to write a history of the Jews in the Dominican Republic. More recently, the publication of the book "Once Jews" has made easily available information on many early Jewish settlers in the Dominican Republic. Scholars such as the historian of the town of Baní, Manuel Valera, as well as Dr. Yehonatan Demota, continue the study of Dominican Sephardic and converso ancestry, and the question of the Dominican anusim.
