= Dominican Republic–Israel relations =

- Dominican Republic: Israel

Dominican Republic–Israel relations are the bilateral relations between the Dominican Republic and Israel.

The Dominican Republic has an embassy in Tel Aviv. Israel has an embassy in Santo Domingo, and the embassy also serve other countries in the Caribbean Sea.

== History ==
=== Before 1948 ===
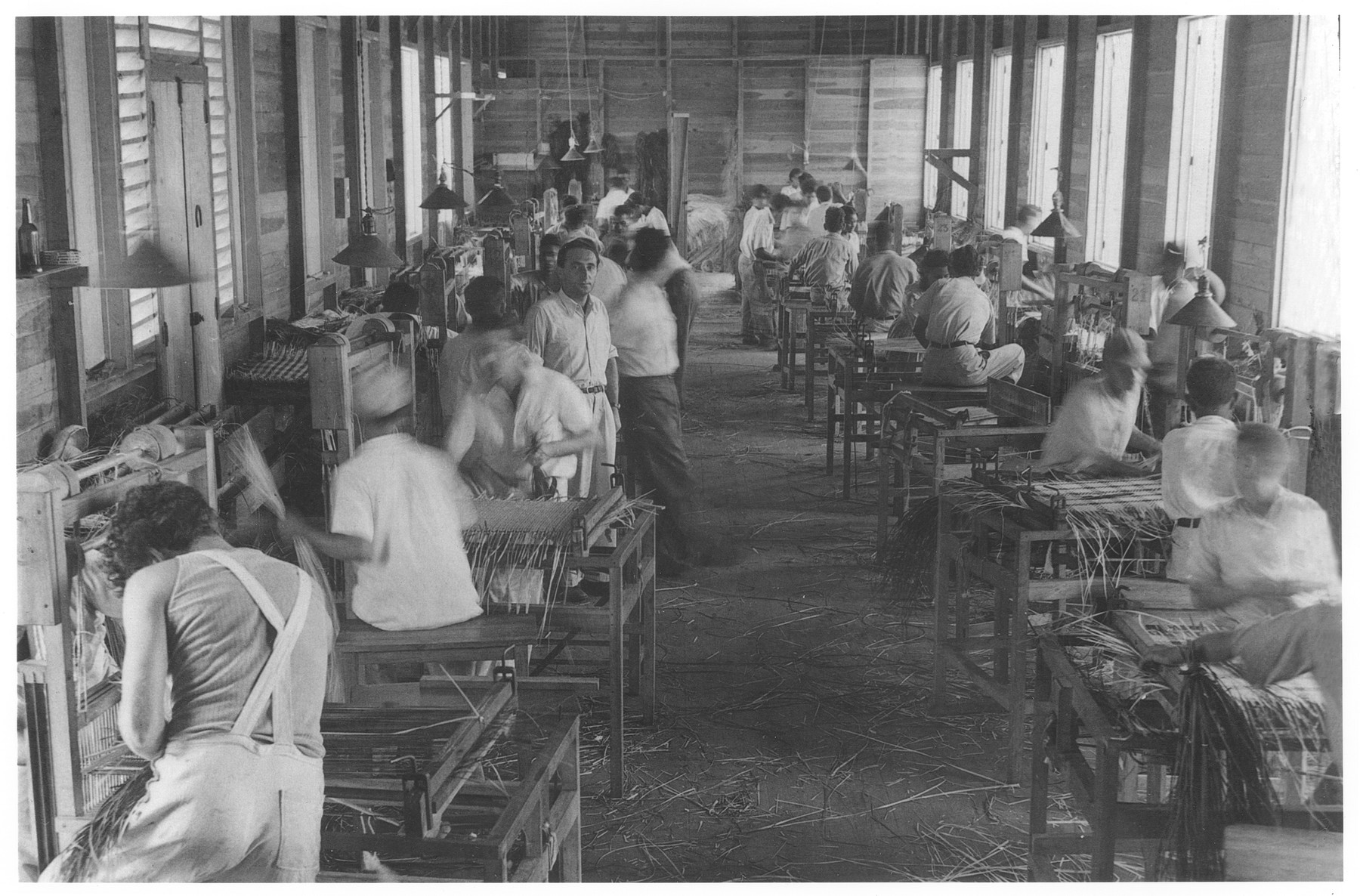
Jewish refugees in Sosúa work in a factory making handbags for export to the United States in the 1940s.

In the Évian Conference, the Dominican Republic was one of the only countries to accept large number of Jews fleeing from Europe. About 3,000 Jewish refugees established the town Sosúa in north of the Dominican Republic. In 1947 the Dominican Republic is one of the countries to vote in favor the Partition Plan.

=== From 1948 ===
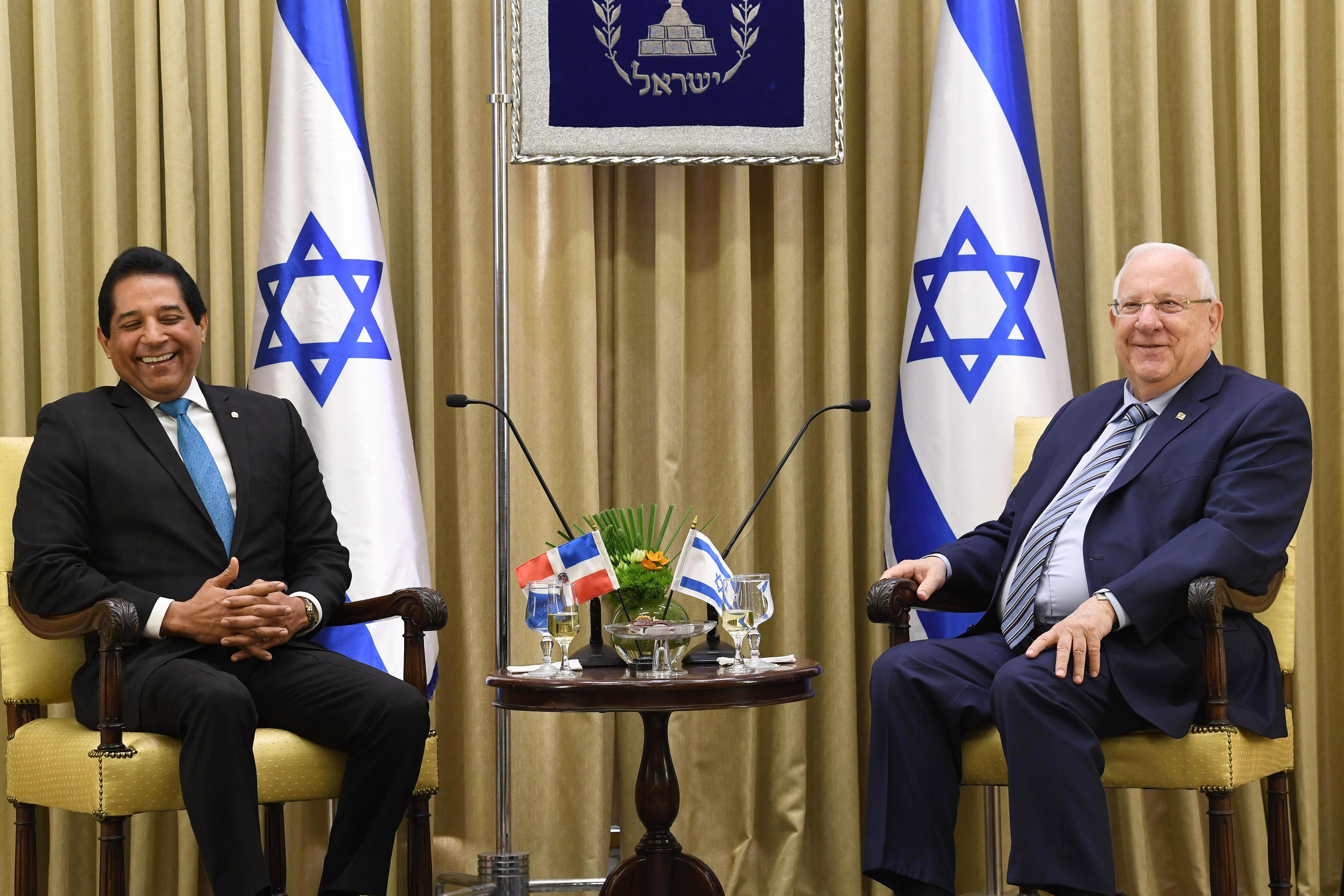
President of Israel, Reuven Rivlin, receives the credential of new Ambassador of the Dominican Republic, John Guiliani Valenzuela. (2018)

The Dominican Republic officially recognized the State of Israel on 30 December 1948, and relations were established in 1949. On the second of June 1955, the Dominican Republic appointed its first non-resident representative to Israel, which was based in Rome, Italy, Ambassador Telesforo R. Calderón. In 1964 the Dominican Republic opened its embassy in Jerusalem. In March 1965 the Deputy of the Prime Minister of Israel, Abba Eban, have visited the Dominican Republic, and in April 1971 the Minister of Foreign Affairs of the Dominican Republic have visited Israel. In 1980 the Dominican Republic moved its embassy to Tel Aviv due to international pressure of the UN Security Council Resolution 478. In 2020 the Dominican Republic considered to relocate its embassy back to Jerusalem.

== Economic relations ==
Investments of Israelis in the Dominican Republic are valued in millions of US Dollars, covering different fields of technology, agriculture, infrastructure, and tourism.

Israel - Dominican Republic trade in millions USD-$
	Israel imports Dominican Republic exports	Dominican Republic imports Israel exports	Total trade value
2023	3.8	29.3	33.1
2022	5.7	32.7	38.4
2021	5	29.2	34.2
2020	5.2	28.7	33.9
2019	6.4	26.2	32.6
2018	5.7	26.4	32.1
2017	4.6	26.2	30.8
2016	4.9	25.8	30.7
2015	12.9	20.2	33.1
2014	6.6	20.3	26.9
2013	4.4	24.1	28.5
2012	2.1	18.2	20.3
2011	2.6	20.2	22.8
2010	1.6	19.3	20.9
2009	0.8	17.1	17.9
2008	1	22.1	23.1
2007	0.9	23.5	24.4
2006	0.6	36.9	37.5
2005	0.2	16	16.2
2004	0.2	10.5	10.7
2003	0.4	11.8	12.2
2002	0.1	20.1	20.2

== Tourism ==
In May 1968, the Dominican Republic and Israel have signed an agreement on abolition of visa requirements which was entered into force in July 1968. In 1999, the Dominican Republic and Israel have signed an aviation agreement, and in 2016, first direct flights between the Dominican Republic and Israel began.

== Military and security relations ==
In 2019, the Israeli ambassador to the Dominican Republic offered Israeli technology for border security to the Dominican Republic as Dominican Republic fight illegal migration from Haiti. In 2020, Israel agreed to train elite Dominican units. The 2nd Battalion of the Military Police of the Dominican Republic Army uses has been equipped with new Israeli weapons.

== Israeli aid to the Dominican Republic ==
Since 1962, the Dominican Republic is one of the main recipient of aid from MASHAV, over 5,800 Dominicans have traveled to Israel to train in diverse areas. In 2024, the Israeli Embassy donated an advanced water filtration system.

== See also ==
- Foreign relations of the Dominican Republic
- Foreign relations of Israel
- History of the Jews in the Dominican Republic
