= Flerida =

Flerida is a given name. Notable people with the name include:

- Flérida de Nolasco (1891–1976), Dominican scholar and literary critic
- Flerida Ruth Pineda-Romero (1929–2017), Associate Justice of the Supreme Court of the Philippines
