= Centro Israelita de República Dominicana =

Synagogue in the Dominican Republic

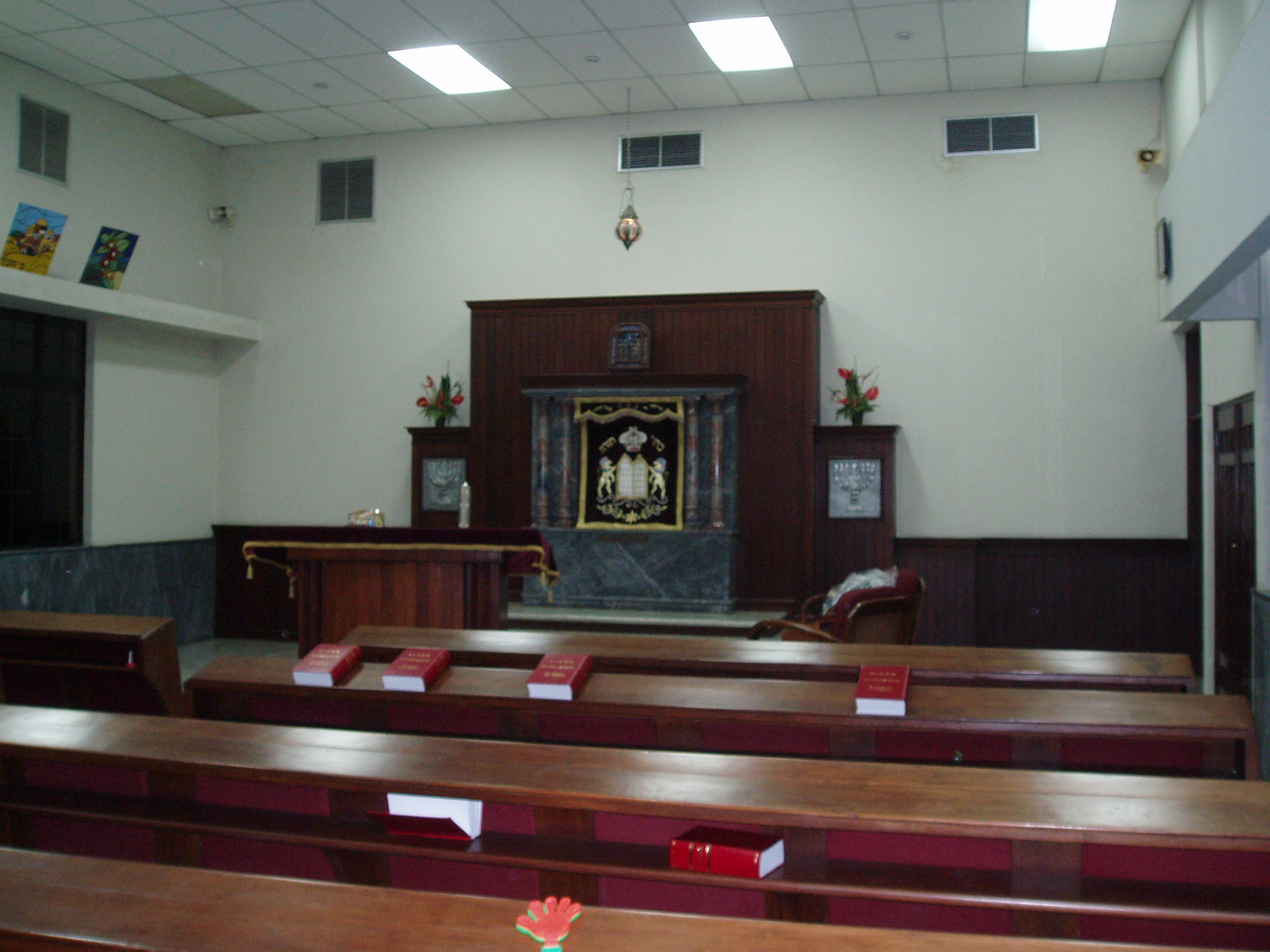
- The synagogue interior, in 2008

- Location of the synagogue in the Dominican Republic

Religion
- Affiliation: Judaism
- Rite: Sephardi
- Ecclesiastical or organizational status: Synagogue
- Leadership: Lay-led
- Status: Active

Location
- Location: Avenida Sarasota 21, Santo Domingo
- Country: Dominican Republic
- Interactive map of Centro Israelita de República Dominicana
- Administration: Comunidad Israelita República Dominicana
- Coordinates: 18°27′35″N 69°55′51″W

Architecture
- Established: c. 1930s (as a congregation)
- Completed: 1957

Website
- centroisraelitard.com (in Spanish)

The Centro Israelita de República Dominicana is a Jewish congregation and synagogue, located in Santo Domingo, in the Dominican Republic.

The Chabad Lubavitch movement was established in the Dominican Republic in 2008, and the congregation has grown and developed since then. There is no permanent rabbi in the Dominican Republic, with the congregations in Santo Domingo and Sosúa supported by visiting rabbis, predominately form Miami and Colombia.

== See also ==
- History of the Jews in the Dominican Republic
- List of synagogues in the Dominican Republic
