= Robinson Hilario =

Dominican Republic kiteboarder

Personal information
- Born: May 26, 1994 (age 31) Sosua, Dominican Republic
- Occupation: Professional kiteboarder
- Years active: 2010–present

Sport
- Country: Dominican Republic
- Sport: Kiteboarding
- Rank: Top 15 worldwide

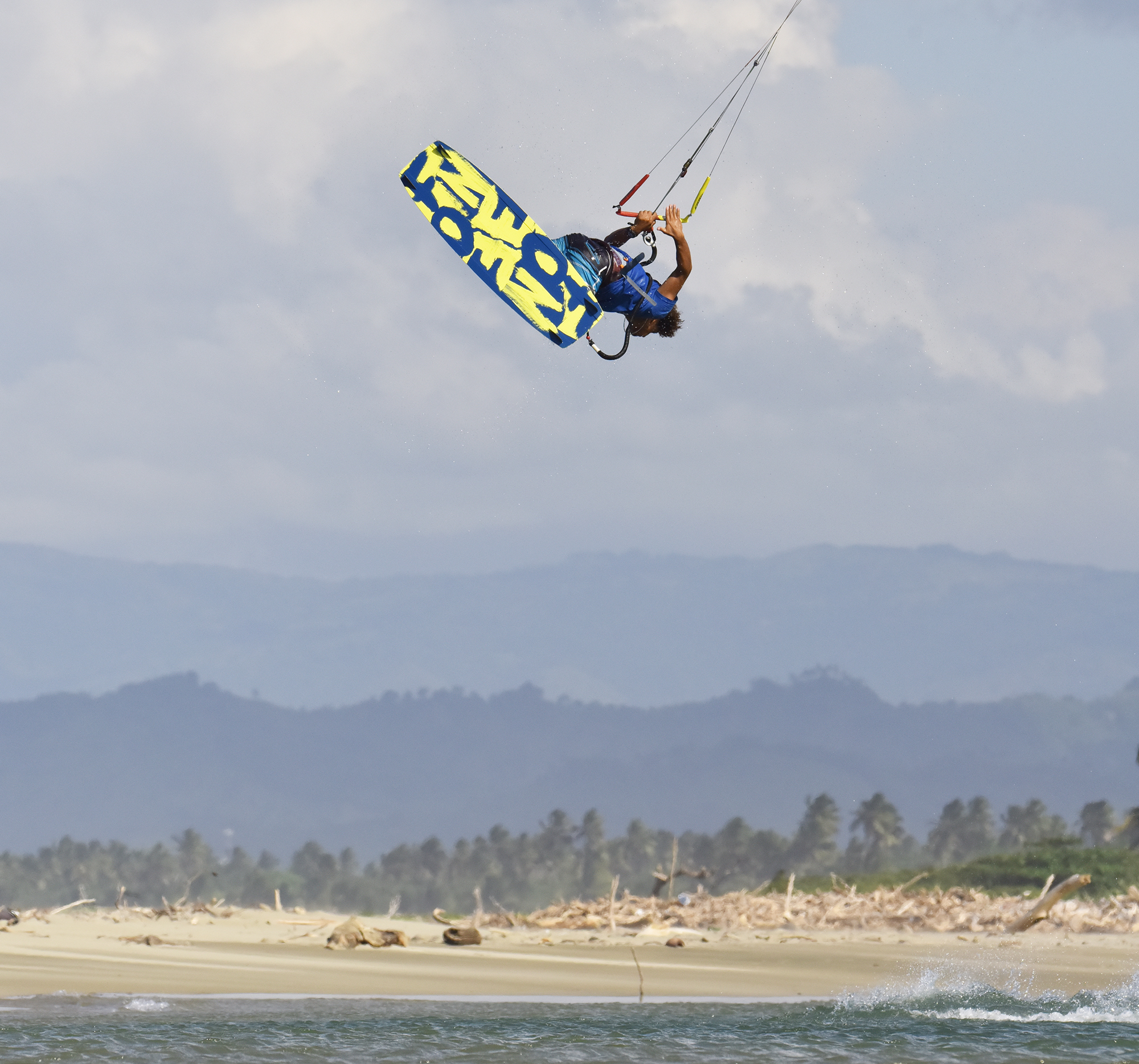
Hilario kiting in his home spot in Cabarete at a river mouth.

Robinson Hilario (born May 26, 1994) is a professional freestyle and big-air kiteboarder, born and based in the Dominican Republic. He is currently ranked within the Top 15 worldwide.

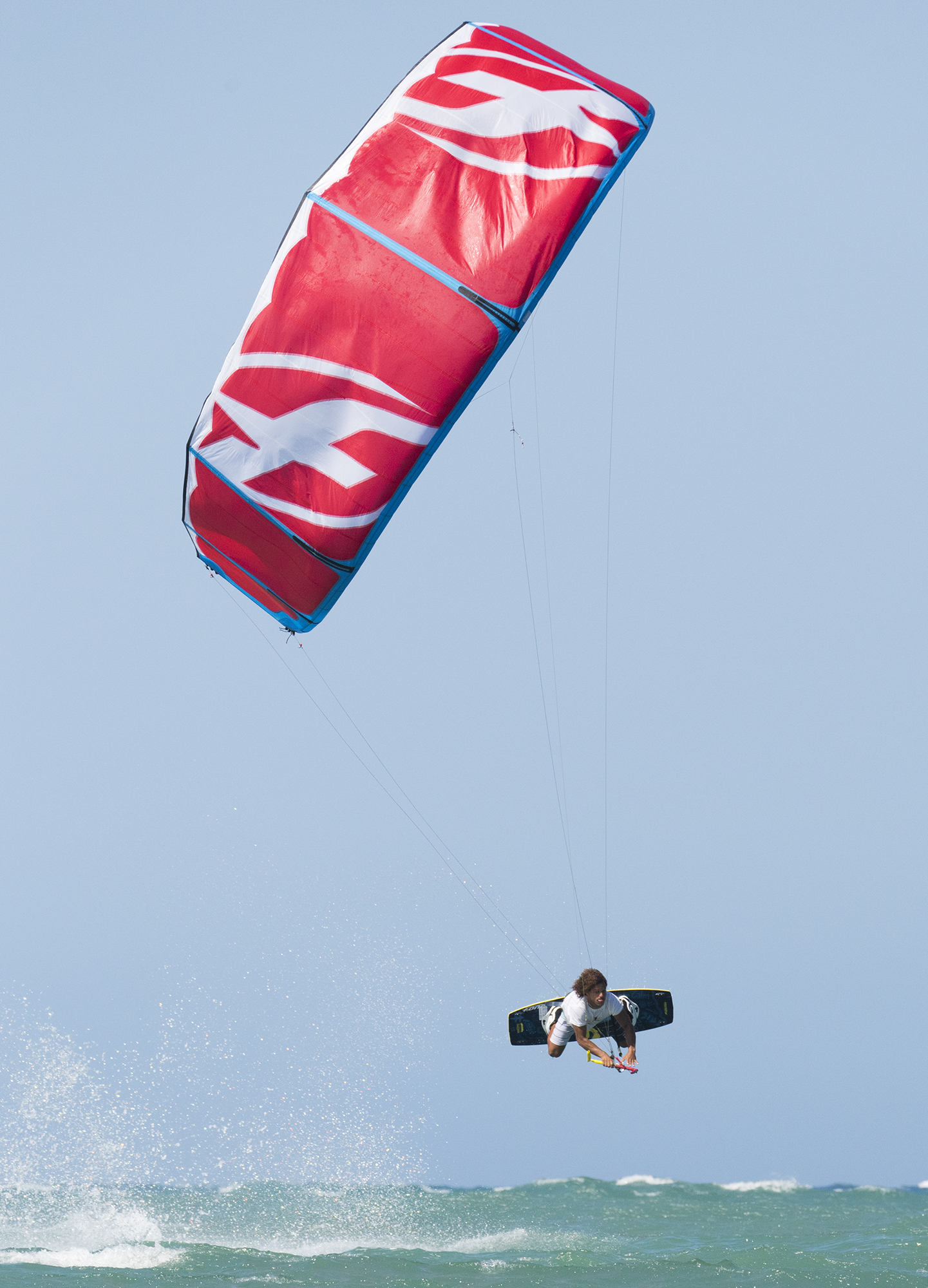
Hilario kiting with an F-One kite on kite beach, Cabarete

== Early life ==
Hilario was born on May 26, 1994, in Sosua, Dominican Republic. From humble beginnings, he began kiting when he was 10 years old when visiting kiters on the beach lent him their equipment. By 16, he became sponsored by F-One and began his professional career competing worldwide

== Career ==
- 2011: 4th overall in PKRA
- 2013: 7th overall in PKRA
- 2014: 2nd PKRA 2014
- 2017 + 2018: 2nd place, DR Open
- 2017: Top 11 worldwide; Top 9 GKA Air Games Cabarete
- 2018: Member of the Dominican Olympic Federation for Paris 2024

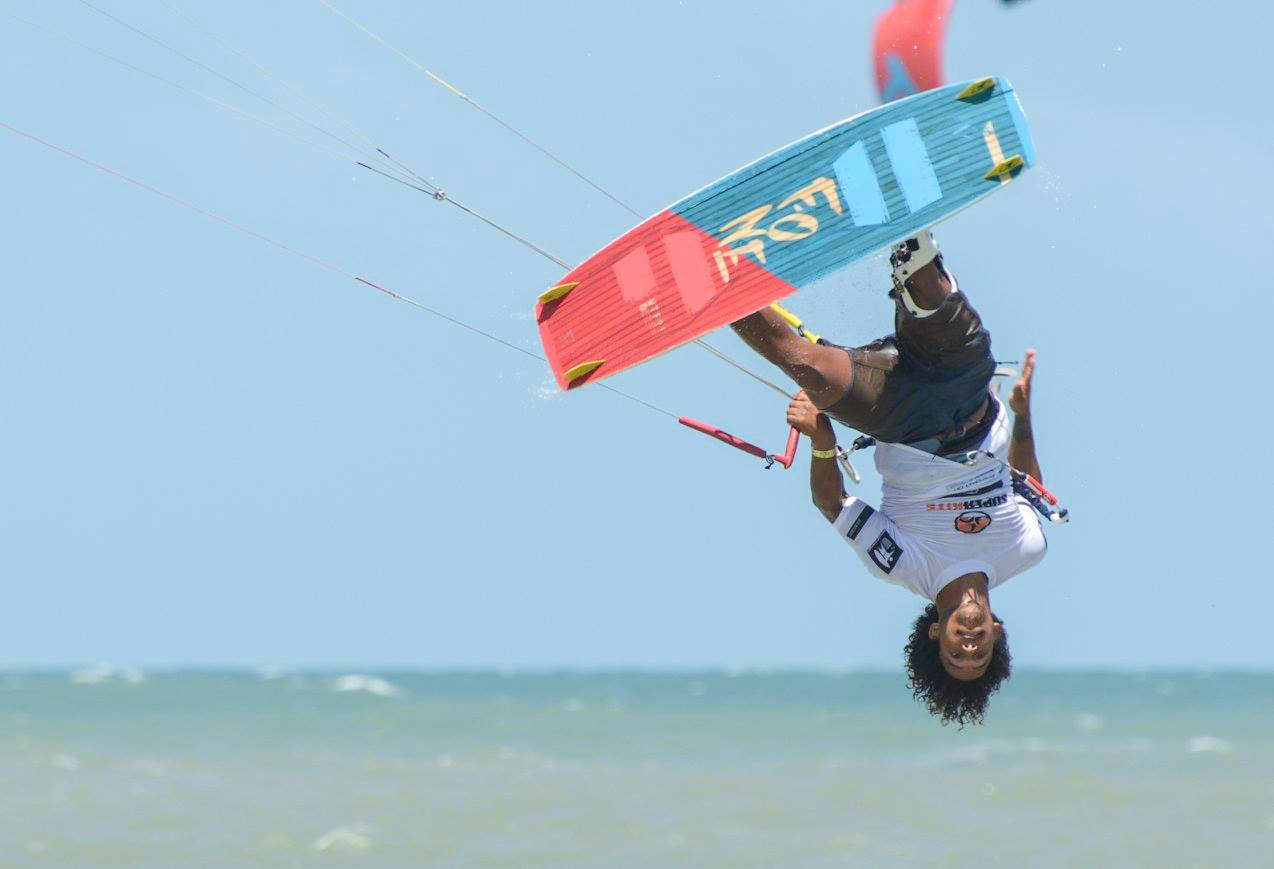
Robinson competing in the World Kiteboarding League tour in Turkey in 2017.
