= Ilana Neumann =

Dominican politician and lawyer

The Honourable Ilana Neumann

Mayor of Sosúa
- In office 16 August 2010 – 24 April 2020
- Preceded by: Vladimir Céspedes Vásquez (from 1996 to 2010) (PLD)
- Succeeded by: Wilfredo Olivences (2020–2024) (PRSC)

Member of the Chamber of Deputies of the Dominican Republic for the province of Puerto Plata
- In office 16 August 2002 – 16 August 2010

Personal details
- Born: Ilana Neumann Hernández Sosúa, Puerto Plata Province, Dominican Republic
- Party: Modern Revolutionary Party (since 2024)
- Other political affiliations: Dominican Revolutionary Party (until 2024)
- Spouse: Cyrano Azar
- Parents: Avi Neumann (father); Nieves Hernández (mother)
- Education: Unibe
- Profession: Lawyer
- Website: Ilana Neumann on Facebook

Ilana Neumann, in full Ilana Neumann de Azar (b. 1968 or 1969), is a Dominican politician and lawyer.

Neumann was born in Sosúa to Avi Neumann (the son of Jewish refugees of World War II, who immigrated to the Dominican Republic; also an Israeli citizen) and Nieves Hernández, both natives of Sosúa. She is married to Cyrano Azar Ramírez, whose paternal grandparents (Aris Azar and Maria Hedded) were Lebanese immigrants.

Neumann was deputy for Puerto Plata Province from 2002 to 2010; elected in 2002 and re-elected in 2006. She was Mayor of Sosúa, elected in 2010, and re-elected in 2016.

Neumann is the first woman of Jewish descent to be elected as mayor in the Dominican Republic.
