= Federico Henríquez y Carvajal =

Dominican writer, journalist and teacher

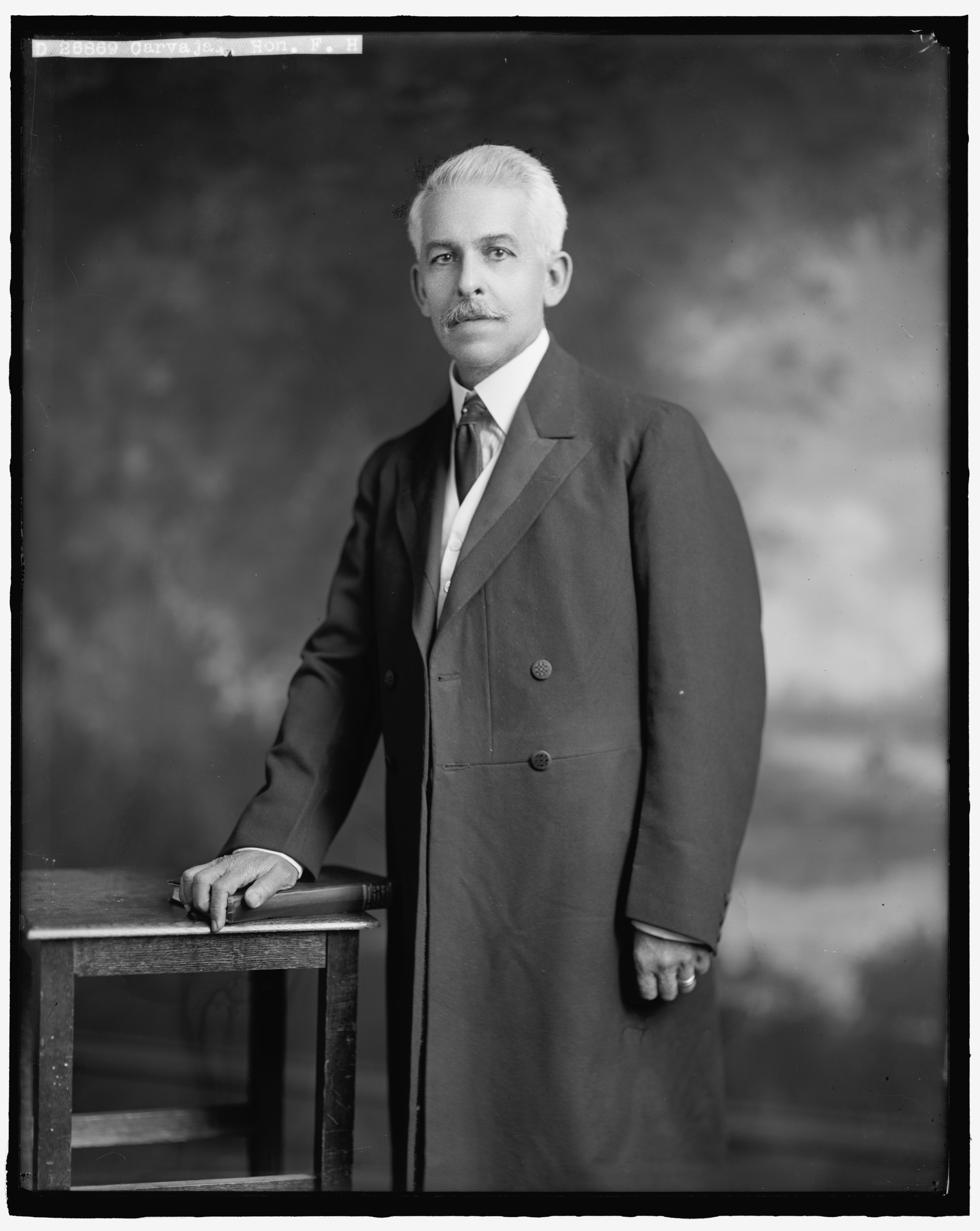

Federico Henríquez y Carvajal (16 September 1848 – 4 February 1952) was a Dominican writer, journalist and teacher.

== Biography ==
Born in Santo Domingo, Henríquez y Carvajal was the son of Noel Henríquez Altías, a Dutch Sephardic Jew from Curaçao, and Clotilde Carvajal Fernández, a Dominican woman; he had 10 siblings, including Francisco Henríquez y Carvajal, who was President of the Dominican Republic. Henríquez was uncle of Francisco, Pedro, Max, and Camila Henríquez Ureña.

He was married to Carmen María Amalia García Ricardo and had 10 children: Ángel Porfirio, Flor de María Gregoria, Fernando Abel, Luz, Carmela, Enriquillo, Federico Noel, Luis Adolfo, Salvador Colombino, and Carmita María Adelina.

Henríquez was Rector of the University of Santo Domingo and Chairman of the Dominican Academy of History. He also was Justice-President of the Supreme Court of the Dominican Republic and Minister of Home Affairs.

Academic offices
First	Chairman of the Dominican Academy of History; 1931–1944	Succeeded by Manuel de Jesús Troncoso de la Concha
