= Mercedes Laura Aguiar =

Dominican educator and feminist (1872–1958)

- Born: Mercedes Laura Aguiar Mendoza; 16 February 1872; Santo Domingo, Dominican Republic
- Died: 1 January 1958 (aged 85); Santo Domingo, Dominican Republic
- Occupations: educator, writer, feminist
- Years active: 1887–1958

Mercedes Laura Aguiar (16 February 1872 – 1 January 1958) was an educator and feminist from the Dominican Republic. As a journalist and poet, she wrote works to promote equality of men and women and Dominican sovereignty, writing in opposition to the US occupation. As a feminist, she fought for the right to vote, the right of women to education, and employment protections for women and children.

== Early life ==
Mercedes Laura Aguiar Mendoza was born on 16 February 1872 in Santo Domingo, Dominican Republic to María Antonia Mendoza and Eugenio Aguiar. She attended the school established by Salomé Ureña, known as "Instituto de Señoritas" and which was the first higher education facility in the Dominican Republic. In 1887, Aguiar was in the first graduating class of the school along with Leonor M. Feltz, Altagracia Henríquez Perdomo, Luisa Ozema Pellerano, Catalina Pou, and Ana Josefa Puello

== Career ==
Upon completion of her studies, Aguiar began teaching at the Institute and remained there until 1893, when the school closed because of the illness of its founder. She then worked in the school founded by her classmate Luisa Ozema Pellerano and her sister Eva María and then served for 30 years in the Institute of Salomé Ureña.

When the United States invaded and occupied the Dominican Republic in 1916, Aguiar joined with a vocal group of women, to form the Sociedad Amantes de a Luz (Society of the Lovers of the Light of Day). She served as the group's secretary and they spoke out against the U.S. invading the country and violating its sovereignty. She served in the same capacity on the Junta Patriótica de Damas (Board of Patriotic Ladies) These ladies were striving for the recognition of not only nationalist rights, but women's rights and worked on various causes, including establishment of maternity and children's hospitals, orphanages, and nurses' training facilities; free health care and medical services for the poor, health campaigns throughout the country to end endemic diseases, nutrition education, sanitary housing and playgrounds for working class neighborhoods and child care centers for working mothers; and educational improvements including school breakfasts and lunches, adequate uniforms, development of school libraries, and trade education.

In 1942, she was appointed as the delegate for Santo Domingo to the First Congress of Dominican Women, which aimed at improving the educational opportunities of women to improve their socio-economic and political opportunities but also make them better helpmates for the men in their lives. Shortly after the conference, women won the right to vote that same year. In 1945, Aguiar was one of the special delegates appointed to counsel the Convention of the Dominican Party so that "The Reform of the Principles and Statutes" addressed the concerns of women. The women pushed for reforms for maternity laws to protect women workers.

In addition to her teaching and activism, Aguiar was active as a writer, publishing many articles in such journals as La crónica, La Cuna de América, El Eco de la Opinión, Letras y Ciencias, Listín Diario, and La Revista Literaria. While most of her works have been lost, Adolfina Henríquez de Smith collected a group of them and made a mimeographed binder of some of her most noted works, including the speech she made at the 1942 Women's Congress. In 1937, after fifty years of teaching, she was commemorated by the Ministry of Education and in 1944 granted the Gold Medal of Honor for Education by the government.

== Death and legacy ==
Aguiar died of heart problems on 1 January 1958 in Santo Domingo. Posthumously, she was recognized for her contributions to the development of education in the Dominican Republic by a street and a school which bear her name.
