= Salomé Ureña =

Dominican poet and educator (1850–1897)

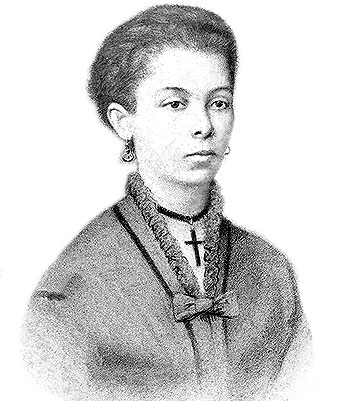
- Born: Salomé Ureña Díaz; October 11, 1850; Santo Domingo, Dominican Republic
- Died: March 6, 1897 (aged 46); Santo Domingo, Dominican Republic
- Resting place: National Pantheon of the Dominican Republic
- Occupation: Writer • pedagogy
- Years active: 1867–1881
- Spouse: Francisco Henríquez y Carvajal
- Children: Francisco Noel Henríquez Ureña, Pedro Henríquez Ureña, Maximiliano Henríquez Ureña, Camila Salomé Henríquez Ureña
- Parent(s): Nicolás Ureña de Mendoza and Gregoria Díaz de León

Salomé Ureña Díaz de Henríquez (October 21, 1850 – March 6, 1897) was a Dominican poet and teacher, being one of the central figures of 19th-century lyrical poetry and advocator for women's education in the Dominican Republic, influenced by the positivist schools and the normal education of Eugenio María de Hostos, of whom she was an advantaged student. Her works focused on patriotism and family environment.

Although not very extensive, she managed to attract the attention of much of Latin America due to the depth of her works. Among her most notable works are: Offering to the Homeland, The bird and the nest and Shadows, To my mother, among others.

== Life ==
She was born in Santo Domingo, Dominican Republic on October 21, 1850. She was the daughter of writer Nicolás Ureña de Mendoza and Gregoria Díaz de León both from Santo Domingo, their marriage union lasted five years. Her father was a politician and journalist who held positions in the judiciary and congress. Despite the separation of her parents, the relationship of Salomé with her father was endearing and undoubtedly fundamental in her intellectual and moral formation.

Salomé learned to read with her mother and at the age of four, which reveals the care of both parents, who gave a solid training to Salomé. She attended the elementary schools of her time, while her studies as a teenager was done under the guidance of her father, from whom she received extensive literary instruction.

Salomé learned the verses of her father's favorite bards, her cultural level was nourished by Spanish classics as well English and French literature.

She began writing verses at the age of fifteen, later publishing her first works at the age of seventeen, with a characteristic imprint of spontaneity and tenderness. In 1867 she published her first works under the pseudonym "Herminia", a name she used until 1874.

On February 11, 1880, at the age of twenty-nine, she married the doctor and writer Francisco Henríquez y Carvajal, a politician who achieved the presidency of the Dominican Republic. She had four children with him: Francisco, Pedro, Max and Camila. Her children's would later become highly respected figures of contemporary literature of the mid- and late twentieth century as writers, philosophers, poets, humanists and art critics.

== Contribution to education ==
Around 1881, Salomé with the help of her husband opened one of the first centers of higher education for young women in the Dominican Republic, which she named "Instituto de Señoritas". (Note: The first secondary institution offering co-educational schooling in the country had been opened by Socorro Sánchez del Rosario before 1870 in Santiago de los Caballeros and Sánchez then opened the Colegio La Altagracia (High Grace College) for women in Santo Domingo in 1881, graduating the first licensed teacher of the nation, Dolores Rodríguez Objío, in 1883.) Within five years, the first six female teachers had graduated from the institute, something uncommon at the time. The first graduating class included Mercedes Laura Aguiar, Leonor M. Feltz, Altagracia Henríquez Perdomo, Luisa Ozema Pellerano, Catalina Pou, and Ana Josefa Puello.

== Legacy ==
In 1874, at the age of 23, Salomé participated in the publication of an anthology of contemporary poets. "La Lira de Quisqueya", a work that was circulated about the first anniversary of the overthrow of the despotic government of Buenaventura Báez and in which seven poems by Salomé were included: The Glory of Progress, Remembrance of a Proscript, Melancholy, Answer, My Homeland, Gratitude, and A Hymn. In the investitures held between 1887 and 1893, she assumes more defined positions on political level, questions the despotism of the Ulises Heureaux regime, religious intolerance and authoritarianism; she echoes the voices that denounce the intransigence of some of the sectors.

With the passage of time, her work became tragic and sad with poems such as In hours of anguish; or patriotic and energetic as can be seen in her poems A la Patria y Ruinas. In later years, she included autobiographical themes in her poems, as can be seen in Mi Pedro, dedicated to her son, perhaps her most affectionate poem, in The Arrival of Winter and a book that became very popular called Esteban, where she talks about her country, her family, plants and flowers.

== Death ==
Ureña died on March 6, 1897, at age 46, due to complications of tuberculosis. Buried in the church of Nuestra Señora de las Mercedes and then, in 1972, she was transferred to the Pantheon of the Homeland.

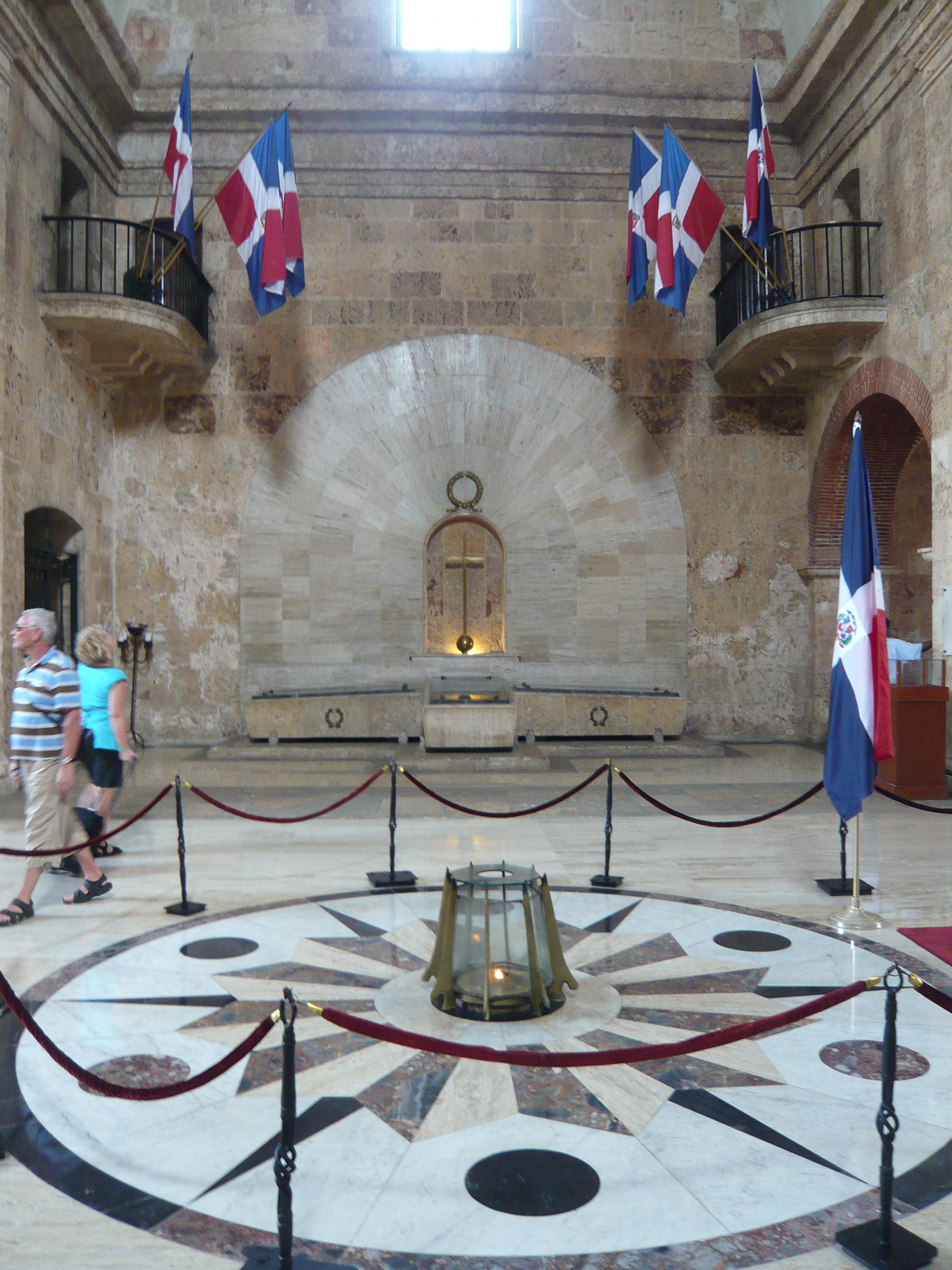
Pantheon National with mausoleum of Salome Urena, Santo Domingo.

== Partial Bibliography ==
- 1873 – The glory of progress
- 1876 – Ruins
- 1877 – The arrival of winter
- 1878 – Faith in the future
- 1880 – Anacaona
- 1880 – Poetry of Salomé Ureña de Henríquez
- 1881 – Shadows
- 1897 – My Pedro
- 1902 – Herminia

== Ancestry ==
Ancestors of Salomé Ureña

8. Carlos Ureña Jiménez (?–1786)
4. Francisco Ureña Mañón (1784–?)
9. Catalina Mañón
2. Nicolás Ureña de Mendoza (1822–1875)
10. José Valerio de Mendoza
5. Ramona de Mendoza
1. Salomé Ureña Díaz (1850–1897)
12. Ignacio Díaz de la Sota (1757–1827)
6. Pedro Díaz de Castro
13. Teresa de Castro Mañón
3. Gregoria Díaz de León (1819–1914)
14. Domingo de León y Fajardo
7. Teresa de León y la Concha
15. María Florentina de la Concha y Hurtado de Mendoza

== Bibliography ==
- Enciclopedia dominicana, vol. 7 (1978), pp. 183–185.
- Diane E. Martínez, ed., Spanish American Women Writers (1990).
- Salomé Ureña De Henríquez, Poesías completas (1989).

=== Additional Bibliography ===
- Castro Ventura, Santiago. Salomé Ureña: Jornada fecunda. Santo Domingo: Editora de Colores, 1998.
- Céspedes, Diógenes. Salomé Ureña y Hostos. Santo Domingo: Secretaría de Estado de Cultura and Biblioteca Nacional Pedro Henríquez Ureña, 2002.
- Cocco DeFilippis, Daisy, selection and prologue. Sin otro profeta que su canto: Antología de poesía escrita por dominicanas. Santo Domingo: Taller, 1988.
