= Sosúa =

- Municipality
- Puerto Plata
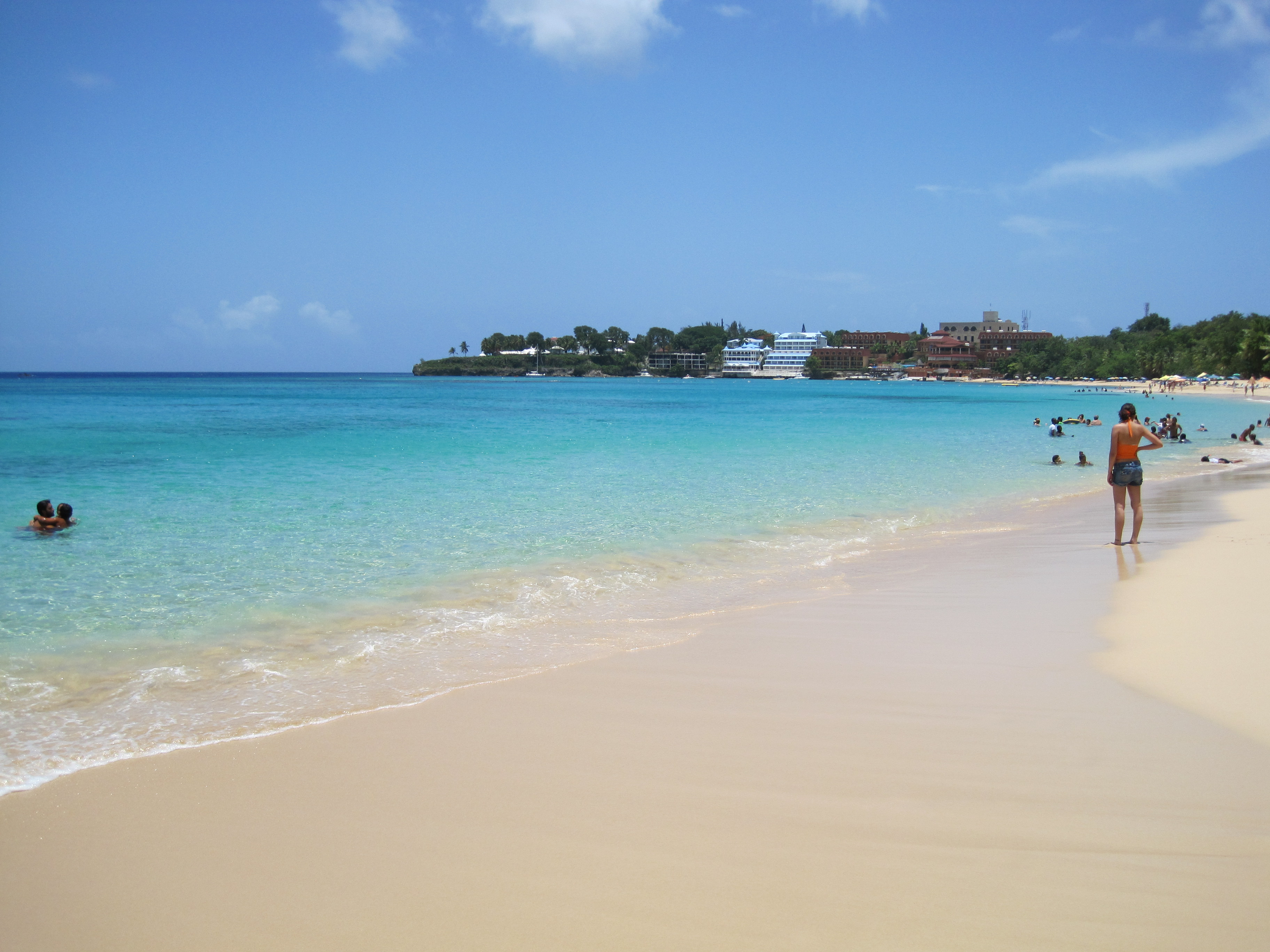
- Sosúa beach

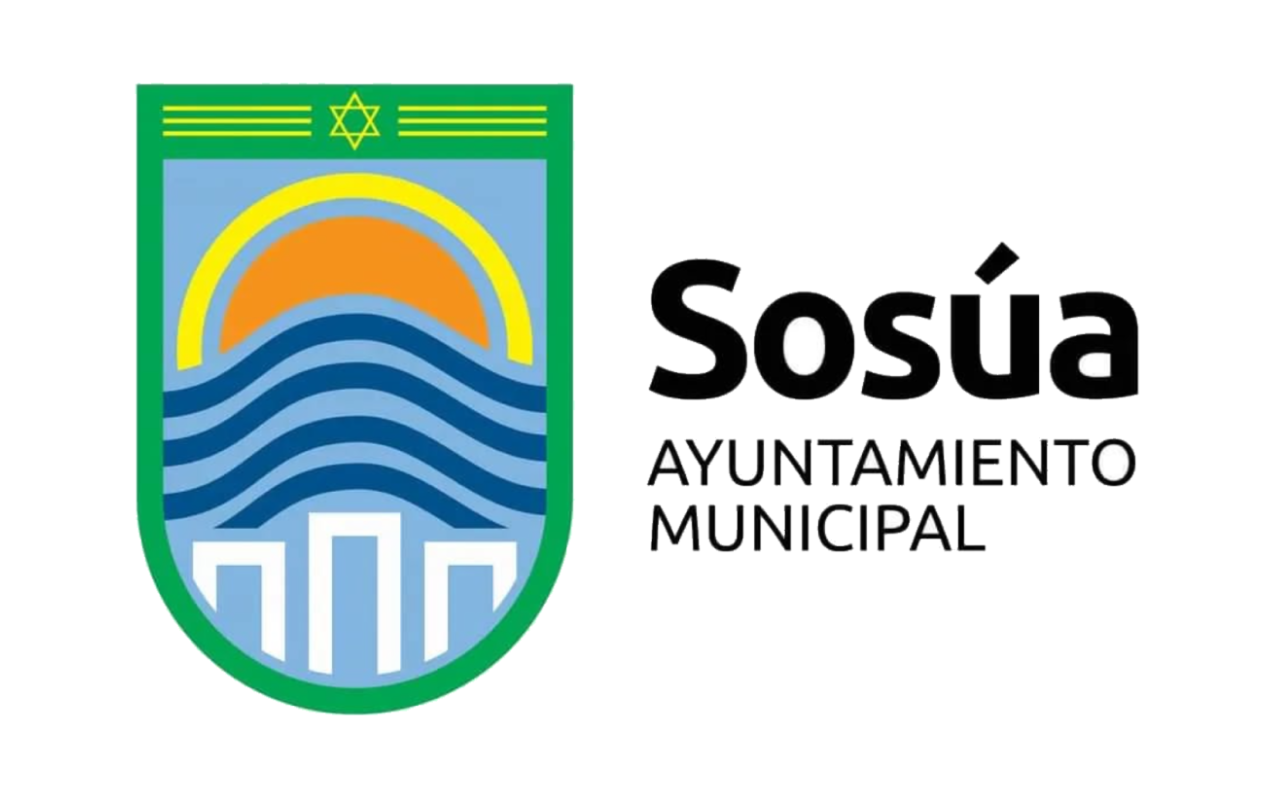
- Flag Coat of arms

- Sosúa in the Dominican Republic
- Coordinates: 19°45′00″N 70°31′12″W
- Country: Dominican Republic
- Province: Puerto Plata

Government
  - Mayor: Wilfredo Olivences (Social Christian Reformist Party)

Area
  - Municipality: 276.89 km^{2} (106.91 sq mi)

Population (2010)
  - Municipality: 49,593
  - Density: 179.11/km^{2} (463.89/sq mi)
  - Urban: 7,713
- Municipal districts: 2
- Distance to – Santo Domingo: 240 km (150 mi)

Sosúa is a beach town and municipality in the Puerto Plata Province of the Dominican Republic. The Gregorio Luperón International Airport is located in the western part of the municipality.

The town is divided into three sectors: El Batey, which is the main tourist section and on the east side of the main beach (Playa Sosúa); Los Charamicos, on the west end of the beach; north of them, toward the airport, is Sosúa Abajo.

Sosua is accessed primarily by Camino Cinco, or Highway 5, which runs the country's northern coastline.

== History ==
The town of Sosúa was officially founded by Jewish refugees fleeing from Nazi Germany. At the 1939 Evian Conference, Rafael Trujillo offered to accept up to 100,000 Jewish refugees; about 800 German and Austrian Jewish refugees received visas issued by the Dominican government between 1940 and 1945 and settled in Sosúa. An agreement was made between Trujillo and Jewish businessmen in New York City. The government provided the settlers with land and resources with which they created a food factory and company named Productos Sosúa.

Descendants of the original Jewish settlers still live in Sosúa; among them is the former mayor Ilana Neumann. They remain an important segment of the community and maintain a synagogue and a museum. In January 2026, the local government said that it will invest RD$50 million in the renovations and improvements to the Jewish Museum and attached synagogue. In August 2026, President Luis Abinader announced plans for a new museum building.

== Description ==
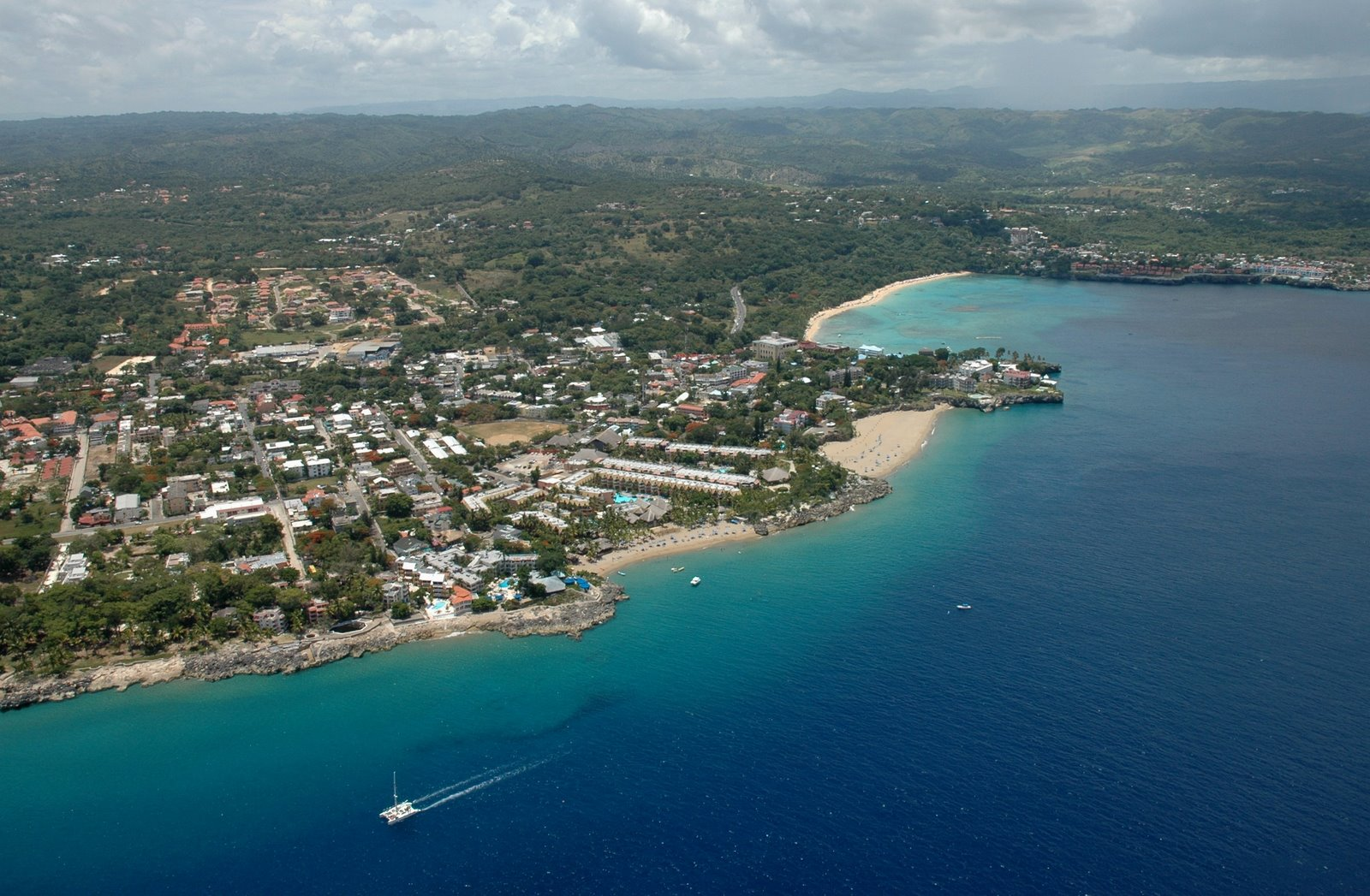
Aerial view of the town.

Sosúa Abajo, which translates roughly to "Lower Sosúa", is located on the western side of Sosúa in a valley nearby a river that flows into Sosúa Bay. Mainly a rural area of Sosúa, Sosúa Abajo houses many of the workers who commute to the El Batey area, nearby Cabarete Bay and Playa Dorada.

The Barrio of Los Charamicos, between El Batey and Abajo, is a densely populated urban area known for its nightlife, dancing, and bar scene.

== The bay and beach ==
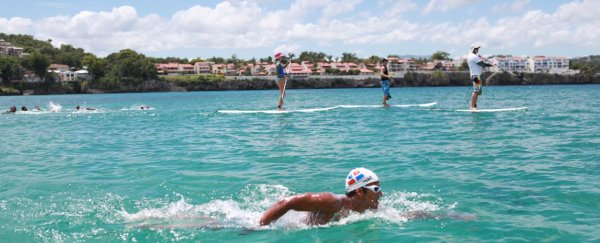
Dominican ultra-distance swimmer Marcos Diaz off Sosúa beach

Sosúa Bay attracts many water sports enthusiasts, including snorkelers and divers because of its sheltered, calm waters, diverse species of fish and intricate reef structures. In the winter, whale watching is also a popular tourist activity in Sosúa Bay.

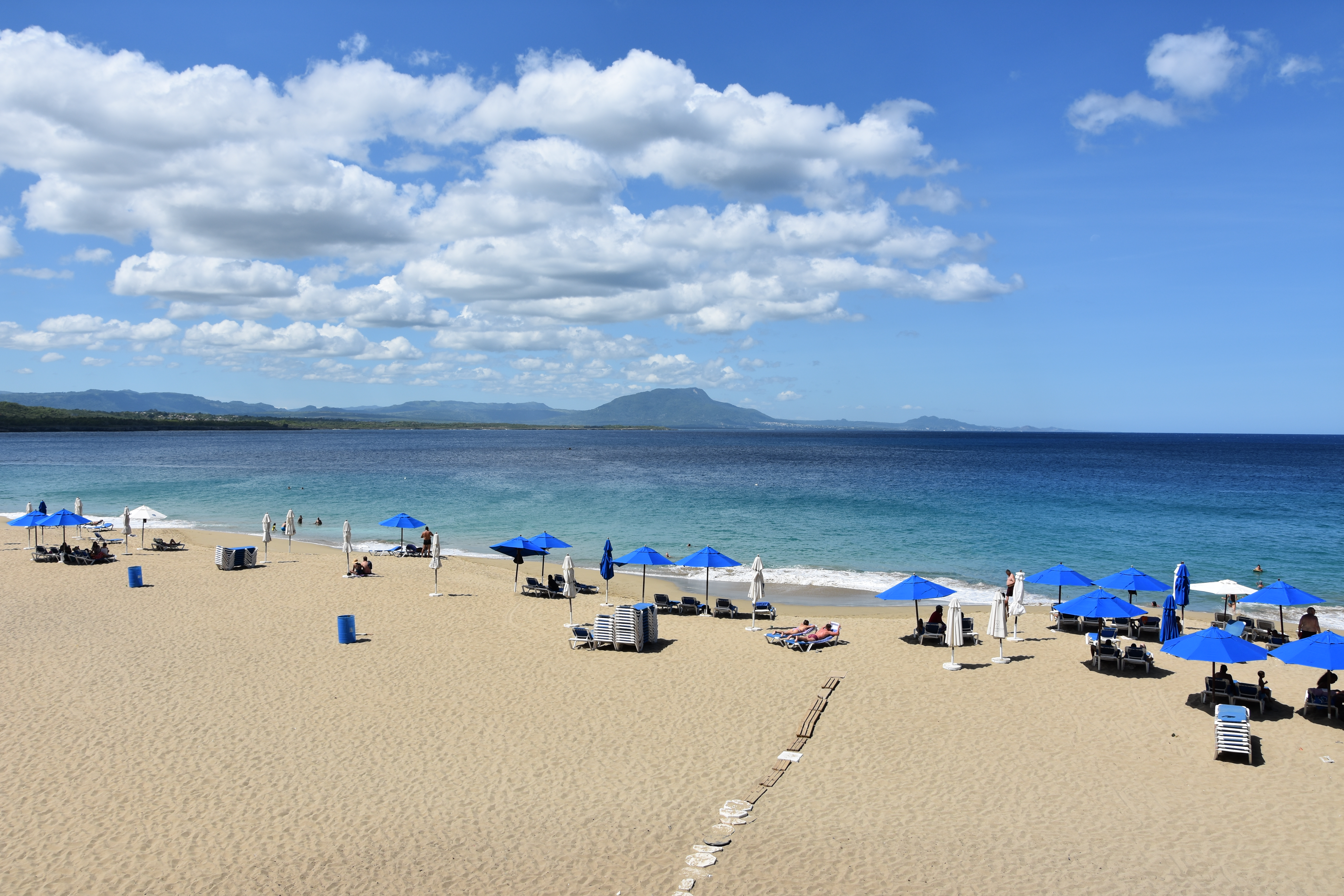
Playa Alicia in Sosúa

Recently, naturally occurring beach replenishment has created a new beach just north of Sosúa Bay, depositing sand where there were previously only sheer rock cliffs. The beach is called Playa Alicia.

There are several other beaches, Sosúa Beach, which is a crescent-shaped bay protected by coral formations. Sosúa's other beaches are Waterfront (Playa Alicia), Paradise beach (actually shifts on and off every several months), Playa Imbert and Playa Chiquita. Waterfront beach is just 23–24 years old, created after a storm around 2002.

== Sex tourism ==
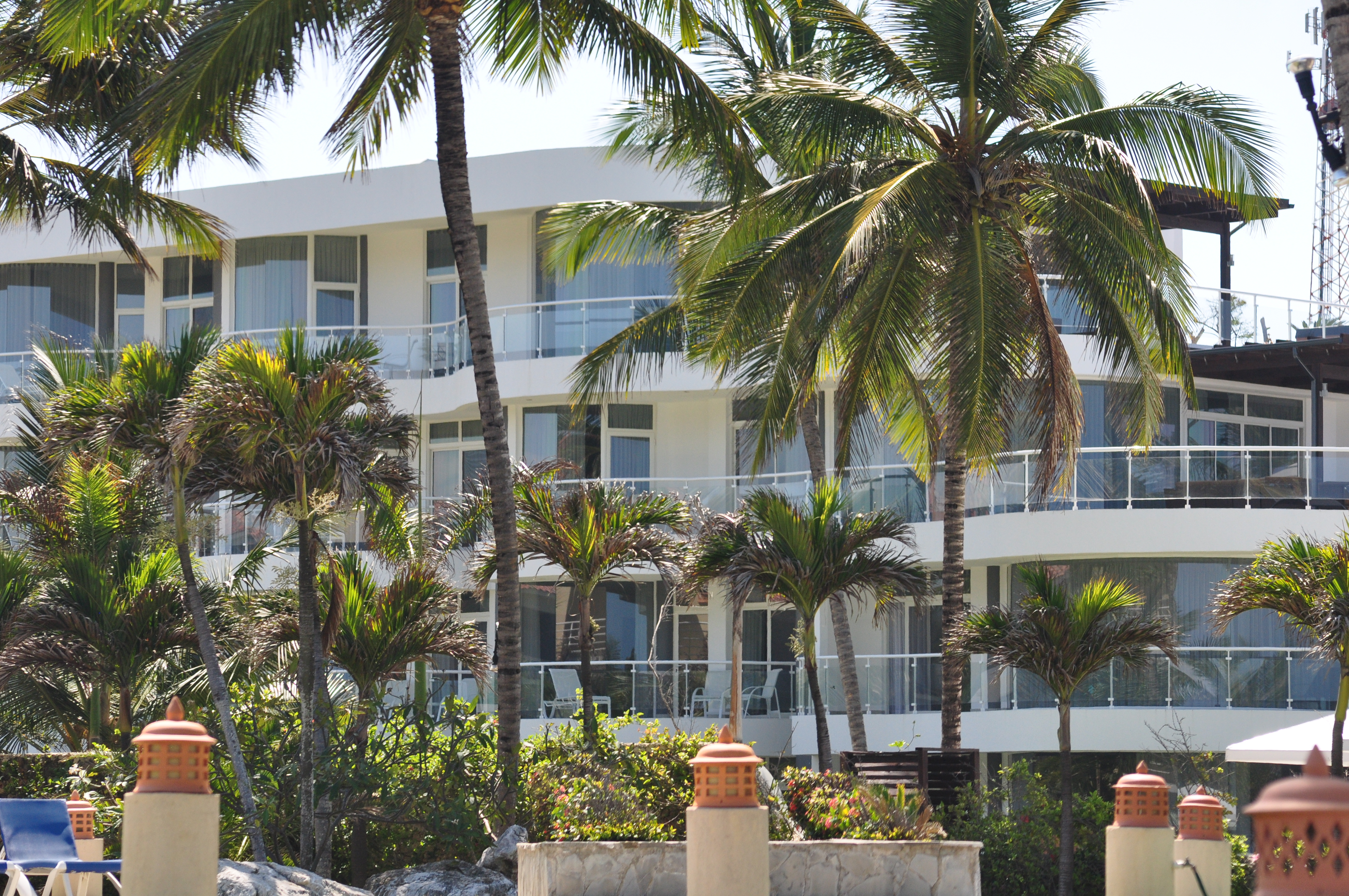
Resort building in Sosúa, Dominican Republic.

Sosua became a popular tourist destination with the rise of the tourism industry in the Puerto Plata area during the 1980s. In the late 1990s and 2000s Sosúa also became a favorite destination of sex tourists from Europe and North America. Starting in the late 2000s there was an effort to crack down on this industry, which caused a decline.

Sosúa remains a destination for sex tourism, though with a poorer clientele. Local women turn to prostitution as the town has fewer economic opportunities compared to larger cities of the country. Haitian migrants also take part in the sex tourism business, with many of the prostitutes in some areas being of Haitian descent. At sex tourism sites the lighter Dominicans are favored over darker Haitians, who are forced to work in the streets or local bars rather than the more lucrative up-scale areas.

== Gallery ==
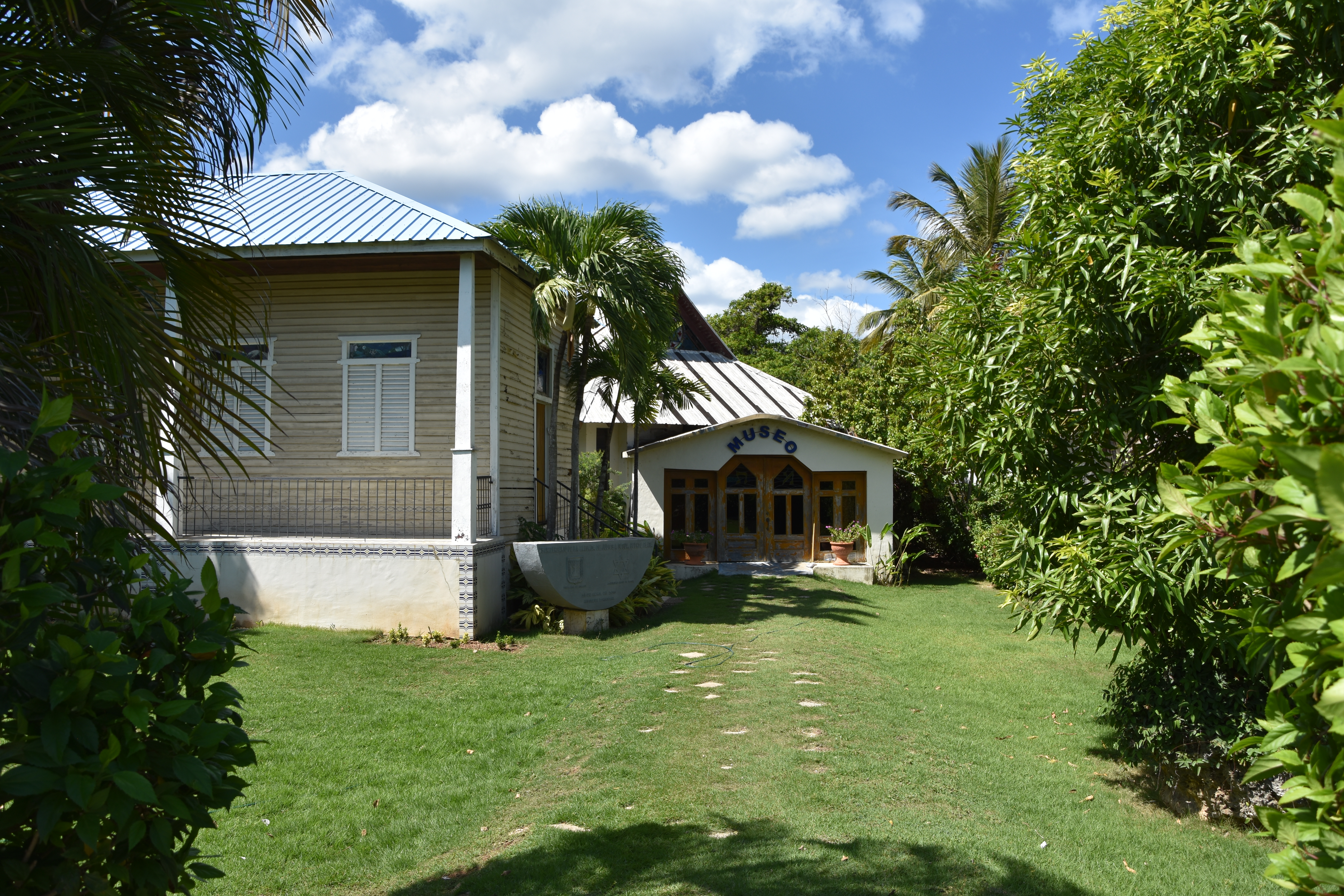
Jewish museum

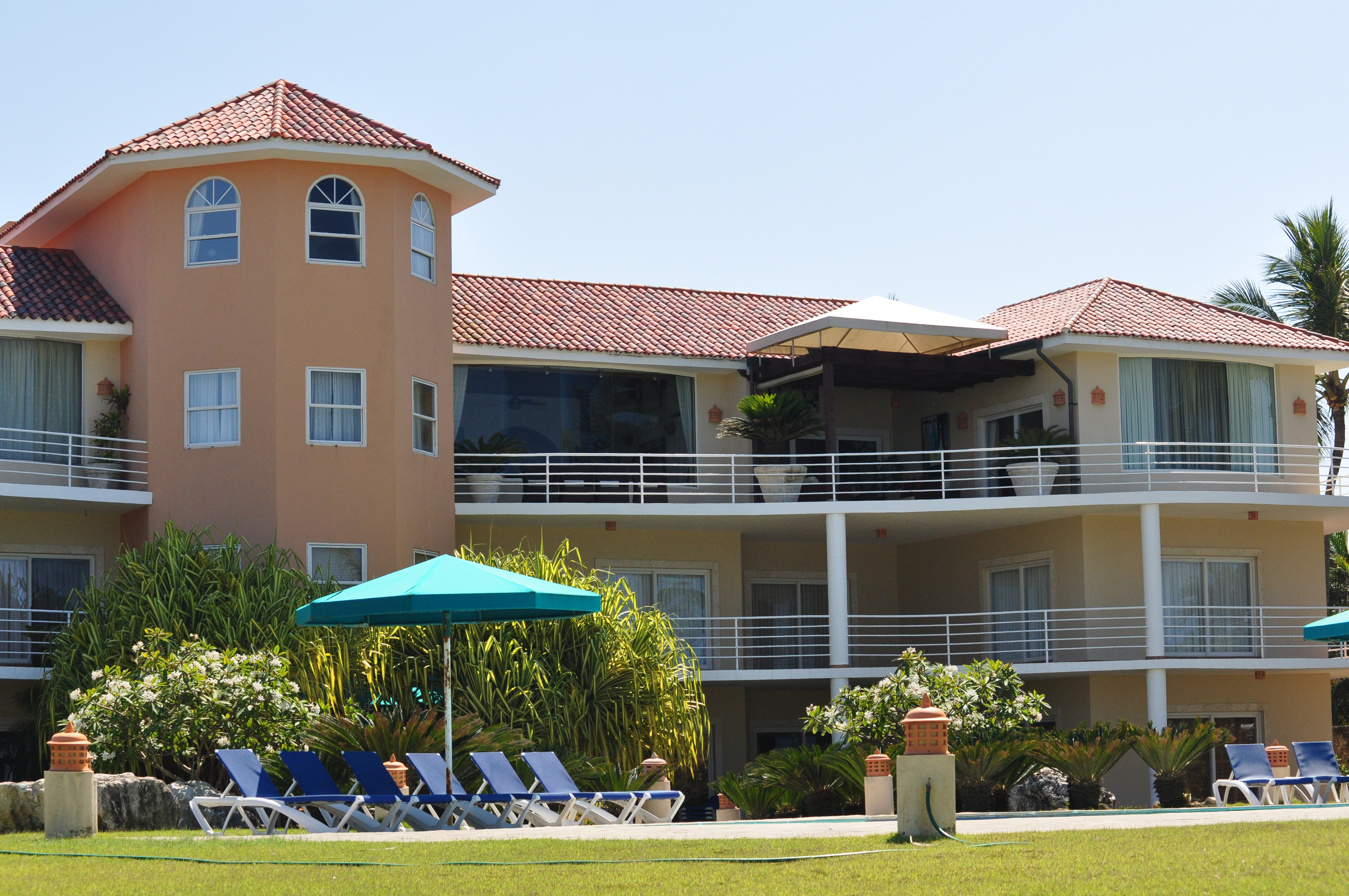
Sosúa resort area

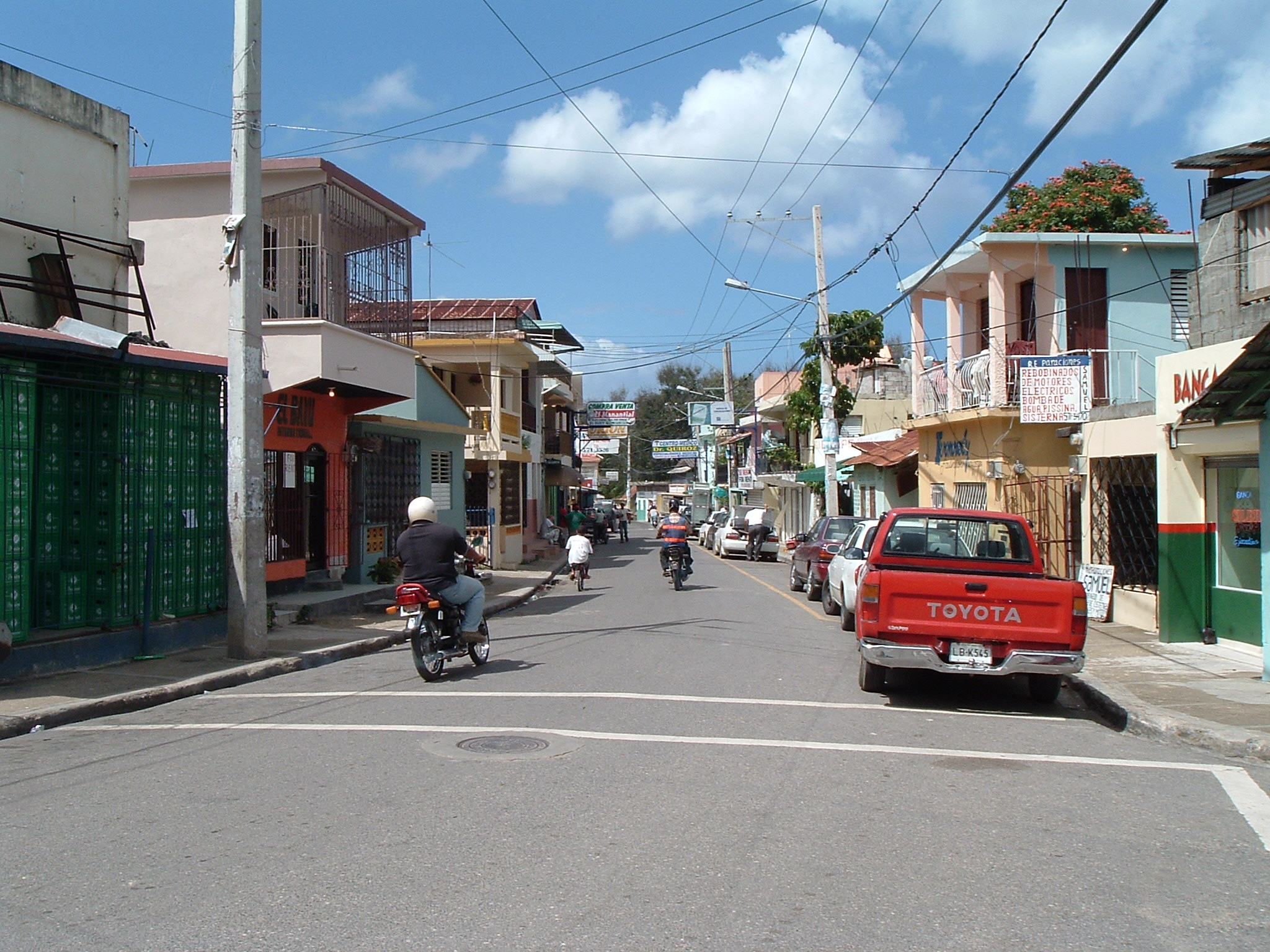
Los Charamicos
