= Francisco Henríquez y Carvajal =

Dominican educator and politician (1859–1935)

Mr. President Francisco Henríquez y Carvajal
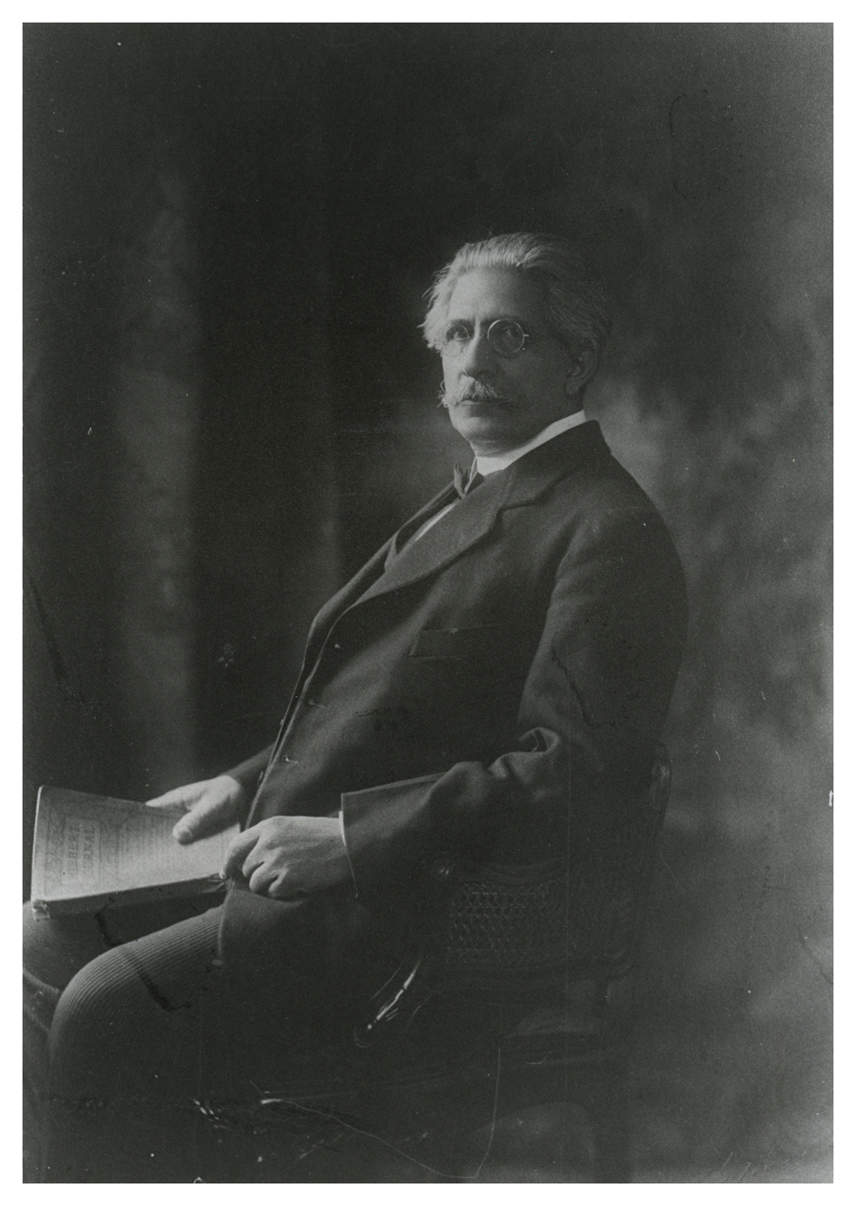

President of the Dominican Republic
- In office 31 July 1916 – 26 November 1916
- Preceded by: Council of Secretaries of State
- Succeeded by: Vacant

Personal details
- Born: January 14, 1859 Santo Domingo, Dominican Republic
- Died: February 6, 1935 (aged 76) Santiago de Cuba, Cuba
- Profession: Lawyer and politician

Francisco Hilario Henríquez y Carvajal (14 January 1859 – 6 February 1935) was a medical doctor, lawyer, writer, educator and politician from the Dominican Republic, who was President of the Dominican Republic from July 1916 to November 1916. His tenure as President ended with the US occupation of the Dominican Republic. He went into exile in Cuba.

== Life and career ==
Henríquez was born in Santo Domingo, to a Dominican mother and a Sephardic Jewish father who immigrated from Curaçao and was a descendant of Netherland Sephardic Jews. After studying extensively in his homeland, beginning in 1887, Henríquez moved to Paris for four years, earning a doctorate in Medicine the University of Paris. He returned to the Dominican Republic, where he practiced medicine and taught. He served as editor of the newspaper El Maestro, but left the country during the dictatorship of Ulises Heureaux. While away, he befriended Juan Isidro Jiménez and returned to the Dominican Republic in 1899 to serve as Minister of Foreign Affairs when Heureaux was assassinated and Jiménez was made president.

He was married Salomé Ureña, a poet, from 1880 until her death in 1898. He had 4 children, Pedro, Francisco, Max, and Camila. His second wife was Natividad Lauransón Amiama.

Following the fall of Jiménez in 1902, Henríquez established residence in Cuba and practiced medicine. He returned briefly to his country of birth following the interim government of Horacio Vásquez in 1903, but he left several months later. In 1907, President Ramón Cáceres sent him as a delegate to the Hague Convention. In 1911 Henríquez served as an emissary to Haiti following border disputes.

In 1916, Henríquez was on a diplomatic mission when he learned that the Dominican Republic had been occupied by the United States. The Council of Secretaries of State led by Horacio Vásquez elected Henríquez President. He served from 31 July to 26 November 1916. His successor was United States military governor Harry Shepard Knapp.

During the presidency of Rafael Trujillo, he served as envoy in France and Cuba from 1930 to 1935.

== Death and legacy ==
Henríquez died in Santiago de Cuba, Cuba in 1935 at the age of 76 and is buried in National Pantheon of the Dominican Republic in Santo Domingo.

Dominican educator and feminist Rosa Smester Marrero praised Henríquez in her writings while he was still alive. She had written to Henríquez in May 1920 to donate to the Nationalist cause during the American occupation, In her 1929 article Así es, she praised Henríquez's intellectual attributes, which lent him to being an "enlightened" feminist man.

== Selected publications ==
- "La hija del Hebreo" (1883, 'The daughter of the Hebrews')
- "Ramón Mella" (1891)
- "Informe sobre la seguridad Conferencia Internacional Americana" (1902,' Report on the American International Security Conference ')
- "Juvenilia" (1904)
- "Dolorosa" (1909,' Painful ')
- "Derecho Internacional Público y la Guerra" (1915)
- "Discurso pro-Pablo Duarte" (1915,' Speaking for Pablo Duarte ')
- "Páginas Selectas" (1918,'Selected Writings')
- "Cuba y Quisqueya" (1920, 'Cuba and Quisqueya ')
- "Rosa de la tarde" (1923, 'Rose of the Afternoon')
- "Guarocuya. Monólogo de Enriquillo El" (1924, 'Guarocuya. The monologue of Enriquillo')
- "Todo por Cuba" (1925, 'All of Cuba')
- "Nacionalismo" (1925, 'nationalism')
- "Del Amor y del Dolor" (1926, 'About love and about pain')
- "Páginas electas" (1926, 'Selected Writings')
- "Mi Álbum de Sonetos "(1927, 'My album of the sonnets')
- " Etica y Estética "(1929, 'ethics and aesthetic')
- " historicos Romances "(1937, 'Historical romances')
- Bani "(1939)
- " El poema de la historia. fragmento de un poema inconcluso "(1948, 'The poetry of history. fragment of an unfinished poem')
- " Cuentos "(1950, 'narratives')

Political offices
Preceded by Council of Secretaries of State	President of the Dominican Republic; 1916	Succeeded by United States occupation
