= Pedro Henríquez Ureña =

Dominican essayist, philosopher and literary critic (1884–1946)

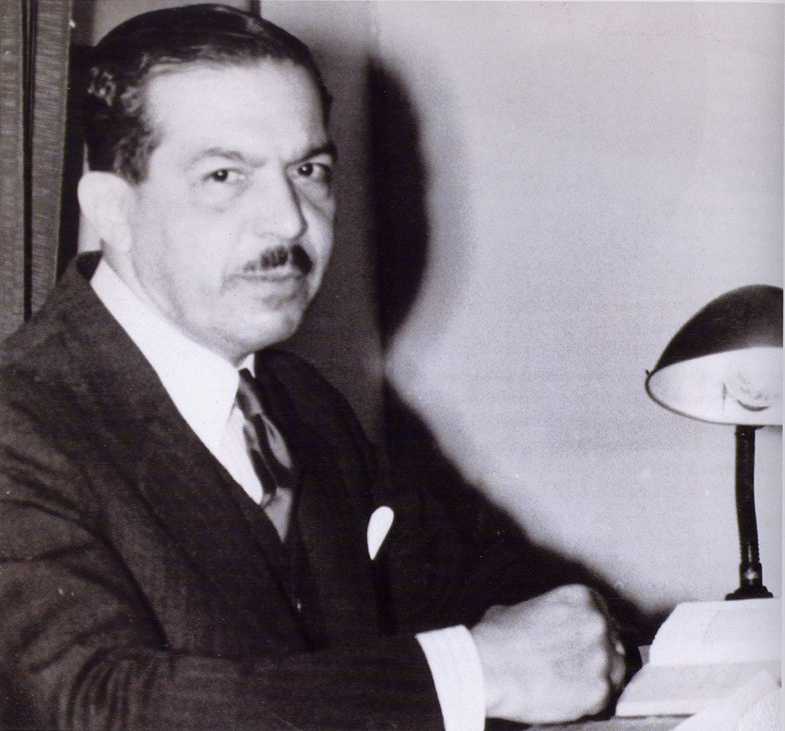
- Born: 29 June 1884; Santo Domingo, Dominican Republic
- Died: 11 May 1946 (aged 61); Buenos Aires, Argentina
- Occupation: Writer
- Parent(s): Francisco Henríquez y Carvajal (father); Salomé Ureña (mother)
- Relatives: Francisco Henríquez Ureña (brother) Max Henríquez Ureña (brother); Camila Henríquez Ureña (sister); Federico Henríquez y Carvajal (uncle) Luis Arístides Fiallo Cabral (cousin-in-law)

Pedro Henríquez Ureña (June 29, 1884 – May 11, 1946) was a Dominican essayist, philosopher, humanist, philologist and literary critic.

== Biography ==
=== Early works ===
Pedro Henríquez Ureña was born in Santo Domingo, the third of four siblings. Henríquez's father was Francisco Henríquez y Carvajal, a doctor and politician who was also an intellectual who maintained permanent contact with the most important representatives of the Hispanic Modernism movements from the early 20th century. Henríquez Carvajal would become president of the Republic for a brief period in 1916, before the American occupation. He descended from Jews who immigrated in the 19th century from Curaçao. His mother was the eminent poet and feminist Salomé Ureña. Both played a key role in Pedro's formation and education. His brother, Max, and sister, Camila, were also writers.

The young Pedro traveled to Mexico in 1906, where he lived until 1913. About these times he wrote in Horas de estudio. In these years he also wrote about philosophical criticism, specially the seriousness of the thought. Here he made his criticism of positivismo, being one of the first in the Hispanic America, in his articles "El positivismo de Comte" and "El positivismo independiente".

In 1914, in Cuba, he defined what according to him a good critic must be: a flexible scholar who knows how to adopt any point of view. But mainly he must know the spirit of the time and the country he is studying. The critic will always be tributary of the values of the society to which he belongs and thus must fight against them. He obtains his flexibility, sometimes without proposing to it.

=== Maturity ===
Between 1915 and 1916 Henríquez Ureña worked as a journalist in the United States, living in Washington and New York. In this last year he joined the faculty at the University of Minnesota where he taught until 1921. No doubt his travels influenced his work and his thinking. His humanism and Americanism – that is, his firm defense of Hispanic-American cultural values – made him write a final lecture for the Club of International Relations of the University of Minnesota about the "intervencionist policy of the United States in all the Caribbean", since his own nation had been invaded in 1916. In 1921 he traveled to Mexico where his americanismo would acquire a new vigor. Influenced by this atmosphere of enthusiasm towards the culture, he wrote his famous article "The utopia of America".

In 1923 he married Isabel Lombardo Toledano, sister of the famous union leader Vicente Lombardo Toledano. The two had a daughter, Natacha, the following year.

He went to La Plata in Argentina to continue with the study of literature to explain la expresión americana, to try to reach a language that would clarify the fundamental object of its investigation, the American continent. America is for Henríquez Ureña somewhat similar to a text that must be explained and nothing better for the interpretation of that text that the study of the totality of its language. The language is the system par excellence, since through it we registered and we organized our perceptions of the outer world. For that reason the differences of the American Spanish, not only took us to the knowledge to a phonetic study of the region but of the geographic area that each dialectal zone describes. Henríquez Ureña dedicated his research more directly towards linguistics when in 1930 he moved to Buenos Aires, to exert the position of Secretary in the Institute of Philology directed by Amado Alonso.

He was the first Spanish speaker invited to teach at the Charles Eliot Norton Lectures in 1940–1941. As results he wrote and published "Literary Currents in Hispanic America" in 1945.

For Henríquez Ureña, linguistics was a form to analyze in a scientific way the power of the American word, its wealth and its evolution through time. He sustained that language was one of the main instruments that would give rise to a social transformation in the America of the future.

He died in 1946, after suffering a heart attack during his daily commute from Buenos Aires to La Plata. He had been in the process of grading and correcting students' work.

== Major works ==
- Ensayos críticos (La Habana: Imprenta Esteban Fernández, 1905)
- Horas de estudio (París: Ollendorf, 1910)
- Nacimiento de Dionisios (Nueva York: Las Novedades, 1916)
- La versificación irregular en la poesía castellana (Madrid: Centro de Altos Estudios, 1920)
- En la orilla. Mi España. (Editorial México Moderno, 1922)
- La utopía de América (Buenos Aires: La Estudiantina, 1925)
- Seis ensayos en busca de nuestra expresión (Buenos Aires: Editorial Babel, 1928)
- La cultura y las letras coloniales en Santo Domingo (Buenos Aires:Facultad de Filología y Letras. Universidad de Buenos Aires. Instituto de Filología, 1936)
- Sobre el problema del andalucismo dialectal de América (Buenos Aires:Facultad de Filología y Letras. Universidad de Buenos Aires. Instituto de Filología, 1937)
- El español en Santo Domingo (Buenos Aires:Facultad de Filología y Letras. Universidad de Buenos Aires. Instituto de Filología, 1940)
- Plenitud de España (Buenos Aires:Editorial Losada, 1940)
- Literary currents in Hispanic America (Cambridge: Harvard University Press, 1945)
- Historia de la cultura en la América Hispana (México: Fondo de Cultura Económica, 1947)
- Las corrientes literarias en la América Hispánica. Traducción de Joaquín Díez-Canedo. (México: Fondo de Cultura Económica, 1949)
- Obras Completas, 14 tomos.Edición de Miguel D. Mena (Santo Domingo: Ministerio de Cultura de la República Dominiana, 2014–2015).

== Legacy ==
The Biblioteca Nacional Pedro Henríquez Ureña (in English: Pedro Henríquez Ureña National Library) is the national library of the Dominican Republic. It was inaugurated on February 28, 1971.
