= Camila Henríquez Ureña =

Dominican Republic writer (1894–1973)

Camila Henríquez Ureña (April 9, 1894, in Santo Domingo – September 12, 1973, in Santo Domingo) was a writer, essayist, educator and literary critic from the Dominican Republic who became a naturalized Cuban citizen. She descended from a family of writers, thinkers and educators; both her parents, Francisco Henríquez y Carvajal and Salomé Ureña, as well as her brothers Pedro and Max, were literary luminaries. Her essays have been published in Instrucción Pública, Ultra, Archipiélago (founded by her brother, Max), Casa de las Américas, La Gaceta de Cuba, Revista de la Biblioteca Nacional, Revista de la Universidad de La Habana, and Revista Lyceum. A feminist and a humanist, she lectured during much of her career, advocating intellectual study for women.

== Early life and family ==
Henríquez was born in Santo Domingo in 1894. She was the fourth child and only daughter of prominent intellectuals, the former Dominican President, Francisco Henríquez y Carvajal, and the poet and educator, Salomé Ureña. Her mother died in 1898 when Henríquez was four; her brother, Pedro, served as a mentor and instilled in his sister the legacy of their mother. She had two other brothers, Francisco and Max. Her father, Francisco Henríquez y Carvajal, was also a former President of the Dominican Republic.

In 1904, Henríquez moved with her father and stepmother, Natividad Lauranson, to Cuba. She attended the elementary school, Model School in Santiago de Cuba, and received her bachelor's degree from the Instituto de Segunda Enseñanza de La Habana. She received her Ph.D. in Philosophy and Letters from the University of Havana (1917) with the thesis, "Francisco de Rioja: su verdadera significación en la lírica española" ("Francisco de Rioja: his true significance in Spanish lyric poetry"). At the same university, she became a Doctor in Pedagogy; her dissertation, "The pedagogical ideas of Eugenio María de Hostos", centered on the Puerto Rican educator who was a mentor to Henríquez's mother. Henríquez studied and worked at the University of Minnesota from 1918 to 1921, obtaining a Masters of Arts in 1920. In 1922, she returned to Cuba, becoming a Cuban citizen four years later. In the mid 1920s, she was a professor at Academia Herbart, as well as the Escuela Normal de Maestros and at the Instituto de Matanzas.

== Career ==
Henríquez continued her studies from 1932 to 1934 at the Sorbonne. In 1930s Cuba, she participated in the events of various feminist organizations and cultural institutions. At Havana's Lyceum, she served as its president, and director of its magazine. She was the vice-president of the Unión Nacional de Mujeres (Women's National Union) (1936), and a collaborator at the Institución Hispana-Cubana de Cultura. Henríquez led the organization efforts of Cuba's Third National Congress of Women, held in 1939, and in the same year, was the opening speaker at Havana's First National Feminine Congress. In 1941, she lectured in Panama, Ecuador, Peru, Chile, Argentina, and Mexico, and served as a delegate to the Conference General Federation of University Women.

From 1942 through 1959, Henríquez lived in the United States, teaching at Vassar College, Middlebury College, and Kentucky's Centre College. During her 1948 sabbatical year, Henríquez traveled to Mexico where she was an editor at Fondo de Cultura Económica, while through the 1950s, she traveled to Spain, Italy, and France. Believing in the ideals of the Cuban Revolution, Henríquez returned to Cuba in 1959. She served as technical adviser to the Ministry of Education (1960-1962), and participated in the restructuring of the University of Havana, where she taught until her retirement in 1970. Before her death in 1973, she had affiliated with the Cuban Pen Club (vice-president), and the National Cuban Commission of UNESCO (member).

== Selected works ==
- "Ideas pedagógicas de Eugenio María de Hostos" (1932)
- "Curso de apreciación literaria" (1935)
- "La Poesía en Cuba en 1936" (anthology with Juan Ramón Jiménez and José María Chacón y Calvo (1936)
- "Feminismo" (1939)
- "La mujer y la cultura" (1949)
- "La carta como forma de expresión literaria femenina" (1951)
- "Cervantes" (1963)
- "El Renacimiento español" (1963)
- "Cantares de gesta" (1971)
- "William Shakespeare" (1972)
- "Dante Alighieri" (1974; posthumous publication)
