= Domingo Pilarte =

Domingo Pilarte may refer to:

- Domingo Pilarte (evangelist)
- Domingo Pilarte (fighter)
