= Domingo Pilarte (evangelist) =

Domingo Pilarte Sr.
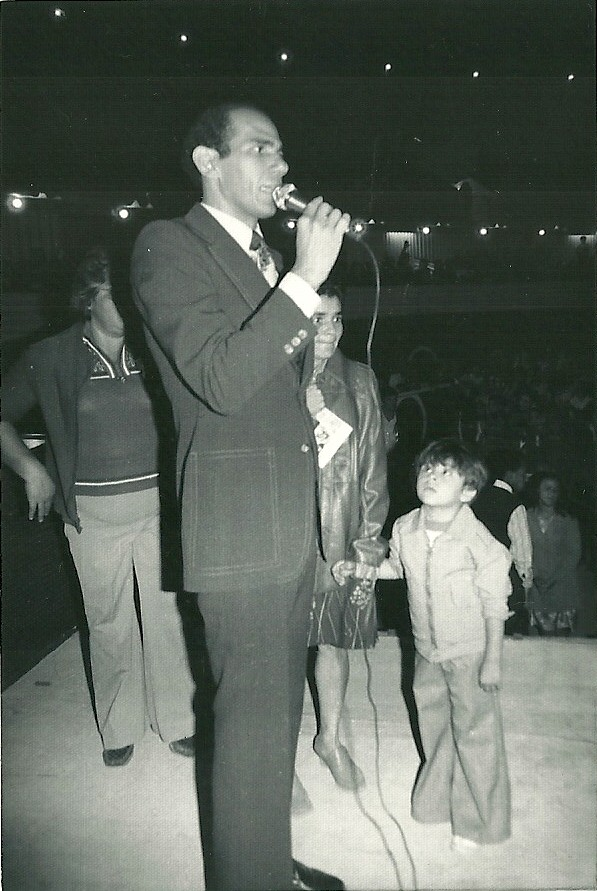
- Born: Domingo Damian Pilarte; February 23, 1941; Santiago, Dominican Republic
- Died: November 15, 2009 (aged 68)
- Occupation: Evangelist

Domingo Damian Pilarte (born February 23, 1941, in the Dominican Republic) was a Christian evangelist who held mass crusades during the 1960s–1980s. He traveled to more than 80 countries preaching the Gospel of Jesus Christ. A number of the claimed miracles that occurred during his crusades have been documented in books, magazines and newspapers. These miracles included healings of the crippled, blind, deaf, mute, and terminally ill.

== Early life ==
Domingo Pilarte was born in the Dominican Republic on February 23, 1941. He began preaching shortly after a near death experience where he lost his brother during a boating trip. He explains how God spoke to him and rescued him that day after nearly drowning, he documented this experience in his book titled My Calling.

== Ministry ==
Pilarte, at the age of 17, began preaching a simple message of salvation through Jesus Christ. It wasn't long before his ministry grew and he began preaching in stadiums around the world. He traveled to multiple countries including Venezuela, Panama, Costa Rica, Colombia, Japan, Trinidad and Tobago, and the US. There were a number of claims of miracles witnessed during his crusades.

== Family ==
Domingo Pilarte Sr. died on November 15, 2009. He is succeeded by his 5 children, Jimmy Pilarte, Josie Pilarte, Debbie Pilarte, and Ruth Pilarte. His ministry is succeeded by his son Domingo Pilarte Jr. He also has a grandson named Domingo Pilarte who is a professional MMA fighter (DomingoPilartemma.com).

== Crusade gallery ==
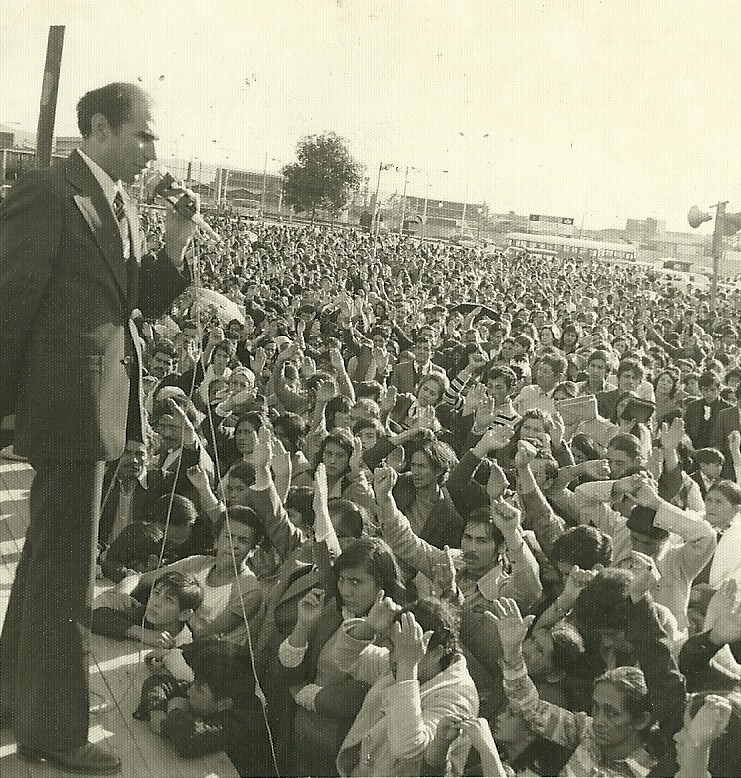

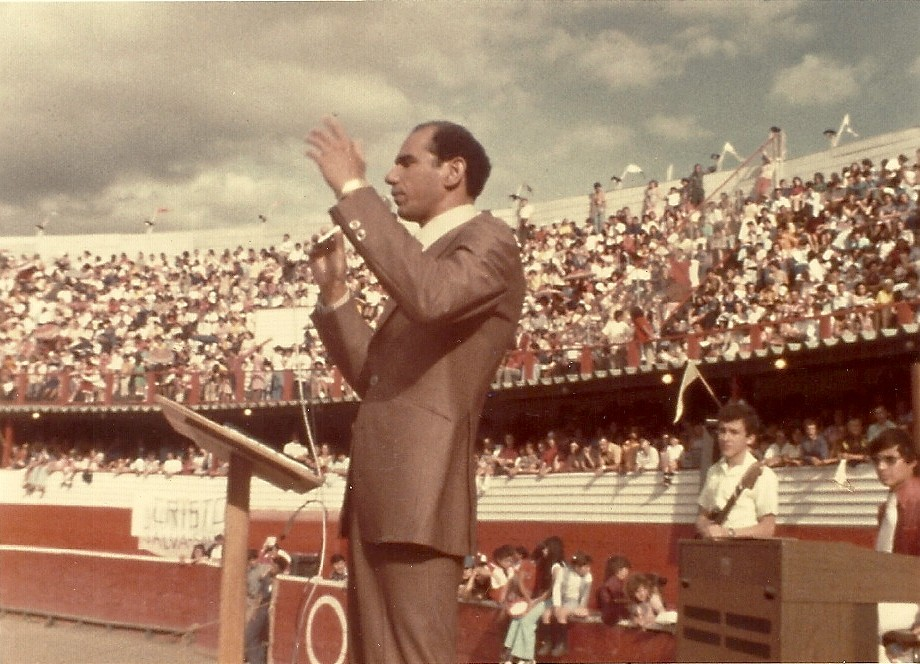

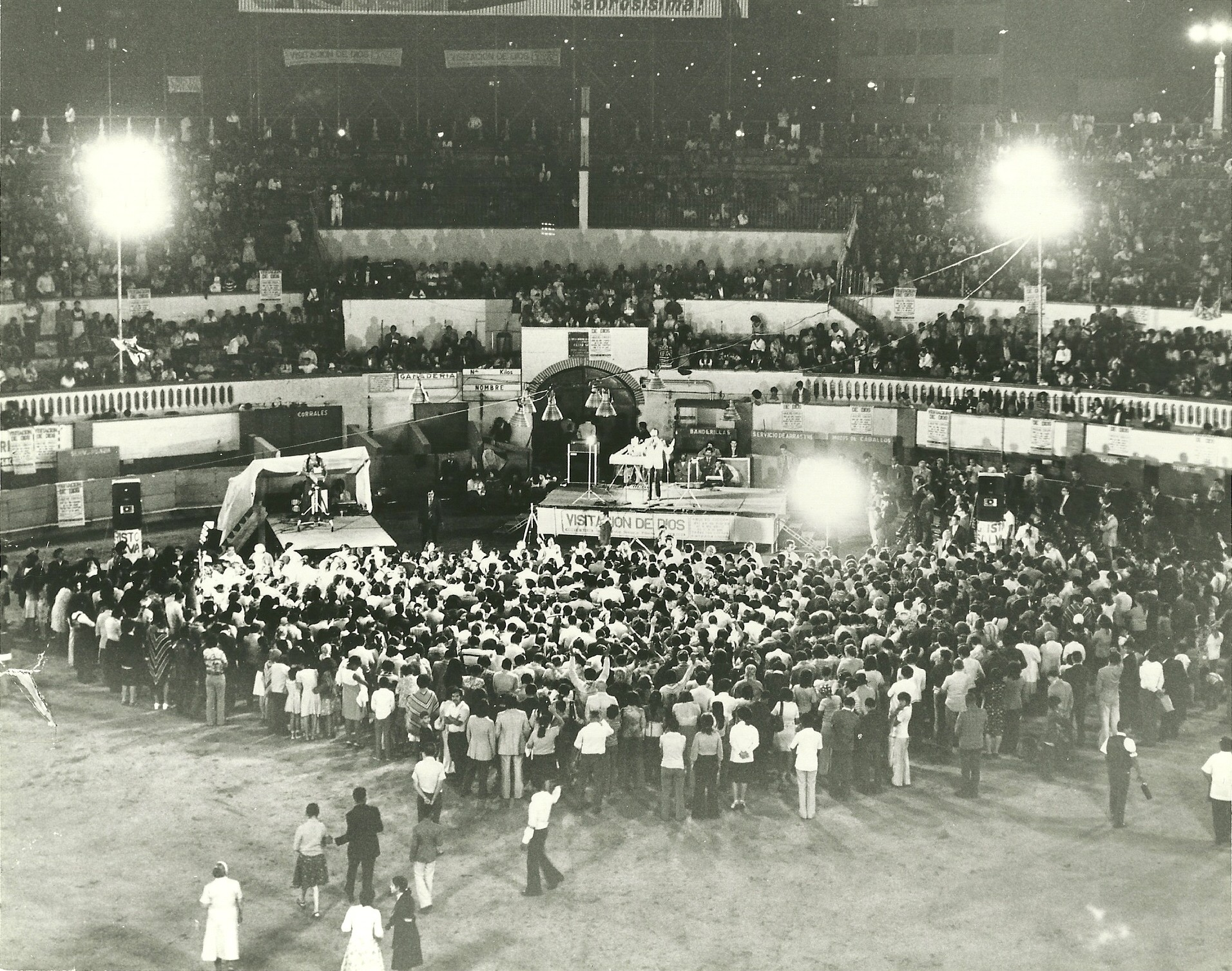
Crusade held in Caracas, Venezuela in El Nuevo Circo Stadium.

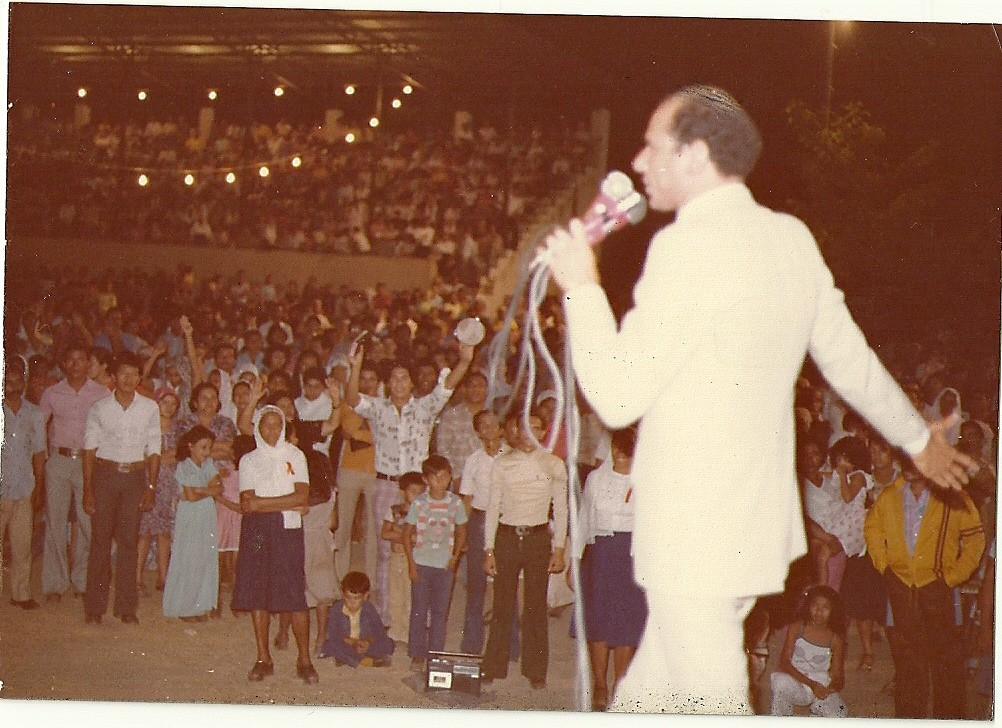

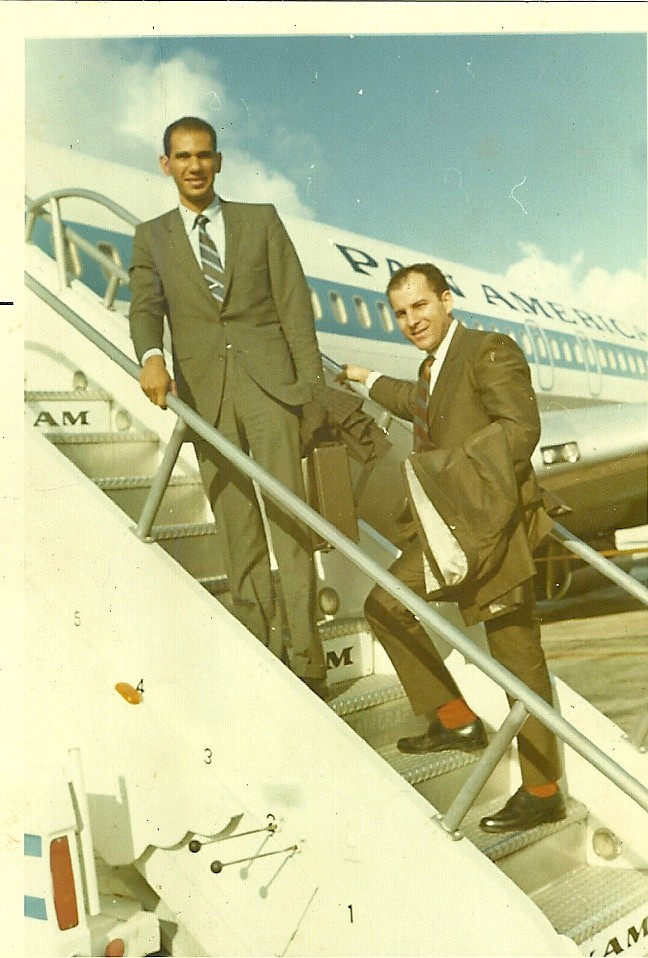

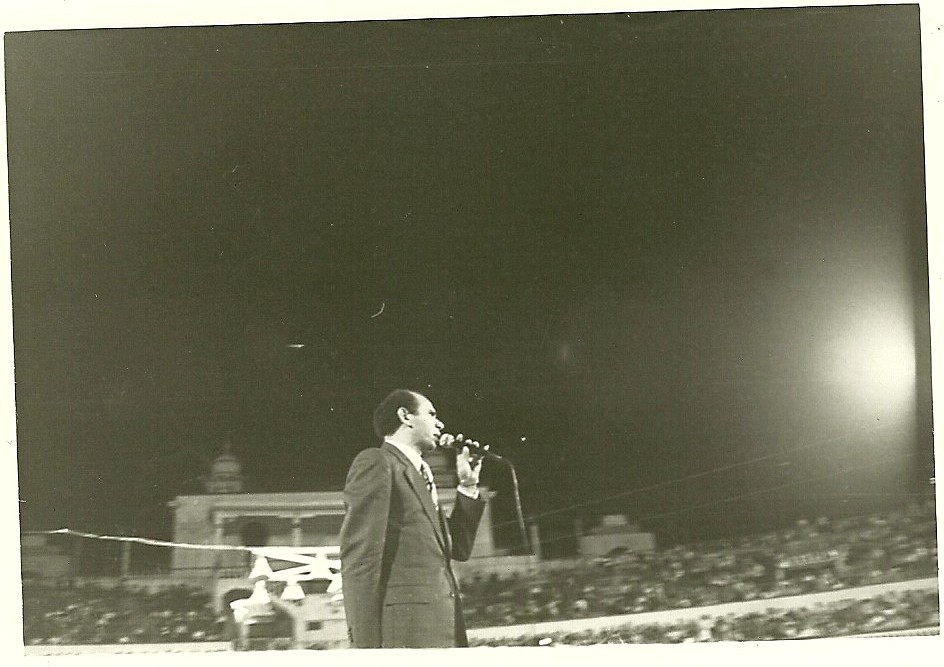

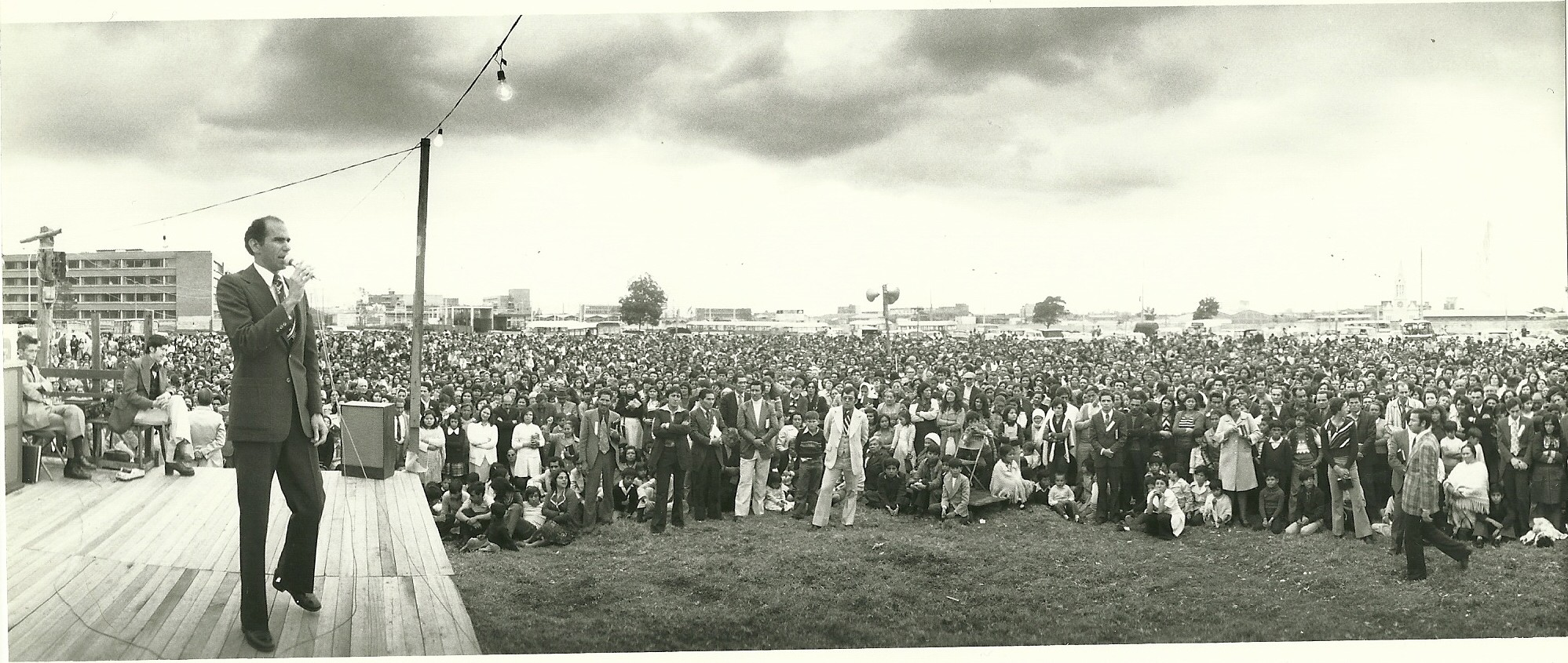

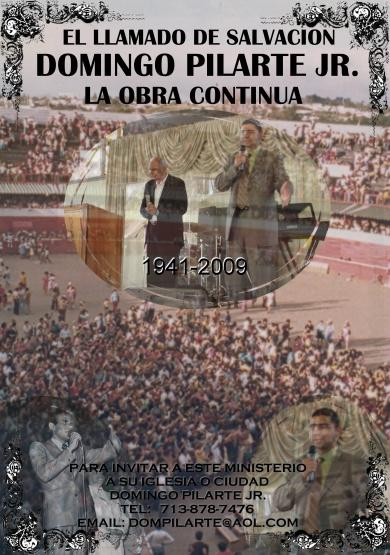

== General references ==
- Dr. Clifton L. Holland, director of PROLADES (23 June 2003). "Toward a Classification System of Religious Groups in the Americas" (PDF). Archived from the original (PDF) on 2016-03-03.
- West, C.H. (2008). Life Is a Great Adventure: Discovering Truth in the Journey of Life. Tate Publishing & Enterprises. p. 177. ISBN 9781604621648.*
